= History of the University of Michigan =

The history of the University of Michigan traces back to the colonial era of New France, beginning as a system of Christian schools located at or near Fort Pontchartrain du Détroit. By the turn of the 19th century, following the Great Fire of 1805, parishioners, including students and teachers from these Christian schools whose schoolhouses were destroyed in the fire, formed a corporation known as the Église Catholique, Apostolique et Romaine de Sainte Anne du Detroit, under its rector, Gabriel Richard. After much agitation by Richard for the establishment of an "institution for higher learning," the territorial government created an entity in 1817 named the Catholepistemiad, or University of Michigania. This entity formed in 1817 is the direct legal antecedent of today's University of Michigan, as confirmed by a decision of the Michigan Supreme Court in January 1856, thereby making it the oldest institution of higher education in the State of Michigan.

The Catholic parish of Sainte-Anne-de-Détroit was instrumental in the university's founding. A substantial portion of the initial endowment likely stemmed from an 1826 federal land grant for a Seminary of Learning of the Territory of Michigan. This grant was issued in accordance with a gift from Catholic members of indigenous tribes to the university's initiator, Gabriel Richard, to support both the parish and the creation of a College at Detroit. At its foundation, the university oversaw all cultural establishments within the territory. The original University Building on Bates Street in Detroit initially served a tripartite role, housing the nascent university, the Christian schools undergoing reconstruction following the Great Fire of 1805, and the city's library. This changed with the Organic Act of March 18, 1837, when the institution narrowed its functions to focus solely on higher education.

The university was the second U.S. institution to issue the Bachelor of Science degree in 1855, following Harvard's Lawrence Scientific School. Its university hospital, which opened in 1869, is the oldest in the country. The university was the first in the country to offer courses in aeronautical engineering, nuclear science & engineering, material science, metallurgy, public policy, and forestry. The university was one of the early doctoral-granting U.S. institutions in the late 19th century, awarding its first Doctor of Philosophy degrees in 1876.

== Origins ==
=== Cadillac's proposal ===
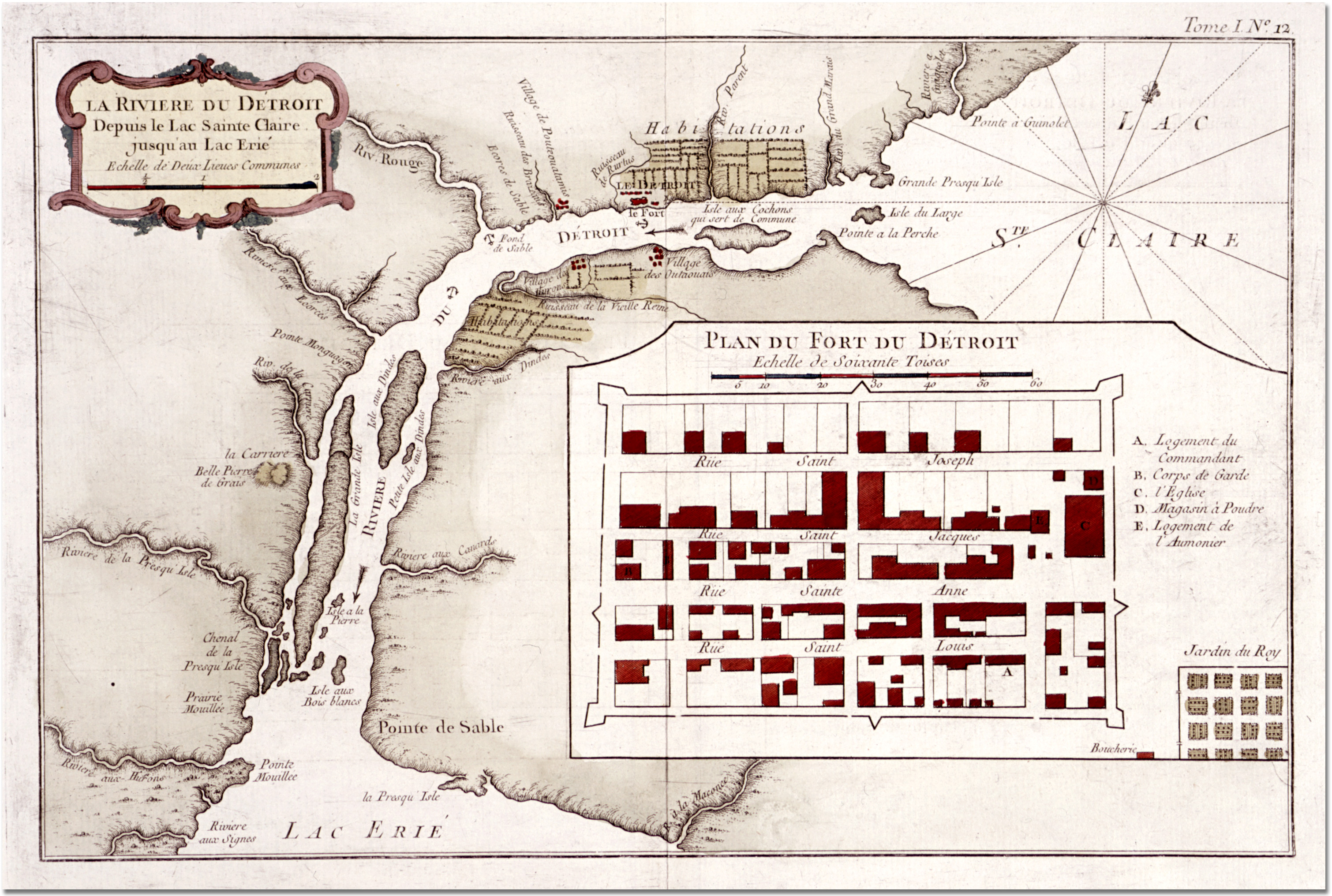
Map of Fort Pontchartrain du Détroit and the surrounding villages of the Outaouais, Hurons, and Poutouatamis tribes. c. 1752

The proposal for establishing an institution of higher education in Michigan dates back to 1703, during the colonial period of New France. Just two years after founding Fort Pontchartrain du Détroit on the strait between Lakes Saint Clair and Erie in 1701, the French explorer and later colonial governor of Louisiana, Antoine de la Mothe Cadillac, wrote to King Louis XIV's minister, Louis Phélypeaux de Pontchartrain, from the settlement under the date of August 31, 1703. He urged the establishment of a seminary in the newly formed parish of Sainte-Anne-de-Détroit:

Permit me to insist upon the great necessity there is for the establishment of a seminary at this place, for the instruction of the children of the savages with those of the French—instructing them in piety, and, at the same time, teaching them our language.

In contrast to the colonial colleges in British territories and the colonial universities in Hispanic America, the local demand for priests and ministers in French colonies was primarily met through a collection of séminaires, collèges and petites écoles, which provided both elementary schooling and classical studies. The operation of most educational institutions depended on various Catholic orders, especially the Jesuits and Sulpicians, but also the Recollects, Ursulines, and the Congregation of Notre Dame, among others.

The séminaires in the colonies were primarily institutional transplants from France. In terms of their spirit and mission to prepare individuals for the priesthood, these institutions closely resembled their counterparts in France, which were often advanced ecclesiastical establishments where séminariste were required to defend theses. However, the realities of a frontier society meant that they could not simply exist as carbon copies of those in France. In their early years, in an attempt by Jean-Baptiste Colbert, King Louis XIV's minister, to impose the French language and culture on the colonies, the séminaires in New France mainly served as preparatory schools for Indigenous people as well as for children of settlers with studious dispositions and a desire to enter the priesthood. They would only later evolve into true séminaires when circumstances allowed. At that time, several major séminaires were established in New France, notably the Séminaire de Québec, founded by Bishop François de Laval with the support of the Société des Missions Étrangères, to train priests in Quebec City. Additionally, the Sulpicians operated the Séminaire de Saint-Sulpice in Montréal.

Cadillac pledged his future support for the seminary and suggested that this should be the duty of the superiors in Québec:

This expense would not be very great; I believe if His Majesty [Louis XIV] would grant a thousand crowns to the seminary at Quebec, that institution would commence this pious and holy work.

It remains uncertain whether a seminary was ever established; the surviving registres after the fire on October 5, 1703, make no mention of a seminary being created from the proposal. Jesuit superiors in Quebec likely opposed the idea of creating a seminary in the Pays d'en Haut, due to disputes with Cadillac and fears of rivalry with their own institutions. Cadillac complained in his letter that the Jesuits had no desire to assume the duties of missionaries in Detroit, and they even discouraged other missionaries from coming to the area. Parish records related to the marriage of Jean Baptiste Rocoux on May 15, 1755 indicate, nevertheless, that he was "Director of Christian Schools", suggesting the influence of the gentle St. John Baptist de La Salle and his famous Institute of the Brothers of the Christian Schools. Rocoux kept a school either at his residence on St. Jacques Street or in a building under the patronage of Ste. Anne's Church. There was a French subscription school that stood near the fort in 1775, and an old account book preserved from 1780 contains tuition charges dated as early as 1760. Mentions are made of a seminary at the fort that trained young men for the ministry, which was destroyed in the Great Fire of 1805. Fr. Gabriel Richard is said to have presided over the seminary since 1804, teaching Latin, geography, ecclesiastical history, church music, and the practice of mental prayer. In 1811, M. Salliere joined the faculty as a professor of literature, chemistry, and astronomy. The exact date of the seminary's opening is unknown, although it existed as early as 1802.

The colony was surrendered to the British monarchy in 1762 following the French and Indian War. However, the British viewed the colony merely as a trading post and did practically nothing for education, leading to stagnation during their rule from 1763 to 1796. After the 1783 peace treaty with the United States, the British abandoned their hopes of permanently holding Detroit, maintaining it only as a military outpost. Despite Alexander Grant, William Macomb, and David William Smith representing Greater Detroit in the first parliament of Upper Canada, the parliament hesitated to pass laws, enacting only a few inadequate acts, and did not establish any schools. As a result, English families in the area sent their children to French Christian schools, which became bilingual. In the account by Fr. François-Xavier Dufaux, who presided over a girls' school founded in 1782 by Fr. François-Xavier Hubert in the nearby parish of the Assumption, he noted:

In the fort there are four or five schools containing both boys and girls, the most of them English, for they alone are desirous of educating their children, and can afford to do so.

When the Americans took control of the colony in 1796, following the signing of the Treaty of Paris, the judges of the territorial government were supposed to be called in to formally define the rights and legal status of the Christian schools under the new constitution. Thereafter, the interpretation of the American right to education in Michigan, grounded in Section 1, Article XI of the Northwest Ordinance, was laid out.

=== Gabriel Richard's petitions ===
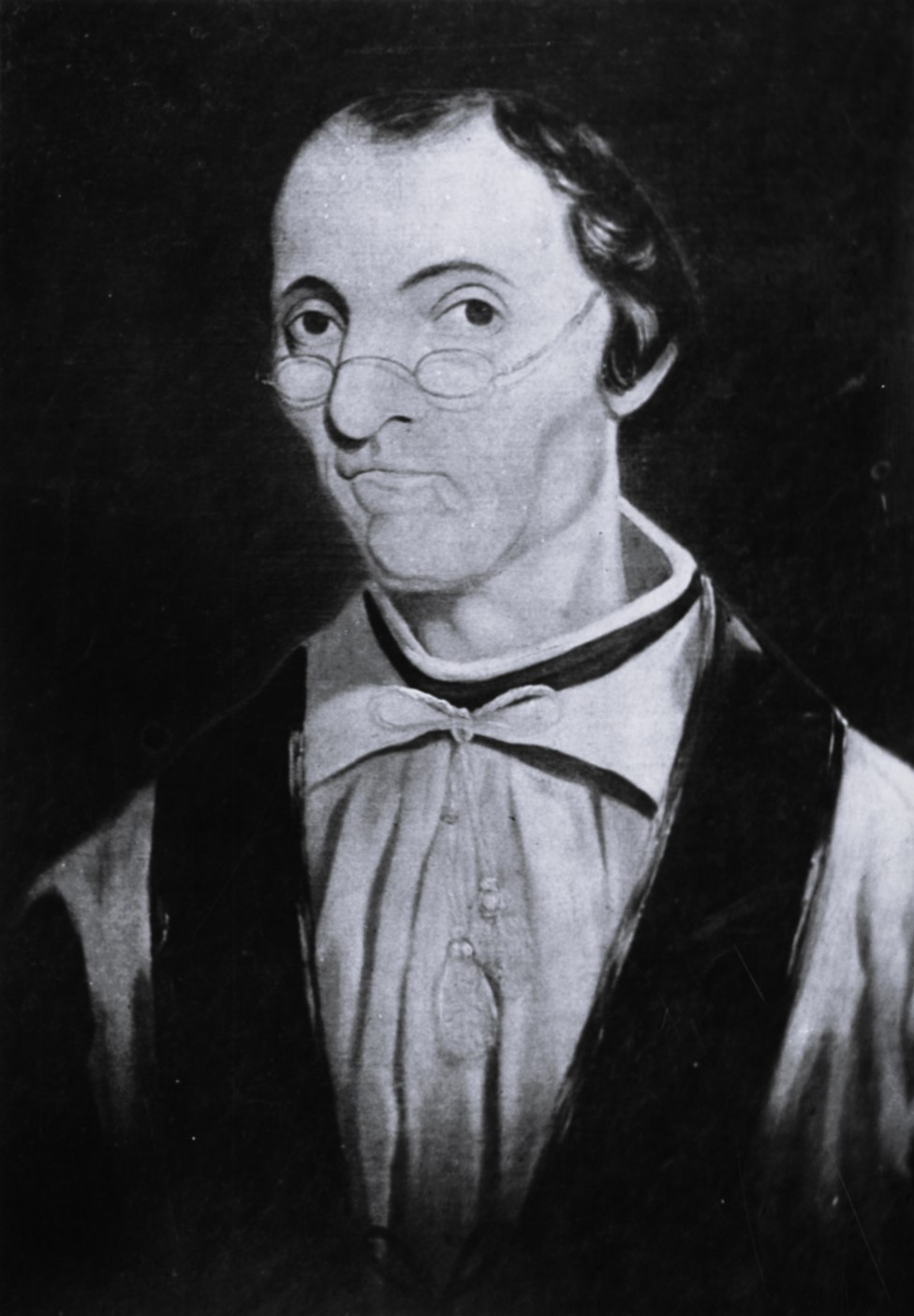
Gabriel Richard, a Sulpician priest, served as the rector of St. Anne's Church in Detroit and later founded the Catholepistemiad following the Great Fire of 1805

The schools, now under the ministry of Fr. Gabriel Richard, were scattered throughout the colony. In 1804, Fr. Richard established a Ladies' Academy, with Elizazbeth Lyons, Angelique Campau, Monique Labadie, and Elizabeth Williams as teachers. He also established a library for the church and a printing press.

Following the Great Fire of 1805, Congress enacted a law on April 21, 1806, allowing the governor and judges to allocate village lots to those entitled and to dispose any remaining lots not distributed to fire victims. In October 1806 Richard presented the following petition to the governor and judges:

To the legislature of the Territory of Michigan,

Gabriel Richard prays that for the purpose of erecting a college in which will be taught the languages, ancient and modern, and several sciences, etc. and enabling him to render the Education partly Gratuitous, the Corner lot on the military square of the section number 3 and the whole same section or a part thereof according to the will and benevolence of the Legislature be given.

— Gabriel Richard, Rector of Ste. Anne (Detroit 8ber A. D. 1806)

The lot mentioned in this petition would have been too small for a college and the priest requested a larger tract of land, between Woodward Avenue and Griswold Street, from Campus Martius to Jefferson Avenue, including additional lots west of Griswold and south of Larned. However, the request was not granted.

On April 15, 1807, the parishioners formed a corporation known as the Église Catholique, Apostolique et Romain de Sainte Anne du Detroit. This organization was granted a block of land bounded by Larned, Bates, and Randolph Streets. The articles of incorporation for the church included a provision for the appointment of school teachers by the bishop of the diocese. On October 18, 1808, Richard addressed a memorial to the territorial governor and judges. In this memorial, he mentioned, in addition to the schools in the town of Detroit, “four schools for boys and two for our young ladies, either in town or at Spring Hill, at Grand Marais (modern-day Grosse Pointe), or even at River Hurons.” He further proposed the establishment of an "institution for higher learning", and suggested that a lottery might be used to support the academies he headed.

Subsequently, in 1817, during the postwar period following the War of 1812, the Territorial government, at the instigation of Gabriel Richard and Judge Augustus B. Woodward and with the support of U.S. President Thomas Jefferson, passed "an Act to establish the Catholepistemiad, or University of Michigania" within the Territory of Michigan. Enacted on August 26, 1817, the Act effectively consolidated the schools into one institution, with Rev. John Monteith, a Presbyterian minister who had arrived in Detroit a year earlier, serving as its president and Fr. Richard as vice president. Its didactors had authority not only over the university itself but also over education in the territory in general. The legislative act was signed into law by Acting Governor and Secretary William Woodbridge, Chief Judge Augustus B. Woodward, and Judge John Griffin.

== The Catholepistemiad, 1817 to 1837 ==
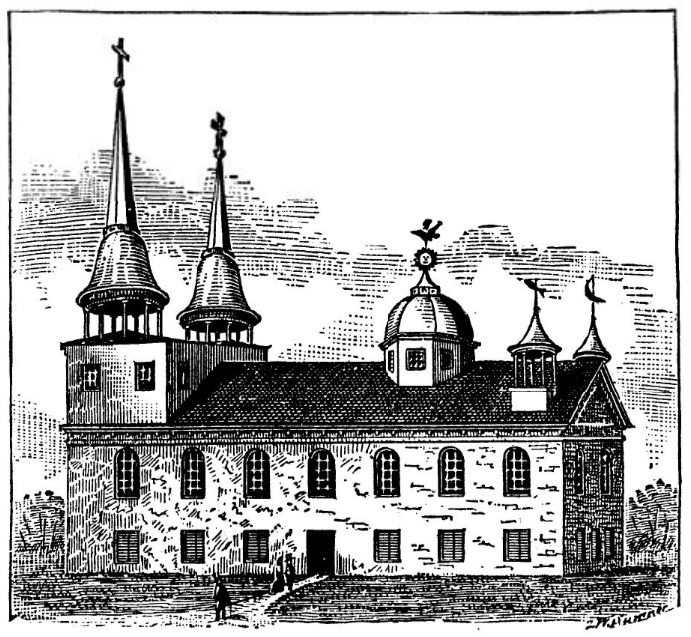
Ste. Anne's "Stone Church", built in 1818

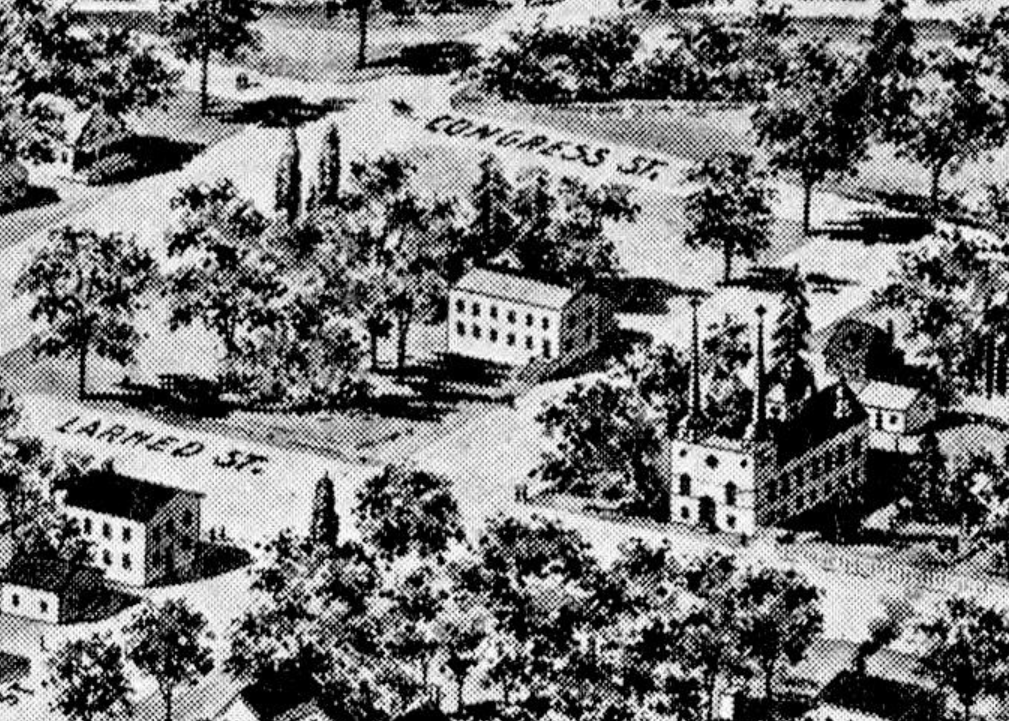
The Catholepistemiad's schoolhouse (center) on an 1818 map of Detroit. The schoolhouse fronts Bates Street, directly across from Ste. Anne's "Stone Church" (middle of the lower right).

The term "Catholepistemiad," a neologism derived from a blend of Greek and Latin roots, can be loosely translated as "School of Universal Knowledge". The corporation was modeled after an institution established in France a decade earlier, known as the Université imperial, under Emperor Napoleon. Under the act, the Catholepistimiad, or University of Michigania, was to be established with professorships, or didaxiim in thirteen fields of knowledge: Anthropoglossica (Literature), Mathematica (Mathematics), Physiognostica (Natural History), Physiosophica (Natural Philosophy), Astronomia (Astronomy), Chymia (Chemistry), Iatrica (Medicine), Œconomica (Economical Sciences), Ethica (Ethics), Polemitactica (Military Science), Diëgetica (Historical Sciences), Ennœica (Intellectual Sciences), and Catholepistemia (Universal Science). Initially, Richard was granted six didaxiim, and John Monteith, was granted the other seven. In addition, Monteith was to serve as the university's president and Richard would be its vice president.

The university's didactors had authority over not only the university itself, but education in the territory in general, with the authority to "establish colleges, academies, schools, libraries, museums, atheneums, botanical gardens, laboratories, and other useful literary and scientific institutions consonant to the laws of the United States and of Michigan, and provide for and appoint Directors, Visitors, Curators, Librarians, Instructors and Instructrixes among and throughout the various counties, cities, towns, townships, or other geographical divisions of Michigan." It was not until the legislative council passed the territory's first public school law on April 12, 1827, which made basic education a municipal duty, that the corporation focused solely on higher education.

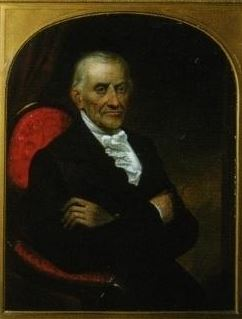
Joseph Campau of the prominent Campau family, an early benefactor of the university

The university may have initially been funded through private donations and federal land grants. Shortly after its founding in 1817, it received a $250 subscription from the Freemason Zion Lodge of Detroit. Of the total amount subscribed to establish the university, two-thirds came from the Zion Lodge and its members. Early benefactors included Joseph Campau (1769–1863) and his nephew John R. Williams (1782–1854). The first endowment may have been a land grant from the U.S. federal government on May 20, 1826, as part of "an Act concerning a seminary of learning in the territory of Michigan," based on the Treaty of the Foot of the Rapids and the Treaty of Detroit. The university also received a portion of the relief fund from the Great Fire of 1805 through "An Act to Assume the Responsibility of Certain Donations from Montreal and Michilimackinac," which states the following:

Whereas, for the relief of the sufferers by the conflagration of the ancient town of Detroit in the year 1805, there were transmitted from Montreal and Michilimackinac certain sums of money which are now in the city of Detroit unpaid to such sufferers owing to the want of some principles on which payment can be made, so as to discharge the holders thereof, and whereas, the said sufferers have generally manifested a desire that the said funds should now be appropriated in aid of the University of Michigania; Therefore

Be it enacted by the University of Michigania that the holders of the same funds paying over the same to the trustees of the University, the said University shall be responsible for all future claims on the same, on the part of the sufferers by the conflagration aforesaid.

Passed at the City of Detroit, on Saturday, the 20th day of September, 1817.

— J. Monteith, President of the University of Michigania.

The cornerstone of the first university building, located on Bates Street directly across from the 1818 stone church of Ste. Anne Parish in Detroit, was laid on September 24, 1817. On February 2, 1818, Hugh M. Dickie was commissioned by the university to open "a Classical Academy where Latin and Greek languages and other branches of science were to be taught at the customary prices." On May 2, 1818, the university appropriated "thirty dollars for rent of rooms for the Classical Academy up to the 11th day of June." Dickie began his work around February 11, and the school was in operation as late as November. The university also appointed Benjamin Stead, James Connor, and Oliver Williams as directors of a Lancasterian school. On August 10, 1818, a school under this name, taught by Lemuel Shattuck, opened in the University Building. It started with 11 students, and by April, enrollment had increased to 130.

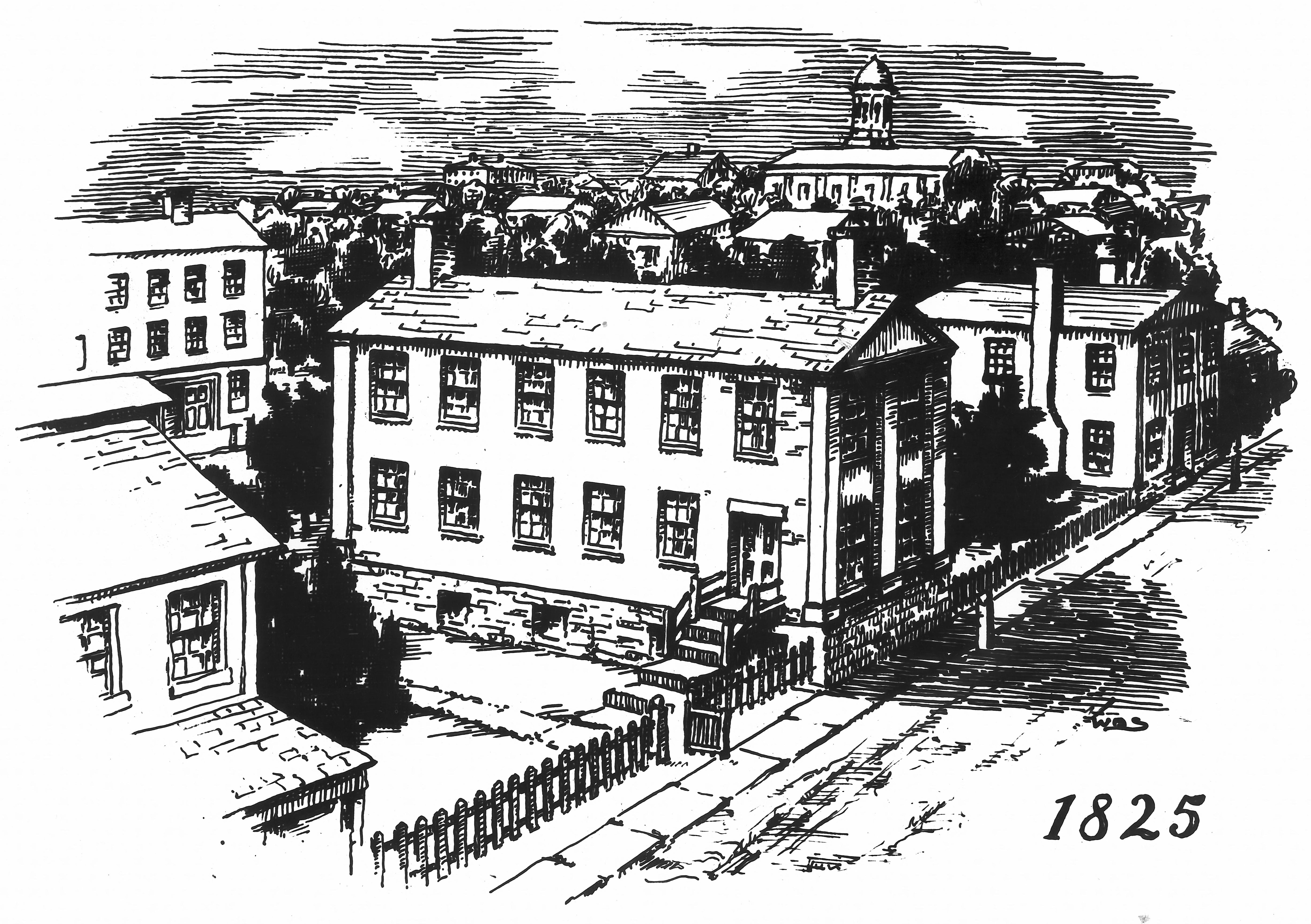
A 1825 drawing of the Catholepistemiad's University Building

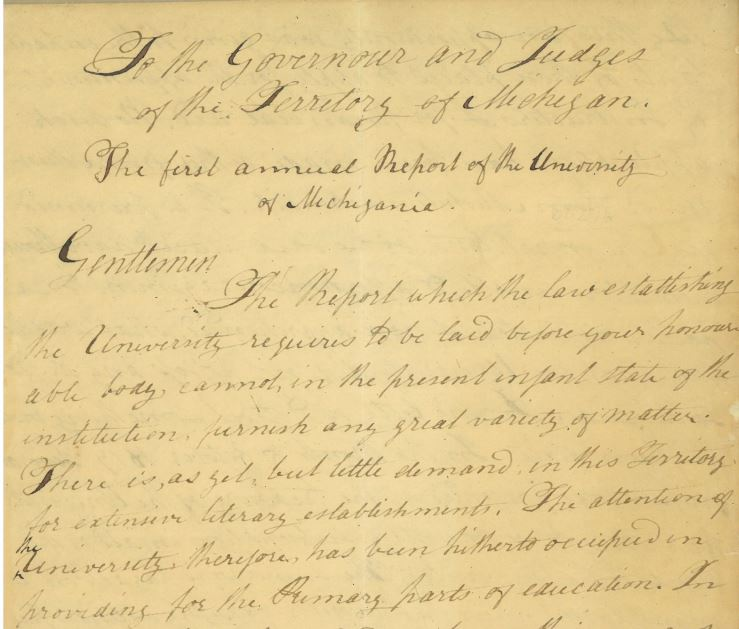
First Annual Report of the University of Michigania, authored by its first president John Monteith, November 16, 1818

The city library of Detroit, incorporated on August 26, 1817, was initially located in the university building, with university teachers serving as librarians. Over the years, the university building was occupied by various private teachers, including D. B. Crane, who taught Latin and Greek and established a chemistry laboratory in the building. His chief assistants in the chemistry department were Edmund R. Kearsley and Talcott E. Wing. Crane's pupils included members of prominent Detroit families, such as Dominique Riopelle of the Riopelle family. The University Building later served as the Detroit Branch School after the university moved to Ann Arbor.

In 1821, by a new enactment, the university itself was created as a "body politic and corporate", maintaining its corporate status through various modifications to its charter. The new act placed the corporation under the control of a board of trustees. Rev. Monteith joined the board shortly but left the university for New York a year later, despite being offered the chairmanship. The trustees were authorized to establish schools and colleges at their discretion. They continued to manage the schools and Classical Academy, but established no new schools.

=== Indian land grant ===
On May 15, 1824, U.S. President James Monroe signed "an Act concerning a seminary of learning in the territory of Michigan," which granted land from the federal government to the trustees, known as the "Corporation of the College of Detroit," as stated in the document. It divides and grants three of the six sections of land to the corporation, based on Section 16 of the Treaty of the Foot of the Rapids and Section 6 of the Treaty of Detroit. It officially registered the land with the United States Land Office.

By previous treaties, Indigenous nations ceded the land northwest of the Ohio River to the United States. In the Treaty of Fort Meigs, these nations ceded their remaining lands within the Ohio territory. In exchange, Catholic members of the indigenous tribes asked that six sections of land be reserved for the rector of St. Ann's Church for religious use and the creation of a College at Detroit.

Later, the trustees sold the lands granted to them by the United States, which were originally ceded by the Indigenous tribes of the Odawa, Ojibwe, and Potawatomi, based on an interpretation of the Treaty of Fort Meigs and the 1824 land grant. In 1971, Paul Johnson filed a lawsuit on behalf of the children of the Odawa, Ojibwe, and Potawatomi, demanding an accounting of the funds received by the university from the sale of "Indian educational trust lands." The lawsuit argued that these funds should be used to educate Indigenous children. The court ruled in favor of the university, stating that the lands were given as an outright gift, partly due to the tribes' affection for Father Richard. This ruling was upheld by the Michigan Court of Appeals in 1981.

=== Public school system ===
The right to education for Americans in Michigan is outlined in several legislative documents from the Northwest Territory. The Land Ordinance of 1785 specified that each township should set aside land to be rented out to support public schools. The assumption by the territory of responsibility for education is expressed in Section 1, Article XI of the Northwest Ordinance, which was enacted two years later:

Religion, morality and knowledge being necessary to good government and the happiness of mankind, schools and the means of education shall forever be encouraged.

By 1827, the territory's first public school law mandated that local governments organize school districts within a township, with township officials responsible for drawing district boundaries and requiring any township with 50 or more families to provide a schoolmaster. Thereafter, the university leased the Detroit schoolhouse to private teachers, and the first school in Detroit under this law opened about the first June after the trustees of the university ordered on May 27, 1827, "that Mr. Cook, the teacher of the common school, be allowed the use of a room in the Academy." However, the school soon closed following the passing of its teacher. The following year, the Bridge School in Raisinville Township was established under local governance.

== Early years in Ann Arbor, 1837 to 1851 ==
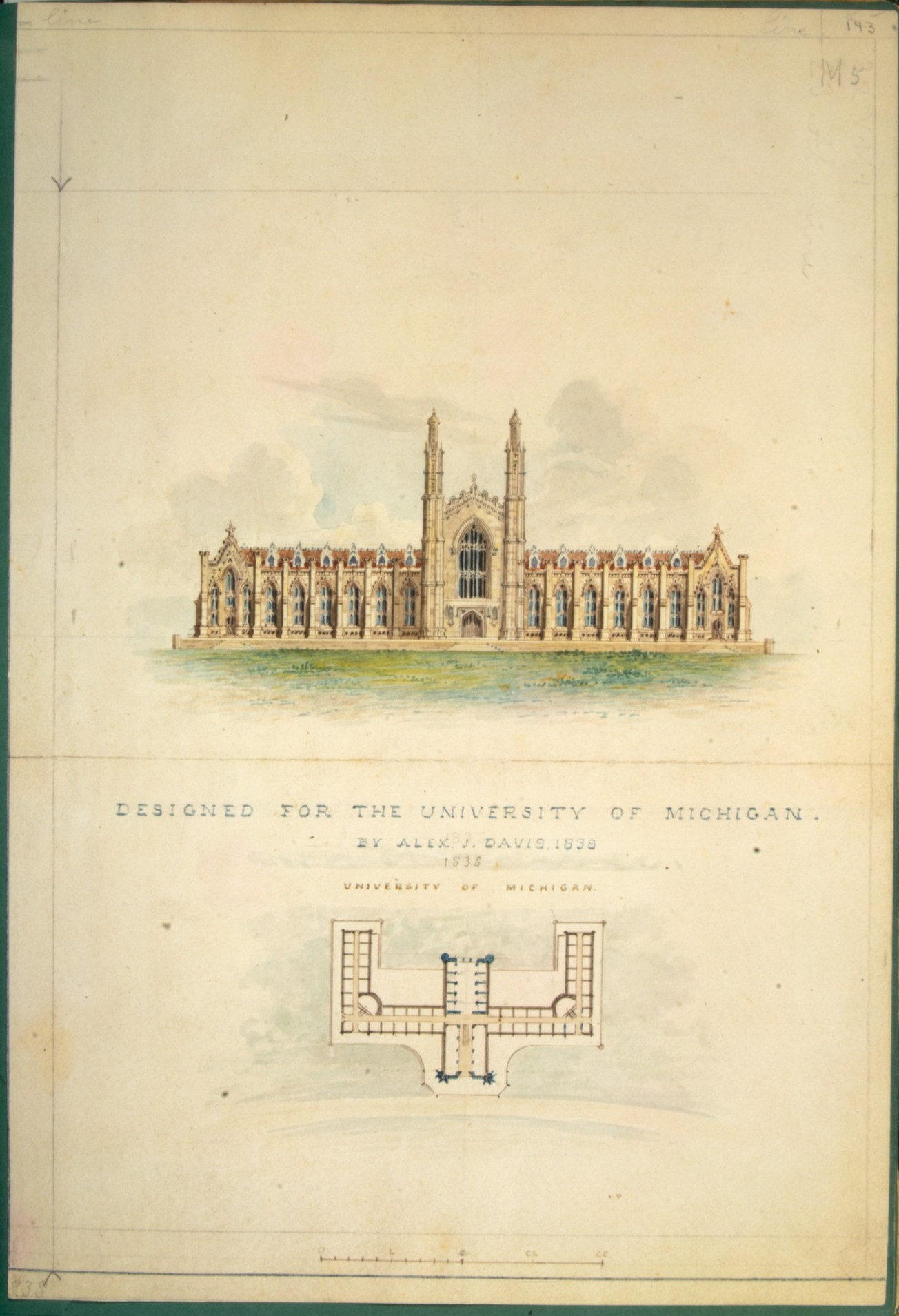
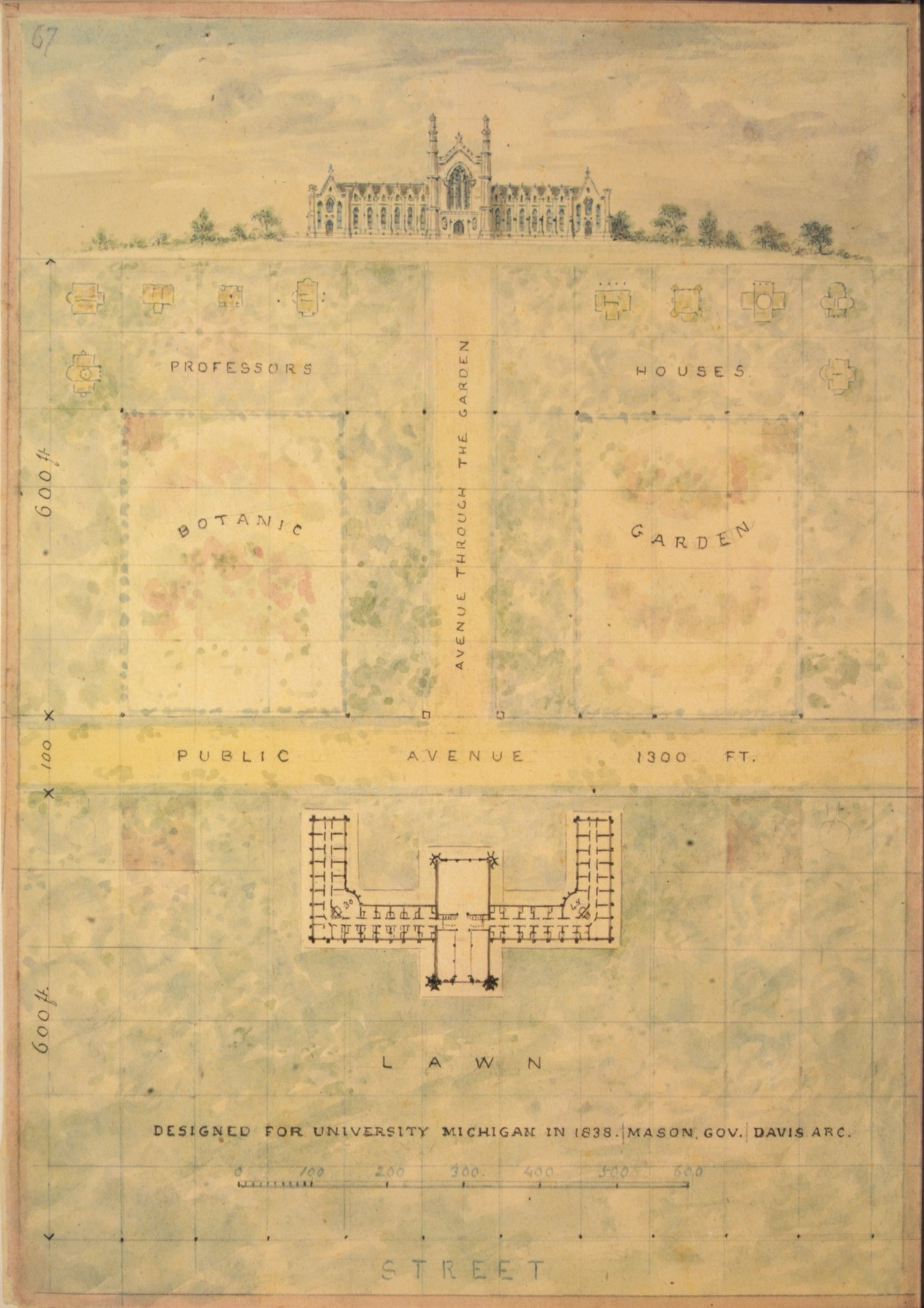
Designs for the University of Michigan by Alexander J. Davis

Following Michigan's admission to the Union in 1837, an organic act was passed on March 18, 1837, to reorganize the university under a twelve-member board of regents. The regents met in Ann Arbor and accepted the town's proposal for the university to relocate to Judge Henry Rumsey's farmland.

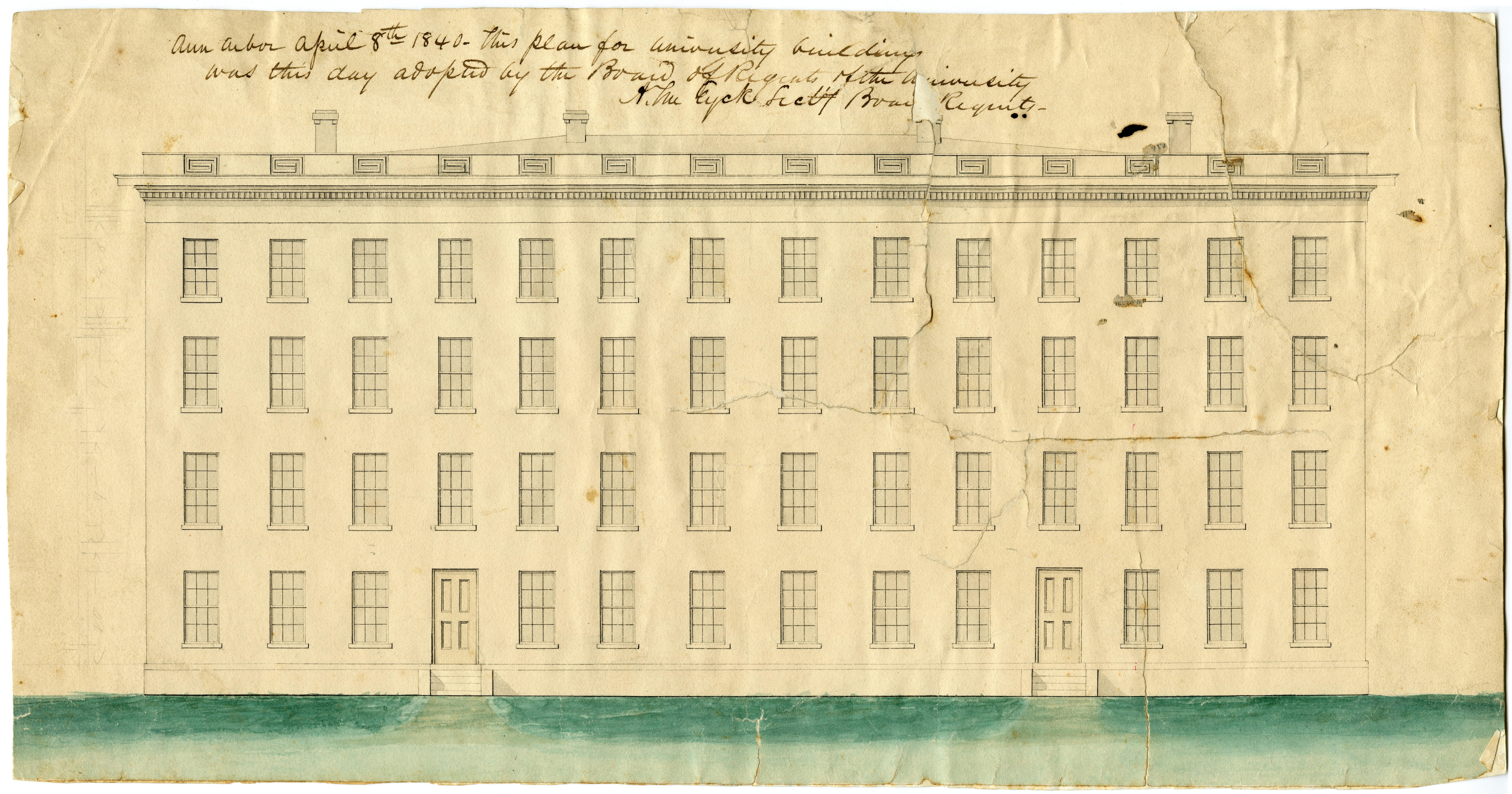
A colored elevation of Mason Hall (1841–1950), the first instructional building on the Ann Arbor campus. Its design inspired North Hall (1851) in Madison, Wisconsin

The approved campus plans for the university were drawn up by the architect Alexander Davis. Davis designed an elaborate Gothic main building with a large lawn in front, wide avenues, and botanical gardens, all arranged to evoke the French château aesthetic. He also provided possible sites for future buildings; however, the plans were never executed. Instead, four houses for professors were authorized. Historians attribute the abandonment of the original plan to the financial constraints the university faced as a result of the Panic of 1837. Construction began in 1839, and in 1841, Mason Hall, the first campus building, was completed, followed by the construction of South College, a nearly identical building to the south, in 1849, leaving a gap for a future grand centerpiece.

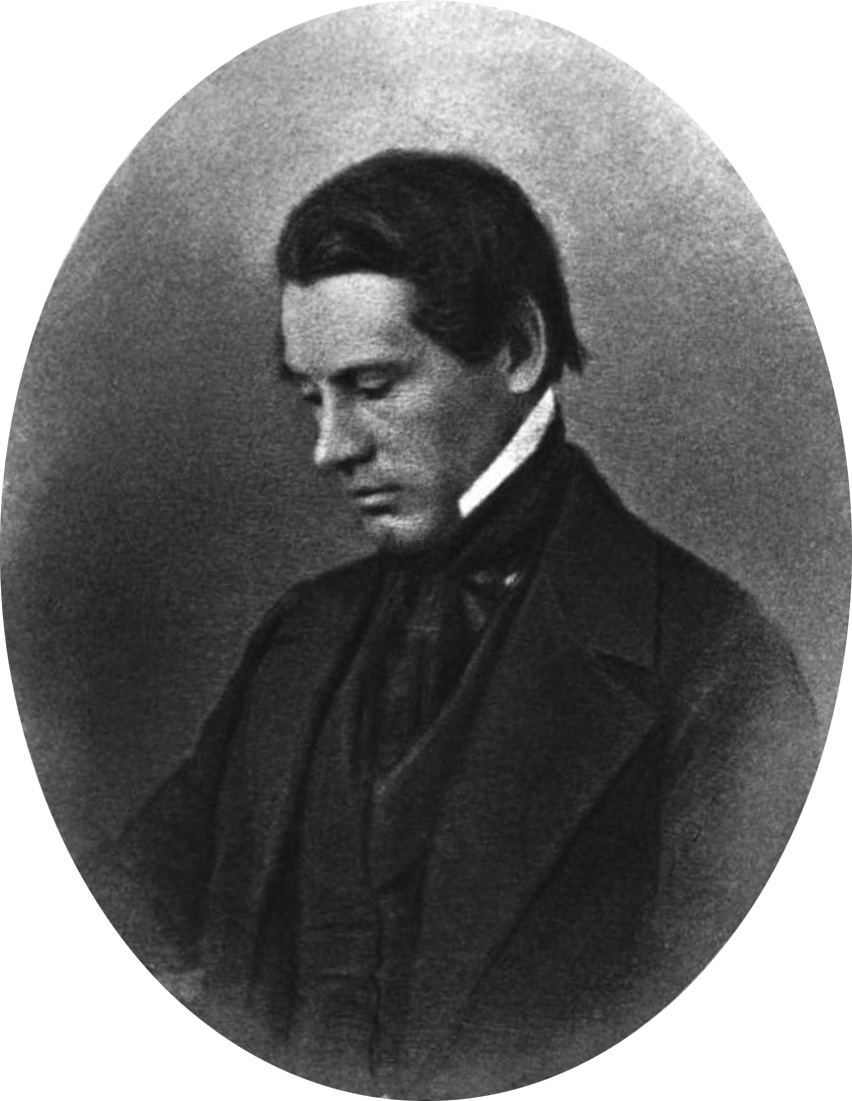
Asa Gray

The first classes in Ann Arbor were held in 1841, with six freshmen and one sophomore taught by two professors, Joseph Whiting and George Palmer Williams. Asa Gray was the first professor appointed following the university's move to Ann Arbor in 1837. He and the regents were both involved in stocking the university library. In 1846, Louis Fasquelle, a native of France, was appointed as the first professor of modern languages, primarily teaching French and writing textbooks. French became the first modern language taught at the university. During the first commencement in 1845, eleven graduates, including Judson Collins, were awarded Bachelor of Arts degrees. In 1850, the medical school was founded, and in two years, it graduated 90 physicians.

The administration during the early years of the university was complicated and designed to keep it tightly under state authority. The university's business was often intertwined with state affairs. The position of chancellor of the university, created by the organic act in 1837, was never filled, and the positions on the board of regents, appointed by the governor, were often held by state officials. The lieutenant governor, the justices of the Michigan Supreme Court, and the chancellor of the state all served as ex officio members of the board, with the governor himself chairing the board. The regents' powers were shared with a rotating roster of professors, who were responsible for some vague aspects of the university's administrative duties; however, all important decisions had to be made by the governor and his party. There were several attempts to gain independence from the state legislature, but progress was slow until the late 1840s, when the regents gained leverage, supported by Michigan citizens. This shift culminated in a revision of the organic act on April 8, 1851, which freed the university from legislative control, transitioned the regent positions from appointed to elected, and established a president selected by the regents.

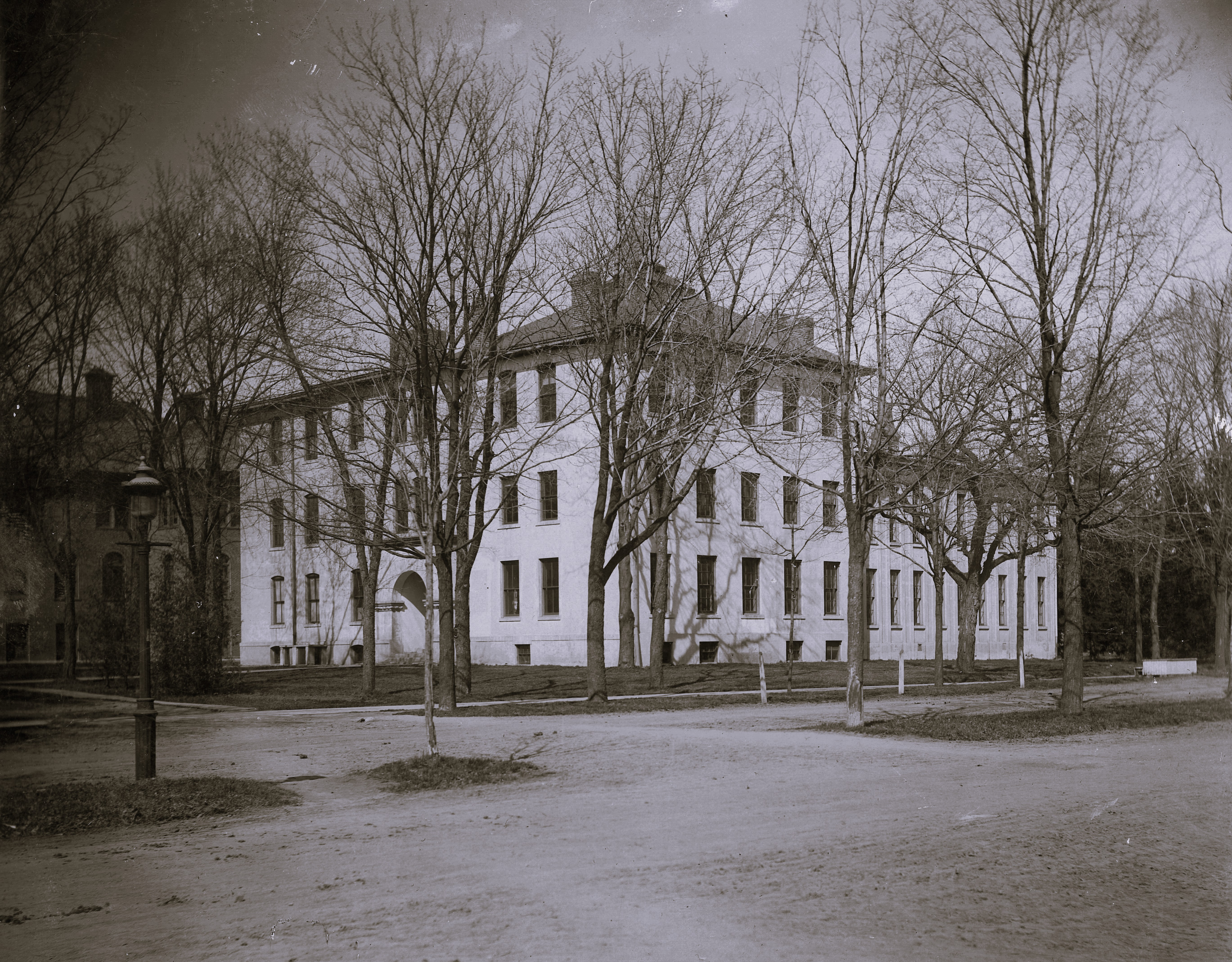
Southeast Professors' House, built 1839

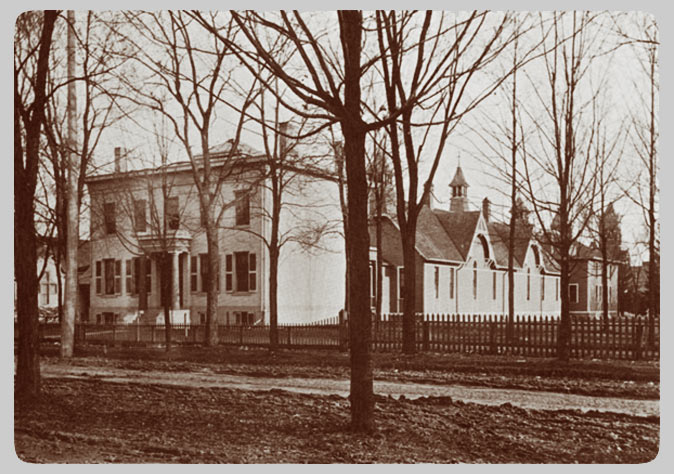
Northwest Professors' House, built 1839

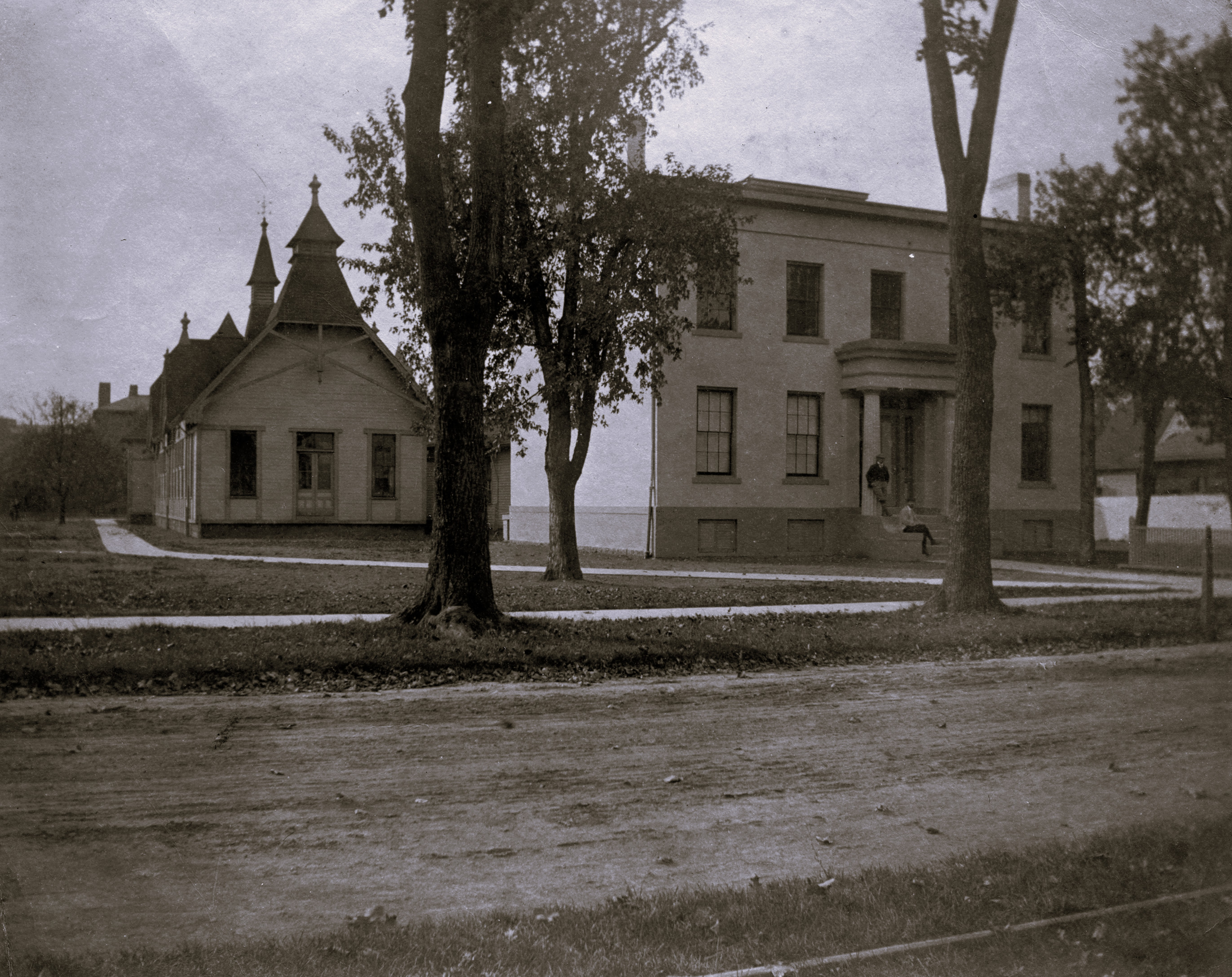
Northeast Professors' House, built 1839

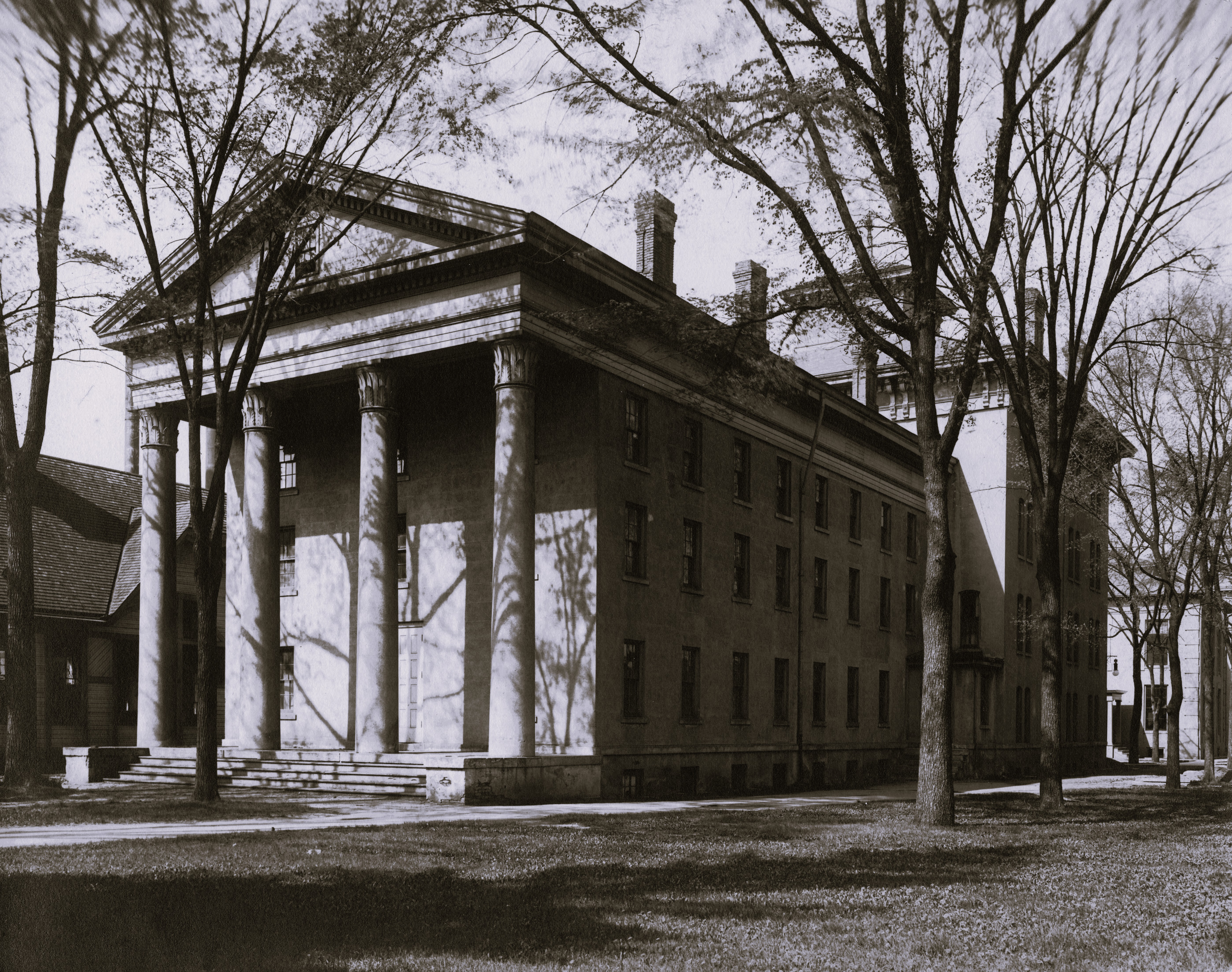
Old Medical Building, built 1848

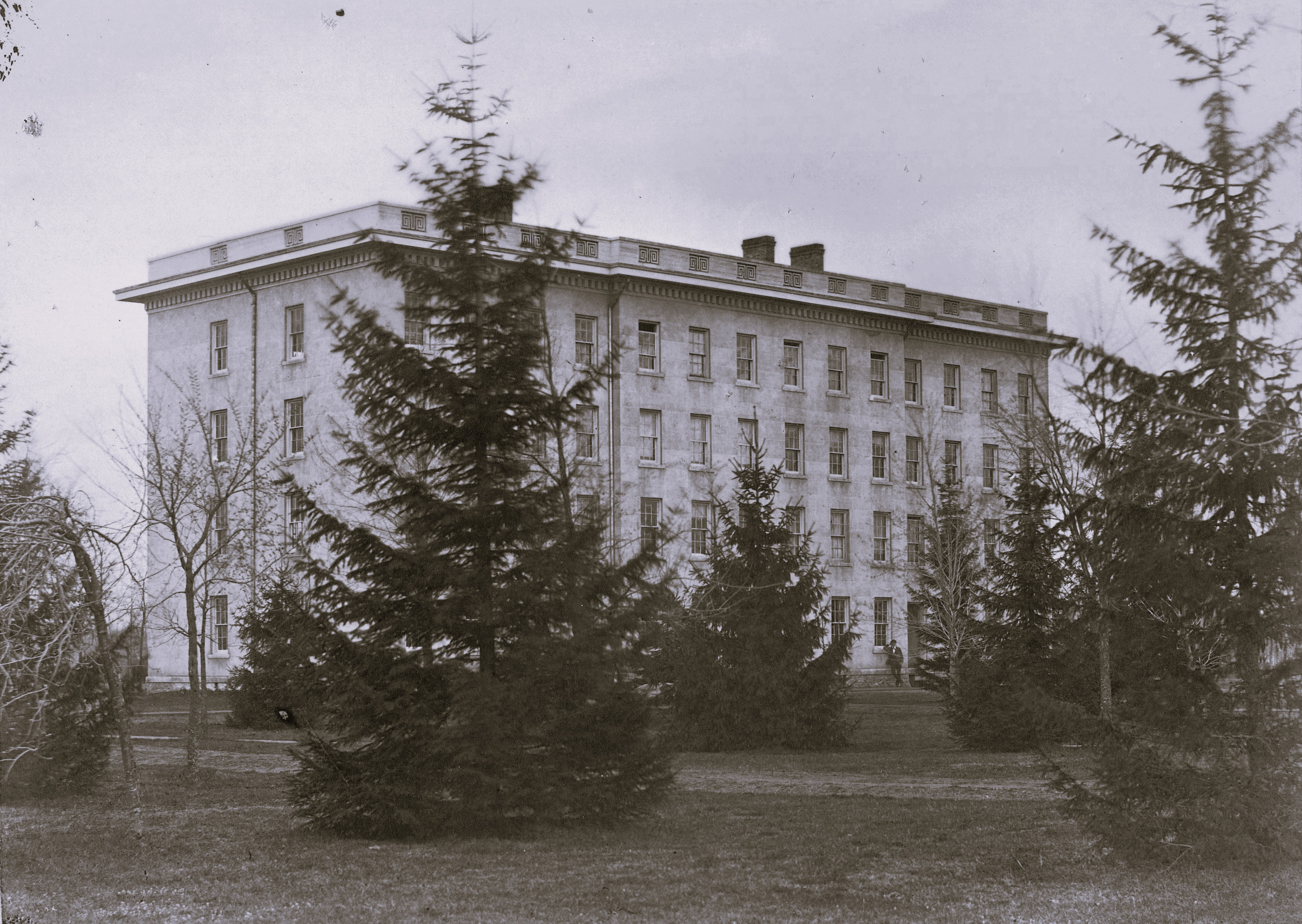
South College, built 1849

=== University branch schools ===
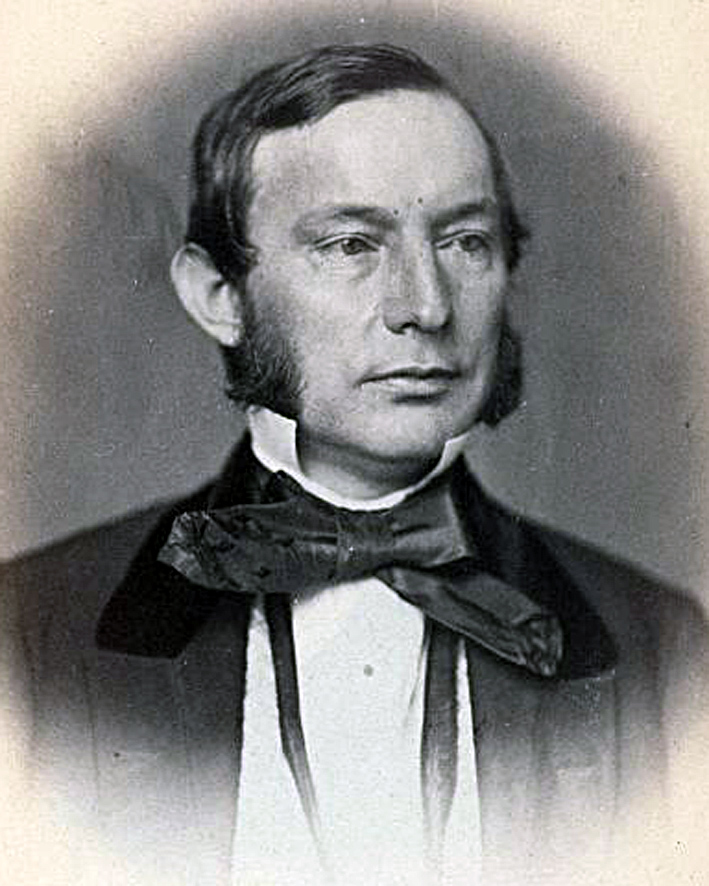
Anson Burlingame, the United States Minister to the Qing Empire from 1862 to 1867, studied at the Detroit Branch School between 1838 and 1841

In the years following the university's establishment in Ann Arbor, the regents created branches of the university throughout the state. The most notable of these was the Detroit Branch School, which opened in the former University Building on Bates Street. During a regents meeting on November 14, 1837, R. C. Gibson advocated for a branch in Detroit, and on November 18, the trustees of the old university's proposal was accepted. At a subsequent regents meeting, a fund was allocated to support the branches, with each branch receiving a portion of the fund for the salary of a teacher, along with a proportionate share of the fund based on their student enrollment.

On January 10, 1838, the following Board of Visitors for the Detroit Branch was appointed: Jonathan Kearsley, Charles Christopher Trowbridge, Benjamin F. H. Witherell, Peter Morey, and Charles Moran, with John Owen serving as treasurer. The building for the Detroit Branch was not ready for use until June 20, 1838, after extensive renovations, and it opened for boys with one principal and one assistant. Four terms were scheduled each year, and the first public examination took place on August 14 and 15, 1838. Most of the students at the Detroit branch school were parishioners of Ste. Anne, often seen during the church's festive days and at High Mass. Notable alumni included Anson Burlingame and E. C. Walker. Additionally, William Woodbridge, John Biddle, Elisha W. McKinstry, Orlando B. Willcox, J. Hyatt Smith, and W. L. Whipple, brother of Charles W. Whipple, were also associated with various societies at the school.

Other branches were established throughout the state as preparatory schools for the university in Pontiac, Kalamazoo, Niles, Tecumseh, White Pigeon, and Romeo. However, these branches struggled to enroll students, leading some to merge with local colleges. Notably, Kalamazoo College operated as the Kalamazoo Branch of the University of Michigan from 1840 to 1850.

== Michigan under Henry Philip Tappan, 1852 to 1863 ==
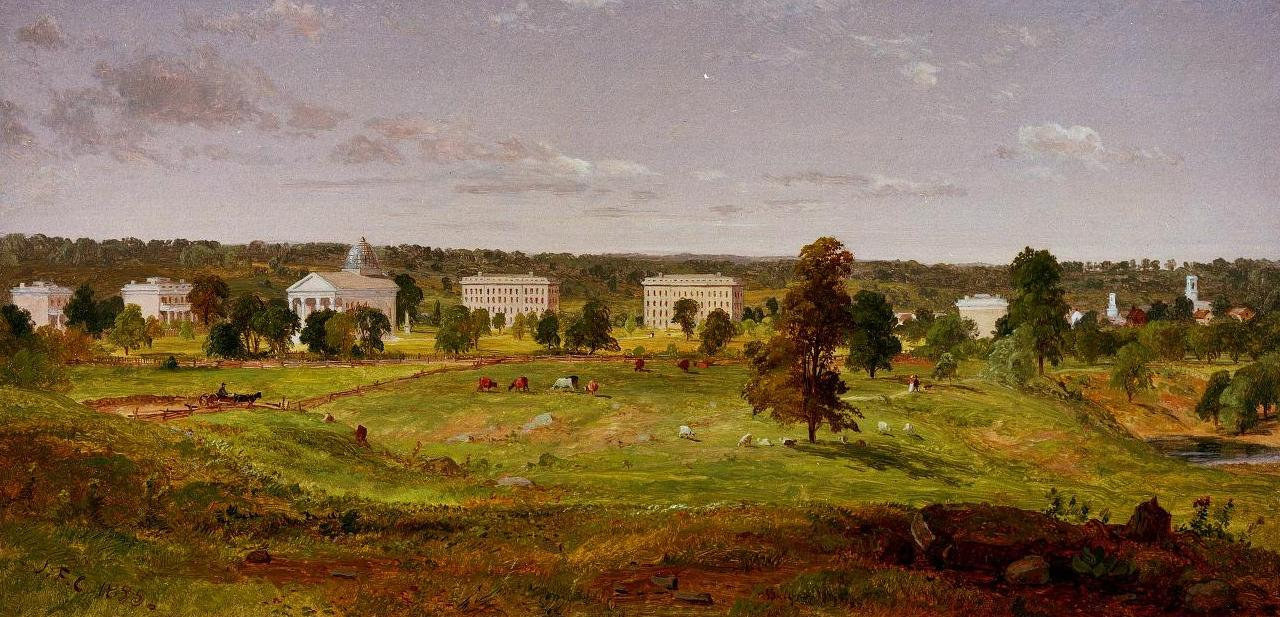
University of Michigan (1855) by Jasper Francis Cropsey, depicting a view of The Diag. From left to right: the Engineering Building (1839–1922), the President’s House (1839), the Medical Building (1848–1914), South College (1849–1950), and Mason Hall (1841–1950)

Henry Philip Tappan became the university's first president in 1852, with the ambition to shape the institution as a model for future universities. During his decade of service, he overhauled the curriculum, expanded the library and museum collections, established the law school, and supervised the construction of the Detroit Observatory.

Tappan's tenure also saw the creation of the Michigan Glee Club, the oldest student organization at the university, and the publication of the first student newspaper, The Peninsular Phoenix and Gazetteer, in 1857.

Despite these accomplishments, Tappan's 11-year presidency was marked by considerable tension. His impartial stance on religion faced backlash during a time of heightened religious fervor. Due to changes in the Board of Regents and discontent with his administration, he was forced to resign in 1863.

=== Meritocracy and secularism ===
One of Tappan's major reforms was the secularization of faculty appointments, prioritizing merit in selections and breaking away from the backward tradition of regents distributing positions among Protestant denominations.

=== Law and science ===
In 1855, Michigan became the second university in the country to issue Bachelor of Science degrees. The following year, the country's first chemical laboratory was built on campus, specifically designed for chemistry education, providing additional space for classes and laboratories.

In 1858, a committee was appointed to establish a law department, and by the following year, the law school was founded, with James V. Campbell, Charles I. Walker, and Thomas M. Cooley appointed to the faculty, delivering the first class in October.

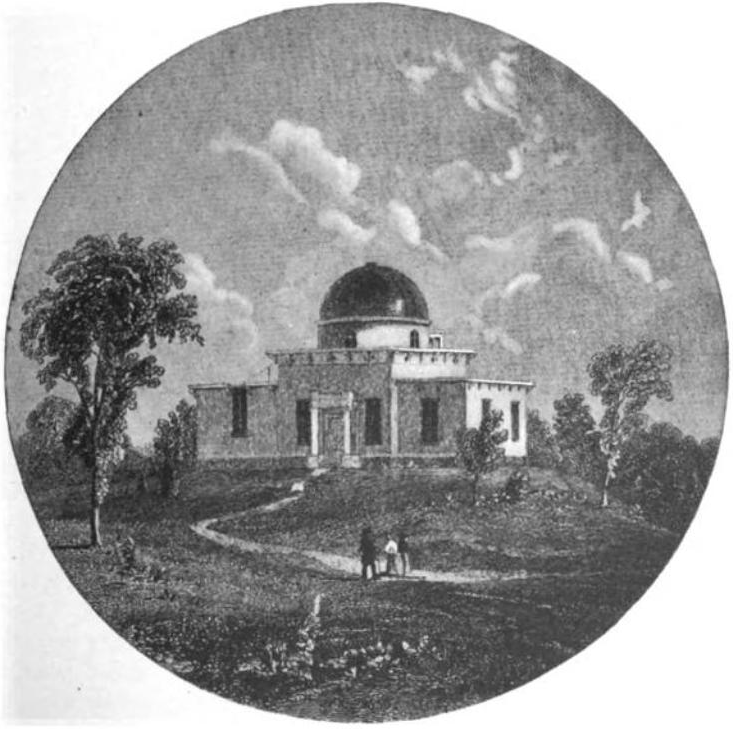
Detroit Observatory, built 1853

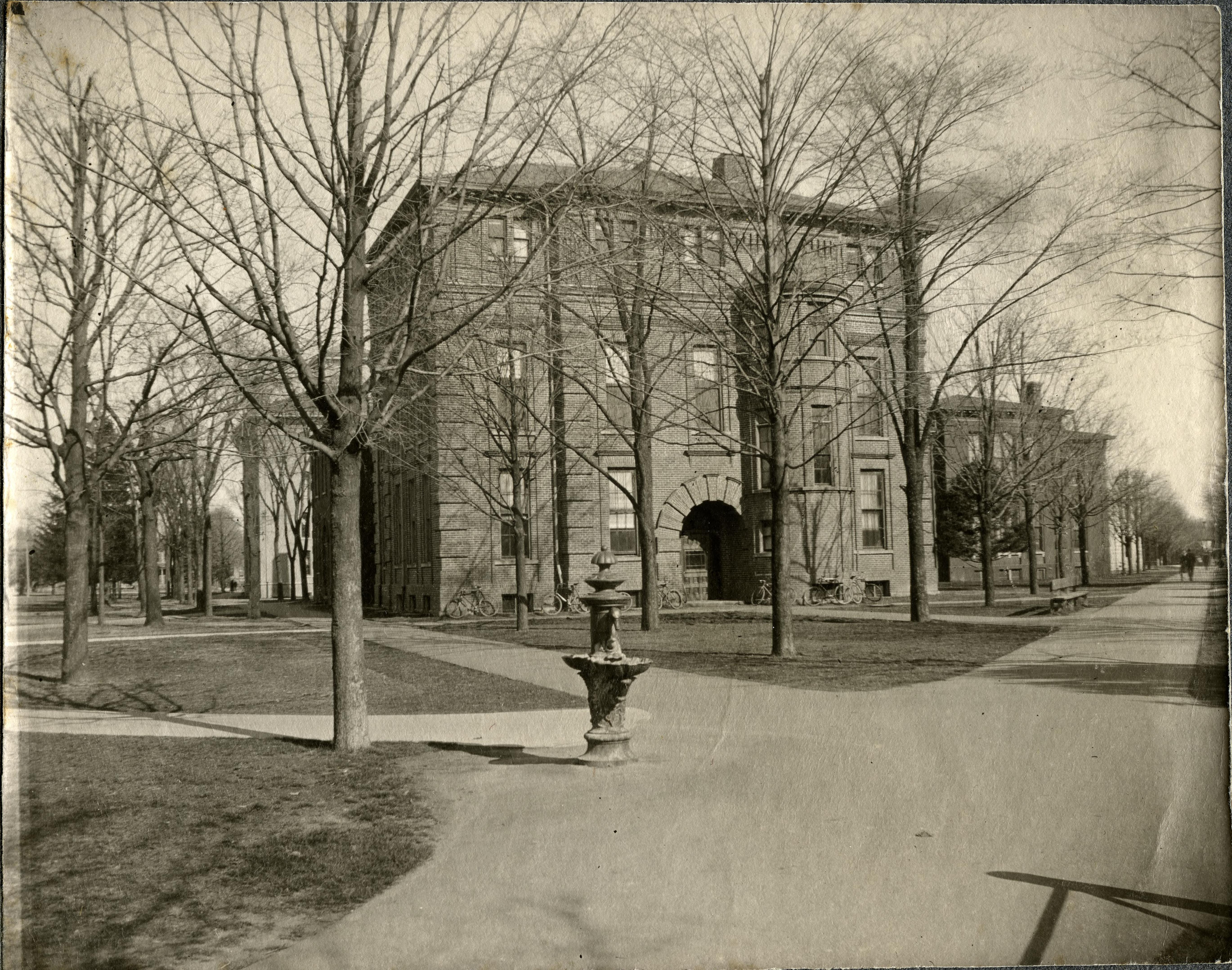
Chemical Laboratory, built 1856

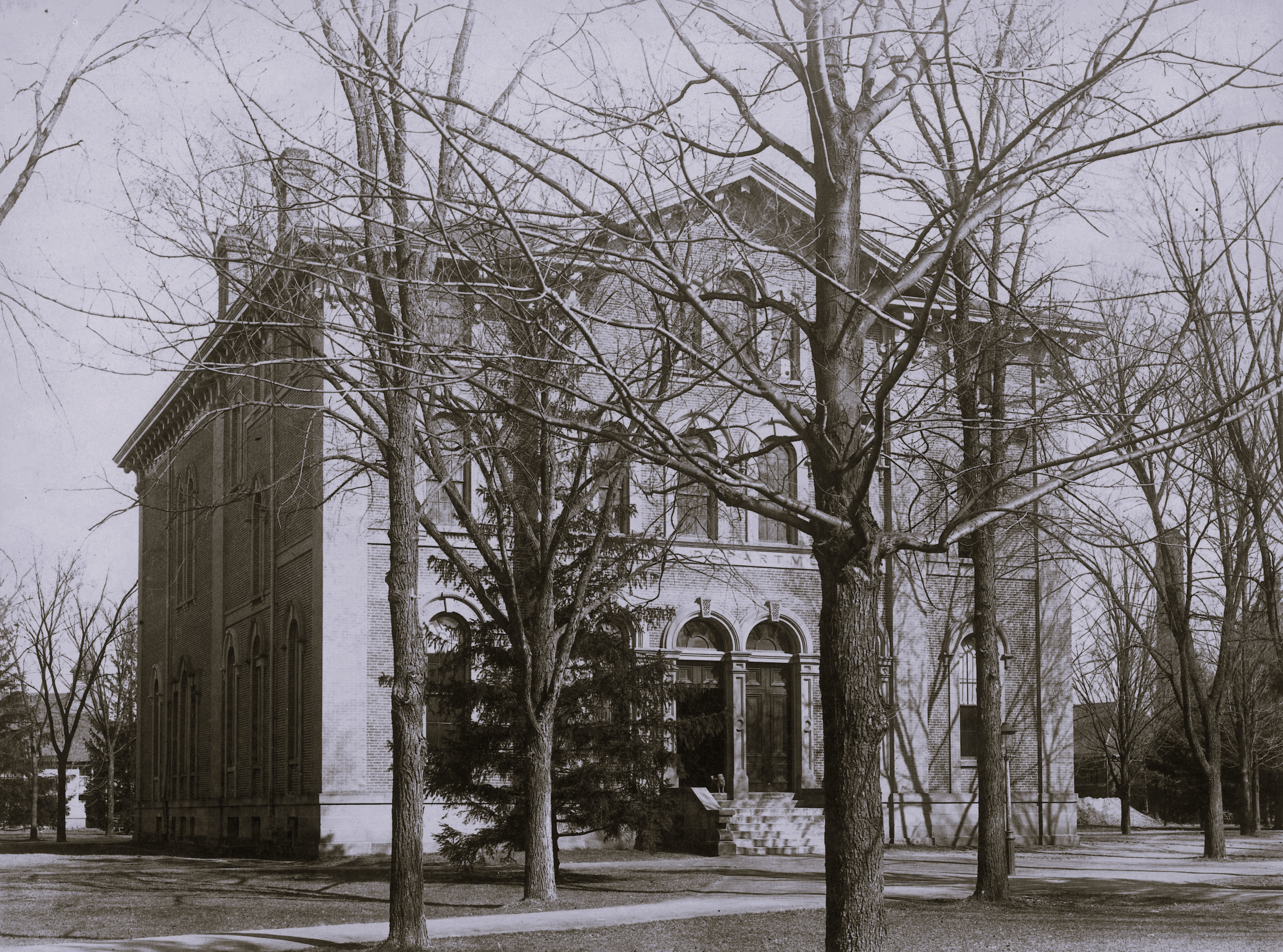
Old Haven Hall, 1863

=== Influence in Michigan and the Union ===
Many institutions across the country trace their origins to graduates of the university during Tappan's tenure, either being founded or significantly influenced by its alumni, including much of the state's vocational schools from that period. Among these alumni are Jay Hubbell, who was instrumental in founding the Michigan Mining School in 1885; Theodore Andrews McGraw, the physician who founded the Detroit Medical College in 1868; and Charles F. R. Bellows, the first principal of the Central Michigan Normal School and Business Institute.

Charles Kendall Adams, the second president of Cornell University, studied at the university during this period under Andrew Dickson White, Cornell's first president, from which he graduated in 1861. In the founding of the University of California in the 1860s, Governor Frederick Low favored the establishment of a state university modeled after the University of Michigan. The university belonged to an elite group of institutions that significantly influenced the development of modern American higher education from 1865 to 1910.

== Michigan during the Civil War ==
In 1863, Erastus Otis Haven took office as president, having been a professor at the time and needing to prove his right for the presidency. The campus was divided by conflicting views among students, faculty, and regents regarding Tappan's restoration, the homeopathy crisis, and the Civil War. Haven's administration faced routine administrative difficulties and struggled to garner support for increased state aid, despite achieving modest gains. The university, which had received a fixed $15,000 since 1869, still required additional funding. Frustrated, Haven resigned in 1869 to become president of Northwestern, a Methodist institution, a move that sectarians viewed as a setback for secular colleges.

The presidency remained vacant from 1869 to 1871, with Professor Henry Simmons Frieze serving as acting president. During this period, the university raised funds for University Hall, overhauled admissions with a diploma system, and introduced coeducation. Frieze, a champion of music education, also established the University Musical Society.

By the late 1860s, the university had become one of the largest in the nation, alongside Harvard in Cambridge. The growing student body led to unruliness. In 1872, Ann Arbor hosted 49 saloons, and the spectacle of student intoxication and public donnybrooks concerned school administrators and state politicians. Frieze attributed these problems to a lack of centralized faculty control.

The university's first known African American student, Samuel C. Watson, was admitted as a medical student in 1853. In 1870, Gabriel Franklin Hargo graduated from the law school as the second African American to graduate from a law school in the United States.

=== Women at Michigan ===
Women at Michigan

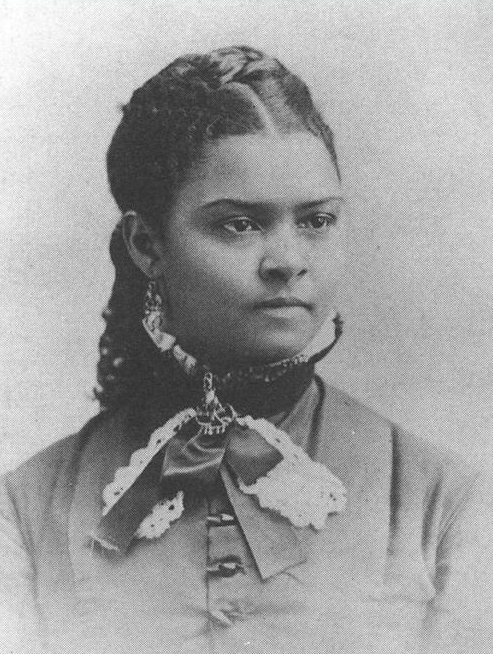
Mary Henrietta Graham, the first African-American woman to be admitted to the university in 1876

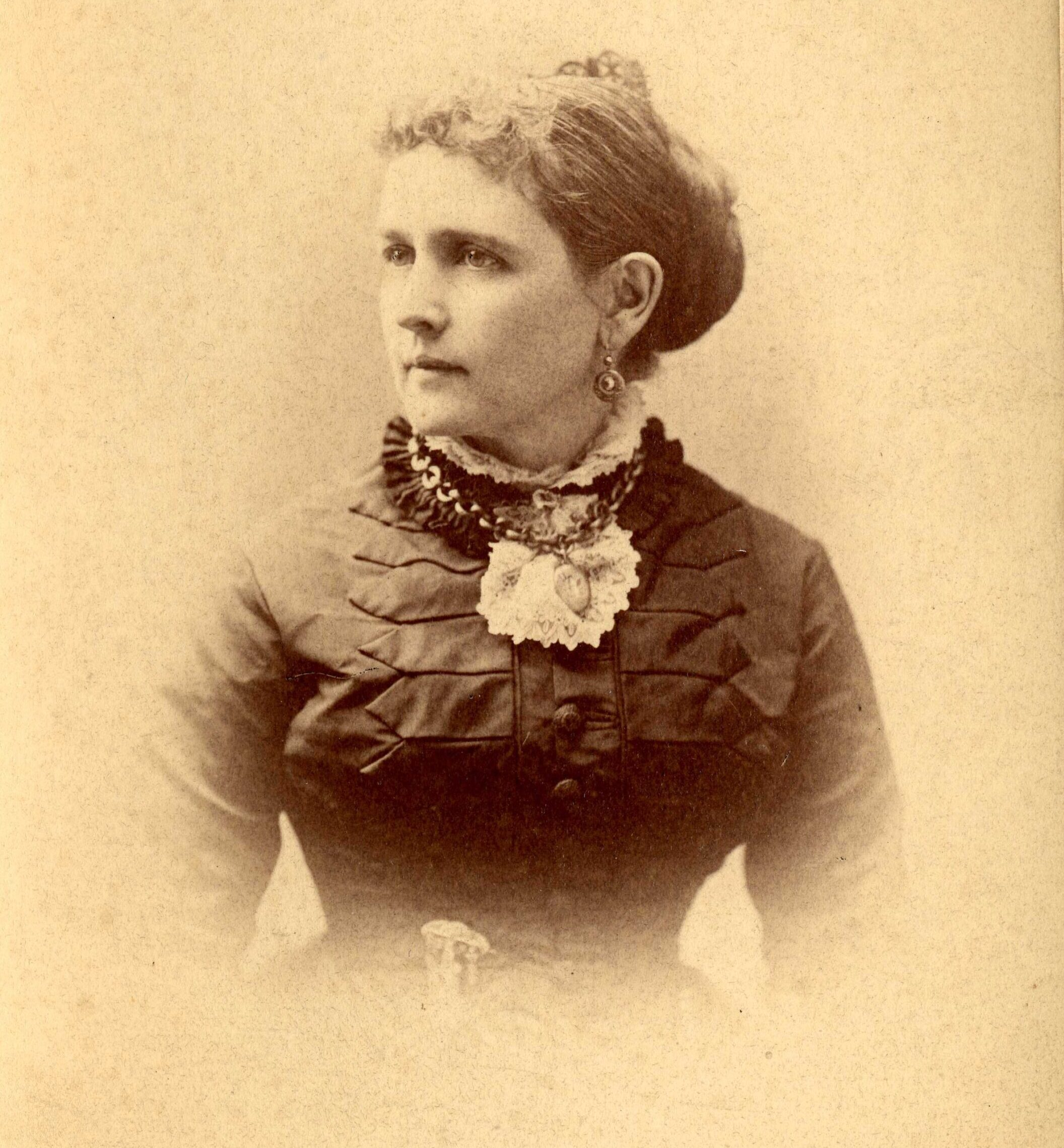
Madelon Stockwell, the first woman to earn a bachelor's degree from the university and namesake of Stockwell Hall

The push for coeducation at the university began in 1858 with a motion from Sarah Burger Stearns, a leader in the woman's suffrage movement. She organized twelve young women to submit the first formal application for admission of women to the university. This initiative was preceded by the establishment of the Ladies' Academy in 1804 by Gabriel Richard, which was staffed by four female teachers, and the founding of a female seminary in 1835, resulting from a society incorporated in 1830 to promote female education. The seminary was discontinued in 1842, and the property was transferred to the state in trust for the university.

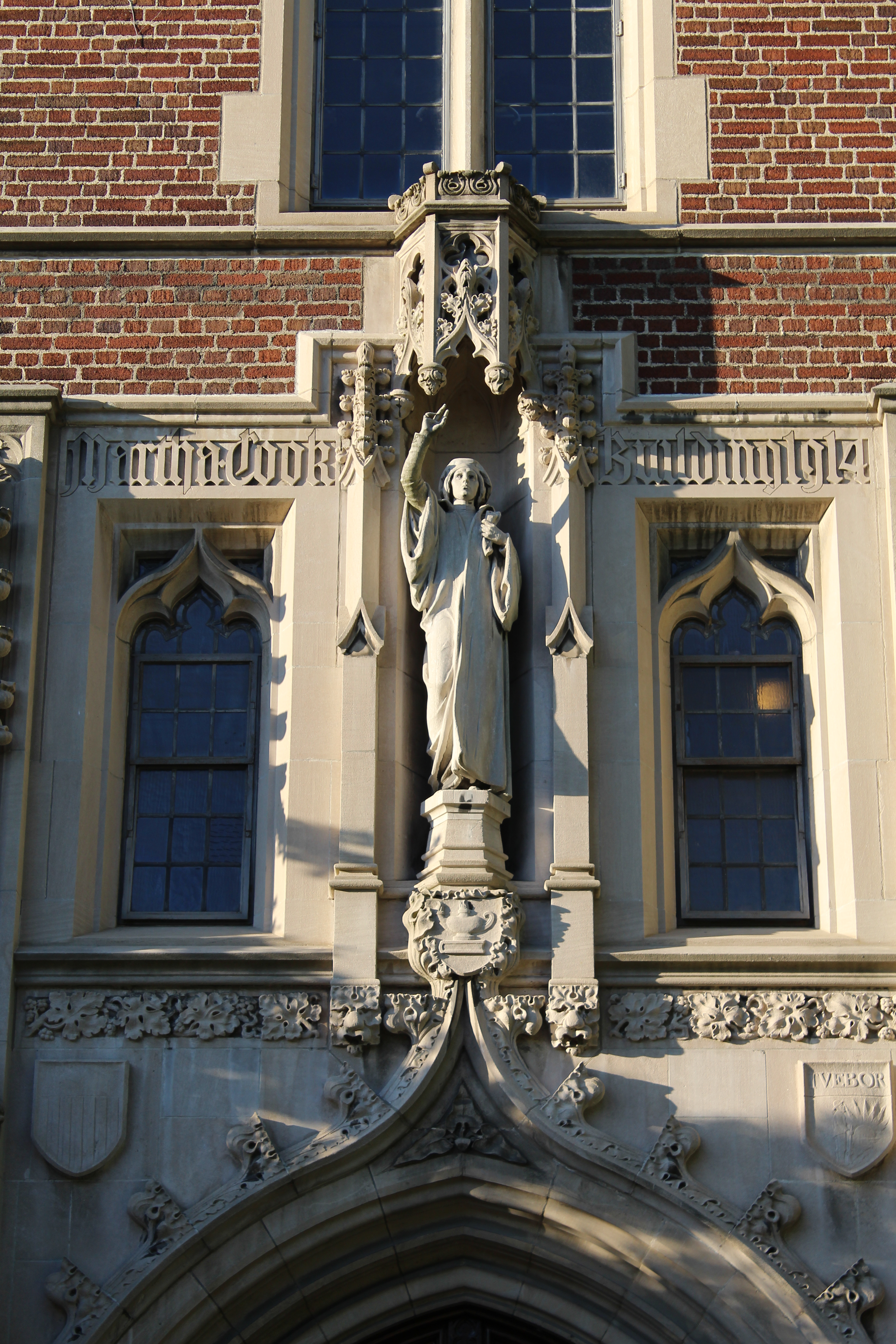
Statue of Portia (1918), created by the Piccirilli Brothers, located above the front entrance of the Martha Cook Building

In response to Stearns's action, President Henry Tappan stated, "It seems inexpedient, at present, for the University to admit ladies." The following year, thousands of Michigan citizens signed a petition for women's admission to the university, which was presented to the board of regents. In 1866, Alice Robinson Boise Wood became the first woman to attend classes at the university. However, it was not until 1867, when the state legislature adopted a joint resolution favoring women's admission alongside men, and subsequently, the board of regents passed a resolution allowing women to enroll in 1870, that the history of coeducation at the university began. Thereafter, Madelon Louisa Stockwell became the first woman to officially register. The first known African American woman admitted to the university was Mary Henrietta Graham, who enrolled in 1876.

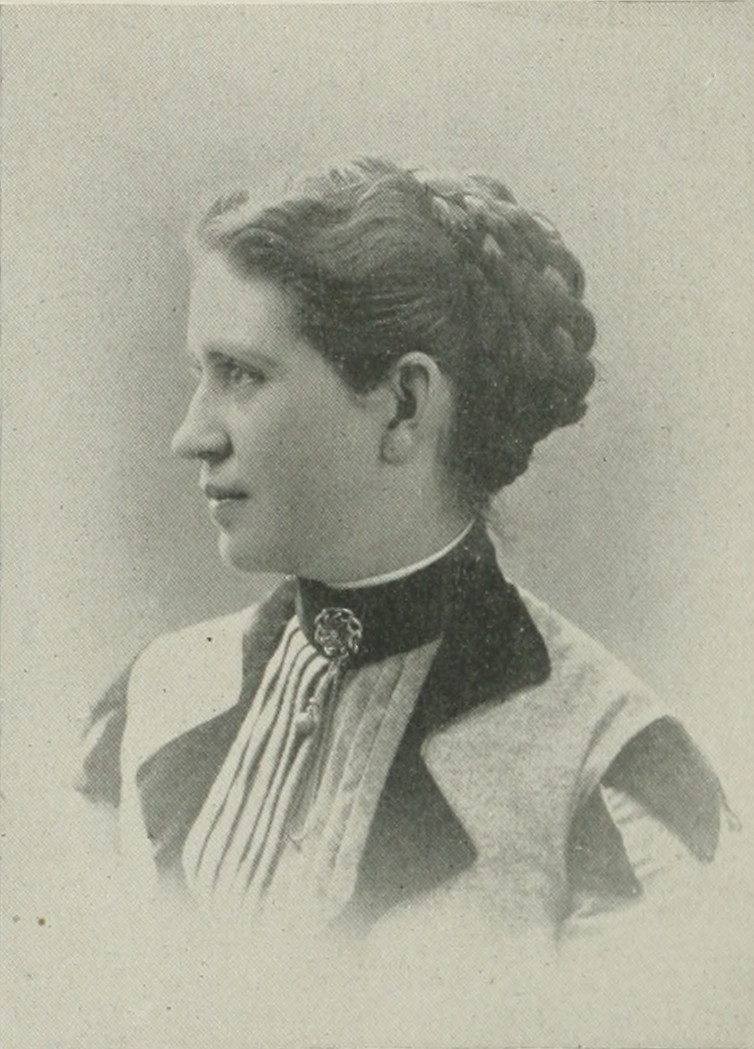
Louisa Reed Stowell, the university's first female instructor

Women's professional education at Michigan began in 1871 when Sarah Killgore became the first female law student. She holds the distinction of being the first woman admitted to the bar in any state in the country. In 1885, Sophia Bethena Jones made history as the university's first African American woman to graduate with a medical degree; she later founded the nursing program at Spelman College. That same year, June Rose Colby became the first woman to earn a Ph.D. in literature from the university. In 1890, Ida Gray became the first African American woman to graduate in dentistry from the university, earning a D.D.S. degree that was the first conferred on a woman of African descent in the country. Tomo Inouye made history in 1901 as the first Japanese woman to graduate from the medical school. In 1917, Regent Levi Barbour established a fellowship program at the university for Asian women seeking professional degrees in the United States. One of the first Barbour scholars, Wu Yi-Fang, earned her Ph.D. in 1928 and went on to become the first woman college president in China, leading Ginling College. In 1931, another Barbour scholar, Janaki Ammal, made history as the first Indian woman to obtain a doctorate in botany in the country.

In 1875 Eliza Maria Mosher became the university's first dean of women, overseeing female students' affairs. Two years later, in 1877, Louisa Reed Stowell became the first female instructor. The first women's society, the Quadratic Club, was formed in 1876. Barbour Gymnasium for women opened in 1886, followed by the exclusively female Michigan League in 1890. In 1905, a women's athletic association was formed, which created women's baseball, hockey, and basketball teams.

== Michigan under James Burrill Angell, 1871 to 1909 ==
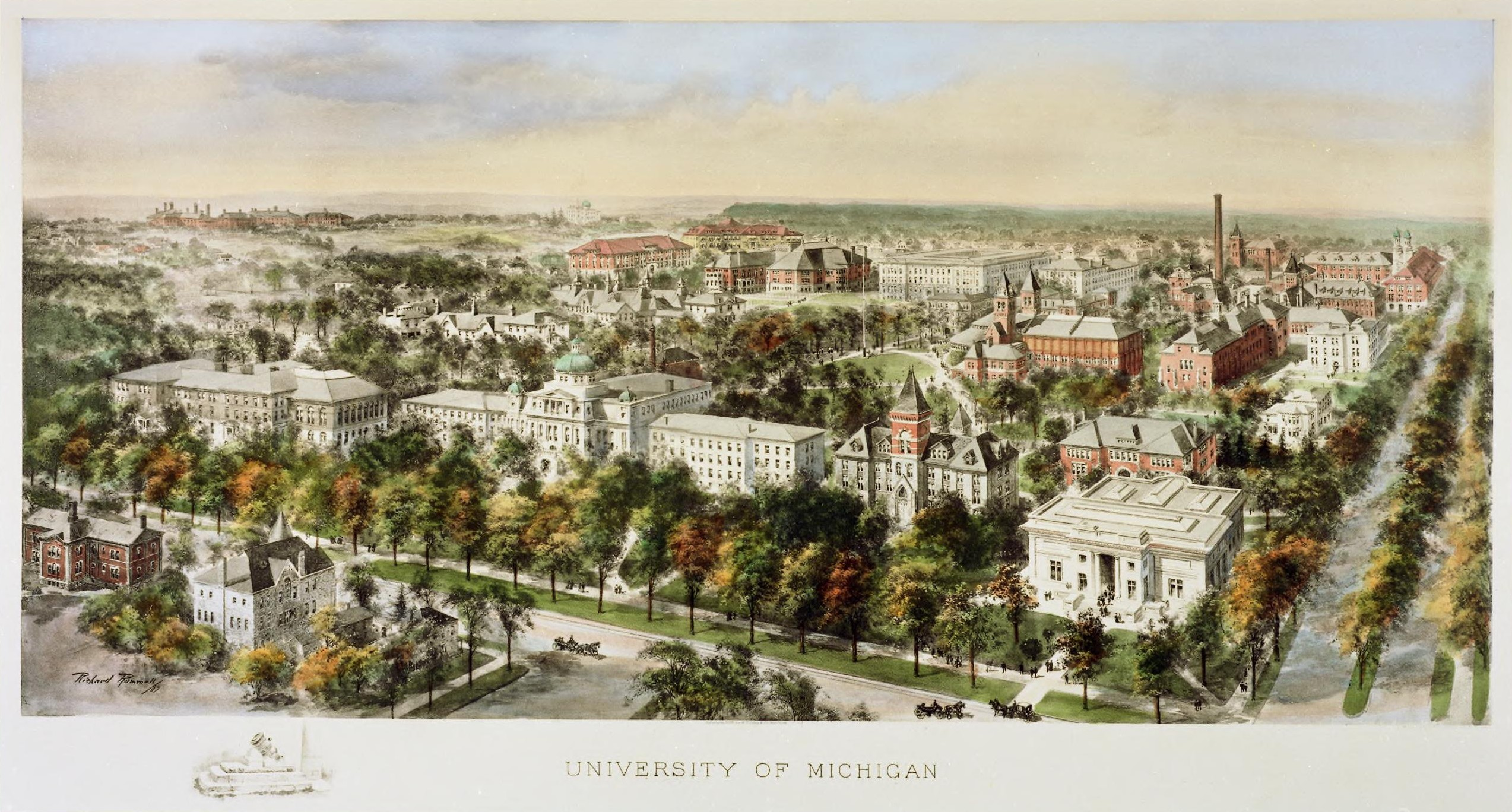
A hand-colored lithograph depicting a view of the University of Michigan by Richard Rummell in 1907

James Burrill Angell became president in 1871 and would remain in the post for nearly four decades. His tenure would be remembered as the most successful in the university's history. Tappan's reforms in the 1850s set the university on a path to becoming an elite institution, but it was Angell who completed that transformation. Shortly after Angell's arrival, University Hall was completed at vast expense; it would remain the university's major academic building right up until the 1950s.

During his presidency, Angell restored campus discipline, raised entrance and graduation requirements, and persuaded the legislature to increase state aid. Angell's tenure saw the addition of many extracurricular activities, including the intercollegiate football team. Though a reformer, Angell was not authoritarian; he encouraged open debate and aimed for near-unanimous agreement before implementing changes, rather than pushing through with only a narrow majority. This approach enabled him to address knotty issues on campus, including the long-standing homeopathy problem.

Angell retired in 1909, and seven years later, he died in the President's House, which had been his home for forty-five years. His successor, Harry Burns Hutchins, who was once his student, would lead the university through World War I and the Great Influenza epidemic.

=== Liberalism ===
The university during this period was known for its liberalism. Harper's Weekly published an article in July 1887 that noted the school's "broad and liberal spirit" and the wide-ranging freedoms of its students.

=== Doctoral and professional degrees ===
Angell transformed the curriculum to focus on electives, expanding course offerings to include and expand professional studies in dentistry, architecture, engineering, government, and medicine. That led to a faculty of great minds in many fields, from John Dewey in philosophy to Frederick George Novy in bacteriology.

In 1875, the university founded the College of Dental Surgery, followed by the establishment of the College of Pharmacy by Albert B. Prescott in 1876. That year, the university awarded its first Doctor of Philosophy degrees: to Victor C. Vaughan in chemistry and William E. Smith in zoology. They were among the first doctoral degrees to be conferred in the nation.

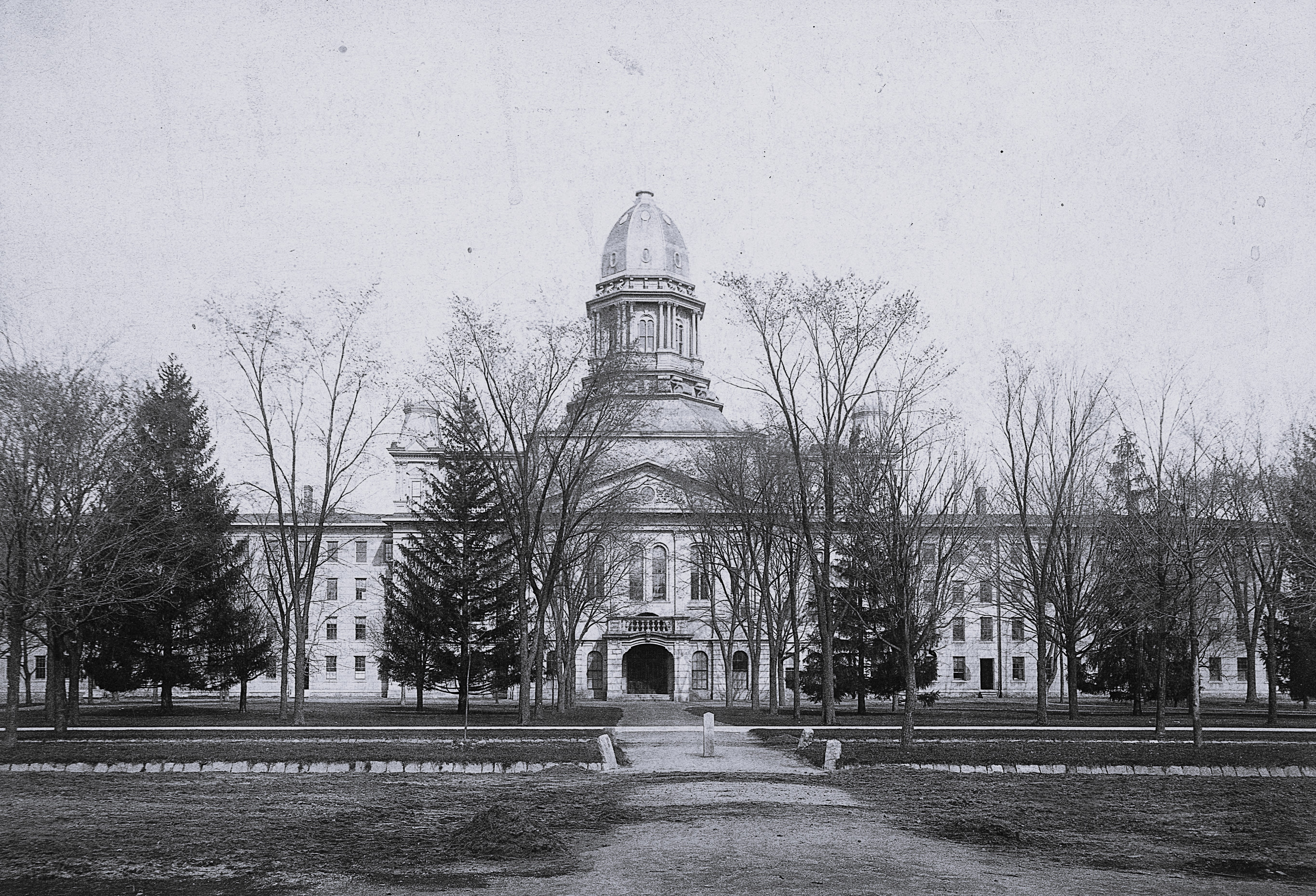
University Hall, built 1871

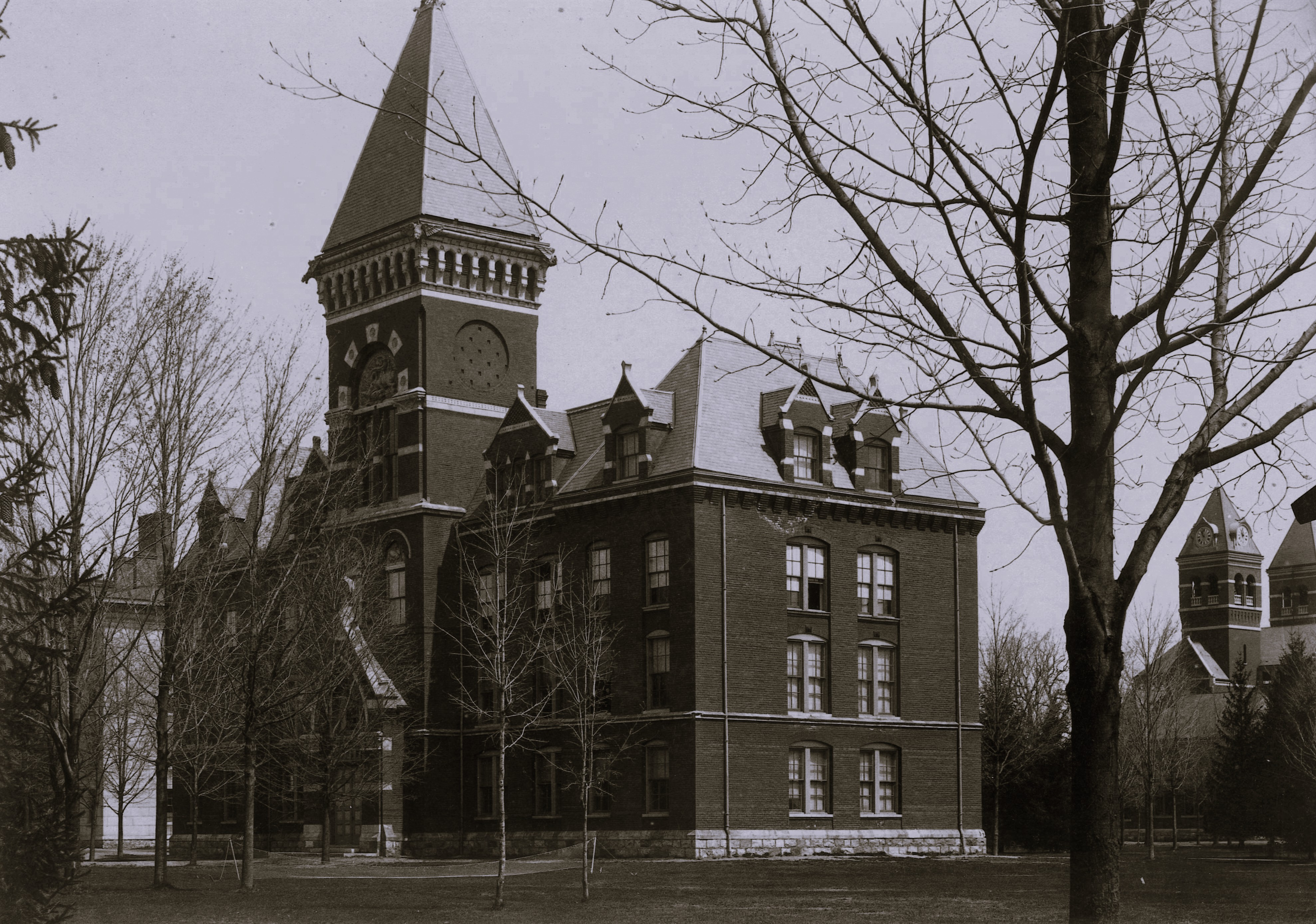
University Museum, built 1880

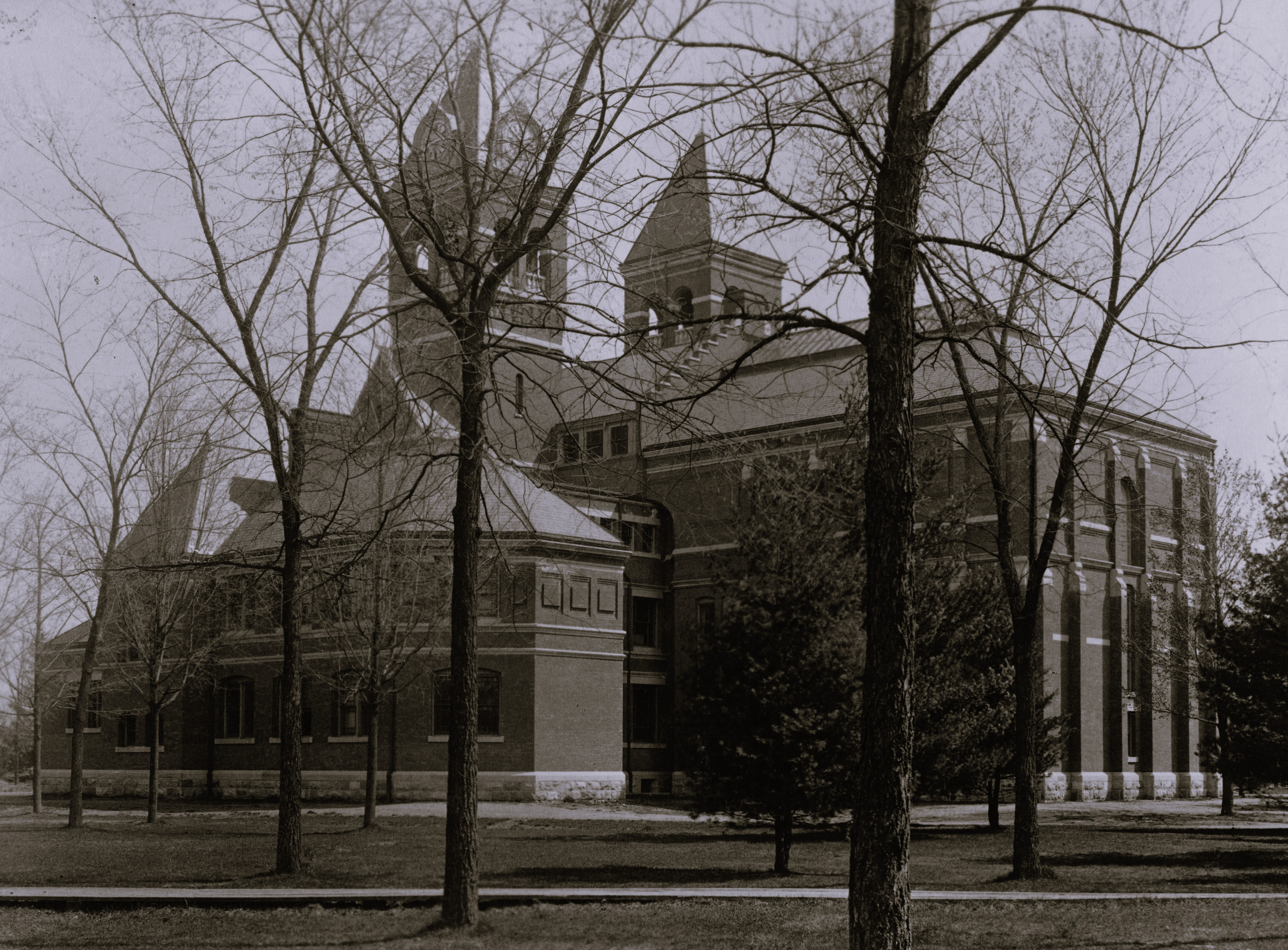
Old Library, built 1881

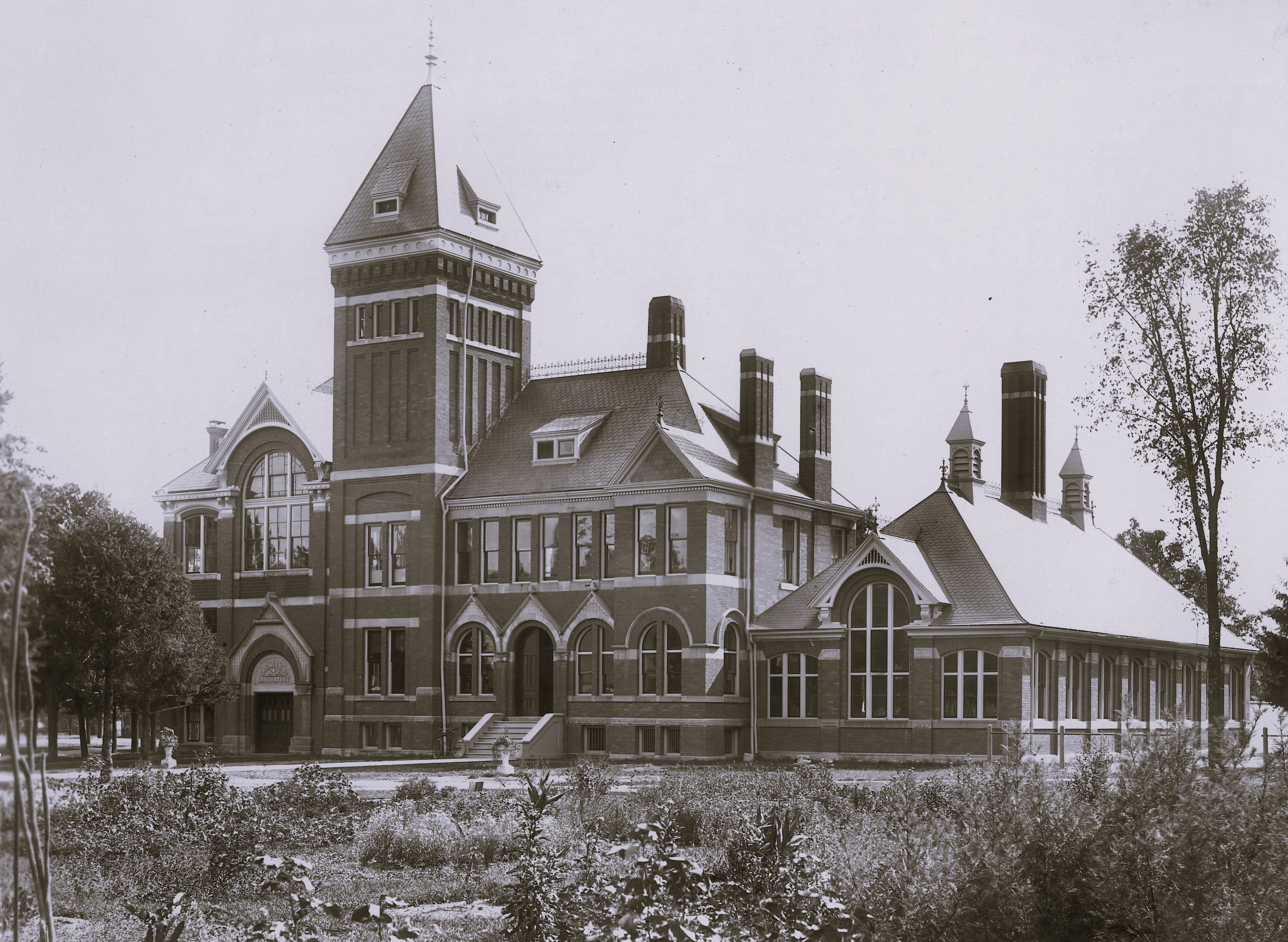
Engineering Shops, built 1885

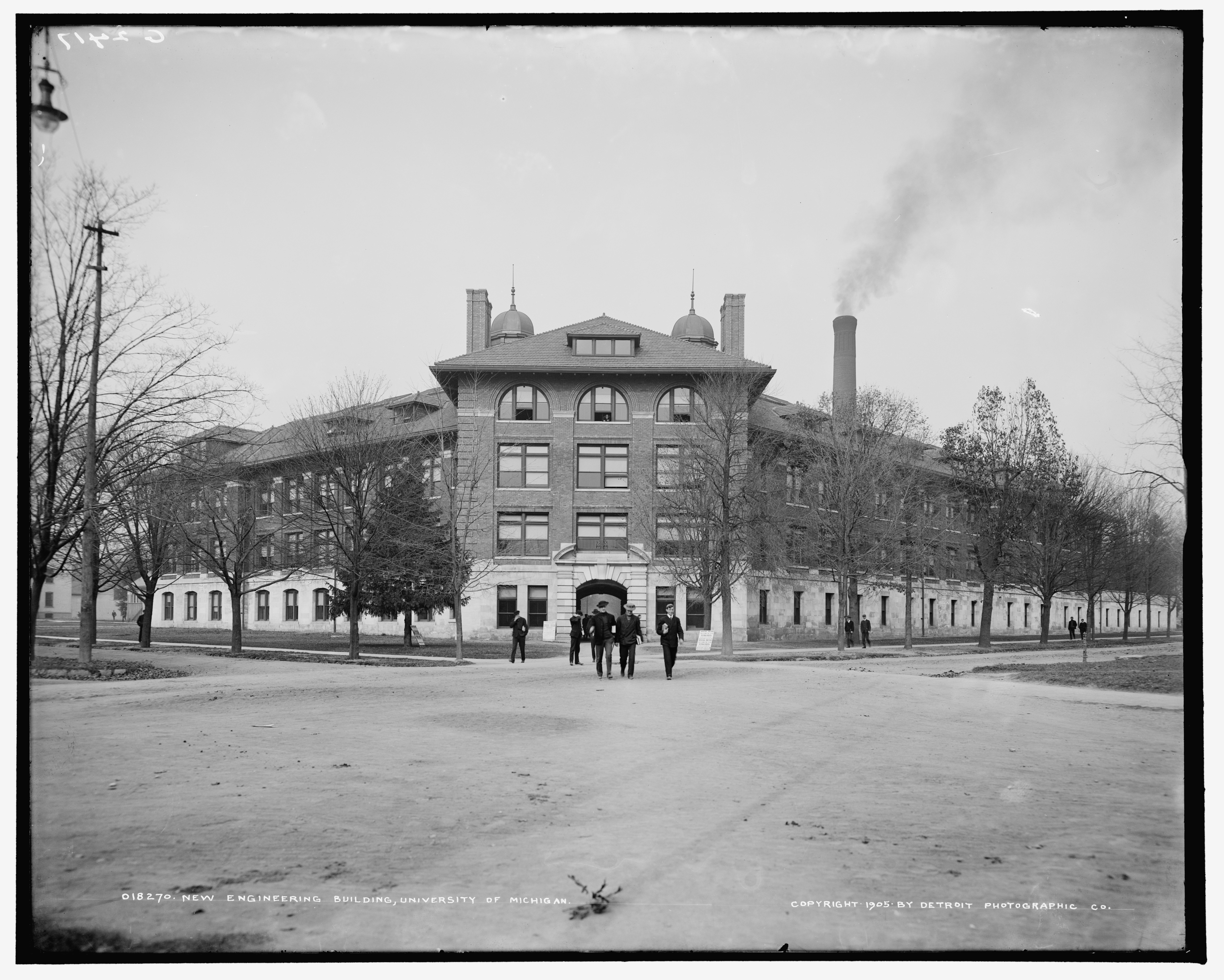
Engineering Building, built 1904

=== Collegiate sports ===
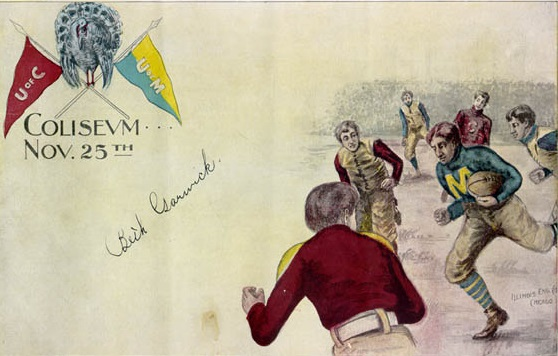
Souvenir program from 1897 for the Chicago–Michigan football rivalry game

Angell's tenure saw the addition of many extracurricular activities, including the intercollegiate football and tennis teams.

In 1896, the university joined the Intercollegiate Conference of Faculty Representatives but faced controversy in 1905 over college football's violence and professionalism. Stanford President David Starr Jordan accused Michigan and others of "professionalism," targeting coach Fielding Yost for recruiting non-student athletes. In response, Michigan President James Burrill Angell convened the 1906 Angell Conference, which implemented reforms, including faculty oversight of finances and a ban on professional coaches. Michigan was expelled from the Conference in 1907 for noncompliance but rejoined in 1917 after a nine-year absence.

In 1926, Harvard made an agreement to play football against Michigan, dropping Princeton from its schedule due to past rough matches. Princeton perceived this move as a threat to the "Big Three" relationship, fearing it would lose its status as a rival to Harvard and be relegated to a secondary class. By the 1930s, the 'Big Three' was restored and expanded into the Ivy League in 1939.

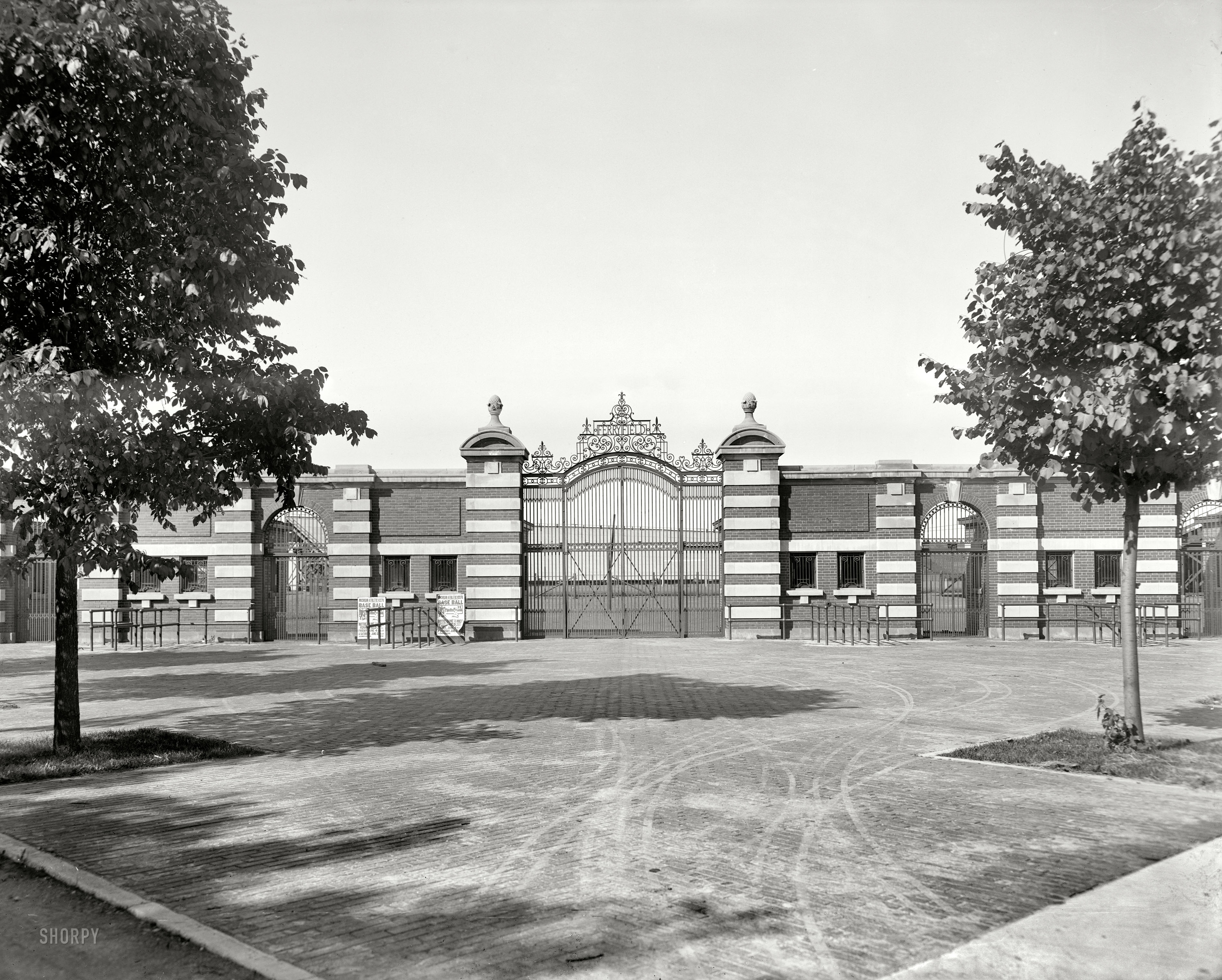
Ferry Field, opened 1906

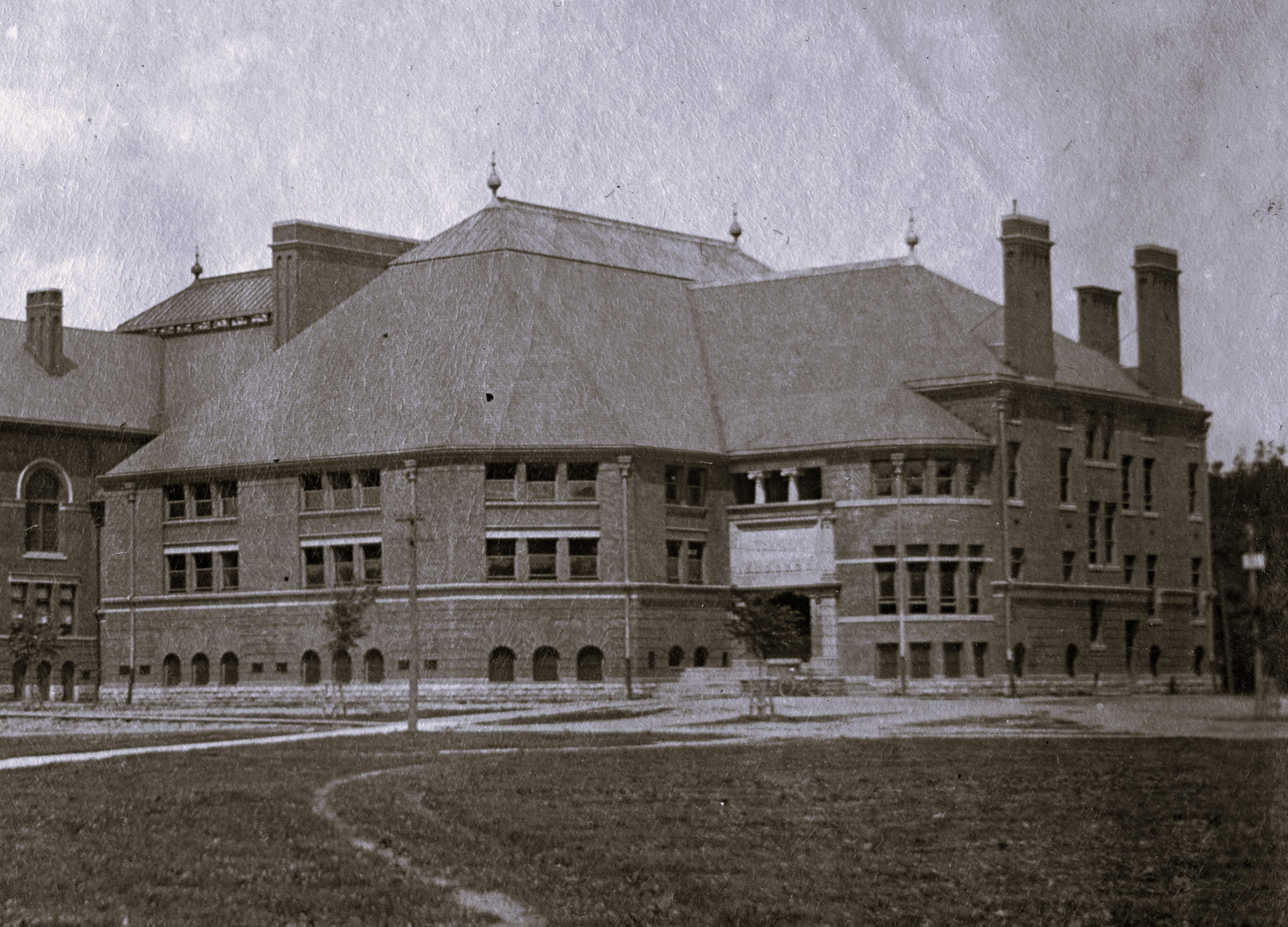
Waterman Gymnasium, built 1894

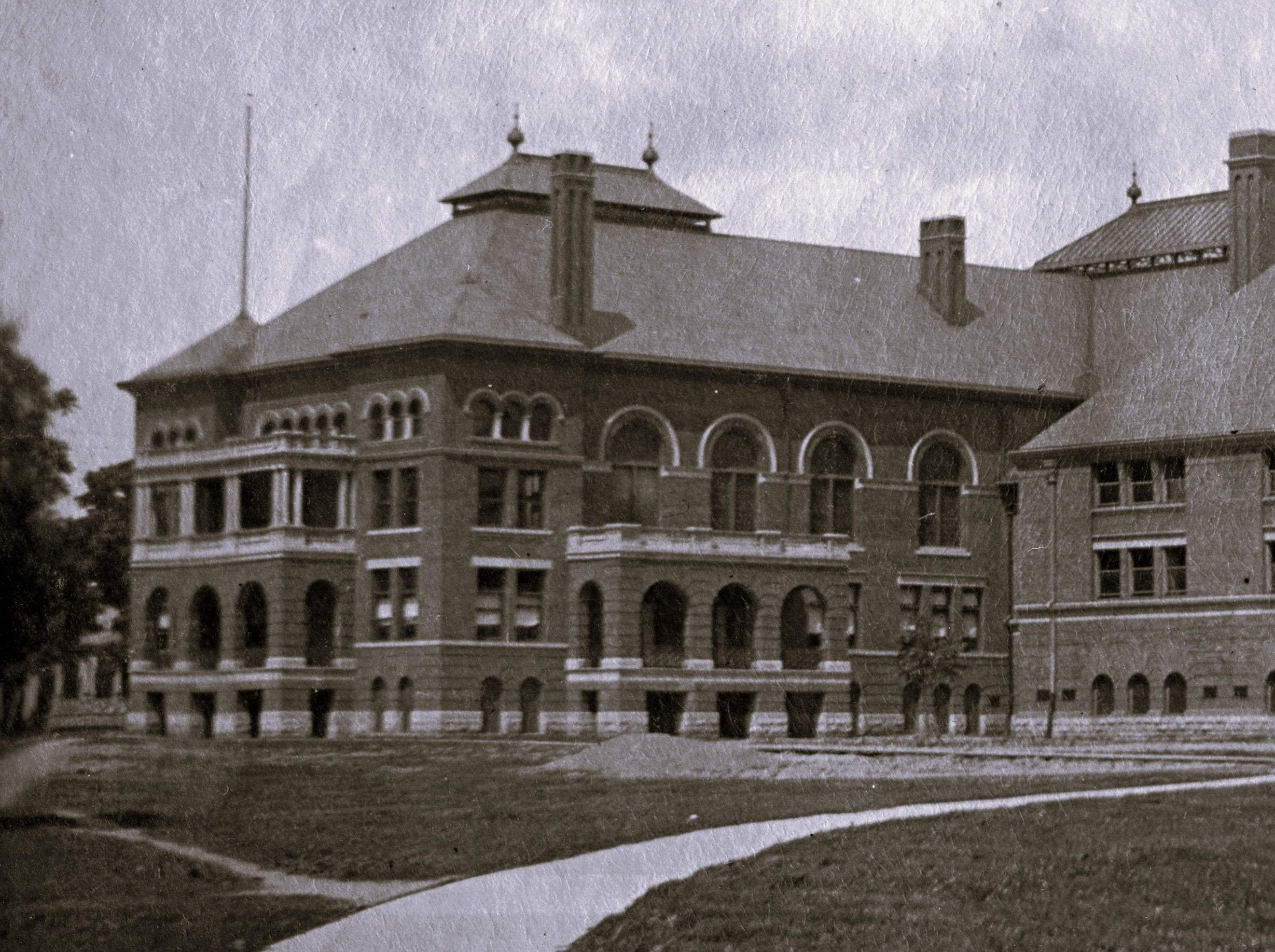
Barbour Gymnasium, built 1896

=== Civil education ===
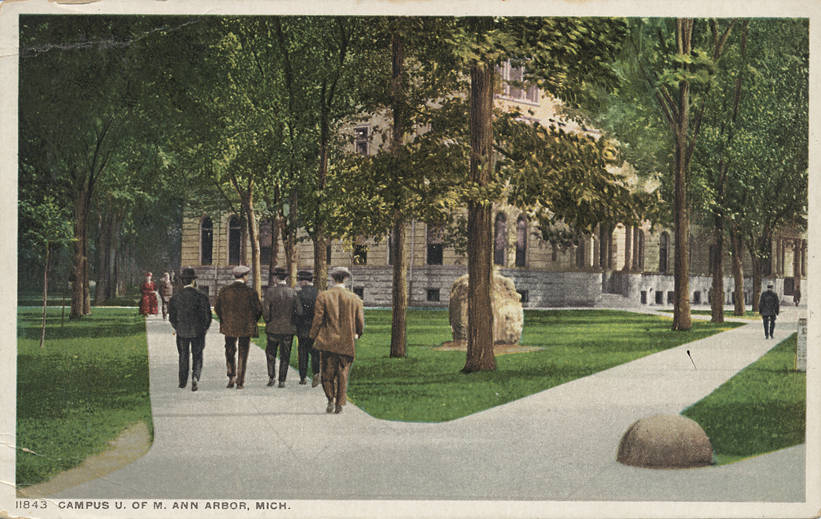
The Diag, ca. 1900

With his presidency, Angell focused the university on preparing a new generation of statesmen for public service. Angell himself was frequently called upon by the White House for diplomatic missions.

In 1880, President Rutherford Hayes appointed him as Minister to China, where he successfully negotiated an immigration treaty that facilitated foreign student enrollment. Later, in 1887, 1896, and 1897, President Grover Cleveland appointed him to fisheries and waterways commissions. That same year, President William McKinley named him Envoy Extraordinary to Turkey. By the late 19th century, the university had gained an international reputation, in large part due to Angell's diplomatic efforts. During this period, over eighty subjects of the Emperor of Japan were sent to Ann Arbor to study law as part of the opening of that empire to external influence. The university also played a key role in developing the Philippine education, legal, and public health systems during American colonization, largely due to the contributions of Michigan alumni like Dean Conant Worcester and George A. Malcolm.

== Michigan under Harry Burns Hutchins, 1910 to 1920 ==
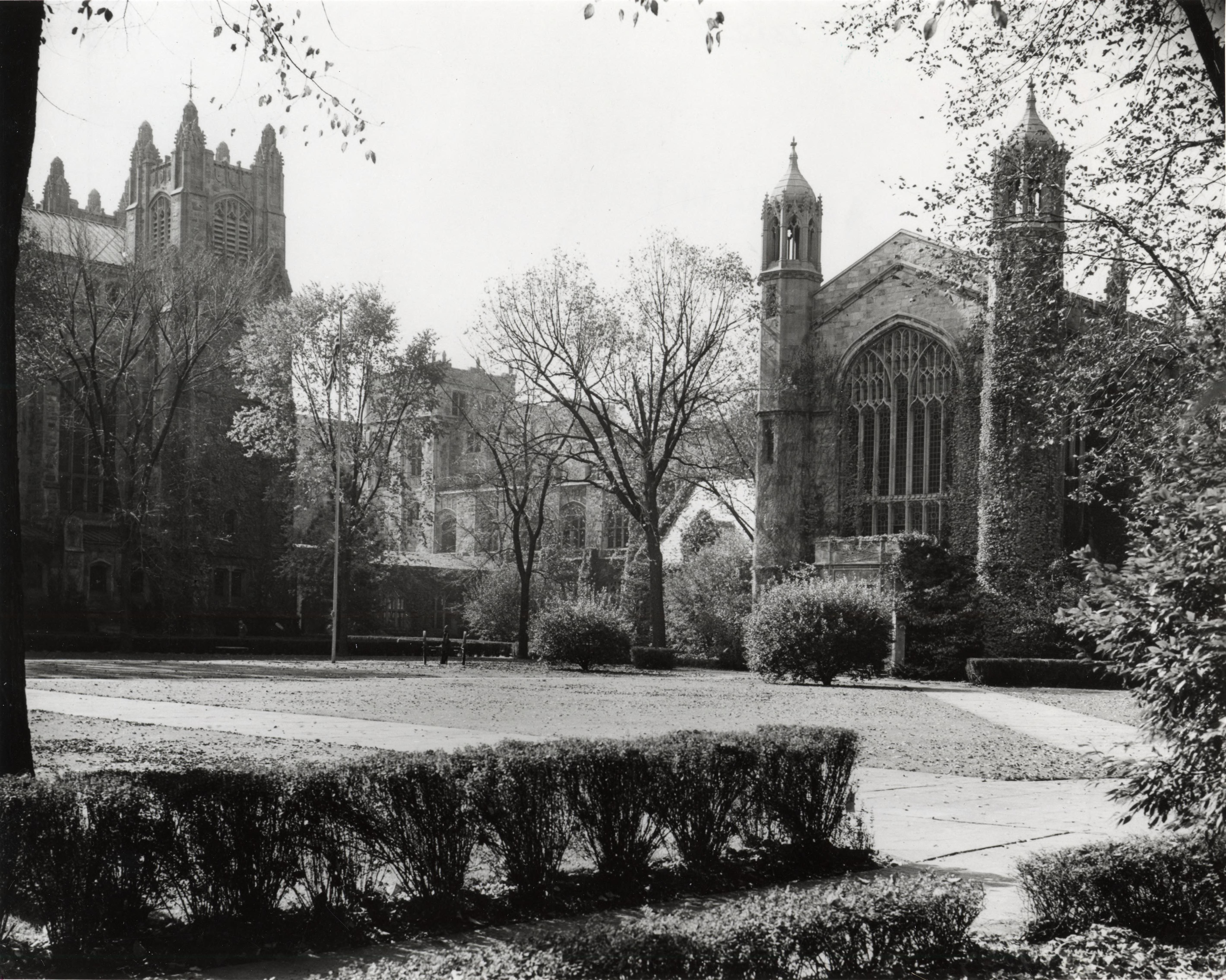
Law Quadrangle, ca. 1930s

West & east elevations of Michigan Union, 1917

In 1910, Harry Burns Hutchins assumed the presidency, becoming the first alumnus to hold that position. He had spent seven years in Ithaca, New York, where he was called by Andrew Dickson White and Charles Kendall Adams to establish the Cornell Law School. Hutchins then became the dean of the law school at his alma mater, where he introduced the case method of instruction. Hutchins was acting president when Angell was absent. During his presidency, Hutchins established the Graduate School, doubled enrollment, and increased the faculty.

Hutchins secured more state aid and alumni support to fund the university's capital needs, including the gothic Law Quadrangle, Martha Cook Building, Hill Auditorium, and Michigan Union, which became campus landmarks.

Hutchins enhanced the university health service, but wartime distractions plagued his presidency. The influenza epidemic, which caused student deaths from poor care, deeply troubled him. Well-liked by the regents who encouraged him to remain president, nonetheless, Hutchins retired in 1920.

== Michigan during the Roaring Twenties, 1920 to 1929 ==
The 1920s at the university were marked by the brief tenures of two presidents, Marion LeRoy Burton and Clarence Cook Little. In 1920, when Burton assumed office, a conference on higher education took place at the university, resulting in the establishment of the Association of Governing Boards of Universities and Colleges. Under his leadership, construction boomed on campus, and enrollments increased, propelled by the prosperous economy of the Roaring Twenties. He initiated the annual honors convocation, introduced the deans' conference, and increased university income. Burton's tenure also saw the advent of major field research initiatives in Africa, South America, the South Pacific, and the Middle East.

Burton fell ill in 1924 and died in 1925. In this emergency, President Emeritus Hutchins was called by the regents to assist, with Alfred Henry Lloyd serving as acting president until Little's arrival. Clarence Cook Little was elected president in 1925, advocating for individualized education and reforming curricula, particularly for women. Little proposed a curriculum division after two years to address knowledge gaps, leading to the University College proposal, which was ultimately abandoned after his resignation in 1929. Little was seen as a highly divisive figure who, among other things, offended Roman Catholics with his outspoken endorsements of contraception.

The Roaring Twenties saw the reorganization of the College of Engineering and the formation of an advisory committee of industrialists to guide academic research initiatives.

=== Michigan Divinity School ===
The proposal for establishing a nonsectarian divinity school on campus came after strong advocacy from Charles Foster Kent and received unanimous backing from nearby churches. The school was short-lived and was quietly shelved in 1927. Burton fell ill in 1924 and died in 1925.

== Michigan under Alexander Grant Ruthven, 1930 to 1949 ==
Following Little's resignation, Alexander Grant Ruthven, an alumnus, was elected president by unanimous vote. He would lead the university through the Great Depression and World War II.

=== The Deans’ university ===
Under Ruthven's leadership, the university administration became more decentralized with the creation of the university council, various divisions, and a system of committees. The decentralized nature of the university earned it the nickname "The Deans' University".

=== Theoretical Research ===
Michigan Symposium in Theoretical Physics, 1928 to 1941

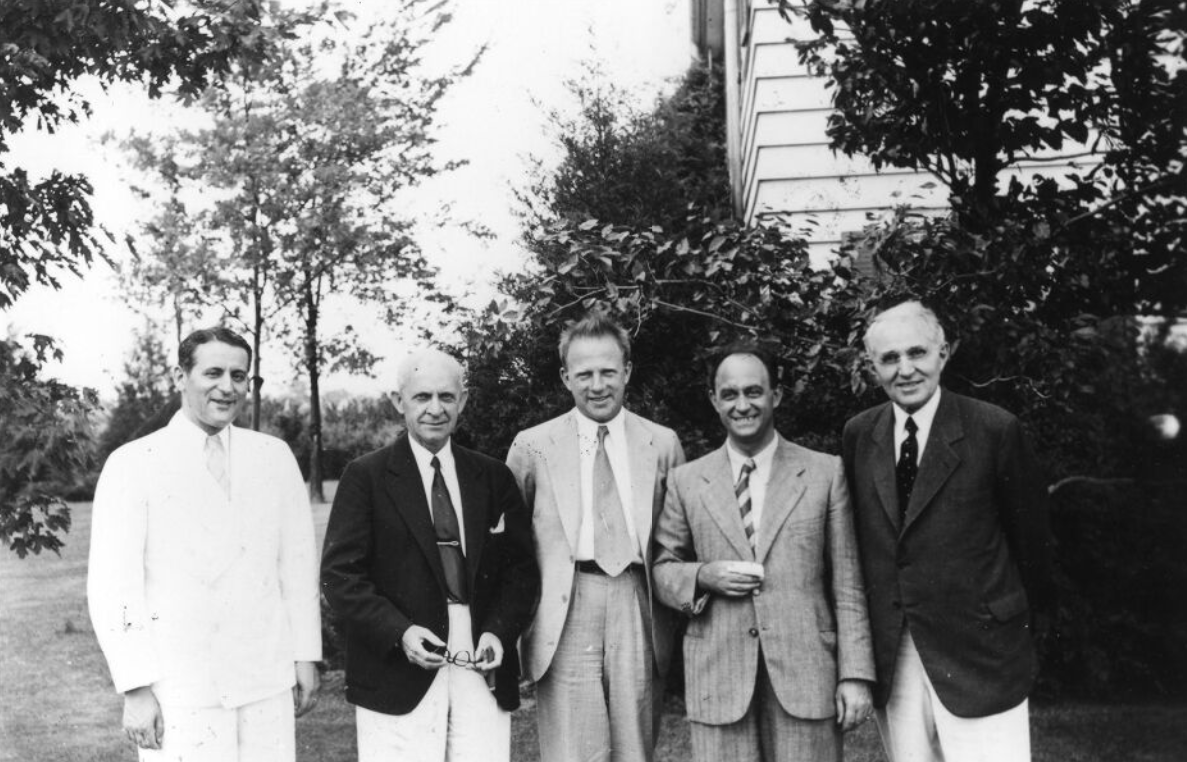
Samuel Goudsmit, Clarence Yoakum, Werner Heisenberg, Enrico Fermi, and Edward H. Kraus attending the symposium

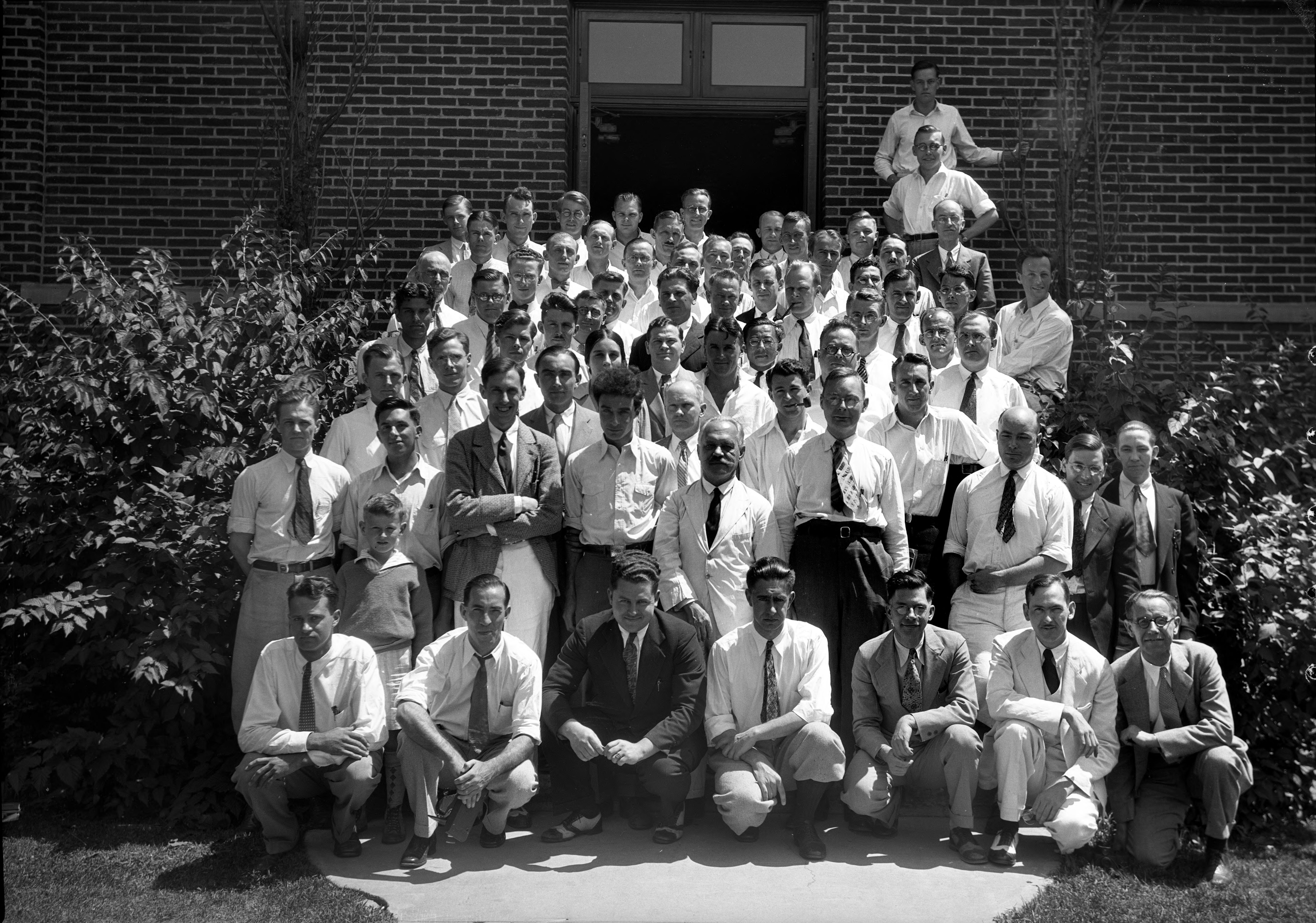
H.A. Kramers, second row, sixth left with J. Robert Oppenheimer, second row, fourth left, in a photograph of the symposium

For years, the university was a backwater in theoretical physics. Nonetheless, this changed under department head Harrison McAllister Randall, who brought theorists Oskar Klein, George Uhlenbeck and Samuel Goudsmit onto the faculty. Goudsmit mentored famous students at the university, including Robert Bacher and Wu Ta-You, the Father of Chinese Physics, who in turn taught Zhu Guangya and two Nobel laureates, Chen Ning Yang and Tsung-Dao Lee. Wolfgang Pauli held a visiting professorship at the university in 1931. Stephen Timoshenko created the first U.S. bachelor's and doctoral programs in engineering mechanics when he was a faculty professor at the university.

From 1928 to 1941, the Summer Symposium in Theoretical Physics featured renowned physicists like Niels Bohr, Werner Heisenberg, Paul Dirac, and Erwin Schrödinger, with at least fifteen attendees being Nobel laureates or future laureates.

In 1948, shortly after World War II, the Michigan Memorial Phoenix Project was established to honor the hundreds of lives lost from the university during the war. Funded by numerous contributors, including the Ford Motor Company, the Phoenix Project operated the Ford Nuclear Reactor, which established the nation's first academic program in nuclear science and engineering.

Apart from theoretical research, the university also contributed to the development of the VT fuze, depth bombs, the PT boat, and radar jammers. In 1948, Michigan's Institute for Social Research (ISR) was established by Rensis Likert.

=== Student life ===
The 1930s saw a major crackdown on the consumption of alcohol and the rowdiness that had characterized student life practically from inception. In February 1931, local police raided five fraternities, finding liquor and arresting 79 students, including the captain of the football team and Michigan Daily editors. During the Great Depression, ritual and widespread freshman hazing all but ceased. Long known as a "dressy campus," student attire became less formal. Fraternities and sororities became less prominent in student life, as their finances and memberships went into steep decline.

== 1950 to present ==
=== Campus activism and the debut of teach-in ===
An enduring legacy of the 1960s was the sharp rise in campus activism. Political dissent, largely subdued by campus consensus during World War II, returned to the university with a vengeance during the Civil Rights Movement and the Vietnam War.

This first teach-in was organized by faculty and Students for a Democratic Society at the university on March 24, 1965. The event was attended by about 3,500 people and consisted of debates, lectures, movies, and musical events aimed at protesting the war. Notable faculty participants included Anatol Rapoport and Charles Tilly. Throughout the teach-in, tensions were evident, as bomb threats were reported, and members of the Young Republicans organization picketed the event. The event ended the next morning, concluding with a 600-person rally.

In 1966, a series of sit-ins organized by Voice, the campus political party of Students for a Democratic Society, prompted the university administration to ban sit-ins on campus. This decision, in turn, led 1,500 students to conduct a one-hour sit-in in the administration building. Radicals adopted increasingly confrontational tactics, including an incident in which members of the Jesse James Gang, an SDS offshoot, locked themselves in a room with an on-campus military recruiter and refused to release him.

In March 1970, the Black Action Movement, an umbrella term for a coalition of student groups, sponsored a campus-wide strike to protest low minority enrollment and to build support for an African American Studies department. The strike included picket lines that prevented entry to university buildings and was widely observed by students and faculty. Eight days after the strike began, the university granted many of the coalition's demands.

The university's student government fell one vote short of approving a marijuana co-op based on the premise of high-quantity purchases and free distribution. Such attitudes persist in the Hash Bash, a rally and festival calling for the legalization of marijuana use, held annually on and near campus.

Throughout the 1960s and 1970s, campus unrest began to diminish the university's academic standing, which had been ranked among the top five in the nation. That standing started to decline during Fleming's tenure. Campus unrest persisted during Harold Tafler Shapiro's presidency, which began in 1980, fueled by controversies surrounding the university's national defense initiatives and foreign investments.

=== Affirmative action ===
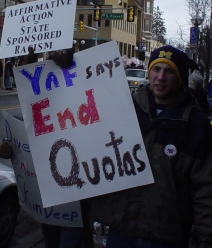
Members of the University of Michigan's Young Americans for Freedom (YAF) Chapter rally against affirmative action policies

In 1963, a controversial set of admissions practices collectively known as "affirmative action" was introduced. It was a radical measure originated by Hobart Taylor Jr., aimed at boosting Black student enrollment at elite universities. In 2003, two lawsuits involving the university's affirmative action admissions policy reached the U.S. Supreme Court (Grutter v. Bollinger and Gratz v. Bollinger). U.S. President George W. Bush took the unusual step of publicly opposing the policy before the court issued a ruling, though the eventual ruling was mixed. In the first case, the court upheld the Law School's admissions policy, while in the second, it ruled against the university's undergraduate admissions policy. In November 2006, Michigan voters passed proposal 2, which banned most affirmative action in university admissions. Under this law, race, gender, and national origin can no longer be considered in admissions.

=== Labor relations ===
In the 1960s, President Harlan Hatcher controversially dismissed three professors for their refusal to cooperate with Joseph McCarthy's House Un-American Activities Committee during his tenure, under pressure from Kit Clardy and his subcommittee.

The university administration continued to face labor disputes with labor unions during the 1990s, notably with the university's Lecturers' Employees Organization (LEO) and the Graduate Employees Organization (GEO), which represents graduate student employees.

In 1986, the university launched M-CARE, a managed care health plan that provided HMO coverage and other plans to university faculty and staff, retirees, dependents, and employers in the community. In late 2006, as the climate for health plans was changing rapidly throughout the region and the U.S., the university decided to sell M-CARE to Blue Cross Blue Shield of Michigan and its Blue Care Network subsidiary. As part of the sale, a new health care quality organization called Michigan HealthQuarters was founded.

As of 2026, the university reported an overall average faculty salary of $149,600, with compensation varying by academic rank: full professors earned an average of $206,800, associate professors $139,700, assistant professors $119,100, lecturers $91,900, and instructors $68,900. In terms of faculty composition, 52.3% of the faculty members are tenured, 15.0% are on the tenure track, and 32.8% hold non-tenure-track positions.

=== Governance and autonomous status ===
The tension between university autonomy and state control originated in the 19th century. Prior to the ratification of the Michigan State Constitution of 1850, the state legislature frequently intervened in campus operations, which induced chronic administrative instability. To remedy this, the 1850 constitution established an elected board of regents, thereby investing the university with the unique legal status of a constitutional corporation of independent authority and shielding it from legislative overreach. As the Michigan Supreme Court stated:

The board of regents and the legislature derive their power from the same supreme authority, namely, the constitution... They are separate and distinct constitutional bodies, with the power of the regents defined. By no rule of construction can it be held that either can encroach upon or exercise the powers conferred upon the other.

Despite this constitutional independence, the state legislature has historically sought to circumvent university autonomy through operational mandates and targeted funding restrictions. The Michigan Supreme Court has consistently defended the university's independence across several landmark rulings. These include the homeopathic cases People v. Regents (1856) and Sterling v. Regents (1896) concerning curriculum and faculty appointments, as well as Weinberg v. Regents (1893) concerning property control. In the 1970s, the ruling in Regents of the University of Michigan v. State (1975) invalidated conditional funding provisions. Subsequent litigation regarding the Open Meetings Act affirmed that statutory transparency measures cannot infringe upon core educational functions or divest the regents of their presidential appointment authority. This friction persists in 2026. Backed by a bipartisan joint endorsement from Democratic Governor Gretchen Whitmer, former Democratic Governor James J. Blanchard, and former Republican Governor John Engler, the legislature introduced House Joint Resolution U to replace the elected board with gubernatorial appointees. Furthermore, lawmakers advanced an appropriations bill that was spearheaded by House Speaker Matt Hall and Committee Chair Ann Bollin to propose major funding cuts to the university.

This perpetual fiscal and legislative discord, combined with a shrinking percentage of state financial support, led various lawmakers and advocacy groups in the 2000s to push for the university's privatization. Their anxiety stemmed from the threat of state intervention in university operations. Proponents hoped that completely severing state ties would eliminate future political impediments and end the longstanding jurisdictional conflict.
