= Robben Wright Fleming =

American lawyer and professor

9th President of the University of Michigan
- In office 1968–1979
- Preceded by: Harlan Hatcher
- Succeeded by: Harold Tafler Shapiro

Chancellor of the University of Wisconsin-Madison
- In office 1964–1967
- Preceded by: Fred Harvey Harrington
- Succeeded by: William H. Sewell

Interim President of the University of Michigan
- In office 1988–1988
- Preceded by: Harold Tafler Shapiro
- Succeeded by: James J. Duderstadt

Personal details
- Born: December 18, 1916 Paw Paw, Illinois, U.S.
- Died: January 11, 2010 (aged 93) Ann Arbor, Michigan, U.S.
- Education: Beloit College (B.A. 1938); University of Wisconsin Law School (LL.B. 1941)

Robben Wright Fleming (December 18, 1916 – January 11, 2010), also known in his youth as Robben Wheeler Fleming, was an American lawyer, legal scholar, and academic administrator.

Fleming was born in Paw Paw, Illinois, in 1916, he studied at Beloit College and later received his legal education at the University of Wisconsin Law School. During World War II, Fleming served as a U.S. Army lawyer specializing in labor negotiation and labor arbitration.

Fleming later transitioned into academic leadership, serving as chancellor of the University of Wisconsin–Madison (1964–1967) before becoming president of the University of Michigan (1968–1979). During a decade marked by the Civil rights movement and protests against the Vietnam War, he was credited with leading the institution through significant campus unrest. He returned as Michigan's interim president in 1988 and also served as president of the Corporation for Public Broadcasting. He died in Ann Arbor, Michigan, in 2010 at age 93.

== Early life and education ==
Robben Wright Fleming was born in Paw Paw, Illinois, on December 18, 1916, to Edmund P. Fleming and Emily Jeannette Wheeler. He was of Scottish descent on his father's side, while his mother's Dutch ancestors had come to the U.S. in 1652. His brother Teddy contracted spinal meningitis in 1926, and died after a two-week illness. To remember his brother, Fleming began using Teddy's middle name—Wheeler—as his own middle name, and did so until the Army made him revert to his legal name; his own first name was a concatenation of his uncle Robert's and grandfather Beniah's names. His father ran a general store and an indoor recreational facility, but the businesses fell apart during the Great Depression and his father died in 1933 of tuberculosis, leaving the family with no income, so his mother took a job in a one-room school house outside of town.

In high school, Fleming participated in forensics and drama and also played sports, principally basketball and baseball. He graduated as valedictorian and received a scholarship to Beloit College, where he enrolled in 1934. After graduating in 1938, he chose to go to the University of Wisconsin Law School in Madison. Fleming received his law degree and was admitted to both the Wisconsin and federal bars in June 1941. He had already secured a job offer from the Securities and Exchange Commission (SEC), though he was aware he was likely to be called up in the draft in the near future due to the increasing likelihood of war.

=== Family ===
Fleming met Aldyth Louise "Sally" Quixley, a fellow student from Rockford, Illinois, in 1935, when they were both working in the dining hall at Beloit College, and they dated seriously his final two years of school. She worked a variety of jobs in Illinois while he was at law school and joined him in Washington, D.C., after he started his job with the SEC. He proposed to her in Lafayette Square over Christmas 1941, and they were married by Rev. Peter Marshall at New York Avenue Presbyterian Church on April 3, 1942. The Flemings had two daughters, Nancy Jo and Carolyn Elizabeth, and one son, James Edmund.

== Government, military, and early academic career ==
Fleming began his work in the corporate reorganizations division of the SEC in June 1941. He found the work uninteresting and came to believe managers were hiring more attorneys than the workload required simply to avoid losing the positions. After President Franklin D. Roosevelt re-established the National War Labor Board, Fleming used his connections with two University of Wisconsin law faculty members who were involved with its formation to secure a junior position with the organization, beginning in April 1942. He served as a panel assistant whose initial duties involved assisting mediators trying to settle disputes between labor unions and employers, but due to personnel shortages he and other junior staff members were soon assigned to travel and attempt to mediate disputes themselves. His first such assignment was to mediate a dispute between the United Auto Workers and the Machinists Union, which were both trying to organize a Wright Aeronautical factory in Connecticut.

=== World War II ===
Fleming's draft number came up and in August 1942 he received his induction orders, which sent him to Fort Riley, Kansas, through December for basic training, and then to Fort Custer, Michigan, for three months of Officer Candidate School. He boarded a ship for Algiers on August 27, 1943, arriving there on September 17, and after a detour to Bizerte, Tunisia, he arrived for duty in Tizi Ouzou, Algeria, where he was posted until December, when he was sent to Naples, Italy. In March 1944, he was sent to Gourock, Scotland, then Shrivenham and Eastbourne in England, to await the invasion of Normandy. Following the liberation of Paris in August 1944, he was sent to France, then Belgium, where he remained until the end of the year.

In January 1945 his team of civil affairs officers attached to the Ninth Army went to Stolberg, Germany, which had been a city of 30,000 people, of whom only about 10,000 remained. Fleming was responsible for legal services, public health, and supplying labor for restoring bridges and public utilities. He approached the latter problem by offering a free lunch for volunteer laborers. Many of the legal situations he dealt with involved the military's non-fraternization policy designed to keep Americans from interacting with German citizens. He was transferred to Supreme Headquarters Allied Expeditionary Force at Versailles in February, the work of a friend who thought Fleming would find the work at headquarters more interesting. But Fleming asked to be transferred back to his unit in Germany and returned there in March.

Upon his return to Germany, Fleming served as defense counsel to a pair of sixteen-year-old boys in the Hitler Youth who had been caught spying behind American lines; he lost at trial, an appeal was rejected, and the boys were shot. After the war ended, his unit traveled south and he visited the recently liberated Dachau concentration camp; he later recounted the visit in his autobiography and wrote, "Nothing angers me more today than the bigoted scoundrels who would have a new generation ... believe that all of this never happened. Those of us who know ... because we were there have an obligation to speak out." He was ordered home in November 1945 and discharged from the army as a captain on December 16.

=== Academic life ===
Fleming took a job with the newly created Veterans Emergency Housing Program, under the direction of Wilson Wyatt. He had hopes that working for the rising Democratic star would make for an exciting place to work, but the agency never got off the ground, and he began looking for other work. Around the same time, the University of Wisconsin offered him a position as assistant professor and director of a new Industrial Relations Center; he accepted the offer and worked there from 1947 to 1952. He returned to Washington from April to September 1950 to serve as executive director of a wage control board President Harry Truman had created at the onset of the Korean War, and during this time he also began to work as an arbitrator. Fleming later served as president of the National Academy of Arbitrators from 1966 to 1967, and was a charter member of the organization at its founding in 1947.

Although he was recommended for promotion at Wisconsin, he felt unsure of the prospect for tenure while in his role at the center. When the University of Illinois offered a position as a full professor and director of the Institute of Labor and Industrial Relations, he accepted, effective September 1952. In 1957 he became a professor of law and continued to have time off to perform arbitration work, and in 1963, the president of the University of Wisconsin system called to offer him a new position. The Wisconsin system was being reorganized with a provost at each campus under the overall direction of the president, Fred Harrington, and Harrington wanted Fleming for the position in Madison; Fleming accepted, effective September 1964.

=== Chancellor of University of Wisconsin–Madison (1964–1967) ===
At their January 10, 1964, meeting, the board of regents of the University of Wisconsin named Fleming a professor of law and provost of the Madison campus, effective that September 1. A few months into his tenure, the regents revived the century-old title of chancellor for Fleming. The University of Wisconsin system was expanding rapidly at this time, and part of Fleming's job was ensuring that the Madison campus, which generated most of the revenue, kept an appropriate share of money for its own needs. The first significant student protests against the Vietnam War took place during Fleming's tenure, and his handling of these is the most notable aspect of his administration.

In May 1966, Students for a Democratic Society organized an anti-draft sit-in in a campus building. Rather than forcibly eject the protestors, Fleming allowed them to occupy the building for five days provided they remained peaceful, and he allowed their representatives to address a faculty meeting on the topic. His restraint was widely praised at the time, with the Milwaukee Journal saying the university had "shown the nation that a student protest can be a legitimate exercise in democracy, not a disruptive episode in bitterness". Protest leaders viewed the sit-in as a failure because the university continued to cooperate with the Selective Service Administration.

On February 22, 1967, police arrested seventeen protestors who refused to leave an engineering building at the end of a sit-in protesting Dow Chemical's on-campus recruiting. Fleming personally paid $1,155 in bail (equivalent to $11,152 in 2025) for eleven of them who did not have money to pay their own, an action which drew criticism for being too lenient. He later explained that he did not want the students to become martyrs by remaining in jail during a student rally planned for that evening, and he was confident that if they were present in person, he could make a more persuasive argument than they could. The plan worked, and the protest was muted; students began to call Fleming the "Silver Fox" because they felt he was outwitting them.

He also expanded university projects in Nigeria, France, Germany and Japan.

== President of the University of Michigan (1968–1979) ==
After President Harlan Hatcher announced his retirement from the University of Michigan, the board of regents formed a presidential selection committee assisted by three advisory committees representing students, faculty, and alumni. The student panel voiced concerns related to campus diversity, the university's role in the military draft, and classified research programs with military applications; they also demanded an increased voice in decision-making and respect from the new president. Roger Heyns, then serving as chancellor of the University of California–Berkeley, was the early front-runner for the position. Regents Robert Briggs and Albert Bentley traveled to California in January 1967 to meet with him, but came away unimpressed with his demeanor in the wake of Governor Ronald Reagan's just-announced firing of University of California president Clark Kerr.

Fleming was one of four or five candidates on the regents' shortlist, and after a member of the University of Minnesota's presidential search committee leaked news that the school had already made an offer to Fleming to fill its own open position, Michigan quickly invited him to meet with the advisory committees before the end of March. Following a meeting at Detroit's Hotel Ponchartrain that was almost entirely occupied by discussion of how to handle student protests, Briggs offered Fleming the position while driving him to the airport. Fleming accepted, later saying the choice between Michigan and Minnesota was difficult, but was decided by Michigan's academic reputation, his and Sally's preference to live in a smaller city, and a desire not to move further north to even colder weather than Madison's.

=== Handling early campus protests ===
The regents created the position of president-designate for Fleming beginning in September 1967, in order to give him four months of planning and orientation before he assumed his full duties on January 1. A student protest that October which disrupted a meeting between engineering faculty and Rear Admiral Samuel Brown demonstrated to the community the differing approaches of the outgoing and incoming administrations. The dean of the College of Engineering asked the Hatcher administration to impose disciplinary measures, and vice president for student affairs Richard Cutler in turn asked the College of Literature, Science, and the Arts to expel one of protestors, Karen Daenzer; the school refused to do so, but the attempt turned her into a cause célèbre on campus. In his own response to the incident, Fleming emphasized its positive aspects, pointing out that all parties acted with restraint, there was no violence, and the police were not involved; at the same time, he called for increased student participation in decision-making. As at Wisconsin, protest leaders at Michigan realized that Fleming's softer approach would make it more difficult to generate opposition to his administration—one, Robert Meeropol, wrote, "Hatcher was a great president to work against, because he ... did things that got other people more sympathetic with you, as opposed to Fleming ... We all knew Fleming's coming was a bad thing."

Shortly after Fleming took over officially in January 1968, he removed Cutler as vice president for student affairs; Cutler's earlier writings had expressed support for free expression on campus, but his actions in office, including an attempt to ban sit-ins in 1966 and his cooperation in providing the names of "subversives" to the House Un-American Activities Committee, did not fit into Fleming's philosophy of a restrained and dignified atmosphere of debate. Fleming left the post vacant until 1970, effectively keeping responsibility for student affairs for himself.

In his inaugural speech in March 1968, Fleming drew a distinction between the behavior of student protestors and the message they were attempting to convey:

It is often easier for critics of the present generation of students to fulminate against their bad manners, which are frequently displayed, than to accept the fact that underlying the bad manners may be a dedication to human well-being not found in their critics.

The following month, on the morning of the funeral of Martin Luther King Jr., over one hundred African-American students locked themselves in the administration building in a protest over campus diversity. Fleming was the only administrator they allowed to enter the building, and he negotiated a peaceful end to the occupation that afternoon after promising further discussions, which eventually led to the creation of a scholarship fund in King's name and the creation of the Center of Afroamerican and African Studies in 1970. Afterwards, Fleming said of the students' demands, "We're interested in what they're interested in; we're not really at odds," and said he felt the timing was appropriate "in this period of terrible emotional stress following the insane assassination of Dr. King". He also defended their behavior, saying, "These kids have not been hostile. We've had this terrible, terrible tragedy. You can't expect the normal rules to apply." A similar building occupation later that month at Columbia University was resolved through police intervention that left hundreds of students and faculty members injured.

In dealing with campus protests, Fleming favored a strategy of not letting minor differences become major incidents that would in turn serve as recruitment material for demonstrators. When an anti-war group's plan to dig a "bomb crater" on the Diag, the main campus square, raised concerns over damage to plumbing and wiring, Fleming found them a safe site to dig it and explained, "Why not let them dig one? Everybody else is digging holes for new buildings ... It's not a big job to throw the dirt back in the hole ..." Fleming himself described the Vietnam War as a "colossal mistake" at a teach-in September 1969 and called for the unilateral withdrawal of U.S. forces. This led Vice President Spiro Agnew to call him "gutless", though Fleming wrote that Agnew was "immensely unpopular with both students and faculty and nothing could have helped me more than his remarks".

=== The threat of violence ===
Fleming viewed vandalism and destruction of property as behavior he could not tolerate, threatening to delist Students for a Democratic Society (SDS) as an approved student organization if it did not reimburse the university for damages caused at an SDS-sponsored sit-in in November 1968. Recognizing that escalating protests nationwide might lead to more serious incidents in the future, in May 1969 he sought assurances that the police would cooperate with his strategy to avoid violence in the event buildings needed to be cleared of protestors; he proposed that he would always enter the building himself, that any police accompanying him would always be unarmed, that arrests would only be made if he deemed necessary, and that the police would retreat in the face of resistance rather than respond with force. Ann Arbor's chief of police, Walter Krasny, broadly agreed with Fleming's flexible approach, later writing:

Somebody's going to come out on the short end if you don't have some passive type of resistance. We used that type of approach more than the mass attempt to move people, which I was criticized for and President Fleming was criticized for because everybody assumed that when somebody took over a building, you just went in there and threw them out. ... A lot of people criticized President Fleming because he'd say, "Well, glass is cheap. We can always replace glass in the building." Well, the taxpayer is saying, "What the hell are you talking about? That's our property they're destroying out there and you're saying that it's cheap." Then Kent State came along. And that was something that every police administrator knew was going to happen sometime and kept saying, "Oh my God, I hope it doesn't happen in my town."

A bomb placed under an Army staff car parked outside the campus ROTC offices in June 1969 caused damage but no injuries. Later that month, two nights of impromptu partying that blocked off South University Street near the president's house was met with teargas fired by sheriff's deputies. Sources differ on what happened next. In his autobiography, Fleming says students came to his house with teargas in their eyes, which he let them into the kitchen to wash out, after which he went out and persuaded the deputy chief of police to withdraw, saying the sheriff, Douglas Harvey, had been "itching for a confrontation" and reacted beyond what was necessary. Newspaper accounts say Fleming became angry with the police and Harvey was dismissive of his concerns, while the city police agreed to a fifteen-minute delay to allow the crowd to disperse, but when a deputy was hit by a thrown rock, the police charged the crowd and used tear gas and pepper spray to clear the street.

Details that emerged afterwards confirmed Fleming's view that university students were not responsible for the violence. The press treated the affair as a conflict between the president and the sheriff, treating Fleming as a hero; the Detroit Free Press wrote in an editorial, "Mr. Fleming has had far more experience, with far greater success, in handling these affairs than has Harvey. ... Mr. Fleming kept his campus calm. Now his best-laid plans have been undermined by one dumb cop."

=== Black Action Movement ===
In February 1970, a coalition of students called the Black Action Movement (BAM) presented Fleming with a list of demands that included a minimum of 10% Black students by the 1973–1974 school year, the hiring of full-time recruiters to promote Black enrollment, a Black student center, and a variety of modifications to the financial aid program. Fleming delivered the administration's response to BAM in March, hoping to open negotiations, but BAM leaders found some of the wording offensive, particularly a passage about admissions criteria that concluded, "We do not know how much further deviation we can make in the criteria and still accomplish anything. At some point it is clear that the student is far better off to enter a college where the competition is less severe and where the course options are less academically oriented." Faculty member and BAM supporter Madison Foster wrote of Fleming's response, "I don't know if Fleming drafted the letter, but he certainly signed it. ... We'll catch him in his color, symbolically, and jam him to the wall. He will not talk to us like that."

Fleming and the administration resisted committing to a 10% enrollment target, citing uncertainty over how to fund the effort. The regents approved a compromise in March that called the 10% number a "goal"; BAM called the proposal "repugnant" and called for a campus strike. White supporters of BAM disrupted an honors convocation and attempted to block access to classrooms before BAM leaders told them to stop and take no further actions unless Black student leaders instructed. BAM protestors picketed outside buildings, addressed classes, and engaged in protest actions such as blocking intersections and stopping drivers entering parking garages to discuss the strike's demands. Minor property damage and shoving matches also occurred. Bomb threats were made, although BAM leadership had ruled out such actions.

Fleming reiterated that 10% Black enrollment remained a "goal" but that there was no guarantee of funds being available to achieve it, and said getting any further concessions would be "nearly impossible". On March 25, the faculty senate adopted a resolution calling for individual schools and colleges to adopt budget cuts to secure the funds to achieve the 10% goal, which allowed Fleming to announce that the funds had been secured on March 27. Further negotiation between Fleming and BAM leader Ed Fabre resulted in an agreement; BAM leaders organized a celebration, and the board of regents issued a statement that praised both the Black students and Fleming while directing a barb at other protestors:

... the public should take note that the black students have, unlike many of the white radicals who seem bent on destruction for its own sake, been pursuing the legitimate objective of trying to make more educational opportunities available for their people. ... During a difficult situation President Fleming has acted with great patience in carrying out the policy adopted by the Regents and the schools and colleges. He has our complete confidence.

Vice President Agnew accused Fleming of "surrender" to militants for agreeing to the 10% goal, and the Muskegon Chronicle said the university was discriminating in favor of Black students and using a quota system to admit unqualified students. Fleming categorically denied the existence of a quota, citing the fact that the university would, in fact, fall short of its 10% goal because it was only a goal and not a quota. He later said the admissions department told him the agreement was generating a higher quality of applicants rather than lower, and he felt such policies "enrich rather than erode the quality of education".

=== University administration ===
By 1971, the campus unrest had largely dissipated, and other matters came to occupy Fleming's administration. One was finances, as cuts in public financing meant tuition and student fees made up a larger portion of revenues, from 25% in 1966–1967 to 33% in 1976–1977, leading him to worry that lower-income students would be unable to attend. In spite of budget concerns, Fleming was able to make some changes to the undergraduate program, adding a Residential College and securing legislative approval for turning the University of Michigan campuses at Dearborn and Flint into four-year institutions with independent chancellors, rather than branches that only offered upper-division courses in conjunction with local junior colleges. He also oversaw changes to the financing of the athletic department, so that it would be fully responsible for financing its operations, without support from the university's general fund.

His administration promoted two departments to full schools: the School of Information and Library Studies and the School of Art. He oversaw the introduction of affirmative action programs, a campus-wide restructuring of salaries and compensation to address gender inequalities, and the construction of several major campus buildings, including the Hatcher Graduate Library, the Bentley Historical Library, the Power Center for the Performing Arts, and a building for the schools of architecture and art.

In the fall of 1977, Fleming was approached with job offers to lead the State University of New York and the Center for the Study of Democratic Institutions in Santa Barbara, but declined. Charles J. Hitch, president of the University of California system, said Fleming was under consideration as his successor; a visit to California turned into a job interview, but a conversation with Governor Jerry Brown left him unconvinced of Brown's commitment to continuing California's existing system of higher education, and he informed the board he was not interested. Another offer, from the chairman of the board of the Corporation for Public Broadcasting, was more interesting to the Flemings, and he announced his resignation from Michigan effective in the new year of 1979. Allan F. Smith served as interim president until Harold T. Shapiro was selected as a permanent successor.

== Later career ==
Fleming and his wife spent two years in Washington, D.C., before returning to Ann Arbor permanently.

=== Corporation for Public Broadcasting ===
Fleming began his tenure as president of the Corporation for Public Broadcasting (CPB) in January 1979, and in his memoirs he described the public broadcasting system in the United States as a "badly organized entity" and a "nonsystem" that nonetheless did some good work. He lamented that there was "none of the discipline that made the British Broadcasting Corporation the model for excellence", because the system consisted of independent stations who would never agree to consistent programming or time schedules. Early in his tenure, he convinced the board to give up direct control over which programming CPB funded, in favor of a professionally run program fund.

His primary accomplishment was negotiating a $150 million grant from philanthropist Walter Annenberg for the purposes of educational programming. To rectify Annenberg's desire to participate in the programming with the requirements of tax laws and the reluctance of the CPB board to accept outside interference, he proposed the creation of an Annenberg Council, with members from CPB, NPR, PBS, the Annenbergs themselves, as well as two outside members. This became the Annenberg/CPB Project, with Fleming serving as its first director. The project was delayed following the election of Ronald Reagan who, despite being a close friend of Annenberg, wanted to eliminate the CPB; his own party in Congress turned out not to support such a move, so the project moved forward once its future was secure. Fleming's first project as director was to enlist former CBS News president Fred Friendly to produce a series of televised seminars on the Constitution. Historian Nat Hentoff called the Fred Friendly Seminars, which began with that 13-part series, The Constitution — That Delicate Balance, "the most valuable, quintessential American television I have ever seen".

Midway through his tenure at CPB, Fleming was diagnosed with a malignant lymphoma. He underwent chemotherapy and decided to retire by the end of 1981, when he would be 65, and made plans to return to Ann Arbor. He served as interim director of Annenberg/CPB on a part-time basis after returning to Michigan, until a permanent director was found.

=== Return to Michigan ===
Fleming returned to the University of Michigan as a professor of law until December 1985, when the regents named him professor emeritus and president emeritus. Fleming had taught one course each semester during his return, but found he was not teaching with the same "enthusiasm and skill" as he once had.

He served as the chairman of the board of the National Institute for Dispute Resolution for eight years following his departure from CPB. The institute, a joint venture of the Hewlett Foundation, Ford Foundation, and MacArthur Foundation, sought to promote the use of alternative means of dispute resolution rather than the courts. He also served as the chairman of the Educational Testing Service's advisory committee and spent eleven years on the board of the S.C. Johnson Foundation. From 1985 to 1990, he served as Michigan Governor James Blanchard's representative to a group trying, ultimately unsuccessfully, to reform the state's medical malpractice system.

The University of Michigan board of regents asked Fleming to serve as interim president for eight months in 1988, following the resignation of Harold T. Shapiro to take up the presidency of Princeton University. During this time, the administration tried to set up a process for adjudicating alleged cases of discrimination at the university, but lost a case brought by the ACLU in federal court that argued the system violated the First Amendment. His interim tenure ended with the appointment of James J. Duderstadt as president. In his later years, he served as an expert witness in several cases involving higher education, and in 1991 he served on a commission charged with setting the future direction for higher education in North Carolina.

== Legacy ==
Fleming died in Ann Arbor, on January 11, 2010.

He has been praised, especially by his former colleagues, for his restraint and tolerance for campus protests and student activism, particularly at the University of Michigan. Former University of Michigan president Mary Sue Coleman said he "will be remembered in the same breath as Henry Tappan and James Angell as one of the truly great presidents of the University of Michigan". At the ACLU's 50th Anniversary Dinner in 1970, the organization awarded Fleming a citation for "complete commitment to the protection and enlargement of civil liberties on the university campus", and said in awarding it that, "Perhaps more effectively than any other American educator he had defended the duty of the university to serve as the arena for the clash of ideologies and to do so not timidly but proudly."

The assessment of his behavior and legacy from those who participated in the protests themselves is mixed. Some agree with the popular description of him as a thoughtful and courteous interlocutor, among them Bill Ayers of SDS, who wrote, "He always wanted to know what you thought ... he was a pretty reasonable guy and I think he believed in the power of reason and the importance of evidence", Chicago Seven defendant Rennie Davis, who wrote, "His spirit to see humanity in any side is a legacy that will inspire us always", and Jim Toy of the Ann Arbor Gay Liberation Front, who wrote, "If he got riled, he continued to be polite."

Other contemporaries from the protest era have a negative assessment, such as former SDS members Eric Chester, who "found him to be a rigid personality, unwilling and unable to engage in a genuine give and take", and Gary Rothberger, who called Fleming a "cold dude who didn't care about anything else other than carrying out his assignment" and said of his passivity towards alleged police brutality during the South University riots, "He did nothing when he could have spoken out."

=== Commemoration ===
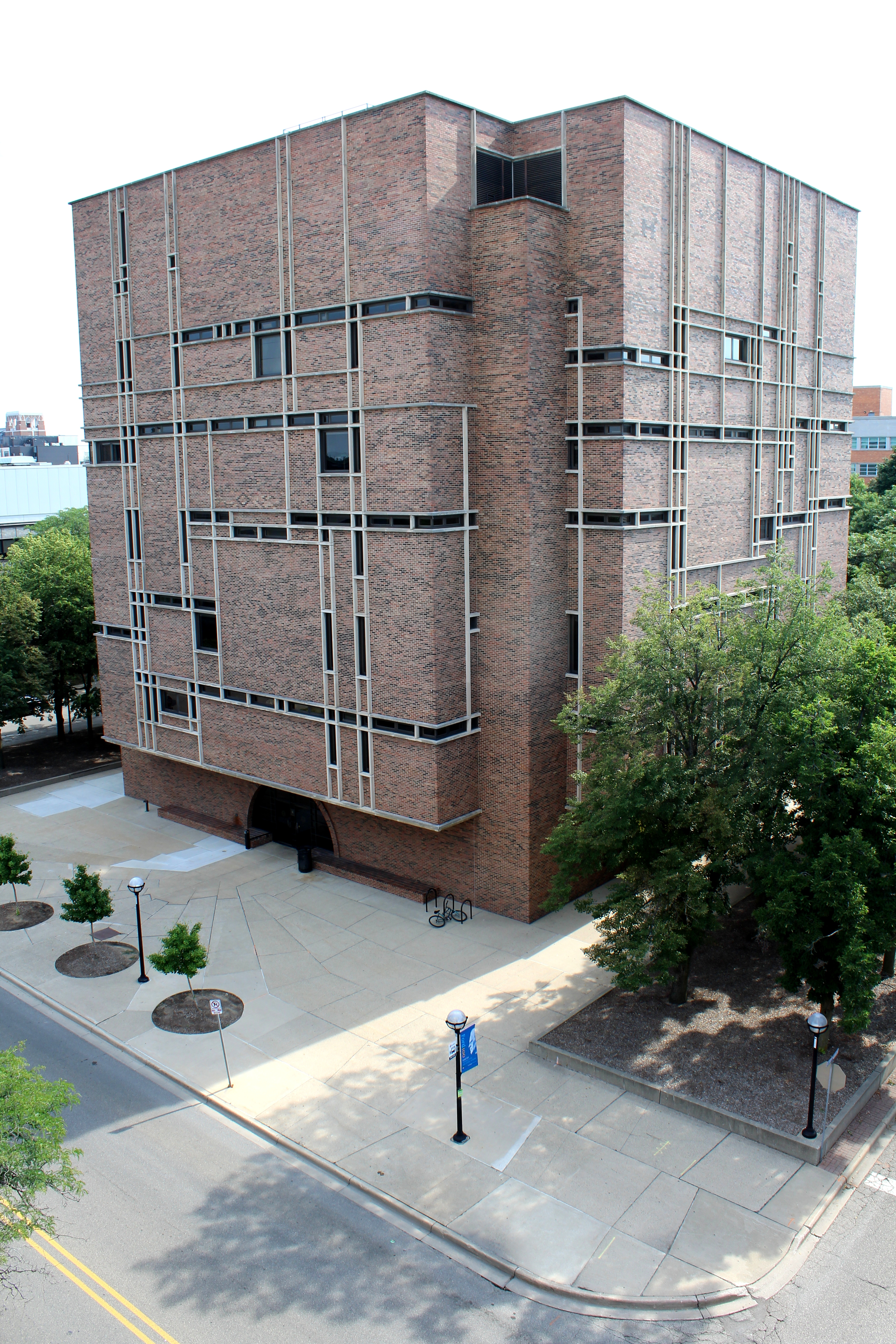
The Fleming Administration Building of the University of Michigan

The University of Michigan's central administration building, designed in 1964 by Michigan's architect laureate Alden Dow, is named the Robben W. & Aldyth Fleming Administration Building. The board of regents approved an infrastructure plan in 2016 that will result in the demolition of the Fleming Building, but university president Mark Schlissel said the school would find another way to continue commemorating Fleming, whom he called one of his personal heroes.

Demolition began in August, 2022. The building was considered functionally obsolescent.

== Books by Robben Fleming (Chronological Order) ==
- The Labor Arbitration Process (1965) (Illini Press). A foundational text on labor arbitration procedures and practices.
- The Politics of Human Nature (1971) ISBN 9781138537552 Explores the intersection of political theory and human behavior.
- The Uses of the University (1973, contributor) Fleming contributed to this influential series of lectures initiated by Clark Kerr.
- The University and National Defense (1974) Examines the role of universities in national defense and policy.
- Tempests into Rainbows: Managing Turmoil in Universities (1996) A reflective memoir on his experiences as president of the University of Michigan during the turbulent 1960s and 1970s.

== Bibliography ==
- Tempests into Rainbows: Managing Turbulence. Robben Wright Fleming, University of Michigan Press, 1996. ISBN 0-472-10674-0

Academic offices
Preceded by Fred Harvey Harrington	Chancellor of the University of Wisconsin–Madison; 1964–1968	Succeeded by William H. Sewell
Preceded by Harlan Hatcher	9th President of the University of Michigan; 1968–1979	Succeeded by Allan Frederick Smith (interim); Harold Tafler Shapiro
Preceded by Harold Tafler Shapiro	Interim President of the University of Michigan; 1988	Succeeded by James Duderstadt
