= James Duderstadt =

American university administrator (1942–2024)

James J. Duderstadt
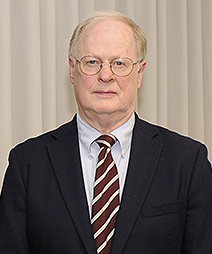
- Duderstadt in 2015

11th President of the University of Michigan
- In office 1988–1996
- Preceded by: Harold Tafler Shapiro
- Succeeded by: Lee Bollinger

Personal details
- Born: December 5, 1942 Fort Madison, Iowa, US
- Died: August 21, 2024 (aged 81) Ann Arbor, Michigan, US
- Education: Yale University (BA); California Institute of Technology (MS, PhD)
- Profession: Professor
- Scientific career
- Fields: Physics
- Thesis: The theory of neutron wave propagation (1968)

James Johnson Duderstadt (December 5, 1942 – August 21, 2024) was an American nuclear physicist and academic administrator. He served as the eleventh president of the University of Michigan from 1988 to 1996. as the sixth provost and vice president for academic affairs from 1986 to 1988, and as the tenth dean of the University of Michigan College of Engineering from 1981 to 1986.

Duderstadt was elected a member of the National Academy of Engineering in 1987 for significant contributions to nuclear science and engineering relating to fission and fusion energy systems and reactor theory and design.

On April 30, 2015, the National Science Board announced that James Duderstadt would receive its Vannevar Bush Award. Duderstadt was recognized for his leadership in science and technology and his substantial contributions to the welfare of the nation through public service activities in science, technology and public policy.

He held the title of president emeritus and University Professor of Science and Engineering at the University of Michigan.

== Biography ==
James Johnson Duderstadt was born on December 5, 1942, in Fort Madison, Iowa, and was raised in Carrollton, Missouri. He received a B.A. from Yale University in 1964, and an M.S. in 1965 and a PhD in 1968 from California Institute of Technology. At Caltech, he studied under nuclear physicist Noel Corngold.

In 1972, he worked for the NASA Lewis Research Center, then for the U.S. Army Missile Command from 1973 to 1975, and eventually for the Argonne National Laboratory from 1975 to 1979.

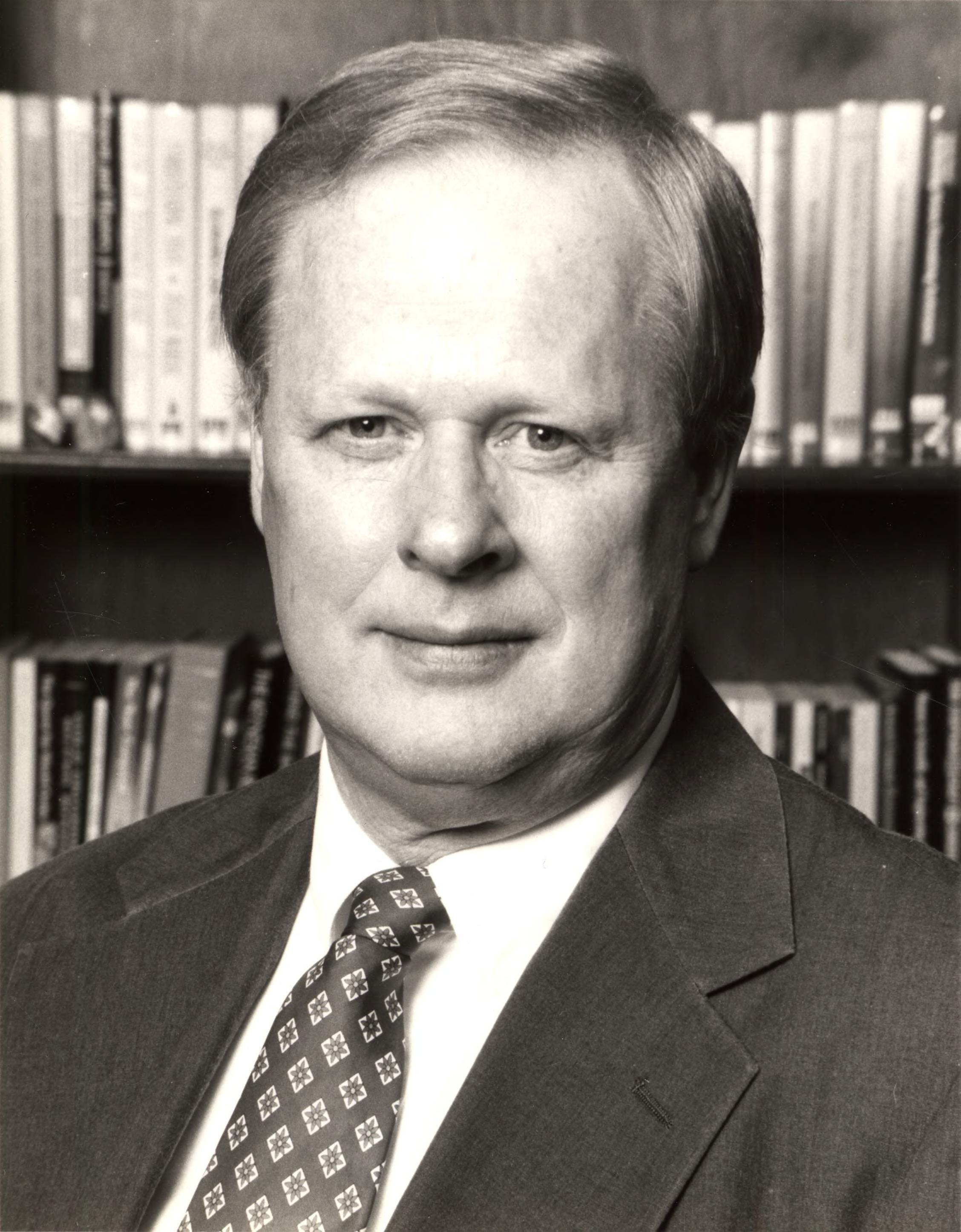
University of Michigan faculty portrait of Duderstadt in 1995

He worked as an assistant professor of nuclear engineering at the University of Michigan from 1969 to 1972, associate professor from 1972 to 1976, and full professor from 1976 to 1981.

In 1981, Duderstadt entered academic administration when he was appointed dean of the College of Engineering, the youngest dean in Engineering's history. From 1986 to 1988, he served as provost and vice president for academic affairs under president Shapiro. In 1988, he was appointed the eleventh president of the University of Michigan, up until 1996. He and his wife, Anne Lock-Duderstadt, lived in the university's President's House.

He served on the boards of National Science Foundation, the National Commission on the Future of Higher Education, the Nuclear Energy Research Advisory Committee of the Department of Energy, the Big Ten Athletic Conference, the University of Michigan Hospitals, Unisys, CMS Energy, and the Glion Colloquium, among others.

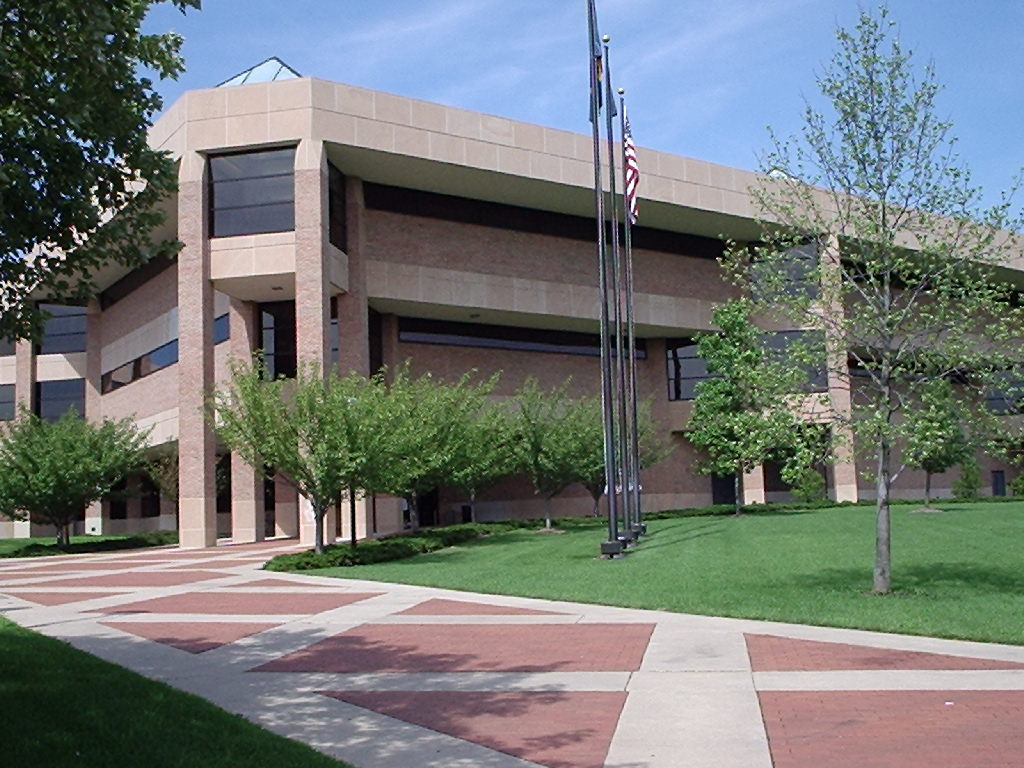
The Duderstadt Center

The main library on the University of Michigan's North Campus is named The James and Anne Duderstadt Center (commonly referred as "The Dude") in honor of Duderstadt and his wife, Anne ("Ma Dude"). Formerly called the Media Union, it houses the Art, Architecture & Engineering Library and also contains computer clusters, audio and video editing laboratories, galleries, and studios, as well as usability and various digital media laboratories, including virtual reality. The Millennium Project, which focuses on the future of the university learning environment and is where Duderstadt maintained an appointment as an emeritus professor, is also housed in the Duderstadt Center.

Duderstadt died in Ann Arbor on August 21, 2024, at the age of 81.

== Bibliography ==
- Nuclear Reactor Analysis, 1976 (with Louis J. Hamilton)
- Transport Theory, 1979 (with William R. Martin)
- Inertial Confinement Fusion, 1982 (with Gregory A. Moses)
- Solutions Manual to Principles of Engineering, 1990
- A University for the twenty-first Century, 2000
- Higher Education in the Digital Age: Technology Issues and Strategies for American Colleges and Universities, 2002
- Intercollegiate Athletics and the American University: A University President's Perspective, 2003
- The Future of the Public University in America: Beyond the Crossroads, 2004
- The View from the Helm: Leading the American University during an Era of Change, 2007

Academic offices
Preceded by Robben Wright Fleming (interim); Harold Tafler Shapiro	eleventh President of the University of Michigan; 1988–1996	Succeeded by Homer A. Neal (interim); Lee C. Bollinger
