= Robert P. Briggs =

American central banker

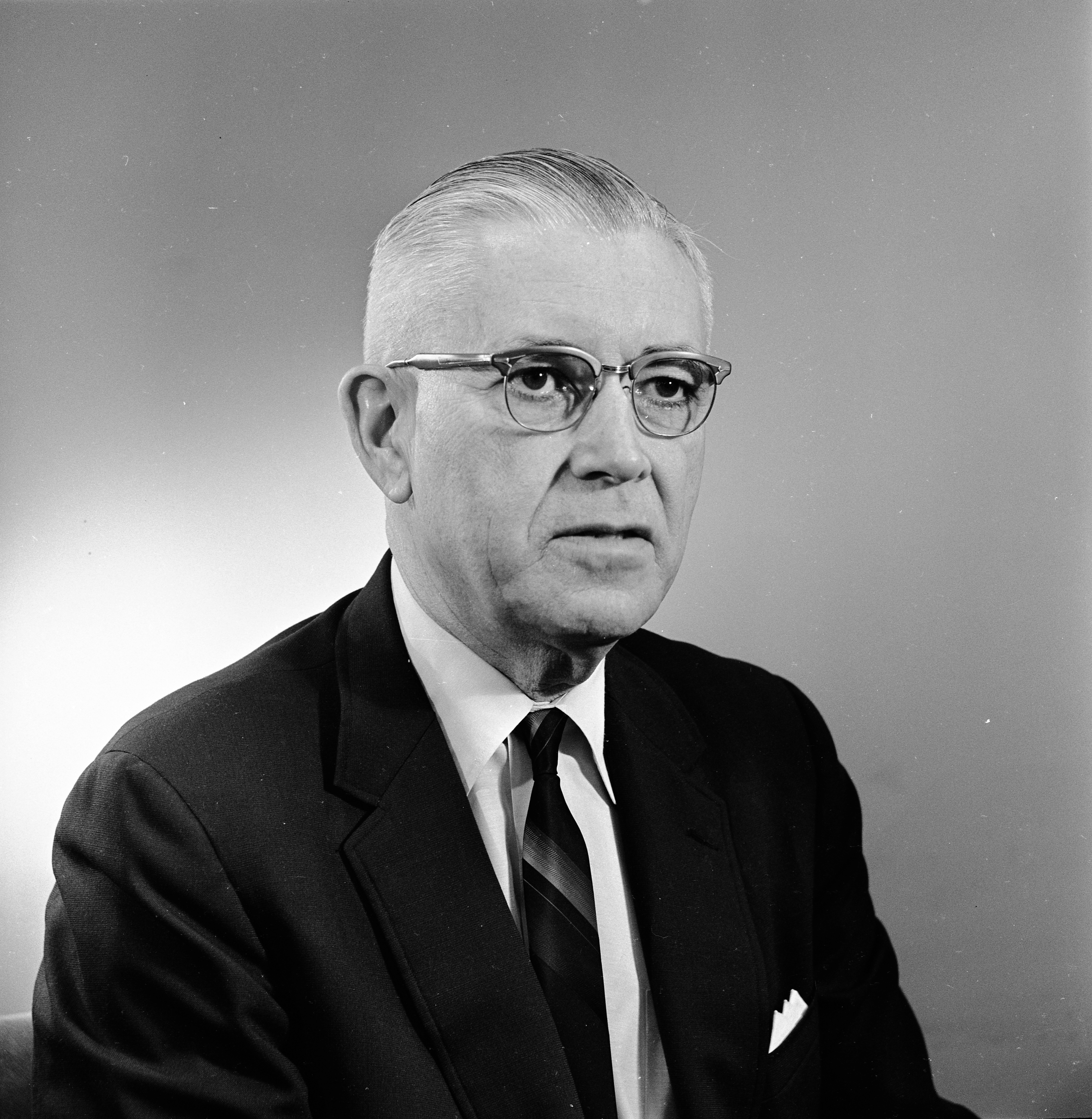

Vice President of University of Michigan

Personal details
- Born: April 4, 1903
- Died: September 2, 1998 (aged 95) Elk Lake, Michigan
- Spouse: Maxine Eloise Corliss
- Children: Ruth Briggs; Peter Briggs
- Parent(s): Robert Douglas Briggs and Rose Pierce Briggs
- Education: University of Michigan

Robert P. Briggs (April 3, 1903 – September 2, 1998) was chairman of the Federal Reserve Bank of Chicago board of directors, vice-president of finance of the University of Michigan, and executive vice-president of Consumer Power Company of Jackson, Michigan. A graduate of the University of Michigan, Briggs served as a professor in the University's School of Business Administration, first as an administrator, and eventually as a member of the Board of Regents. Briggs spent 17 years as an executive vice-president at the Consumer Power Company, where he led various committees and organizations within the state of Michigan. Some of these organizations included: the Michigan United Fund, the Michigan State Chamber of Commerce, the Michigan Traffic Safety Commission, and the Alumni Association of the University of Michigan. Dividend magazine, a publication by the University of Michigan's then School of Business Administration, described Briggs' career as having, "embraced both academic and business worlds, and his activities have covered an almost endless range of community and business affairs."

== Early life ==
Robert Peter Briggs was born on April 3, 1903, in Monroe, Michigan, to parents Robert Douglas Briggs and Rose Pierce Briggs. His father was a superintendent of the Monroe, Michigan schools. Starting in 1908, Robert attended Lansing Public Schools, and proceeded to work for the Lansing State Journal from 1911 to 1917 as a mail carrier. After graduating from Lansing public schools, Briggs enrolled as a student at the University of Michigan in Ann Arbor, Michigan, in the College of Literature, Science, and the Arts, where he also worked a number of jobs in order to pay food, housing, and tuition fees. He elected to attend the University of Michigan as opposed to the nearby Michigan State University because his eventual wife, Maxine Eloise Corliss, was attending Michigan State and thus he thought it would be a good idea if they attended different schools. Briggs struggled in his first semester at the University of Michigan, and was not allowed to return for the winter semester in 1921. He was allowed to re-enroll later in the University on academic probation. He has described his academic struggles during his first year as being, "a good learning experience," and would eventually work his way up to A's by graduation, enabling to graduate with a Bachelor of Arts degree from the University of Michigan's college of Literature, Science, and the Arts in 1925.

== Continuing education and teaching ==
After graduating from the University of Michigan, Briggs moved to Kansas to be a professor of business administration at Kansas Wesleyan University from 1925-1927. He was an acting dean at the university from 1926 to 1927. In 1927, Briggs was offered a position teaching economics at the University of Michigan's College of Literature, Science, and the Arts while also studying in the School of Business Administration, where he eventually graduated from with a Masters of Business Administration in 1928.

From 1927 to 1935, Briggs was an instructor of economics at the University of Michigan's College of the Literature, Science, and the Arts. In 1933, Briggs became a certified public accountant in Michigan. In 1935, Briggs returned to the University of Michigan as an assistant professor of economics and accounting, which he taught until 1940 before being promoted to associate professor of economics and accounting at the School of Business Administration, a position he held until 1945. Intermittently, from 1934 to 1938, he was also the fraternity financial advisor within the university. During World War II, Briggs was on leave from the University of Michigan as assistant to the president of Standard Steel Spring Company, which made essential war material.

== Vice president of the University of Michigan ==
In 1945, Briggs was named vice-president of business and finance at the University of Michigan, which put him in charge of purchasing, finance, collections, and investments. At the same time, the university was facing a significant problem: increasing enrollment because of soldiers returning from World War II who were interested in higher education. Briggs was tasked with expanding the facilities of the university in order to handle the increase in enrollment. He played an important role in securing married student housing at the nearby Willow Run Airport. University administrators did not believe that the university was prepared for the amount of food that would be brought in for the dorms, so Briggs worked to raise funds for the eventual food service building. Briggs was also critical in financing the building of key University of Michigan facilities such as Alice Lloyd Hall, South Quadrangle, the School of Business Administration, and the Administration Building, as well as acquiring land that would become the University of Michigan's North Campus. He reviewed different available land options the university could purchase, and settled on the site of what is now North Campus. Many within the university thought present-day North Campus was too far to be a part of the University, however Briggs argued that it was the best location because it would allow for the most expansion, and with this expansion came the realization that the physical and architectural face of the university was changing. Briggs said, "Each architect wants to leave his monument. And each one has got his own ideas. And which do you do? Do you let them have some fun and give the benefit of their best judgement, or do you straight lace them and tell them to do it your way. And we didn't do it that way."

== Vice president of Consumer Power Company ==
In 1951, Briggs resigned from his position as vice-president of business and finance at the University of Michigan in order to become the financial vice-president of nearby Consumer Power Company in Jackson, Michigan. Before he left Michigan, Briggs was thought to be a possible replacement for the retiring University of Michigan President Ruthven as he had a very successful tenure as an educator and administrator at the University of Michigan. Upon Briggs' resignation, the Ann Arbor News wrote, "When he leaves to go to his new post, he leaves the University as a bigger and better place for his foresight and provision in fields once foreign to learning."

Briggs became financial vice-president of Consumer Power Company in 1951. In 1952, Briggs was made executive vice-president and a member of the company's board of directors. At the Consumer Power Company, Briggs was tasked with running the company's financing, insurance, pensions, and other corporate activities. He retired on May 1, 1968, because of a company policy of retiring at the age of 65. However, he would stay on the board of directors until 1968.

== Other professional positions ==
In 1959, Briggs became founding president of Michigan State Chamber of Commerce. The Michigan Chamber of Commerce promotes conditions that are favorable to business growth within the State of Michigan. While president, Briggs argued in the Detroit Free Press that, "Reduced taxes on business will improve our competitive position and stimulate the flow of risk capital back into Michigan."

On October 1, 1956, Briggs was added to the board of directors of the Federal Reserve Bank of Chicago. Briggs would be a member of the board of directors until he was nominated as a candidate for election to the Michigan State Board of Education in 1958. Briggs would go on to lose the election for the state board of education.

== Board of regents of the University of Michigan ==
In 1964, University of Michigan Regent William McInally died, giving Michigan Governor George Romney the rare opportunity to nominate a regent. Governor Romney selected Briggs to fill the seat on the University of Michigan's Board of Regents. Romney said, "Bob Briggs is exceptionally well qualified for this important post and I am sure that by virtue of his long and faithful association with The University of Michigan, he will contribute significantly to the future growth of this fine institution." Briggs very much wanted to join the board of regents, saying later in an interview, "I definitely wanted (seat on Board of Regents) ... It was a great responsibility, because you were setting the framework with a pattern that was going to be followed. And the issues that came to the Board of Regents were pretty fundamental." In 1968, while a member of the board of regents for the University, Briggs was also chairman of a committee that selected the replacement for retiring President Hatcher. The committee would select then University of Wisconsin provost Robben Wright Fleming to be the next President of the University of Michigan, a position he would hold until 1979. Briggs was criticized by some in the media when he refused to announce President Fleming's salary when Fleming was hired, saying, "Salaries at the U. of M. have never been a matter of public record." Briggs was a member of the Board of Regents of the University of Michigan during a time when there was much political unrest in the university community, especially amongst the students. He would later say, "Our first reaction, of course, was we don't want that around here. But it wasn't were long before you realized that this was something that was with us, and we had to find a way to work with the students and gradually it was recognized as something you had to face up to."

In 1968, Governor Romney asked Briggs to leave the University of Michigan Board of Regents in order to become the Commissioner of Michigan Financial Institutions, a role he honored until 1973, when he became a consultant for the Bureau of Department of Commerce for the state.

== President of University of Michigan Alumni Association ==
Briggs was recruited by the alumni of the University of Michigan to become president of the Alumni Association in 1979. His long history with the school and expansion of the school while vice president were the main factors in his recruitment. The alumni association was in need of a new building on campus, and they wanted Briggs to spearhead the project given his prior experience in expanding the school.

== Awards ==
Briggs received numerous awards and honors throughout his life. In 1962, he was awarded the Wolverine Frontiersman Award by the State of Michigan, "in recognition of his contributions to the advancement of Michigan." In 1992, Briggs was awarded the Alumni Achievement Award from the University of Michigan's School of Business Administration's Alumni Society Board of Governors. They said, "Through a long and successful life, (Briggs) has always used his talents to guide himself and others toward the highest standards of citizenship and service and achievement in both the public and private realms of his life." In 1969, Briggs was awarded an honorary Doctor Of Law from the board of regents of the University of Michigan.

== Vision for education ==
Briggs' strong vision for public education in America and for the University of Michigan prompted him to say, "But part of it is other things in the minds of the public becoming a lot more important than higher education. And to my mind, higher education is the most important responsibility that the University has" in reference to the importance of higher education. Briggs also accurately predicted that with the decrease of the size of the auto industry within the State of Michigan, the university would see a cut in the size of its state funding and thus would have to rely more heavily on private funds.

== Personal life and death ==
Briggs married Maxine Eloise Corliss December 22, 1925, in Lansing, Michigan. Together they had two children: Ruth and Peter. Briggs died on September 2, 1998, at the age of 95, at his home in Elk Lake, Michigan.
