= Vietnam War protests at the University of Michigan =

1960s anti-war protests in Ann Arbor

Vietnam War protests at the University of Michigan occurred during the 1960s, when many students and professors from the University of Michigan gathered together in opposition of the Vietnam War. Together, they held a series of student protests and faculty demonstrations that challenged the U.S. government as well as the university administration. While these protests were part of a national trend, those at the University of Michigan stand out for early influence on other universities as well as their persistent nature.

== Background ==
Several preceding events set the stage for these protests. Soon-to-be president John F. Kennedy's midnight speech at the Michigan Union in 1960 (laying out a proposal for what would later become the Peace Corps) helped spark student activism, as students became more invested in and enthusiastic about solving the many domestic issues facing the country.

This coincided with a growing political movement by students at the University of Michigan, especially around civil rights. In February 1960, in solidarity with the Greensboro sit-ins, a coalition of Ann Arbor students and townspeople began to picket Kresge and Woolworth stores, and then any hometown businesses who discriminated against African Americans, every Saturday for nearly 9 months. Civil rights organizations like the Student Nonviolent Coordinating Committee had chapters in Ann Arbor and activists such as Martin Luther King Jr., Malcolm X, Bob Moses, Stokely Carmichael, and Julian Bond platformed their views in Ann Arbor. In 1964, President Lyndon Johnson gave the University’s commencement address, where he shared his vision of a Great Society free from poverty and racial injustice. All of this created a political climate and culture of activism at the university.

It was in 1960 that Students for a Democratic Society (SDS) had their first meeting in Ann Arbor, a group composed of a primarily northern, white cohort, which rose in popularity and spread to other college campuses. The student activist group advocated for America's youth and their greater participation in democracy. They became more well-known after publishing the Port Huron Statement, a manifesto of their platform that outlined a bold vision of leftists American politics, signaled the establishment of the New Left, and became the foundation for Anti-Vietnam War sentiments. These sentiments stirred as tensions grew in the U.S. and military activity increased Vietnam. The assassination of John F. Kennedy, the Gulf of Tonkin Resolution, Operation Rolling Thunder, and the final decision by Lyndon B. Johnson to send U.S. combat forces into battle in Vietnam proved too much to be ignored by University of Michigan students and faculty.

== Teach-in ==
In March 1965, after President Johnson's decision to send U.S. combat forces to Vietnam, a group of 58 University of Michigan professors formed the Faculty Committee to Stop the War in Vietnam, whose goal was to organize and encourage other professors to stage a faculty strike. This idea provoked backlash from Michigan Governor George Romney and University President Harlan Hatcher, so an alternative plan to conduct a "teach-in" was created.

The first-ever anti-war teach-in lasted from 8 pm on March 24 to 8 am on March 25 in the Angell Hall Auditorium, and consisted of three major speeches, many guest speakers, and other activities like singing and watching films. Despite two bomb threats from a pro-Vietnam War group disrupting the night, the teach-in was viewed as a major success, with over 3,000 students attending and over 200 faculty showing support. The teach-in stood as a clear message in moral and political opposition of the Vietnam War, and marked the first time professors were political on campus, a significant moment in the anti-war movement. It would also mark a transition from faculty to students as leaders of anti-war activism. While professors had started the University of Michigan protests, pressure from higher administration officials meant that students would now have to take the initiative to organize.

== Further protests ==
Following this initial teach-in protest, more radical student demonstrations took place in Ann Arbor. The International Days of Protest, an idea initiated by students from the University of California, Berkeley, took place on October 15–16, 1965. Berkeley collaborated with the Ann Arbor Vietnam Day Committee to hold protests against the U.S. military presence in Vietnam and was supported by many of the professors who took part in the March teach-in.

On October 15, SDS activists held a vigil at the Diag, a subsequent rally, and a protest at the Selective Service Office in downtown Ann Arbor. Some picketed the office outdoors, but others conducted a sit-in protest and sang songs about ending the war, leading to the arrest of 39 protesters for trespassing and civil disobedience. Further outcry came when the University of Michigan handed over student and faculty records to the House of Un-American Activities Committee, believing that the university was not standing up for their First Amendment rights.

This began a growing disdain against the university's involvement and cooperation with the government, rather than just the Vietnam War itself. Specifically, students and professors protested the ROTC and military recruitment programs present on campus, the university's classified research for the military, and Dow Chemical's napalm production. These included repeated, sometimes violent protests against military recruiters and calls for the abolition of the ROTC, as well as continued sit-ins and teach-ins (such as the one occurring in the Administration Building in November 1967 against the university's military research and the one in North Hall in 1968 against military involvement on campus).

== Legacy ==
These protests not only stood as catalysts for activism on other campuses, but created a culture of student activism at the University of Michigan. The first teach-in received national attention and was soon replicated at other universities, seen by Columbia University's the next day and many others that occurred over the subsequent months. These Vietnam War protests also empowered the student body and gave them a voice in administrative decisions. More protests on different university subjects occurred throughout the 1960s and into the next decades, such as the Black Action Movement and student housing protests. Today, many University of Michigan students are involved in political activism.
