= President of the University of Michigan =

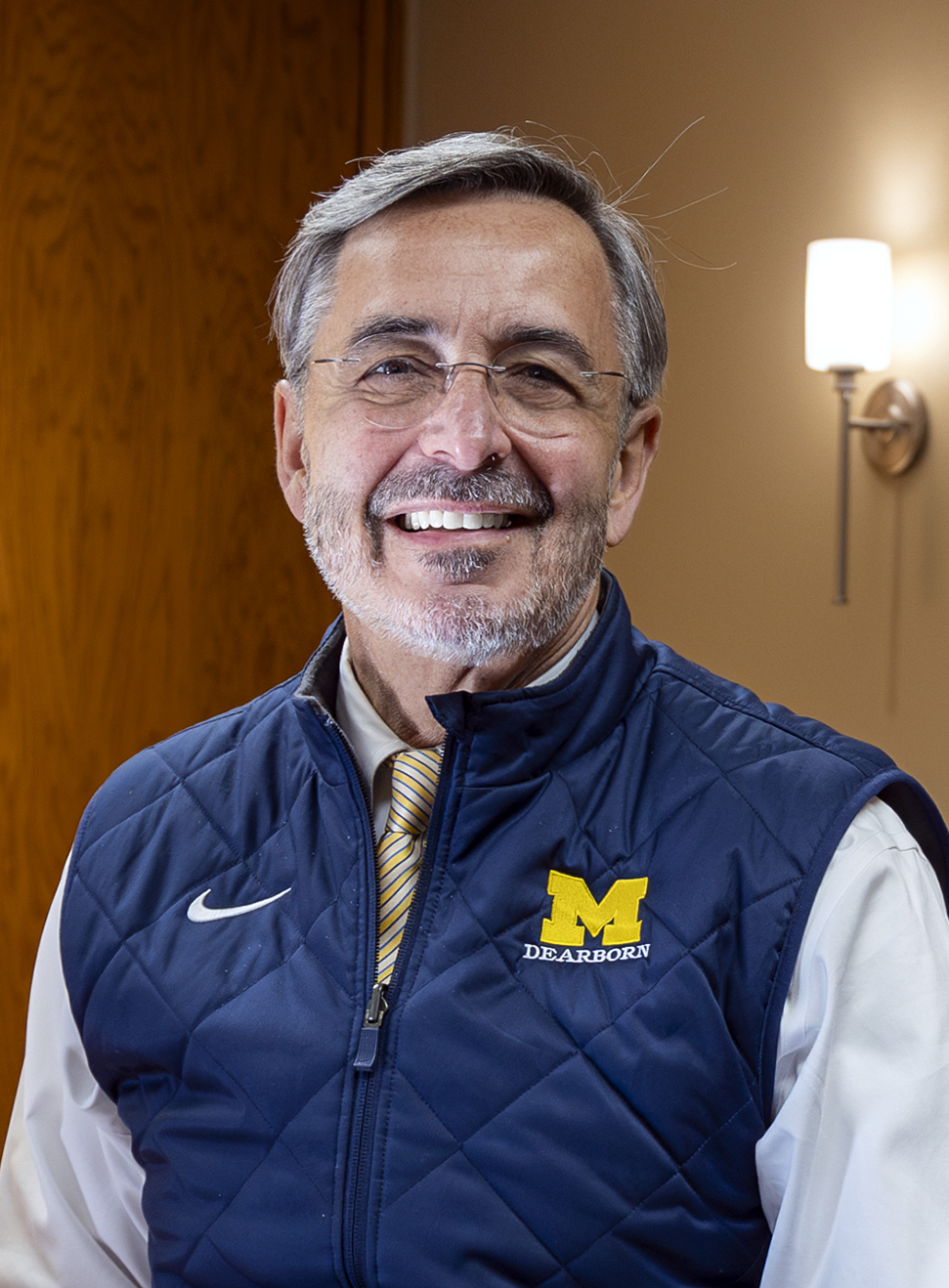
- Incumbent; Domenico Grasso since May 8, 2025
- Residence: President's House
- Appointer: Board of Regents
- Constituting instrument: Constitution of Michigan
- Formation: 1850
- First holder: Rev. John Monteith (historical); Henry Philip Tappan (1852)
- Salary: $1,014,000
- Website: president.umich.edu

The president of the University of Michigan is a constitutional officer of the state of Michigan who serves as the principal executive officer of the University of Michigan. The president is chosen by the Board of Regents of the University of Michigan, as provided for in the Constitution of the State of Michigan. Sixteen people—fifteen men and one woman—have held the office, in addition to several others who have held it in either an historical, acting or interim capacity.

The University of Michigan's current president is Domenico Grasso, former chancellor of the Dearborn campus. Grasso was appointed by the Board of Regents on May 8, 2025 as interim president, and he was named the 16th president in May 2026 after Kent Syverud, who had been elected to become the next president of the University of Michigan, announced that he had been diagnosed with brain cancer and would not take up the role.

== History ==
The office was created by the Michigan Constitution of 1850, which also specified that the president was to be appointed by the Regents of the University of Michigan and preside at their meetings, but without a vote. The precise wording has evolved through subsequent state constitutions, and as of November 2018 the office is defined by Article VIII, section 5 of the Constitution of 1963:

The regents of the University of Michigan and their successors in office shall constitute a body corporate known as the Regents of the University of Michigan; ... Each board shall, as often as necessary, elect a president of the institution under its supervision. He shall be the principal executive officer of the institution, be ex-officio a member of the board without the right to vote and preside at meetings of the board. ...

Between the establishment of the University of Michigan in 1837 and 1850, the Board of Regents ran the university directly; by law, they were supposed to appoint a chancellor to administer the university, but they never did, and a rotating roster of professors carried out day-to-day administrative duties instead.

While the modern office was created in 1850, the University of Michigan itself traces its date of founding to 1817, when its precursor, the University of Michigania, was founded. The only president of the institution, Reverend John Monteith, appears in the list of presidents but is not officially considered to have been a president of the contemporary university.

== List of presidents ==
The current president is Domenico Grasso, former chancellor of the University of Michigan-Dearborn.

Of the previous presidents of the university:

- 1 had the office abolished
- 1 died in office
- 2 were removed by the regents
- 5 retired at the end of their careers
- 2 resigned to return to teaching or research
- 4 resigned to take posts at other institutions (Northwestern University, the Corporation for Public Broadcasting, Princeton University, Columbia University, and the University of Florida)

The following persons have served as president of the University of Michigan:

Presidents of the University of Michigan
No.	Portrait	Name	Term start	Term end	Refs.
President of the University of Michigania (1817–1821)
–		Rev. John Monteith (Note: First and only president of the University of Michigania. No collegiate student was enrolled during his presidency.)	1817	1821	
Board of Trustees of the University of Michigania (1821–1837) (Note: Operating under laws established by the Michigan Territorial governor and judges in 1821, a board of trustees consisting of 20 citizen-members plus the governor was formed to guide the University of Michigania. Still, no collegiate students were enrolled.)
Board of Regents of the University of Michigan (1837–1852) (Note: Under laws establish by the new Michigan state constitution of 1835, a Board of Regents was convened to established the new University of Michigan. First students were enrolled at Ann Arbor in 1841.)
Presidents of the University of Michigan (1852–present)
1		Henry Philip Tappan (Note: First president of the University of Michigan.)	September 1852	June 25, 1863 (Note: Removed by regents.)	
2		Erastus Otis Haven	June 25, 1863	August 18, 1869 (Note: Resigned to head Northwestern University.)	
acting		Henry S. Frieze	August 18, 1869	July 31, 1871	
3		James Burrill Angell	August 1, 1871	September 30, 1909 (Note: Retired after 38 years in office (longest-serving president))	
acting		Henry S. Frieze	1880 (Note: While President Angell served as United States Minister to China)	1882	
acting		Henry S. Frieze	1887 (Note: While President Angell served on the commission negotiating the Bayard-Chamberlain Treaty)	1888	
acting		Harry Burns Hutchins (Note: Was the first student to receive a degree from James B. Angell at Michigan.)	1897 (Note: While President Angell served as United States Minister to Turkey)	1898	
interim		Harry Burns Hutchins	October 1, 1909 (Note: Following President Angell's retirement.)	June 28, 1910	
4		Harry Burns Hutchins	June 28, 1910	June 30, 1920	
5		Marion LeRoy Burton	July 1, 1920	February 18, 1925 (Note: Died in office)	
acting		Alfred Henry Lloyd	February 27, 1925	September 30, 1925	
6		Clarence Cook Little	October 1, 1925	June 1929 (Note: Resigned to conduct research at Bar Harbor, Maine.)	
7		Alexander Grant Ruthven	October 5, 1929	August 31, 1951	
8		Harlan Hatcher	September 1, 1951	December 31, 1967	
9		Robben Wright Fleming	January 1, 1968	December 31, 1978 (Note: Resigned to head the Corporation for Public Broadcasting)	
interim		Allan Frederick Smith	January 1, 1979	December 31, 1979	
10		Harold Tafler Shapiro	January 1, 1980	December 31, 1988 (Note: Resigned to head Princeton University.)	
interim		Robben Wright Fleming	January 4, 1988	August 31, 1988	
11		James Johnson Duderstadt	September 1, 1988	June 30, 1996 (Note: Returned to the classroom.)	
interim		Homer A. Neal	July 1, 1996	January 31, 1997	
12		Lee Bollinger	February 1, 1997	December 31, 2001 (Note: Resigned to head Columbia University in the City of New York.)	
interim		B. Joseph White	January 1, 2002	July 31, 2002	
13		Mary Sue Coleman (Note: First female president)	August 1, 2002	June 30, 2014	
14		Mark Schlissel	July 1, 2014	January 15, 2022 (Note: Removed by regents for an alleged sexual affair with a subordinate.)	
interim		Mary Sue Coleman	January 15, 2022	October 13, 2022	
15		Santa Ono	October 14, 2022	May 6, 2025 (Note: Resigned on May 4 to head the University of Florida. Resignation from Michigan accepted on May 6. Rejected by the Florida Board of Governors for his appointment as UF president one month later, on June 3.)	
16		Domenico Grasso	May 8, 2025 (Note: Appointed on May 8, 2025, on an interim basis following Santa Ono's resignation. His interim appointment was amended by the Regents on April 14, 2026, to a full appointment as the university's 16th president, retroactive to May 8, 2025, after president-elect Kent Syverud stepped down before taking office.)	incumbent	
elected		Kent Syverud	did not serve (Note: Syverud was elected on January 12, 2026, to take office on July 1, 2026, but did not assume the role due to a brain cancer diagnosis in April 2026.)	–	
17		C. Cybele Raver	December 1, 2026	–	
