= Marjorie Corcoran =

American particle physicist

- Born: July 21, 1950; Dayton, Ohio
- Died: February 3, 2017 (aged 66); Houston, Texas
- Spouse: Christopher Corcoran
- Scientific career
- Fields: Particle Physics
- Institutions: University of Dayton, Indiana University Bloomington, University of Wisconsin-Madison, Rice University, Fermilab
- Thesis: Measurement of the polarization parameter in proton-proton elastic scattering for beam momenta ranging from 20 GeV/c to 200 GeV/c
- Doctoral advisor: Homer Neal

Marjorie Diane Blasius Corcoran (July 21, 1950 – February 3, 2017) was an American particle physicist and professor at Rice University.

== Biography ==
Born as Marjorie Blasius, she grew up in Beavercreek, Ohio, graduating from Beavercreek High School as co-valedictorian in 1968. To begin her higher education, in 1972 she completed her bachelor's degree at the University of Dayton, graduating summa cum laude. That same year she married Christopher Corcoran, taking his surname. As a graduate student at Indiana University Bloomington, she began doing high-energy physics research at Fermilab. Her 1977 doctoral dissertation, Measurement of the polarization parameter in proton-proton elastic scattering for beam momenta ranging from 20 GeV/c to 200 GeV/c, was supervised by Homer Neal. After earning her Ph.D. in 1977, Corcoran continued studies for 2 years at the University of Wisconsin-Madison. She joined the Rice University faculty in 1980, where she would continue to teach for 37 years. At Rice, she was the first speaker of the Rice Faculty Senate upon its formation in 2005.

She died while bicycling to work on February 3, 2017, in Houston, from a collision with a METRORail train.

== Contributions ==
As a professor at Rice, Corcoran continued her work at Fermilab as part of several large collaborative physics projects including the D0 experiment, KTeV collaboration, and the muon-to-electron-conversion experiment.

She also worked in physics outreach activities that included founding the Houston QuarkNet Program for high school physics students and teachers. She helped to found the Women in Physics Group at Rice, sending undergraduates to physics conferences, and otherwise encouraging other women to participate in physics.

== Awards and honors ==
In 1992, the American Physical Society (APS) named her as a fellow "for contributions to experiments studying spin asymmetries in hadronic collision". She was also awarded the Distinguished Scientist Award from the University of Wisconsin physics department in 2008. In 2015, the APS listed her as their January 2015 Woman of the Month.
