= Homer Neal =

American particle physicist

Homer Alfred Neal
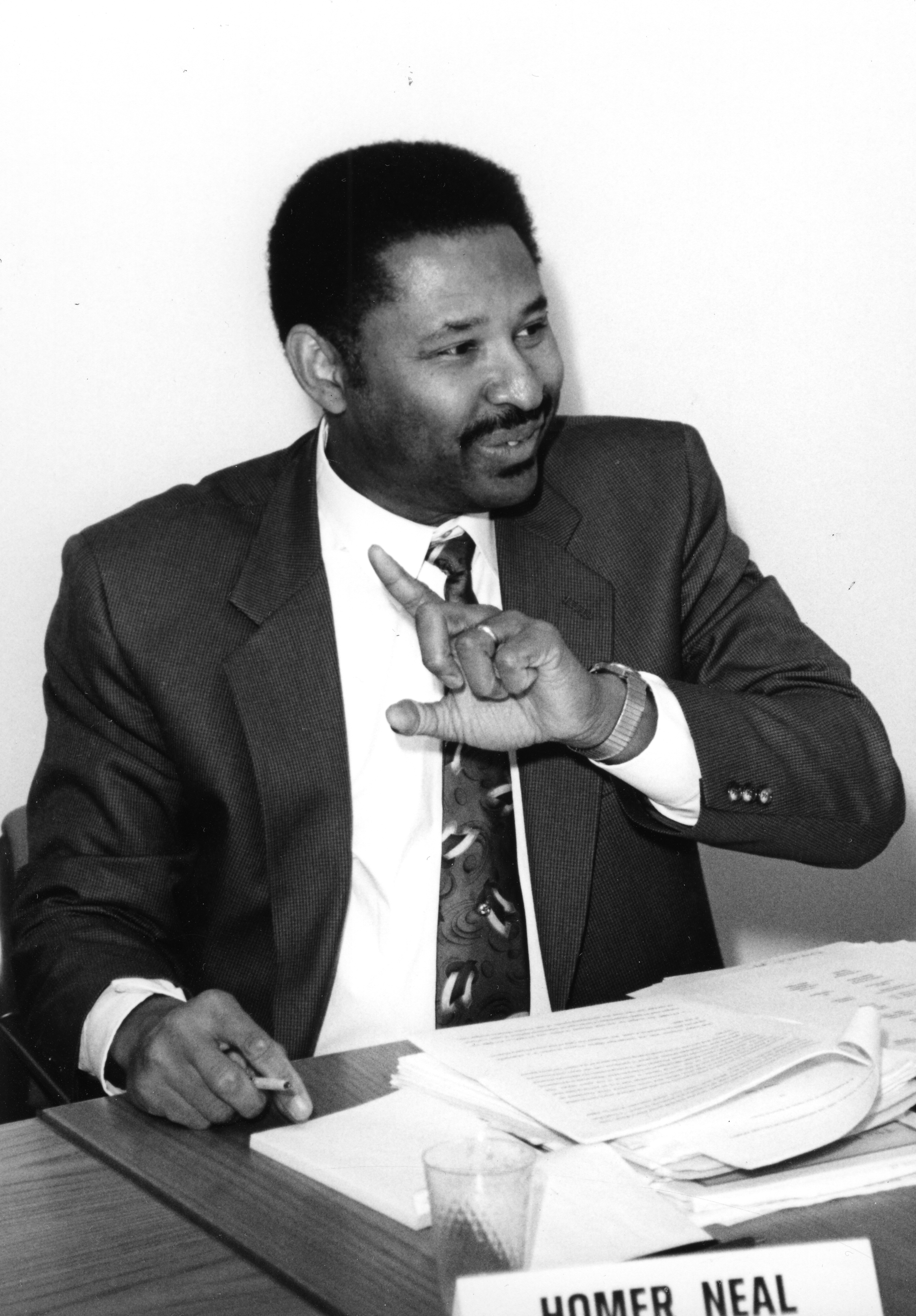
- Neal at the Physics Today roundtable, November 1991
- Born: June 13, 1942; Franklin, Kentucky, US
- Died: May 23, 2018 (aged 75)
- Education: Indiana University Bloomington (BS); University of Michigan (PhD)
- Awards: Sloan Fellowship; Guggenheim Fellowship (1980); Edward A. Bouchet Award (2003)

Interim President of the University of Michigan
- In office 1996–1996
- Preceded by: James J. Duderstadt
- Succeeded by: Lee C. Bollinger
- Scientific career
- Fields: Nuclear physics
- Workplaces: CERN; University of Michigan
- Thesis: The polarization parameter in elastic proton-proton scattering from .75 to 2.84 GeV. (1966)
- Doctoral advisor: Michael J. Longo
- Notable students: Marjorie Corcoran

Homer Alfred Neal (June 13, 1942 – May 23, 2018) was an American particle physicist and a distinguished professor at the University of Michigan. Neal was president of the American Physical Society in 2016. He was also a board member of Ford Motor Company, a council member of the National Museum of African American History and Culture, and a director of the Richard Lounsbery Foundation. Neal was the interim President of the University of Michigan in 1996. Neal's research group works as part of the ATLAS experiment hosted at CERN in Geneva.

== Biography ==
Neal grew up an African-American in highly segregated Franklin, Kentucky, and was forced to break off relations with a white friend with whom he had bonded over a shared interest in ham radio. He received his B.S. in physics from Indiana University Bloomington in 1961, his M.S. from the University of Michigan in 1963, and earned his Ph.D. from the University of Michigan in 1966. From 1976 to 1981, Neal was Dean for Research and Graduate Development at Indiana University, and from 1981 to 1986 he was provost at the State University of New York at Stony Brook.

Neal served as a Regent for the Smithsonian Institution from 1989 to 2001. He served for 18 years on the board of directors of Ford Motor Company, from 1997 to 2014. Neal also served as a director for the Richard Lounsbery Foundation for 13 years.

Neal held Honorary Doctorates from Indiana University, Michigan State University, the University of Notre Dame.

On November 14, 2009, Neal described the discoveries of spin at the University of Michigan with a presentation: History of Spin at Michigan.

Neal died on May 23, 2018, at the age of 75.

On April 14, 2023, the University of Michigan dedicated the Homer A. Neal Laboratory. The Neal Laboratory is the first academic building on Central Campus to be named after a Black member of the University of Michigan community.

== Science policy ==
Homer Neal was a notable figure in U.S. science policy. From 1980 to 1986, Neal served as a member of the National Science Board of the National Science Foundation, the federal agency responsible for the funding of basic research. While on the National Science Board he chaired the committee that produced the board's first comprehensive report on undergraduate science education. He has also served as chairman of the physics advisory committee of the National Science Foundation. Over the course of his career, Neal has delivered testimony on numerous occasions to Congress.

Neal also served as regent of the Smithsonian Institution and on numerous advisory committees for science, research and policy organizations including Oak Ridge National Laboratory, Argonne National Laboratory, the board of the Center for Strategic and International Studies, Lawrence Berkeley Laboratory, Fermilab, and others. He served as a member of the National Research Council Board on Physics and Astronomy and as a member of the American Physical Society (APS)'s Panel on Public Affairs. He was a recipient of the Society's Bouchet Award. He was an elected Fellow of the American Academy of Arts & Sciences

In 2013, Neal was elected to be the vice-president of the American Physical Society, an association representing over 51,000 physicists in academia, national labs, and industry in the United States and worldwide. In 2015, he served as President-Elect and served as President of the APS in 2016. Homer Neal was a co-author of Beyond Sputnik: U.S. Science Policy in the 21st Century, a popular textbook and website on science policy. He served on the Advisory Board of the Journal of Science Policy & Governance.

In Apr 2014, colleagues and friends from around the world gathered at UM in Ann Arbor for a Homer Neal Symposium to honor Dr. Neal. The sessions focused on Neal's experiments at Brookhaven, Argonne, SLAC, Fermilab, and CERN, as well as his contributions to the US government as a member of the National Science Board, and to the Smithsonian Institution as a regent. At the Symposium, he noted Emil Konopinski had advised him go to graduate school at UM.

== Death ==
According to Dr. Neal's widow, Donna Jean Neal, he died of a stroke, which he had suffered in February, 2018, and from which he had never recovered. Dr. Neal was also survived by his daughter, "Sharon-Denise Neal, who trained as an archaeologist, and Homer A. Neal Jr., a physicist and staff scientist at SLAC National Accelerator Laboratory at Stanford University; and four grandchildren."

== Bibliography ==
- Beyond Sputnik: U.S. Science Policy in the 21st Century (2008), ISBN 0472033069

Academic offices
Preceded by James Duderstadt	Interim President of the University of Michigan; 1996	Succeeded by Lee Bollinger
