= Allan F. Smith =

Law professor

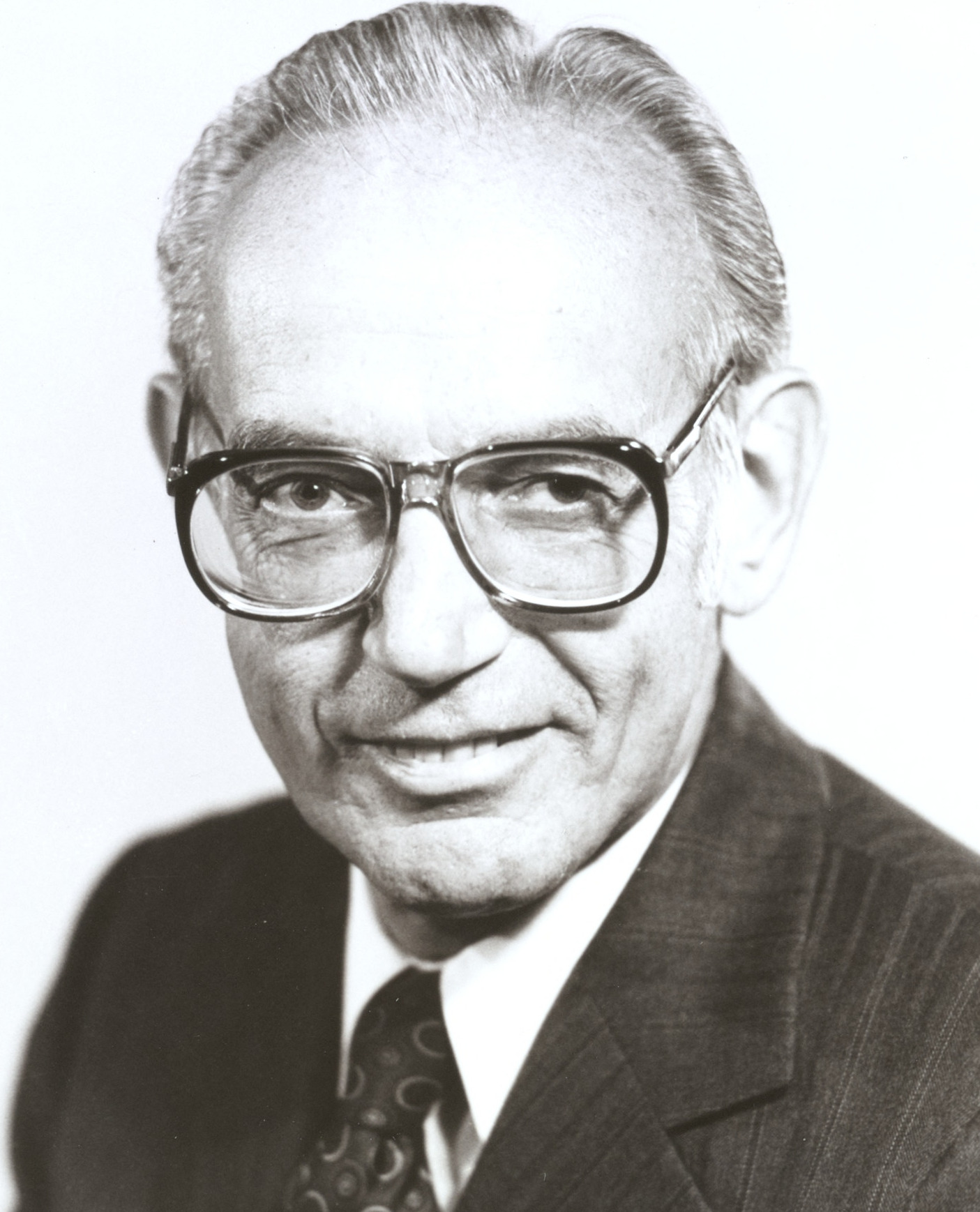
- Smith in 1980

Interim President of the University of Michigan
- In office 1979–1979
- Preceded by: Robben Wright Fleming
- Succeeded by: Harold Tafler Shapiro

9th Dean of University of Michigan Law School
- In office 1960–1965
- Preceded by: E. Blythe Stason
- Succeeded by: Charles Wycliffe Joiner

Personal details
- Born: December 19, 1911 Belgrade, Nebraska
- Died: January 21, 1994 (aged 82) Sarasota, Florida
- Education: Keamey State Teachers College (A.B., 1933); University of Nebraska (LL.B., 1940); University of Michigan (S.J.D. 1950)

Allan Frederick Smith (December 19, 1911 – January 21, 1994) was a law professor and dean at the University of Michigan Law School. He was an expert in personal property law and real estate transactions.

Before joining the University of Michigan faculty in 1947, he served for the Office of Price Administration and the United States Army. Smith was interim president of the University of Michigan in 1979 after the resignation of Robben Wright Fleming.

== Bibliography ==
- 1950 - Personal Life Insurance Trusts
- 1951 - Basic Property Law
- 1956 - The Law of Future Interests

Academic offices
Preceded by Robben Wright Fleming	Interim President of the University of Michigan; 1979	Succeeded by Harold Tafler Shapiro
