= Harold T. Shapiro =

American economist and university administrator

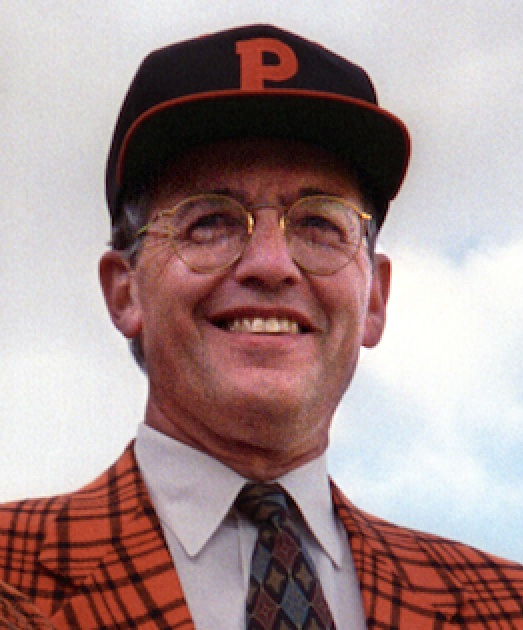
- Shapiro at a 1994 Princeton Tigers football game

18th President of Princeton University
- In office 1988–2001
- Preceded by: William G. Bowen
- Succeeded by: Shirley Tilghman

10th President of the University of Michigan
- In office 1980–1988
- Preceded by: Allan F. Smith (interim); Robben Wright Fleming
- Succeeded by: Robben Wright Fleming (interim); James J. Duderstadt

Personal details
- Born: June 8, 1935 (age 91) Montreal, Quebec, Canada
- Spouse: Vivian Shapiro
- Education: McGill University (BCom, LLD); Princeton University (MA, PhD)
- Occupation: Economics professor
- Awards: William D. Carey Award for Leadership in Science Policy (2006); Clark Kerr Medal for Distinguished Leadership in Higher Education (2008); NAS Public Welfare Medal (2012)
- Scientific career
- Fields: Finance
- Thesis: The Canadian monetary sector: an econometric analysis (1964)

Harold Tafler Shapiro (born June 8, 1935) is an economist and university administrator. He is currently a professor of economics and public affairs at the Princeton School of Public and International Affairs at Princeton University. Shapiro served as the president of the University of Michigan from 1980 to 1988 and as the president of Princeton University from 1988 to 2001.

== Biography ==
=== Early life and education ===
Born to a Jewish family in Montreal, Quebec, Shapiro attended Lower Canada College, a prestigious independent school in Montreal which was at that time boys-only. He earned his B.Comm., with honors, from McGill University in 1956 and his Ph.D. from Princeton University in 1964, both in the field of economics. His doctoral dissertation was titled "The Canadian monetary sector: an econometric analysis."

Shapiro's parents owned the famous Ruby Foo's in Montreal. After his father's untimely death, the restaurant was passed down to him and his twin brother, Bernard, who would later become the first Ethics Commissioner of Canada and 14th principal of McGill University. Shapiro managed the restaurant while studying economics at McGill University, where he also began graduate school until he moved to Princeton University.

=== Career ===
He joined the faculty of the University of Michigan as assistant professor of economics in 1964. He held a variety of academic and administrative appointments, including as chairman of its department of economics and vice-president for academic affairs, until his selection as president of that university in 1980. He was president of Michigan until he left to become president of Princeton University in 1988. As Princeton's president, Shapiro oversaw the largest increase in the university endowment in the history of the school. Shapiro was elected Fellow of the American Academy of Arts and Sciences and a member of the American Philosophical Society in 1990. He announced his retirement from the presidency of Princeton in fall 2000 to take effect in June 2001. Shirley Tilghman, his successor, took office on June 15 of the following year.

Shapiro continues to live in Princeton, and is professor emeritus in the departments of economics and public policy at the university. He is trustee emeritus of the Institute for Advanced Study. His present academic interests include bioethics, on which he writes extensively. Shapiro chaired the National Bioethics Advisory Commission during President Bill Clinton's second term. He also sits on the boards of a number of prominent ventures, including the for-profit HCA (founded by the Frist family, which donated the Frist Campus Center to Princeton), and the non-profit Alfred P. Sloan Foundation and Robert Wood Johnson Medical School. He is a fellow of the Hastings Center, an independent bioethics research institution. He also served on the United States Olympic Committee for a number of years, and was a director of Dow Chemical Company.

=== Research ===
His fields of specialization in economics include econometrics, science policy, and the evolution of postsecondary education. He is author of several books, including A Larger Sense of Purpose: Higher Education and Society (Princeton University Press, 2005). In 2000, Shapiro received the Council of Scientific Society Presidents Citation for Outstanding Leadership. In 2008, he was awarded the Clark Kerr Medal for Distinguished Leadership in Higher Education, presented annually by the University of California-Berkeley Academic Senate. He also received the William D. Carey Award for leadership in Science Policy from the American Association for the Advancement of Science.

Academic offices
Preceded by Allan F. Smith (interim); Robben Wright Fleming	10th President of the University of Michigan; 1980–1988	Succeeded by Robben Wright Fleming (interim); James J. Duderstadt
Preceded by William G. Bowen	President of Princeton University; 1988–2001	Succeeded by Shirley Tilghman
