= Domenico Grasso =

American environmental engineer

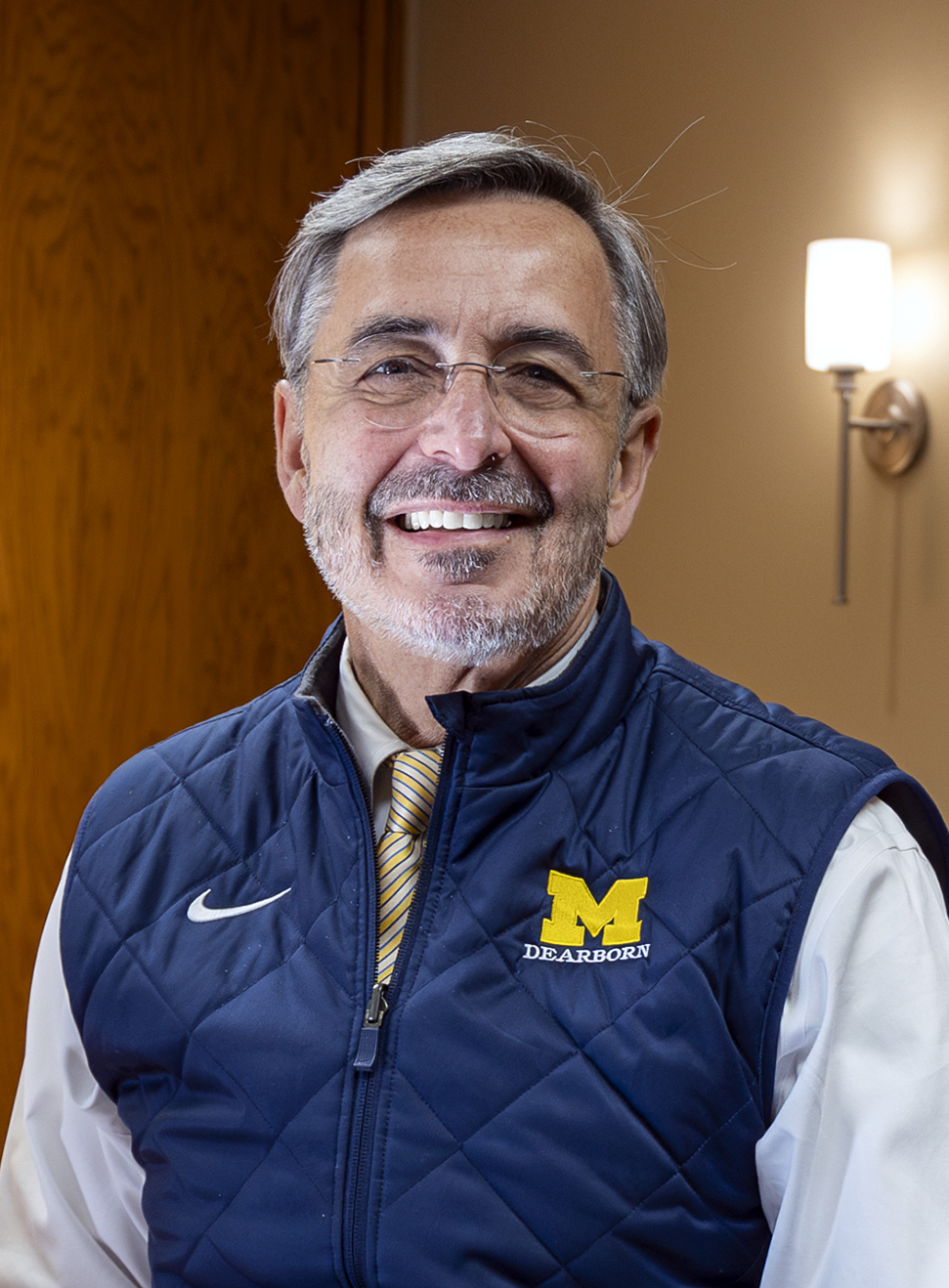
- Grasso in 2024

16th President of the University of Michigan
- Incumbent
- Assumed office May 8, 2025
- Preceded by: Santa Ono

6th Chancellor of the University of Michigan–Dearborn
- In office August 1, 2018 – May 8, 2025
- Preceded by: Daniel Little
- Succeeded by: Gabriella Scarlatta

Provost of the University of Delaware
- In office August 15, 2013 – October 15, 2017
- Preceded by: Tom Apple
- Succeeded by: Robin Morgan

Personal details
- Born: 1955 (age 70–71) Worcester, Massachusetts, U.S.
- Spouse: Susan Hull
- Children: 4
- Education: Worcester Polytechnic Institute (BS); Purdue University (MS); University of Michigan (PhD)
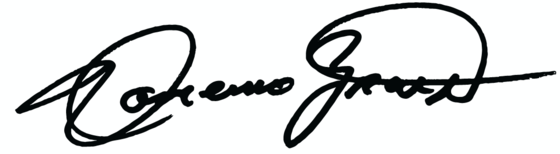
- Signature
- Scientific career
- Fields: Environmental engineering
- Workplaces: University of Connecticut; Smith College; University of Vermont; University of Delaware; University of Michigan
- Thesis: Ozonation dynamics in water treatment: Autocatalytic decomposition, mass transfer, and impact on particle stability (1987)
- Doctoral advisor: Walter Weber

Domenico Grasso (born 1955) is an American environmental engineer who has been the 16th president of the University of Michigan since May 8, 2025.

Grasso graduated from the University of Michigan College of Engineering with a PhD in environmental engineering in 1987. He served as dean of the College of Engineering and Mathematical Sciences at the University of Vermont from 2005 to 2013, as provost of the University of Delaware from 2013 to 2017, and as the 6th chancellor of the University of Michigan–Dearborn from August 2018 to May 2025.

== Early life and education ==
Grasso was born in Worcester, Massachusetts, on November 16, 1955, to Ciriaco Grasso, who immigrated from Ariano Irpino (Italy), and Tommasina Grasso (née Piracci) who was born in Boston, Massachusetts, but raised in Vieste, Italy.

Grasso received a Bachelor of Science with a major in civil engineering from the Worcester Polytechnic Institute in 1977, a Master of Science in civil engineering from Purdue University in 1979, and a Ph.D. in environmental engineering from the University of Michigan in 1987.

Grasso attended college on an Army Reserve Officers' Training Corps scholarship. He was part of the United States Army from 1977 to 1990 and resigned his commission as a major. He received awards that included the Army Service Ribbon, Army Overseas Reserve Components Training Ribbon, Army Commendation Medal and Army Parachutist Badge. He deployed as part of two REFORGERS, Certain Sentinel (1986) and Certain Challenge (1988).

== Academic career ==
=== University of Connecticut ===
Grasso joined the faculty of the University of Connecticut's Department of Civil and Environmental Engineering in 1989. He later served as department head from 1998 to 2000. During 1996, Grasso was a visiting scholar at the University of California, Berkeley.

=== Smith College ===
In 2000, he declined a chair position at Columbia University to become Smith College's Rosemary Bradford Hewlett Professor, where he became the Picker Engineering Program's first director, the United States' first women's college engineering program. While there, he collaborated with astronaut Sally Ride on TOYChallenge, a nationwide toy design event that encouraged STEM learning for middle school students.

=== University of Vermont ===
In 2005, Grasso was named the University of Vermont's dean of the College of Engineering and Mathematical Sciences and later served as vice president for research and dean of the Graduate College. While at the University of Vermont, he established the university-wide Complex Systems Center and initiated efforts to broaden engineering education to more intentionally include the liberal arts and social sciences, including the creation of a B.A. program in engineering and a B.S. in engineering science.

=== University of Delaware ===
Grasso began his appointment as provost at the University of Delaware in 2013. While in office, he created the Division of Enrollment Management and Institute for Financial Services Analytics. He also played a major role in new university programs in the humanities, arts, social sciences and entrepreneurship. In 2015, Grasso launched the Community Engagement Initiative.

=== University of Michigan ===
==== Dearborn ====
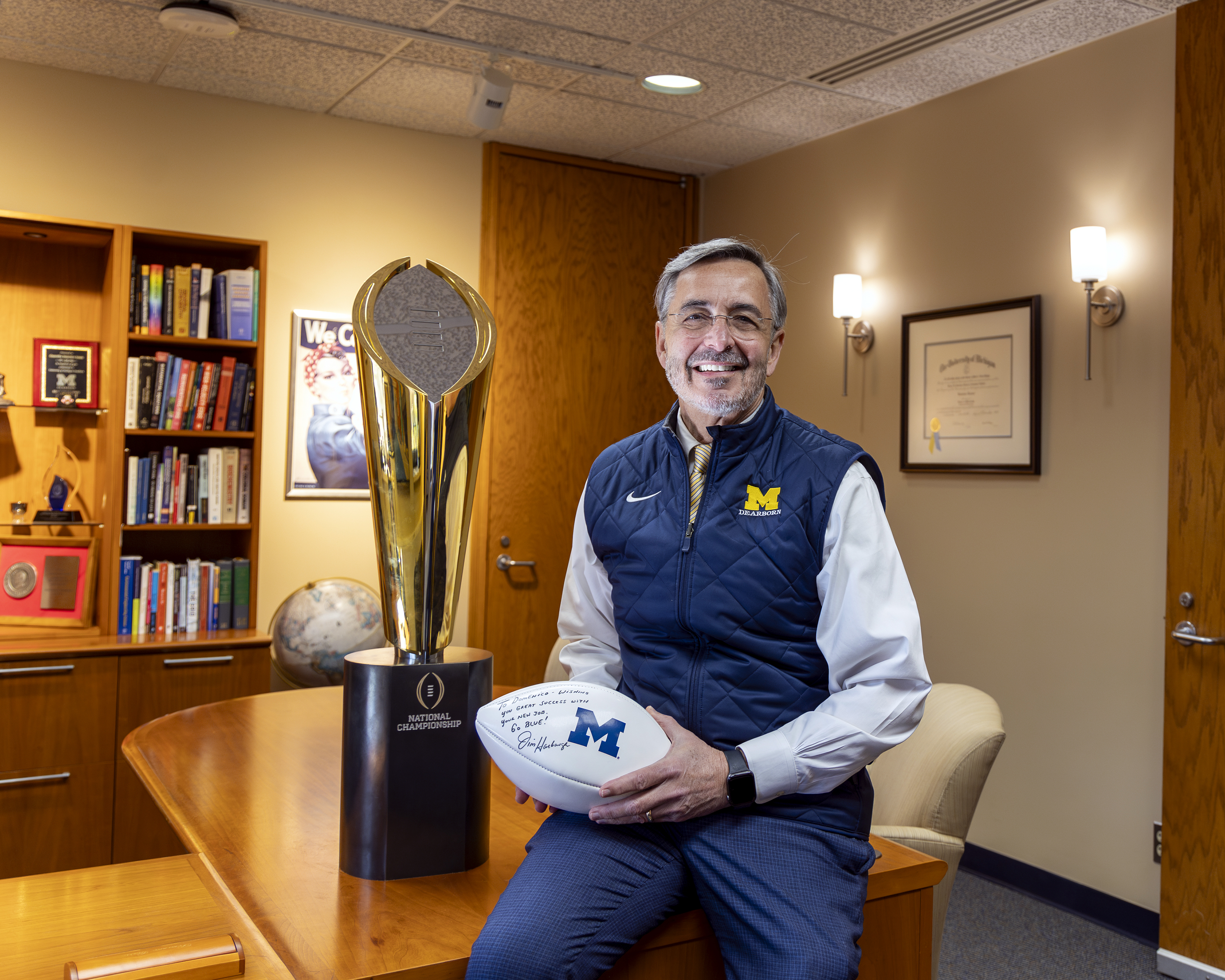
Grasso in his Dearborn office with the 2024 NCAA Football National Championship trophy on loan from Ann Arbor.

On February 15, 2018, Grasso was named the University of Michigan–Dearborn's sixth chancellor, beginning August 1, 2018. On February 16, 2023, The Board of Regents voted unanimously to reappoint him to a second term. He is the first University of Michigan alum to lead the Dearborn campus and is also a professor of public policy and sustainable engineering. Grasso transitioned the university to a need-based financial aid model, and, under his leadership, UM-Dearborn implemented the “Go Blue Guarantee,” which enables Michigan residents with family incomes of $125,000 or less to attend the university tuition free. Additionally, he oversaw the shift to a block tuition system and launched an initiative that provides all new first-year students with free football season tickets at Michigan Stadium.

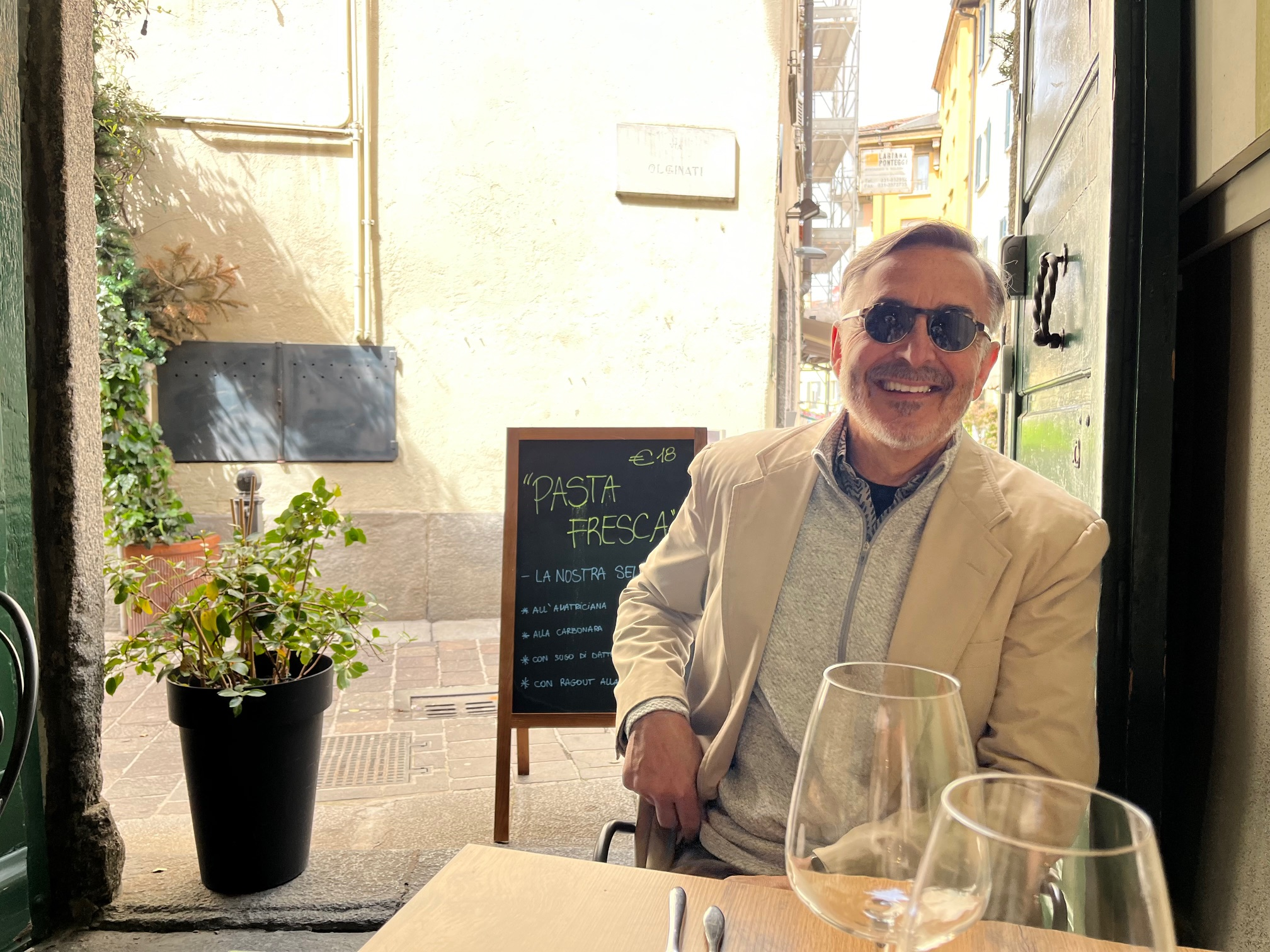
Grasso in Lake Como leading a Michigan Alumni tour of Northern Italy in 2024.

Grasso completed the first update to the campus master plan in nearly two decades, created a bike-friendly campus environment, and initiated an annual town-gown bike ride co-led with the mayor of Dearborn. In addition to his accomplishments at the university, Grasso served as a board member of the Metropolitan Affairs Coalition, New Detroit and the Citizens Research Council.

==== Ann Arbor ====
On May 8, 2025, the Regents of the University of Michigan appointed Grasso as interim president of the University of Michigan, effective immediately, following then-president Santa Ono's May 4 resignation for the presidency at the University of Florida. Grasso indicated that he would retire from the University of Michigan after a permanent president of the university assumed the office. Gabriella Scarlatta, then-provost of the Dearborn campus, was appointed interim chancellor of the Dearborn campus, succeeding Grasso. According to the University of Michigan–Ann Arbor October 2025 report pursuant to Section 241a(4)(k) of the State School Aid Act of 1979 of the state of Michigan, Grasso's annual salary for the 2025–2026 fiscal year is US$1.3 million.

On April 14, 2026, the Regents of the University of Michigan approved a contract amendment replacing Grasso's interim role with a full appointment as the university's 16th president, retroactively effective May 8, 2025, after president-elect Kent Syverud stepped down before taking office. The Regents also announced that they would plan to restart a search process for the 17th president of the university.

== Scholarship and research ==
Grasso's research focuses on how contaminants change and move in the environment over time, as well as processes to reduce their impacts on nature and human health. He has also written extensively on the intersection of engineering education with the liberal arts and social sciences.

He has authored or co-authored hundreds of journal articles, essays and reports, and was editor-in-chief of the journal Environmental Engineering Science. He is the co-editor and chief contributor to the book Holistic Engineering Education: Beyond Technology (Springer 2010). He has also authored the book Hazardous Waste Site Remediation (Routledge 1993) and co-edited the book Hazardous Waste Management (UNESCO-ELOSS 2009).

Grasso has held a variety of distinguished posts in the environmental engineering and science fields, including fellow on the NATO Committee on the Challenges of Modern Society, technical expert to the United Nations Industrial Development Organization, vice chair of the Science Advisory Board for the United States Environmental Protection Agency and president of the AEESP.

Grasso, a member of a World Bank-funded international team that started the first environmental engineering program in Argentina, also chaired the National Academies of Sciences, Engineering, and Medicine committee that authored Environmental Engineering for the 21st Century: Addressing Grand Challenges and testified before the Congress of the Republic of Peru on sustainable development in Latin America.

== Honors and awards ==
Among the honors and awards received by Grasso are the AWWA National Doctoral Dissertation Award; being elected Fellow of the Association of Environmental Engineering and Science Professors; the Association for Environmental Health and Sciences Foundation Career Achievement Award; the John Cabot University Education Excellence Award; the Robert H. Goddard Alumni Award for Outstanding Professional Achievement, WPI; the Water Environment Federation Disinfection Pioneer Award.

== Personal life ==
Grasso is married to Susan Jean Grasso, Ph.D (née Hull), a College of Engineering, University of Michigan and Biden School of Public Policy, University of Delaware alumna. They have four children, Benjamin, Jacob, Elspeth and Caitlin.
