= Harlan Hatcher =

American academic administrator (1898–1998)

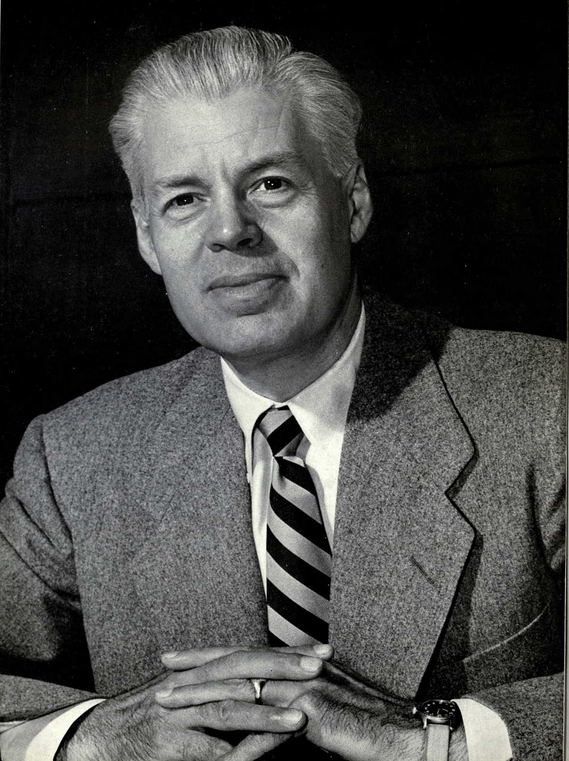
- Hatcher c. 1962

8th President of the University of Michigan
- In office 1951–1967
- Preceded by: Alexander G. Ruthven
- Succeeded by: Robben Wright Fleming

Personal details
- Born: September 9, 1898 Ironton, Ohio
- Died: February 25, 1998 (aged 99) Ann Arbor, Michigan
- Education: Ohio State University (BA, MA, PhD)
- Profession: Professor of American Literature, University President

Harlan Henthorne Hatcher (September 9, 1898 – February 25, 1998) was an American professor of literature who served as the eighth president of University of Michigan from 1951 to 1967, during the Civil rights movement and protests against the Vietnam War. His administration oversaw the establishment of the university's two branches, Flint Senior College and the Dearborn Center, both of which have since evolved into fully accredited universities. He began the implementation of affirmative action policies at the university in 1963.

== Early life ==
Hatcher was born on September 9, 1898, in Ironton, Ohio. He received bachelor's, master's and doctoral degrees from Ohio State University, specializing in American literature. He did postgraduate work at the University of Chicago and in 1928 traveled throughout Europe to study Renaissance literature.

== Early career ==
He worked as a professor of American literature at Ohio State University, then as the dean of the College of Arts and Sciences at Ohio State in 1944, and as vice president in 1948. He wrote three novels and several academic volumes.

== President of the University of Michigan ==
In 1951, Hatcher became the eighth President of the University of Michigan. He led the post-war expansion of the university, overseeing the construction of the North Campus. He established Flint Senior College and the Dearborn Center with funding from the state's auto industry, which later developed into branch campuses. He stepped down in 1967. In 1968, the university voted to rename the General Library to the Hatcher Graduate Library in honor of President Hatcher.

=== Mccarthyism ===
In 1954, Hatcher condoned the hearings of the House Un-American Activities Committee and fired two faculty members for suspicions of Communism.

== Bibliography ==
- Tunnel Hill (Bobbs-Merrill, 1931)
- Patterns of Wolfpen (Johns Creek, Pike County, Kentucky) (Bobbs Merrill, 1934)
- Creating the Modern American Novel (1935)
- The Buckeye Country: A Pageant of Ohio (1940)
- The Ohio Guide (1940, editor)
- Modern American Dramas (1941)
- "The Great Lakes" (Oxford University Press, 1944)
- Lake Erie (1945)
- A Century of Iron and Men (1950)
- A Modern Repertory (1953)
- Johnny Appleseed: A Voice in the Wilderness, The Story of the Pioneer John Chapman (1953)
- A Pictorial History of the Great Lakes (1963)
- Versification of Robert Browning (1969)
- The Western Reserve: The Story of New Connecticut in Ohio

Academic offices
Preceded by Alexander Grant Ruthven	8th President of the University of Michigan; 1951–1968	Succeeded by Robben Wright Fleming
