= Black Action Movement =

The Black Action Movement was a series of protests by African American students against the policies and actions of the University of Michigan. The protests themselves took place on three occasions in 1970, 1975, and 1987 (BAM I, BAM II, BAM III). Many student organizations participated in the movement, which has been called one of the most challenging for administrators in the school's history. Alan Glenn of the Ann Arbor Chronicle said of the 1970 protests that "the BAM strike became one of the few protests of that era in which the students could make a valid claim of victory."

== First protest ==
After the Assassination of Martin Luther King Jr. in 1968, students protested against the University of Michigan administration for lack of support for minorities on campus. The university agreed to certain concessions and to increase integration on campus. The 1970 Black Action Movement protests first began in late 1969, when black student organizations began to chafe at the slow progress of this proposed integration. Following their decision to become more proactive, the Black Student Union, Black Law Student Alliance, Black Psychologist, and the Black Educational Caucus among others entered into talks with university administrators. Accepting an invitation to dine and discuss with the university president in February 1970, the groups staged a demonstration on his lawn and demanded that by the beginning of the 1973–1974 school year, the balance of African American students and administrators proportionately reflect the 10% balance in the state at the time. Other requests were for better support for minority students, including a recruiter for Chicano students and a Black Student Center, financial support by way of extra grants and scholarships, and the establishment of a Black studies program.

The campaign closed the University of Michigan for 18 days through strikes, protests, picketing, blocking of buildings and streets, and interruption and shutting down of classes. During the last week of the strike, attendance of classes in the College of Literature, Science, and the Arts (LSA) dropped by 75%. The settlement reached on 1 April 1970 involved the university accepting the 10% figure as a goal. In a speech later that month, U.S. Vice President Spiro Agnew criticized university president Robben Fleming for his "surrender" to the students, calling the university's settlement a "callow retreat from reality."

== Second protest ==
The 1975 Black Action Movement protests were brought about for a few reasons. One of these was the lack of progress by the university in implementing the demands of the first movement. Another reason was the expulsion of a black nursing student, for preparing a patient's insulin shot, who was not allowed an expulsion hearing. The final reason was the university's rejection of a Regent-approved candidate for deanship in the College of Literature, Science, and the Arts. While almost 300 students occupied the central administration building for three days in February 1975, the protests were considered milder than those of 1970. Led by a "coalition of Black, Chicano, Asian-American, and Native-American student group representatives," they presented six demands calling for representation of the Chicano, Asian American, and Native American communities as well as the reinstatement of the expelled Black nursing student. The occupiers elected to leave voluntarily after receiving word, from University of Michigan President Robben W. Fleming, that discussions/negotiations would take place the following week. Because the protesters were never asked to leave, allowing them freedom to protest, no one was arrested or received any penalty. While the administration building was being occupied, nearly 500 students from the Graduate Employers Organization (GEO) held rallies in support of the occupiers in the plaza outside of the Administration building.

== Third protest ==
The 1987 Black Action Movement arose after several incidents, including racist jokes that were broadcast during a show at the student-run radio station WJJX; the response of the university and Ann Arbor police departments to a fight on campus; the university housing's efforts to address racist flyers dispersed on campus; and concerns of the African American faculty over the "racial climate on campus".

In 1970, the university announced the goal of having 10 percent Black students to match that of the Black population of the state of Michigan. Black enrollment fluctuated between 4.9 and 7.7 percent before 1987, when percentage of Black students was 5.4. The university's vice president for Student Services stated that too few high-school graduates from large cities were academically qualified for admission. Additionally, the university provided the Black Student Union with an independent annual budget, created a position to monitor minority affairs at the university, and created an advisory committee including "representatives from Black faculty, student and administrators' organizations and members of the community" to monitor the progress made by the university.

== Legacy ==
In 2013 members of the University of Michigan's Black Student Union revived the Black Action Movement. The revival was prompted specifically by a Theta Xi fraternity party, whose invitation described the party as "World Star Hip Hop presents: Hood Ratchet Thursday". Outrage over the party's racist theme and complaints led to the cancellation of the party. It also fueled student to want to bring attention to the decreasing numbers in black student enrollment at the university as well as awareness of the treatment of those students. On Tuesday November 19, 2013, UofM's Black Student Union started the Twitter hashtag #BBUM, (Being Black at the University of Michigan), encouraging students to share their stories about the treatment of blacks at the predominantly white school. They had over 1,000 student responses. Despite black people making up only 4.1% of the freshman class at the time, the hashtag and stories garnered national attention.

On January 20, 2014, leaders of the Black Student Union at the University of Michigan held a rally during which they delivered the seven demands that they had for the university. The Black Student Union treasurer told the crowd that what brought him there was "the unfinished business of the first three fights of the Black Action Movements." The problems fought for remain unsolved 44 years after the initial protest began. Included in the Black Student Union demands were a new Trotter Multicultural Center in a more accessible location on Central Campus, better representation on campus for blacks, and more affordable housing options. The University President at the time, Mary Sue Coleman, responded to the demands by coming up with her own three-pronged approach, addressing some but not all of the demands raised.

On April 22, 2014, the Supreme court upheld the Michigan law banning affirmative action. With the shrinking percentages of black enrollment in Michigan University's' this ruling was seen by the University of Michigan Black Student Union and students across the state as a hindrance toward their goal of increasing Black enrollment. After the Supreme Court decision, the Black Student Union again met with some of the heads of University of Michigan in order to generate a plan to increase black student enrollment and outreach. The 2016 Freshman class profile showed that Black students made up only 5% of the class, half of what the percentage the BAM fought for in the late 1960s, 1970s, and 1980s.

On September 26, 2016, posters were found around the school with anti-black messages. Following a week of protests, racist and homophobic posters were again found around the university campus. As a result, University of Michigan President Mark Schlissel, along with fellow students and faculty in October, 2016 generated a new Diversity, Equity, and Inclusion Plan, which aims to outline steps toward creating a more diverse and inclusive campus. However, in February 2017 racist emails were sent by a hacker to all students in the College of Engineering. They included vulgar racist language and phrases such as "Heil Trump". This incident and the lack of response from administrators prompted the student organization Students4Justice (S4J) to occupy the Michigan Union until administrators met their demands, which included meeting with students, improving the bias incident reporting protocol, fulfilling the remaining demands of the #BBUM movement, such as affordable campus housing and increasing Black enrollment to 10%, and creating an activist space on campus for students of color to organize for social justice. This activist space would be modeled after an earlier building discontinued by the university called the Ella Baker - Nelson Mandela Center for Anti-Racist Education. The University of Michigan administration responded to the demands of S4J with a 35-page report and has agreed to hold private meetings with leaders of the group to negotiate further on the demands.

== See also ==
- Black Student Movement (University of North Carolina)
