= Henry Philip Tappan =

American academic administrator

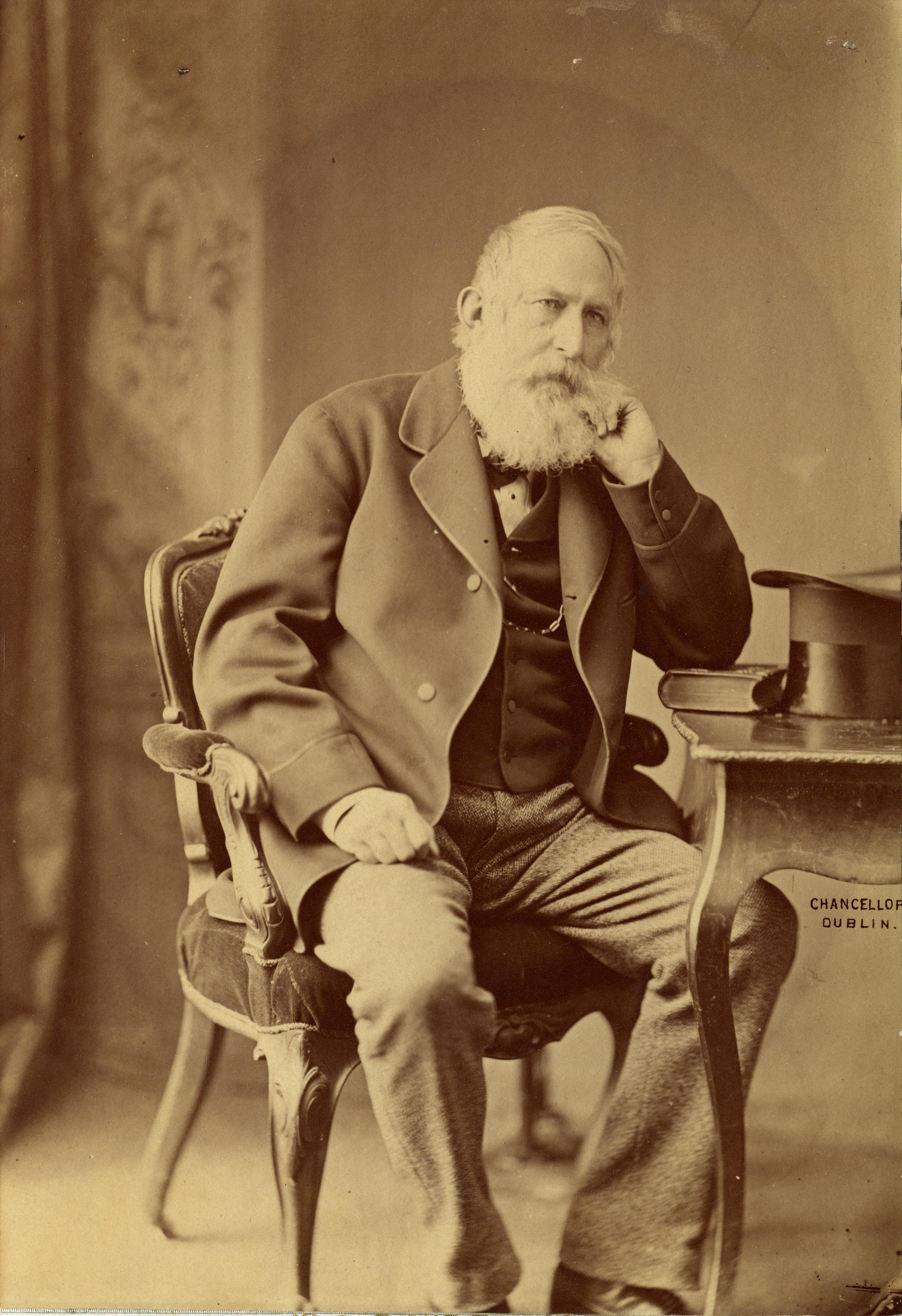

1st President of the University of Michigan
- In office 1852–1863
- Preceded by: Office reestablished, previously held by John Monteith
- Succeeded by: Erastus Otis Haven

Personal details
- Born: April 18, 1805 Rhinebeck, New York, U. S.
- Died: November 15, 1881 (aged 76) Vevey, Switzerland
- Spouse: Julia Livingston
- Children: 2
- Education: Union College
- Profession: Philosopher, University President

Henry Philip Tappan (April 18, 1805 – November 15, 1881) was an American philosopher, educator and academic administrator. In August 1852, he assumed the newly created presidency of the restructured University of Michigan, an office established by the Constitution of the State of Michigan in 1850.

A pioneer in the transformation of American university curricula, he was instrumental in fashioning the University of Michigan as a prototype for future universities across the United States, and has been called the "John the Baptist of the age of the American university." However, his academic career was ultimately cut short due to his impartial stance on religion and personality clashes with the university regents and certain faculty members, leading him to spend the remainder of his life in self-imposed exile in Europe.

== Early life ==
Henry Philip Tappan was born on April 18, 1805, in the village of Rhinebeck, New York. His father was of Prussian descent and Dutch descent, and his mother of Dutch descent. He was the great-grandson of Revolutionary war patriot Major Christopher Tappen.

Tappan attended Union College and studied under its president, Eliphalet Nott, graduating with Phi Beta Kappa honors in 1825. He graduated from Auburn Theological Seminary two years later and planned a career in ministry. He married Julia Livingston on April 7, 1828.

== Early career ==
He became associate pastor at the Dutch Reformed church in Schenectady, New York for one year, and was then pastor at the Congregational church in Pittsfield, Massachusetts.

A throat affliction prompted him to leave for a trip to the West Indies, and upon his return he joined the faculty of the University of the City of New York as a professor of philosophy. In 1845, he was awarded a Doctor of Divinity (honorary) degree from Union College, followed by a Doctor of Laws (honorary) degree from Columbia College in 1854; both degrees were granted honoris causa. At a later date he was elected a corresponding member of the Institute of France.

== Philosophical writings ==
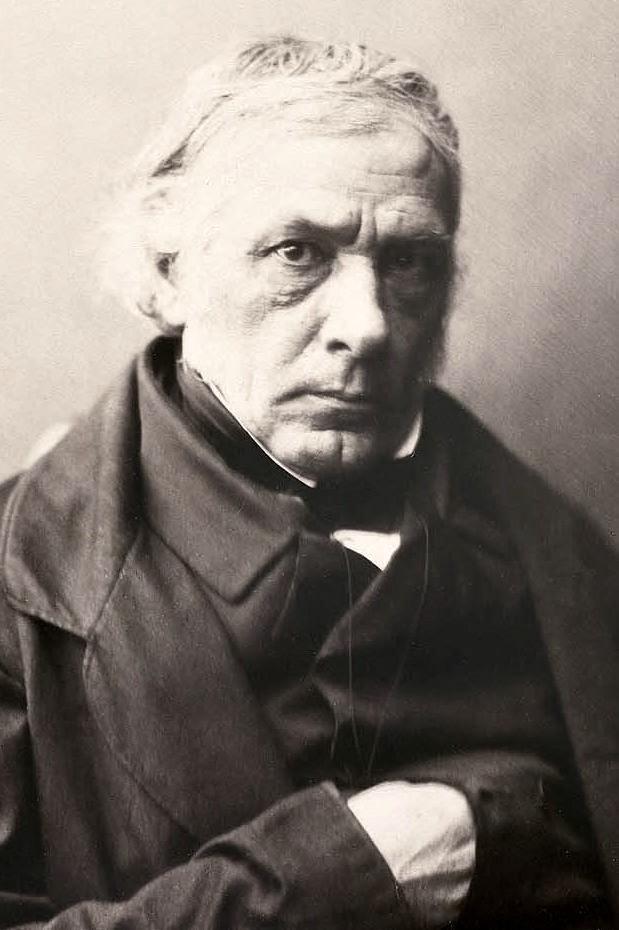
Victor Cousin, whom Tappan respected and whose precepts he followed, favorably commented on Tappan's works on free will

Tappan embarked on writing a series of philosophical treatises that began to influence thinking in Europe. He had already made a name for himself by his writings on the freedom of the will, including such works as Review of Edwards' Inquiry into the Freedom of the Will, The Doctrine of the Will Determined by an Appeal to Consciousness, The Doctrine of the Will Applied to Moral Agency and Responsibility, and The Elements of Logic. These works had called forth favorable comment from both European and American scholars, including Victor Cousin, whom Tappan respected and whose precepts he followed.

Isaac E. Crary and John Davis Pierce, the architects of Michigan's educational system, drew inspiration from the Prussian model of public instruction as detailed in Cousin's report. The Prussian system significantly influenced Michigan's educational plan before Tappan's administration, as evidenced by Francis W. Shearman's 1852 official state publication System of Public Instruction and Primary School Law of Michigan. Michigan's existing legislative and constitutional provisions, partly based on Prussian ideas, likely attracted Tappan to the office. In his reports and addresses, Tappan expanded on the foundational ideas established by John D. Pierce further developing the educational plan of the state.

Tappan shared Pierce's vision of a coordinated system of instruction, with a university at the apex and primary grades at the base. Through his observations of educational progress, Tappan concluded that the most effective approach to constructing such a system was to first establish the higher institution. He believed that as erudite administrators from this university gradually extended their influence, it would naturally lead to the creation and reinforcement of schools at lower levels, ultimately benefiting a broader population.

== President of the University of Michigan ==
[A university is] a collection of finished scholars in every department of human knowledge, associated for the purposes of advancing and communicating knowledge. To accomplish these purposes they gather around them books on all subjects without any limit, specimens of art, specimens of natural history, apparatus for illustrating the laws of nature, and for prying into her secrets; in fine, whatever may aid them in thought, investigation, and discovery, and in making known the results of their labors. Living together they aid and stimulate each other. They form a centre of light, and irradiate it far and wide for the glory of their country, and for the good of mankind. They create an atmosphere filled with inspirations to thought, research, and culture. Young men who have passed through the intermediate grade, and, hence, who have learned the art, and formed the habits of study, resort to them to hear their lectures, to breathe their spirit, to copy their example, and to submit themselves to their guidance.

— Henry Philip Tappan, wrote (President's Report, Univ. Mich. 1853-64, p. 654.)

In 1850, the state of Michigan adopted a new state constitution that created the office of President of the University of Michigan and directed the newly elected Board of Regents to select someone for the office. They sent a representative to the East to solicit recommendations, and George Bancroft recommended Henry Tappan. Despite this recommendation, the regents first elected Henry Barnard of Connecticut, who declined the offer. Although John Hiram Lathrop was also considered for the job following Barnard's refusal, Tappan was unanimously elected on August 12, 1852.

In 1852, Ann Arbor was home to a still young and undeveloped institution. The forty-acre campus featured two dormitory and recitation buildings known as North College and South College, a medical building, and four residences for professors. Both the faculty and student body were small at the time. The Department of Literature, Science, and the Arts had 6 professors and 57 students, while the Department of Medicine and Surgery had 5 professors and 157 students. Tappan, tasked with expanding the faculty, devised a plan for drawing scholars of reputation to the faculty. His guiding principle was that the chief factor for selecting a professor should be their qualifications for the position. Previously, when the university lacked a president, the Board of Regents aimed to maintain a balance among different Protestant denominations when appointing faculty members. To address vacancies that arose suddenly, Tappan chose young men, mainly university alumni, for assistant professorships. This approach allowed for postponing the appointment of full professors until suitable candidates were found.

Shortly after taking office, Tappan was approached by Henry N. Walker from Detroit, who inquired about supporting the university. Tappan suggested fundraising for an astronomical observatory, which led to the establishment of the Detroit Observatory. Walker donated money for the transit instrument, while Tappan arranged for high-quality instruments to be built in New York and Berlin. The transit instrument was acquired in Berlin with guidance from Johann Franz Encke and his assistant, Franz Brünnow. This connection proved beneficial when Tappan later recommended Brünnow as the observatory's director. Brünnow taught notable students, including James Craig Watson, and Tappan's daughter married him.

Tappan aimed to expand the library, original acquired by Asa Gray, and to increase the museum collections. He received support from professors, friends, and the citizens of Ann Arbor, along with funding from the Board of Regents for purchasing books. Concurrently, Henry Simmons Frieze contributed to the establishment of a fine arts museum. The university expanded library and museum spaces by abolishing the dormitory system and remodeling North and South College buildings, which had initially served dual purposes. This change, initiated in 1856, allowed North College to house the collections. In 1856, the country's first chemical laboratory was built on campus, specifically designed for chemistry education and offering extra space for classes and laboratories.

Before his appointment, the legislature arranged for the creation of a course or courses of study for students who prefer not to pursue the usual collegiate course embracing the ancient languages. Additional courses were introduced, including a new scientific course and a partial course for those interested in classical or scientific studies without pursuing a degree. Options in analytical and agricultural chemistry and civil engineering were available through the partial course. These changes allowed students to choose between a Bachelor of Arts, Bachelor of Science, or a degree in civil engineering. Tappan also established a so-called "university course" for graduate work, once the undergraduate curriculum was more fully developed. In 1855, Michigan became the second university in the country (after Harvard) to issue Bachelor of Science degrees.

Tappan sought to establish an agricultural course in the university, but, although some teaching was done, his efforts in this direction were not successful. In 1854, Reverend Charles Fox was appointed as Professor of Agriculture, but his sudden death later that year halted progress. Attempts to establish an agricultural farm in 1858 and 1859 also failed.

The Law School began operations in 1859 with professors James V. Campbell, Charles I. Walker, and Thomas M. Cooley. In 1862, a dedicated law building was constructed to house the Department of Law and its libraries. A chair for military engineering and tactics was established, but no qualified candidates could be found due to the demand for military officers during the Civil War.

=== Removal as president ===
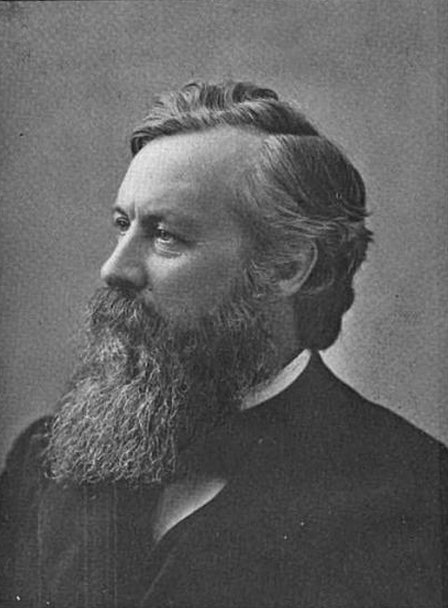
Alexander Winchell, a rival of Tappan, instigated resolutions at the 1857 Detroit Conference of the Methodist Episcopal Church in Port Huron that criticized the moral state of the university under Tappan

Tappan's 11-year presidency was characterized by considerable tension, partly due to his challenging personality traits. His attempts to secularize faculty appointments and his impartial stance on religion faced backlash during a time of heightened religious fervor.

In September 1857, during the Detroit Conference of the Methodist Episcopal Church held in Port Huron, resolutions were presented condemning the moral condition at the university. It is evident from an extract from his diary that these resolutions were at least partly instigated by Tappan's rival, Alexander Winchell. These resolutions were partly driven by strong sectarian opposition to the university throughout the state. This opposition naturally arose from the efforts of various religious groups to maintain their denominational colleges, which competed with the university. Since the university's early days in Ann Arbor, sectarian opposition posed a significant threat. The widespread antagonism inevitably influenced the legislature, preventing Tappan from securing the financial support he sought. The internal faculty struggles and petty criticisms throughout the state indicate some of the forces that were undermining the university's apparent prosperity during the period from 1852 to 1858.

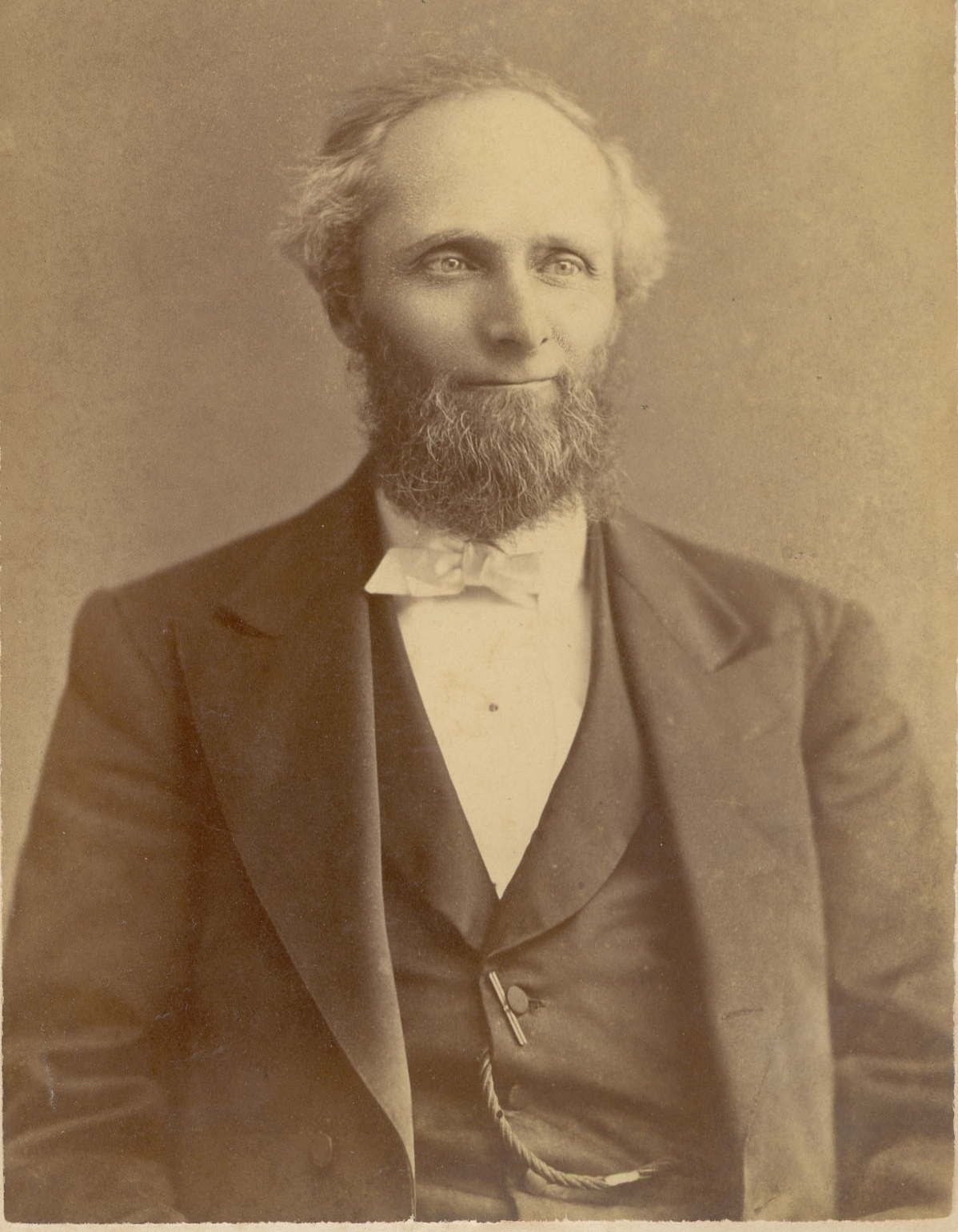
Erastus Otis Haven, an ally of Tappan's rival Alexander Winchell, replaced Tappan as President of University of Michigan in 1863, shortly after Brünnow's departure

In 1863, the regents voted unanimously to remove Tappan from office and replace him with Erastus Otis Haven, after which the regents also fired Tappan's son John as university librarian.

Upon his removal, Tappan remarked, "This matter belongs to history; the pen of history is held by Almighty Justice, and I fear not the record it will make of my conduct, whether public or private, in relation to the affairs of the University." He immediately left Michigan and moved his family to Europe, residing in Berlin, Paris, Bonn, Frankfurt, Basel, and Geneva.

Tappan's firing was unpopular with students and the broader community, as it came with no warning, at a time when the university was more successful than ever, for no wrongdoing other than personal friction with the regents, and from a board whose terms in office were all expiring (save one) in just a few months and who were due to be replaced with new regents (already elected) who had expressed a desire to form a better working relationship with Tappan. Henry Barnard, by then the editor of The American Journal of Education, called the dismissal an "act of savage, unmitigated barbarism" in light of Tappan's work being "without a precedent in the educational history of the country." At the suggestion of his supporters, Tappan himself wrote a lengthy response to his dismissal, generally praising the first Board of Regents and excoriating the second as incompetent, and also singling out certain faculty members for criticism. When the new Board of Regents took office in 1864, the flood of support for Tappan led them to consider re-hiring him, but in the end they felt it would be disruptive to the university, in light of Tappan's subsequent response.

== Later years ==
In 1874 and 1875 the Board of Regents passed resolutions commending Tappan's service to the university and inviting him to return to Ann Arbor to be honored; the latter expressly withdrew "any censure express or implied in the resolutions which severed his connection" to the university. Tappan, who had moved to Europe after his firing, expressed a desire to return, but twice deferred accepting the invitation, citing first his age and then the health of his daughter.

He never returned to Michigan and died in his villa in Vevey, Switzerland on November 15, 1881, where he is buried overlooking Lake Geneva.

== Commemoration ==
- The Tappan Professorship of Law was created in 1879, with former Michigan governor Alpheus Felch the first to hold it.
- Tappan Hall, the oldest extant classroom building on the University of Michigan campus, was finished in 1894. It houses the History of Art Department and the Fine Art Library. It also houses a bas relief of Tappan by Karl Bitter.
- Tappan Elementary School was built on East University Avenue, Ann Arbor, in 1885. It was sold to the University of Michigan in the 1920s and renamed East Hall.
- Tappan Junior High School was first opened in 1925 in the Burns Park area of Ann Arbor. The building was renamed Burns Park Elementary School after a new and larger junior Tappan Junior High School opened nearby in 1951. The new school is now known as Tappan Middle School and is located in East Stadium Boulevard, Ann Arbor.
- In 2024, the University of Michigan Board of Regents created the Henry Philip Tappan Collegiate Professorship in 2024, and named Ivo D. Dinov as Tappan Professor.

== Works ==
- Tappan, Henry P. (1839), A Review of Edwards's "Inquiry Into the Freedom of the Will.", New York: John S. Taylor, ISBN 0-404-59406-9
- Tappan, Henry P. (1840), The Doctrine of the Will, Determined by an Appeal to Consciousness, New York: Wiley and Putnam, ISBN 0-7905-2497-X
- Tappan, Henry P. (1841), The Doctrine of the Will, Applied to Moral Agency and Responsibility, Wiley and Putnam, ISBN 0-7905-0162-7
- Tappan, Henry P. (1844), Elements of Logic: Together with an Introductory View of Philosophy in General, and a Preliminary View of the Reason, New York: Wiley and Putnam
- Tappan, Henry P. (1851), University Education, New York: George P. Putnam, ISBN 0-8007-1258-7
- Tappan, Henry P. (1852a), A Discourse, Detroit: Advertiser Power Presses, ISBN 0-7619-5715-4 (Inaugural speech)
- Tappan, Henry P. (1852b), A Step from the New World to the Old, and Back Again: With Thoughts on the Good and Evil in Both, New York: D. Appleton
- Tappan, Henry P. (1855a), The Growth of Cities: A Discourse Delivered Before the New York Geographical Society, New York: R. Craighead
- Tappan, Henry P. (1855b), The Progress of Educational Development: A Discourse Delivered Before the Literary Societies of the University of Michigan, Ann Arbor, MI: E.B. Pond
- Tappan, Henry P. (1856), Elements of Logic: Together with an Introductory View of Philosophy in General, and a Preliminary View of the Reason (2nd (revised) ed.), New York: D. Appleton
- Tappan, Henry P. (1857), Public Education: An Address; Delivered in the Hall of the House of Representatives, in the Capitol at Lansing, Detroit: H. Barns, ISBN 9781418196820
- Tappan, Henry P. (1865), A discourse on the death of Abraham Lincoln ... delivered Tuesday, May 2, 1865, in the Dorotheen-Church, Berlin, Berlin: G. Lange, OCLC 3838520

== Notes ==
Academic offices
Vacant Office abolished in 1821 Title last held by Rev. John Monteith as President of the University of Michigania	1st President of the University of Michigan; 1852–1863	Succeeded by Erastus Otis Haven
