= Frecker =

Frecker is a surname. Notable people with the surname include:

- Artie Frecker (1901–1967), Australian rules footballer
- George Alain Frecker (1905–1979), Canadian politician and academic administrator, namesake of Institut Frecker in Saint Pierre and Miquelon
- Mary Frecker, American mechanical engineer
- R. Frecker, Australian Antarctic explorer, namesake of Frecker Ridge in Antarctica
- Shannie Duff (née Frecker, born 1936), Canadian politician
