= University of Michigan College of Engineering =

Engineering school of the University of Michigan

Coordinates: 42°17′32″N 83°42′50″W

- Other name: Michigan Engineering
- Type: Public engineering school
- Established: 1837; 189 years ago
- Parent institution: University of Michigan
- Endowment: $807.6 million
- Dean: Karen Thole
- Faculty: 579
- Students: 9,682
- Undergraduates: 6,351
- Postgraduates: 3,331
- Location: Ann Arbor, Michigan
- Campus: 800 acres (3.25 km^{2})
- Website: engin.umich.edu

The University of Michigan College of Engineering (branded as Michigan Engineering) is the engineering school of the University of Michigan, a public research university in Ann Arbor, Michigan. It was founded in 1837.

== History ==
The college was founded in 1837 with courses in civil engineering. Since its founding, the College of Engineering established some of the earliest programs in various fields such as data science, computer science, electrical engineering, and nuclear engineering. The college's aerospace engineering program celebrated its 100th anniversary in 2014. The Materials Science and Engineering program is the oldest continuing metallurgy and materials program in the United States. In 2021, it founded the first robotics department among the top 10 engineering schools in the United States.

The college was first located on the University's Central Campus before moving to the University's North Campus — which occupies approximately 800 acres (3.25 km^{2}) — starting in the late 1940s. Today, the College of Engineering is prominently located in the center of the University's North Campus (the Marine Hydrodynamics Laboratory is located on Central Campus), which is shared with the School of Music, Theatre and Dance, the School of Art and Design, and the Taubman College of Architecture and Urban Planning. The North Campus also houses Lurie Tower, one of 2 grand carillons on the Ann Arbor campus, and one of only 23 in the world.

=== List of deans ===
No.	Name	Service year	Length (Approx.)	Field of study
1	Charles Ezra Greene	1895–1903	8 years	Civil
2	Mortimer Elwyn Cooley	1903–1928	25 years	Mechanical
acting	George W. Patterson	1927–1928	1 year	Electrical
3	Herbert Charles Sadler	1928–1937	9 years	Marine
4	Henry C. Anderson	1937–1939	2 years	Mechanical
5	Ivan C. Crawford	1940–1951	11 years	Water
6	George Granger Brown	1951–1957	6 years	Chemical
7	Stephen Stanley Attwood	1957–1965	8 years	Electrical
8	Gordon Van Wylen	1965–1972	7 years	Physics
9	David V. Ragone	1972–1980	8 years	Metallurgical
acting	Hansford W. Farris	1980–1981	1 year	Electrical
10	James J. Duderstadt	1981–1986	5 years	Nuclear
11	Charles M. Vest	1986–1989	3 years	Mechanical
interim	Daniel E. Atkins III	1989–1990	1 year	Computer
12	Peter M. Banks	1990–1996	6 years	Climate and Space
13	Stephen W. Director	1996–2005	9 years	Electrical
14	David C. Munson Jr.	2006–2016	10 years	Electrical
15	Alec Gallimore	2016–2023	7 years	Aerospace
interim	Steven L. Ceccio	2023–2024	1 year	Mechanical
16	Karen Thole	2024–2026	2 years	Mechanical
17	Mingyan Liu	2026–present	incumbent	Electrical

== Departments ==
The University of Michigan College of Engineering has the following academic departments:

- Department of Aerospace Engineering (AERO)
- Department of Biomedical Engineering (BME; with the Medical School)
- Department of Chemical Engineering (CHE)
- Department of Civil and Environmental Engineering (CEE)
- Department of Climate and Space Sciences and Engineering (CLASP)
- Department of Electrical Engineering and Computer Science (EECS)
  - Computer Science and Engineering Division (CSE)
  - Electrical and Computer Engineering Division (ECE)
- Department of Industrial and Operations Engineering (IOE)
- Department of Materials Science and Engineering (MSE)
- Department of Mechanical Engineering (ME)
- Department of Naval Architecture and Marine Engineering (NAME)
- Department of Nuclear Engineering and Radiological Sciences (NERS)
- Department of Robotics

== Academic programs ==
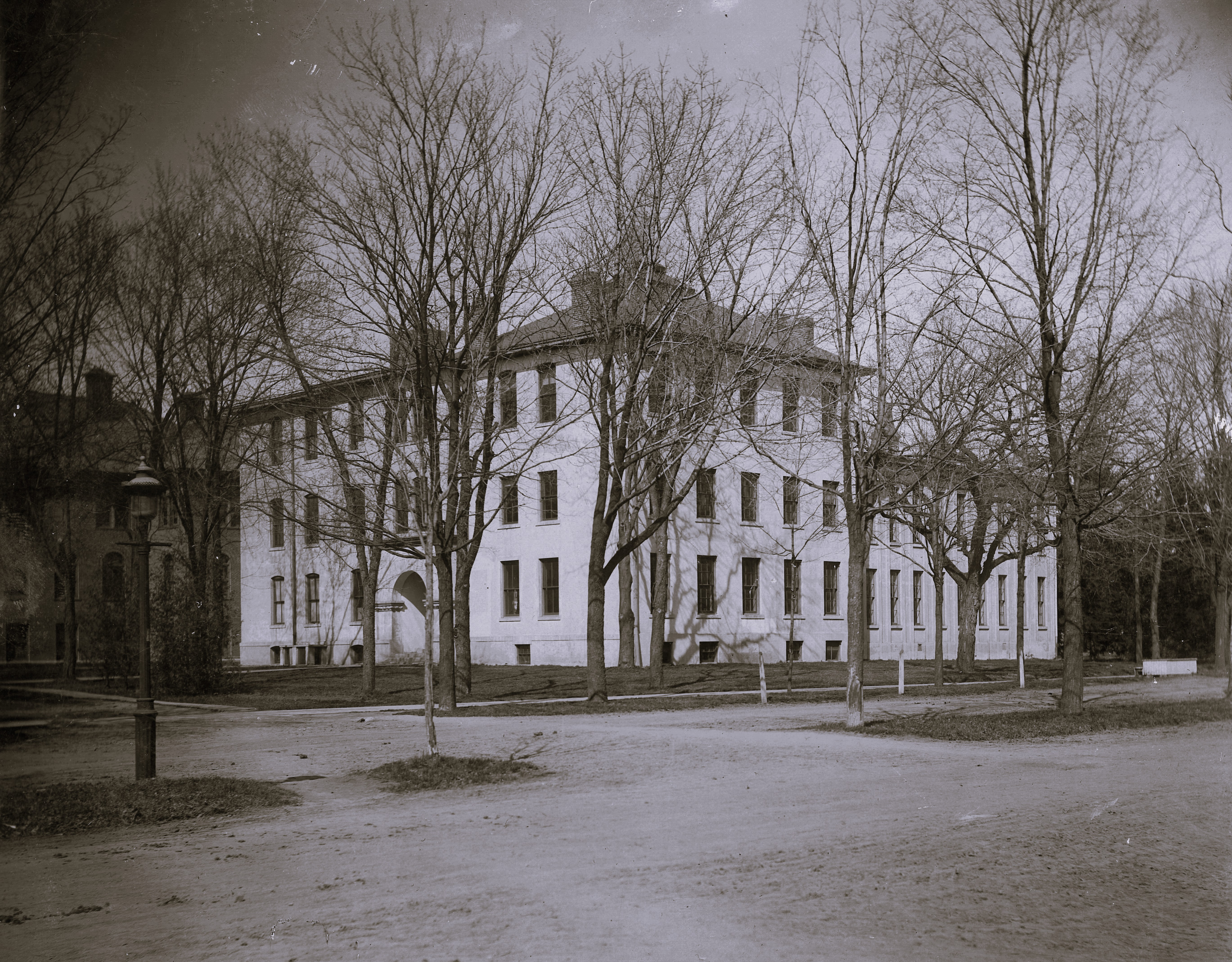
The original Engineering Building on The Diag, built in 1839, was also known as the Southeast Professors' House. It was used by the Engineering School from 1892 to 1922.

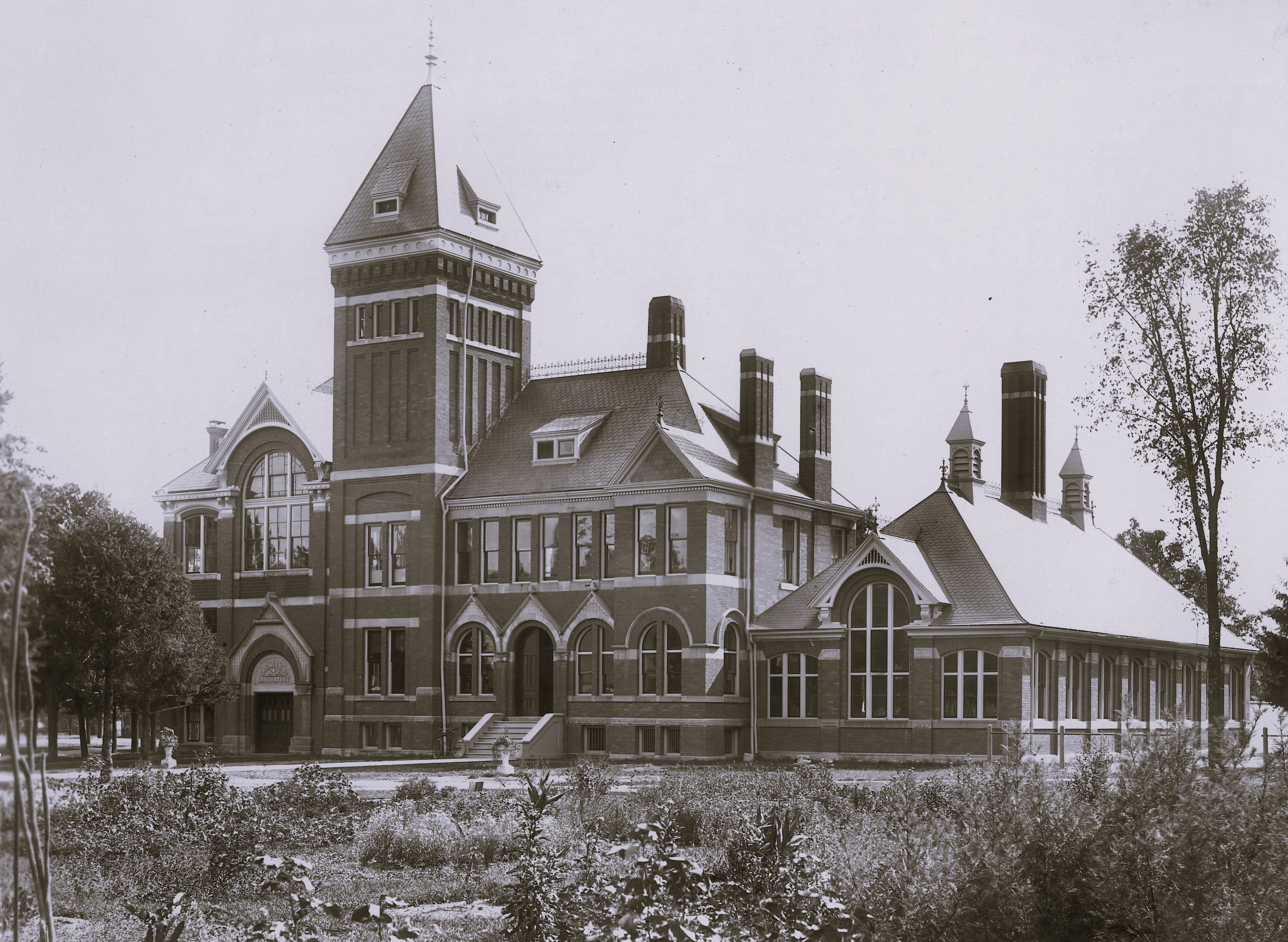
The Engineering Shops on The Diag, built in 1885

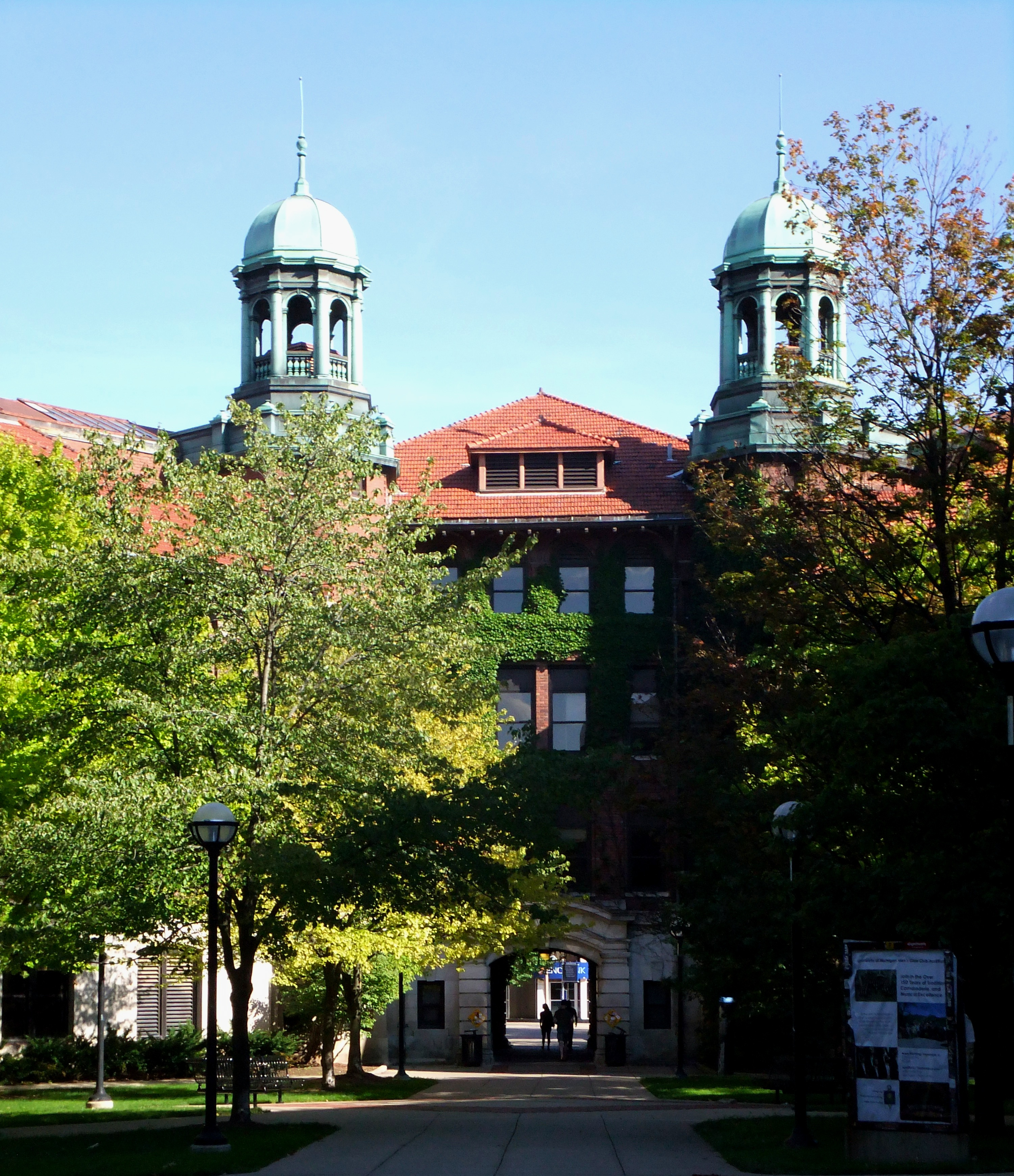
West Hall (West Engineering Building) on The Diag

The college grants degrees at bachelor's, master's, and PhD levels. The undergraduate degree programs offered by the College of Engineering are:

- Aerospace Engineering
- Biomedical Engineering
- Chemical Engineering
- Civil Engineering
- Climate and Meteorology
- Computer Engineering
- Computer Science
- Data Science
- Electrical Engineering
- Engineering Physics
- Environmental Engineering
- Industrial and Operations Engineering
- Materials Science and Engineering
- Mechanical Engineering
- Naval Architecture and Marine Engineering
- Nuclear Engineering and Radiological Sciences
- Robotics
- Space Science and Engineering

College-wide programs, which offer specialized courses or instruction, include:

- Applied Physics
- Engineering Education Research
- Macromolecular Science & Engineering
- Tauber Institute for Global Operations
- Transportation Research Institute

== Laboratories and facilities ==
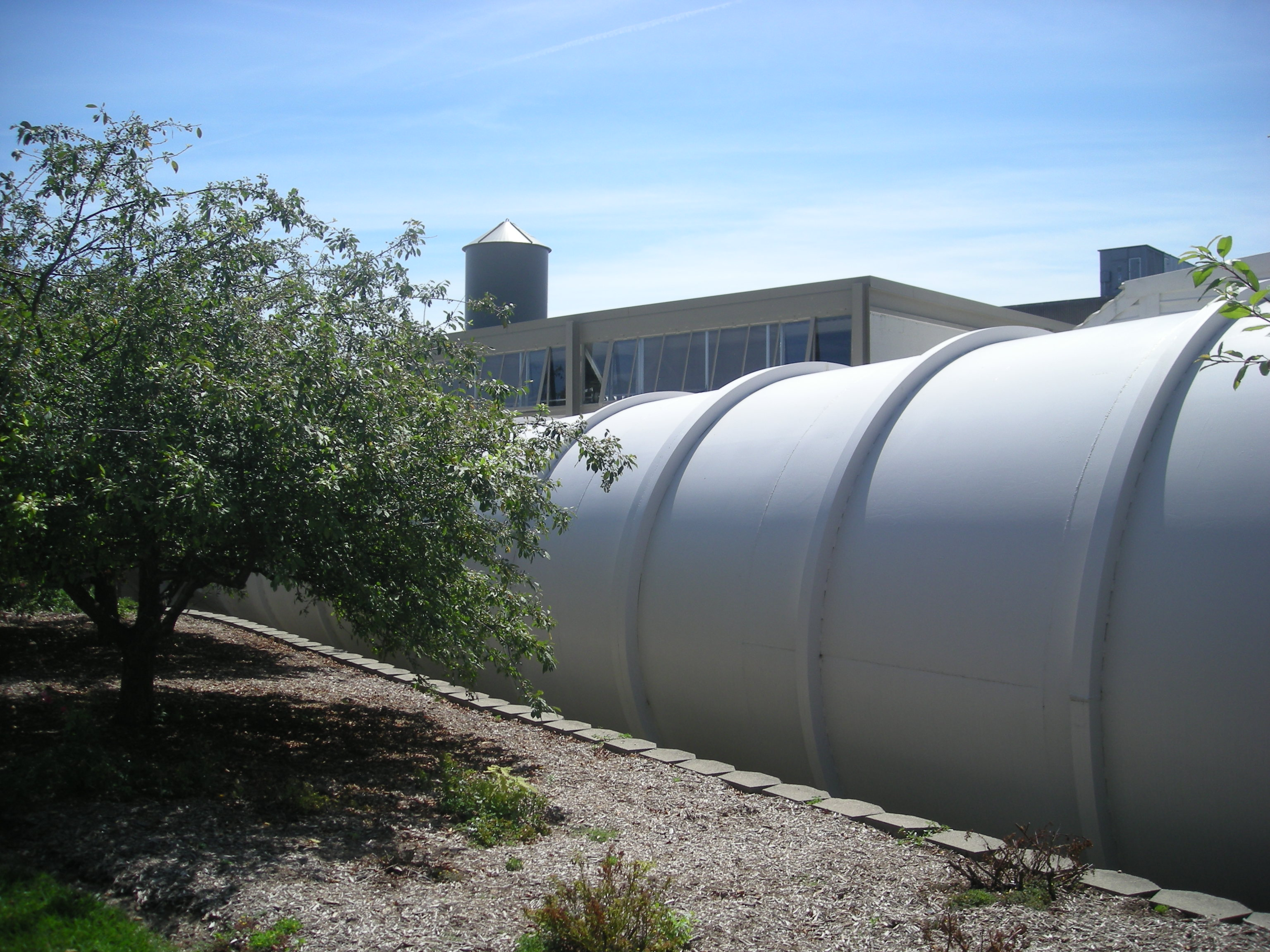
The Wind Tunnel Labs on the north campus

Various laboratories are located at the college of engineering, including the Center for Wireless Integrated MicroSystems (WIMS) and the Center for Reconfigurable Manufacturing Systems (RMS), both of which are NSF laboratories. Another major laboratory is the Center for Ultra-Fast Optical Sciences. The Phoenix Memorial Laboratory is a laboratory dedicated to research into the peaceful use of nuclear technology. It once housed the Ford Nuclear Reactor, which was decommissioned in 2003.

The College of Engineering also has 11 wind tunnels, electron microscope and ion beam laboratories, a civil engineering test facility, and solid state manufacturing facilities. Various laboratories dedicated to automotive engineering, neutron science, optical sciences, and robotics are scattered throughout the college. A hydrodynamics laboratory is located on the University's Central Campus. An office of the Weather Underground is located at the College of Engineering.

The Duderstadt Center, formerly the Media Union and affectionately known as "The Dude" by engineering students, is named after former University president and nuclear engineering professor James Duderstadt. It houses the Art, Architecture & Engineering Library and also contains computer clusters, audio and video editing laboratories, galleries, and studios, as well as usability and various digital media laboratories, including virtual reality. The Millennium Project, which focuses on the future of the university learning environment, is also housed in the Duderstadt Center.

Computer services and networking is provided by the Computer-Aided Engineering Network, more commonly known as CAEN. CAEN operates various computer laboratories throughout the College of Engineering facilities and the university campus.

The University of Michigan, partnering with the Michigan Department of Transportation, opened a 32-acre proving ground test course for autonomous cars in 2015. The course, called Mcity, was built on the site of a former Pfizer facility, which the University purchased in 2009. Mcity contains five miles of roads and includes a mock town square, tunnel, highway exit ramps, a railroad crossing, gravel roadway, traffic circle, roundabout, and other obstacles. Faculty and engineering students utilize Mcity to work on projects and collaborate with automakers and suppliers who test vehicle technology at the course.

In 2019 professors Elliot Soloway and Cathie Norris founded the University of Michigan Center for Digital Curricula under the auspices of the University of Michigan College of Engineering for the purposes of building fully digital open curricula. This curricula is primarily designed to be delivered using the Collabrify Roadmaps software platform developed by the Norris and Soloway in the mid 2010s.

== Rankings ==
The College of Engineering is ranked No. 7 in the United States by U.S. News & World Report in its 2021 publication.

== Honor Code ==
College of Engineering's student Honor Code differs from other University of Michigan academic units in that it allows unproctored exams.

== Student organizations ==
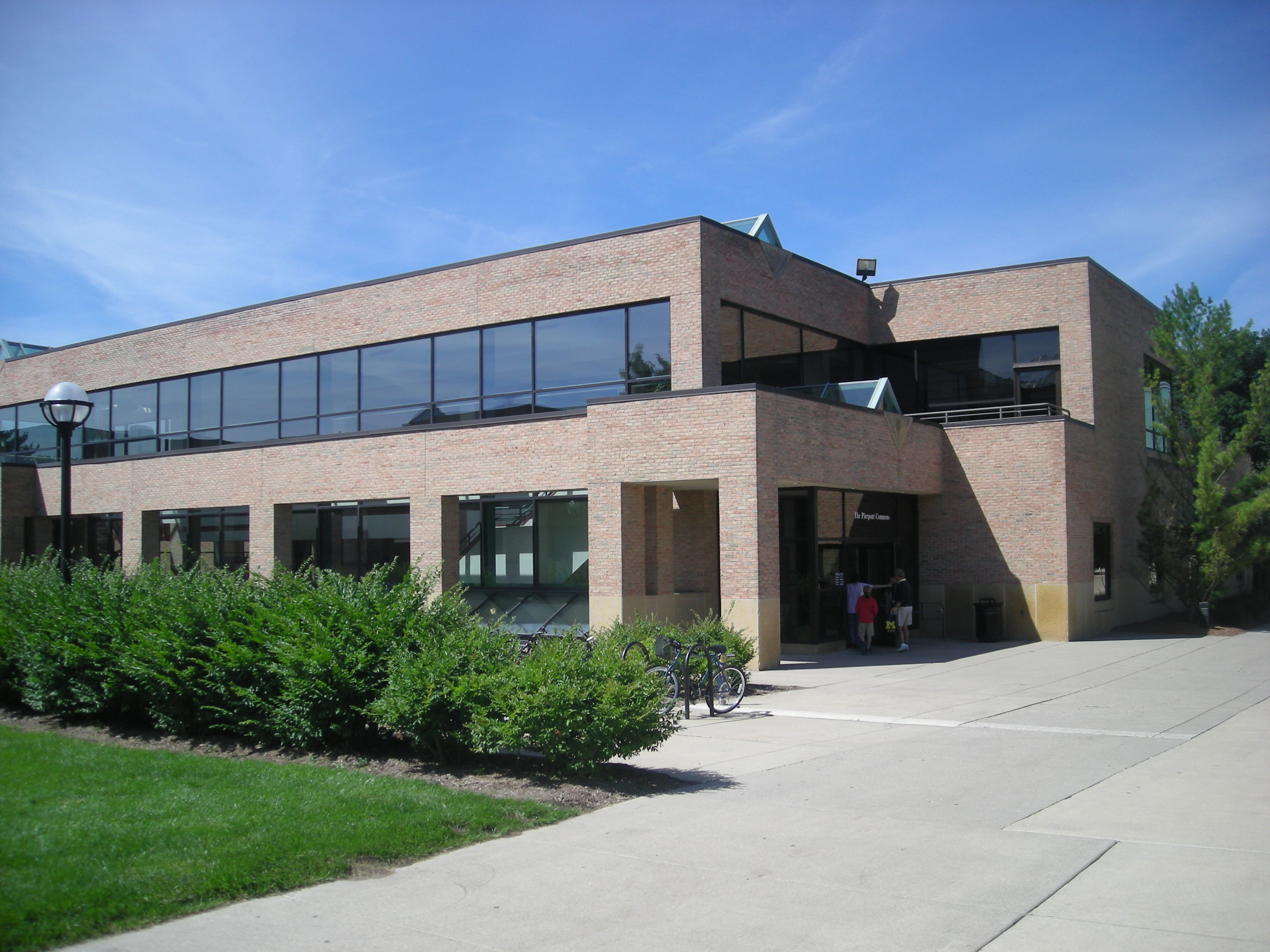
Pierpont Commons in 2013

There are student branches of various professional organizations such as AIAA, IEEE and ASME, minority groups such as SWE, NSBE and oStem as well as honor societies such as Tau Beta Pi and Epeians, the Engineering Leadership Honor Society at Michigan. Most are housed in Pierpont Commons (the student union on North Campus) or in "The Bullpen" in the Electrical Engineering and Computer Science (EECS) building. Engineering Student Government (ESG), represents the student body of the College of Engineering, also has an office in the EECS building.

Many multidisciplinary engineering project teams are primarily housed in the Wilson Student Project Center. Several major project teams include:

- University of Michigan Electric Boat
- Michigan Health Engineered for All Lives (M-HEAL)
- BLUELab
- Baja SAE Team
- Concrete Canoe
- MRacing Team - Formula SAE
- Michigan Electric Racing Team (Combined with M-Racing in 2021)
- Michigan Mars Rover Team
- Michigan Robotic Submarine
- Steel Bridge
- Engineering Global Leadership Honors Program (EGL)
- University of Michigan Solar Car Team
- Michigan Aeronautical Science Association
- University of Michigan Supermileage Team - Shell Eco-Marathon
- MFly
- UM::Autonomy
- Human Powered Submarine
- Human Powered Helicopter

In 2006, the UM Human Powered Submarine Team won the International Submarine Races. Radio Aurora Explorer, a University of Michigan designed and fabricated Cubesat, is the first National Science Foundation sponsored CubeSat mission.

== Recurring events ==
Tech Day is an event held by the college each fall inviting prospective high school students and their parents, as well as prospective college transfer students, to explore Michigan Engineering.

The SWE/TBP Career Fair is an engineering career fair held each fall as a collaboration between the University of Michigan Student Section of the Society of Women Engineers and the Michigan Gamma chapter of Tau Beta Pi. The event began in 1986 and has grown to be one of the largest student-run career fairs in the country, hosting nearly 300 companies each year.

The Engineering Research Symposium is a one-day event that began in 2006 and features student research from the undergraduate through PhD levels, including poster presentations, scientific visualizations, and dissertation work in department-nominated oral and poster presentations.

== See also ==
- Engineering
- Glossary of engineering
- List of University of Michigan people – people associated with the college are marked with COE
