= Mingyan Liu =

Chinese-American electrical engineer

- 刘鸣雁

17th Dean of the University of Michigan College of Engineering
- Incumbent
- Assumed office May 15, 2026
- Preceded by: Karen Thole

Personal details
- Born: September 1972 (age 54)
- Citizenship: United States
- Spouse: Manish Karir
- Children: 2
- Education: Nanjing University of Aeronautics and Astronautics (BS); University of Maryland (MS, PhD)
- Website: liu.engin.umich.edu
- Scientific career
- Fields: Electrical and computer engineering
- Workplaces: University of Michigan
- Thesis: Network Performance Modeling, Design and Dimensioning Methodologies
- Doctoral advisor: John Baras

Mingyan Liu (Chinese: 刘鸣雁; pinyin: Liú Míngyàn) is the Robert J. Vlasic Dean of Engineering at the University of Michigan, Ann Arbor. She is the seventeenth dean of the University of Michigan College of Engineering. Liu is also the T. C. Chang Professor of Engineering and Professor of Electrical Engineering and Computer Science at the University of Michigan.

Liu has been a member of University of Michigan's faculty since 2000. Prior to starting her term as the Dean of the College of Engineering, Liu served as the associate dean for academic affairs from June 2023 to May 2026 and as the Peter and Evelyn Fuss Chair of the Electrical and Computer Engineering Department from September 2018 to May 2023.

Liu is an internationally recognized researcher in the areas of sequential decision and learning theory, game theory, incentive design, and optimal resource allocation. Her most recent research is focused on modeling and mining of large scale Internet measurement data and the development of incentive mechanisms for enhancing cyber security.

== Biography ==
Liu completed her high school education at Nanjing Foreign Language School in Nanjing, Jiangsu, China, in 1991.

She received a bachelor's degree with a major in electrical engineering from the Nanjing University of Aeronautics and Astronautics in 1995. She received a Master of Science in systems engineering in 1997 and a Doctor of Philosophy in electrical and computer engineering in 2000 from the University of Maryland, College Park.

Liu lives in Ann Arbor, MI with her husband and children.

=== University of Michigan ===
After receiving her doctorate, Liu joined the faculty of the University of Michigan College of Engineering as an assistant professor in 2000. She was appointed as an associate professor in September 2006 and as a full professor in September 2012.

Liu co-founded the start-up company QuadMetrics, Inc., in 2014 to commercialize technology developed at the University of Michigan for predictive data analytics in cybersecurity. The company offered a pair of services to help companies assess the effectiveness of their security and decide the best way to allocate their security budget. QuadMetrics, Inc. was designated a Gartner Cool Vendor in Risk Management for 2016 and acquired by the analytics software firm Fair Isaac (FICO) in May 2016.

Liu served as the chair of Electrical and Computer Engineering (ECE) Division at the EECS Department from September 2018 to May 2023, where she oversaw faculty recruitment and advancement, program growth, and academic planning. After that, she served as the associate dean for academic affairs of the College of Engineering from June 2023 to May 2026. In this role, she led policy development, faculty review equity efforts, and initiatives to supprot teaching faculty and mid-career coaching.

On April 28, 2026, Liu was appointed as the 17th dean of the College of Engineering, effective May 15, 2026, with her three-year term set to expire on July 31, 2029.

== Academic research ==
Liu's research is in the fields of optimal resource allocation, sequential decision and learning theory, game theory, and incentive mechanisms. She applies these methods to large-scale networked systems, cybersecurity, and cyber-risk quantification. Her early work focused on wireless, mobile ad hoc, and sensor networks. It addressed resource allocation, performance modeling, and energy efficiency.

Liu's most recent works use Internet-scale measurements and machine learning to study cybersecurity risk. A 2014 paper found a statistically significant correlation between network mismanagement and malicious activity. A 2015 study used 258 externally observable network features to forecast reported security incidents.

She is also a leader in proposing the use of cyber insurance as an incentive mechanism. Her 2021 book, "Embracing Risk: Cyber Insurance as an Incentive Mechanism for Cybersecurity", argues for a shift from the conventional view of seeing insurance as a risk management tool towards its use for risk control and risk reduction by re-aligning cybersecurity incentives. It also covers interdependent risks, underwriting, and data-driven risk assessment.

== Awards and honors ==
Liu's research and academic leadership have been recognized by several awards and honors, including:

- 2002 NSF CAREER Award
- 2012 Best Paper Award at the IEEE/ACM International Conference on Information Processing in Sensor Networks (IPSN)
- 2014 IEEE Fellow, for contributions to modeling of wireless and ad-hoc sensor networks
- 2014 Best Application Paper Award at the IEEE/ACM International Conference on Data Science and Advanced Analytics (DSAA)
- 2016 "Crossing the Valley of Death" PI Excellence Award, United States Department of Homeland Security
- 2017 ECE Department Distinguished Alumni Award, University of Maryland, College Park
- 2026-2027 IEEE Communications Society Distinguished Lecturer

She has also received multiple awards and honors from the University of Michigan, including:

- 2003 Elizabeth C. Crosby Research Award
- 2011 EECS Department Outstanding Achievement Award
- 2014 Elizabeth C. Crosby Research Award
- 2015 College of Engineering Excellence in Education Award
- 2017 College of Engineering Monroe-Brown Foundation Service Excellence Award
- 2018 Distinguished University Innovator
- 2026 Rackham Graduate School Distinguished Graduate Mentoring Award
