= Nanjing University Town =

Areas of Nanjing, China

Nanjing has a total area of 6582.31 square kilometers and a population of about 9.3146 million. Local development and education and cultural industries coexist. Four university towns have begun to take shape in recent years. From north to south, they are Xianlin University Town in Qixia District, Pukou University Town in Pukou District, Jiangning University Town in Jiangning District and Lishui University Town in Lishui District.

== Xianlin University Town ==
Xianlin University Town is located at the northern end of Nanjing City. Construction started in January 2002, covering an area of about 80 square kilometers. The city is rich in educational resources and has convenient transportation for technology and medical care. Colleges such as Nanjing University Xianlin Campus, Nanjing Normal University Xianlin campus, Nanjing Industrial Vocational and Technical University are all located in Xianlin University Town. In 2020, some incentive measures be announced, and a scientific and technological innovation fund be established. It is hoped that the university will become functional, which is regarded as an important development center in Nanjing in the future.

== Pukou University Town ==
Pukou University Town, located in the northwest of Nanjing City, was established in September 1988. It is the earliest university town built in Nanjing. It includes Nanjing University of Technology, Nanjing Audit College, Nanjing Agricultural University, Jiangsu Second Normal College, Jiangsu Police Academy, and Nanjing University Jinling College, Southeast University Chengxian College.

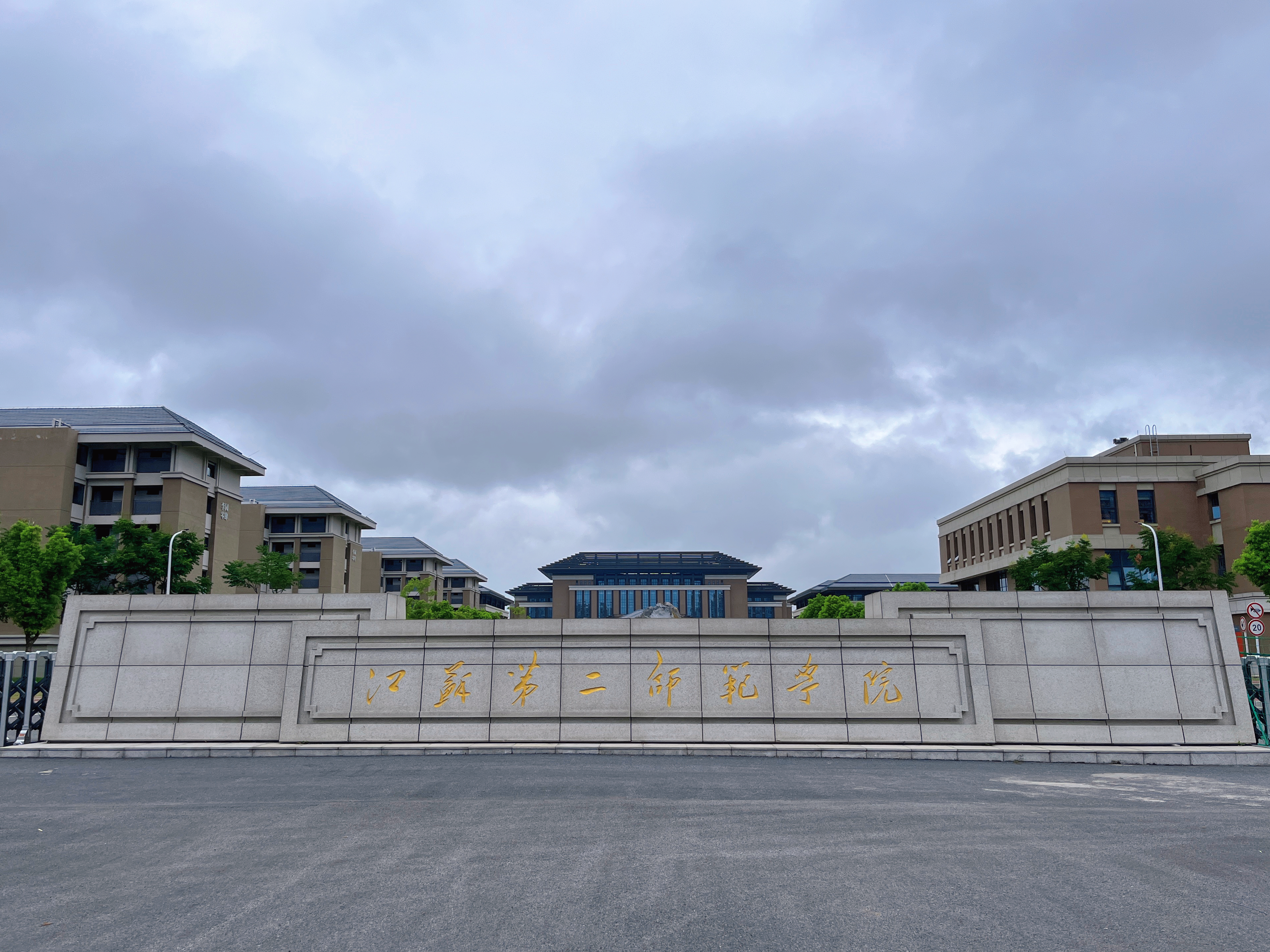
Jiangsu Second Normal College

== Jiangning University Town ==
Jiangning University Town is located in the south of the main city of Nanjing, with a planned area of 27 square kilometers. It included the largest number of universities in Nanjing, except Xianlin University Town.

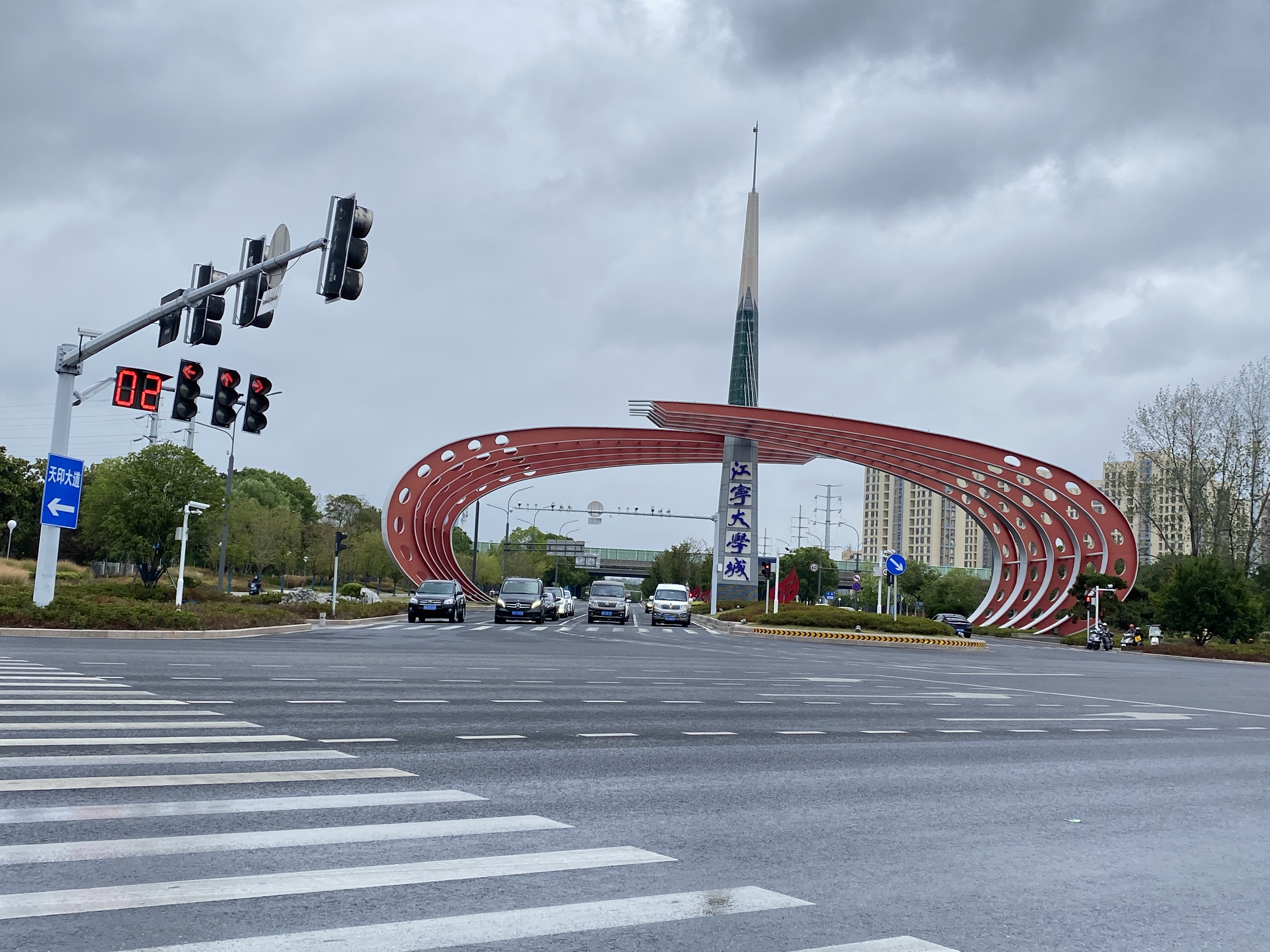
Jiangning University Town decorated archway

== Lishui University Town ==
Lishui University Town is located in the southern district of Nanjing. It is a newly emerging university town in recent years. It actively attracts high-quality educational resources of all ages to set up, such as Jinling Middle School, Suzhou Foreign Language School, Nanjing Foreign Language School, Nanjing Art Institute, etc. The government hope to create a new university town full of literature, art, science and education.

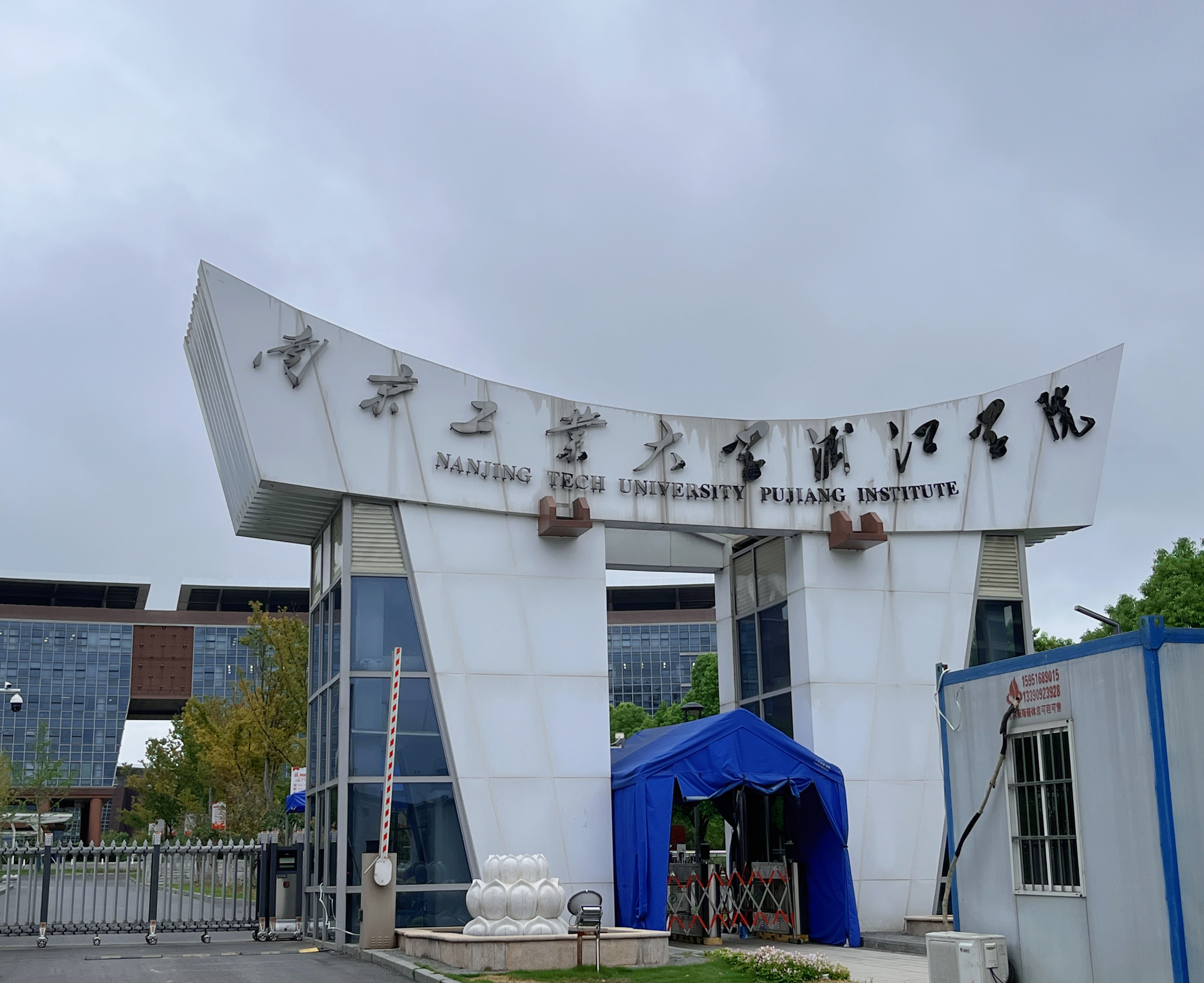
Nanjing University of Technology pujing institute in Lishui University Town
