= Stephen S. Attwood =

American academic (1897–1965)

Stephen Stanley Attwood
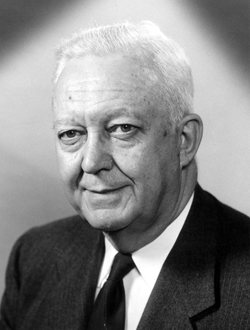
- Born: 1897
- Died: 1965 (aged 67–68)

Stephen Stanley Attwood (1897–1965) was an American academic. He was a professor at the Wave Propagation Group, division of War Research, Columbia University. He served as the 7th dean of the University of Michigan College of Engineering from 1957 to 1965.
