= Amy Mensch =

American combustion scientist

Amy Mensch is an American mechanical engineer, combustion scientist, and expert on fire safety. She works for the National Institute of Standards and Technology (NIST) as head of the Engineered Fire Safety Group in the Fire Research Division of the institute's Engineering Laboratory. Her research has included the discovery that soot can be measured by flashing it with light and recording the popping sound that it produces.

== Education and career ==
Mensch graduated from Souderton Area High School, near Philadelphia, in 2003. She majored in mechanical engineering at the University of Maryland, Baltimore County, graduating in 2007, and was listed on the America East Conference commissioner's academic honor roll as a member of the university's swimming and diving team. She received a master's degree from the Pennsylvania State University in 2009, with the master's thesis A Study on the Sooting Tendency of Jet Fuel Surrogates Using the Threshold Soot Index.

After working for NIST from 2009 to 2011, she returned to Penn State for doctoral study. She rejoined NIST in 2015 after completing her Ph.D. Her 2015 doctoral dissertation, Using Conjugate Heat Transfer to Assess the Cooling Performance on a Turbine Endwall, was advised by Karen Thole.

== Recognition ==
In 2025, the American Society of Mechanical Engineers (ASME) gave Mensch their Lakshmi Singh Early Career Leadership Award, and in 2026 she was named as an ASME Fellow.
