= Nanjing Foreign Language School =

Municipal public secondary school in Nanjing, Jiangsu, China

- 南京外国语学校

Location
- 30 East Beijing Rd; Nanjing, Jiangsu, 210008; China; 32°03′30″N 118°47′47″E

Information
- Type: Public secondary school
- Motto: Chinese Soul Global Vision(中国灵魂 世界胸怀)
- Established: 1963
- CEEB code: 694268
- Principal: Yudong Zhang (张玉东)
- Faculty: 373
- Grades: 7-12
- Student to teacher ratio: 8:1
- Song: 世界情怀
- Nickname: 南外、南夫拉斯
- Newspaper: 七彩南外
- Graduates: 18,000 (2019)
- Website: www.nfls.com.cn

Nanjing Foreign Language School (NFLS, 南京外国语学校) is a municipal public secondary school in Xuanwu, Nanjing, Jiangsu, China. The school is administered by the Nanjing City Education Bureau. The school was originally founded in 1963.

== Branch schools ==
As of 2019, NFLS has established several branch schools in Nanjing and around Jiangsu Province:

- NFLS Xianlin Campus, established in 2002 in collaboration with Nanjing Government, twelve-year private boarding school;
- NFLS Hexi Campus, established in June 2012, three-year public middle school;
- Nanjing Pukou Foreign Language School, established in August 2012, nine-year public school;
- NFLS Fangshan Campus, established in 2018, twelve-year private school;
- NFLS Huai'an campus; operational from 2018-2019 onward with classes from the preschool to high school levels.

== Notable alumni ==
- Lu Shaye (Class of 1982), Chinese diplomat and ambassador
- Liu Mingyan (Class of 1991), the 17th dean of the University of Michigan College of Engineering
- Zhang Zetian (Class of 2011), businesswoman who married to Liu Qiangdong, CEO of JD.com.

== See also ==
- List of foreign-language schools in China
