= University of Michigan Center for Digital Curricula =

US research center

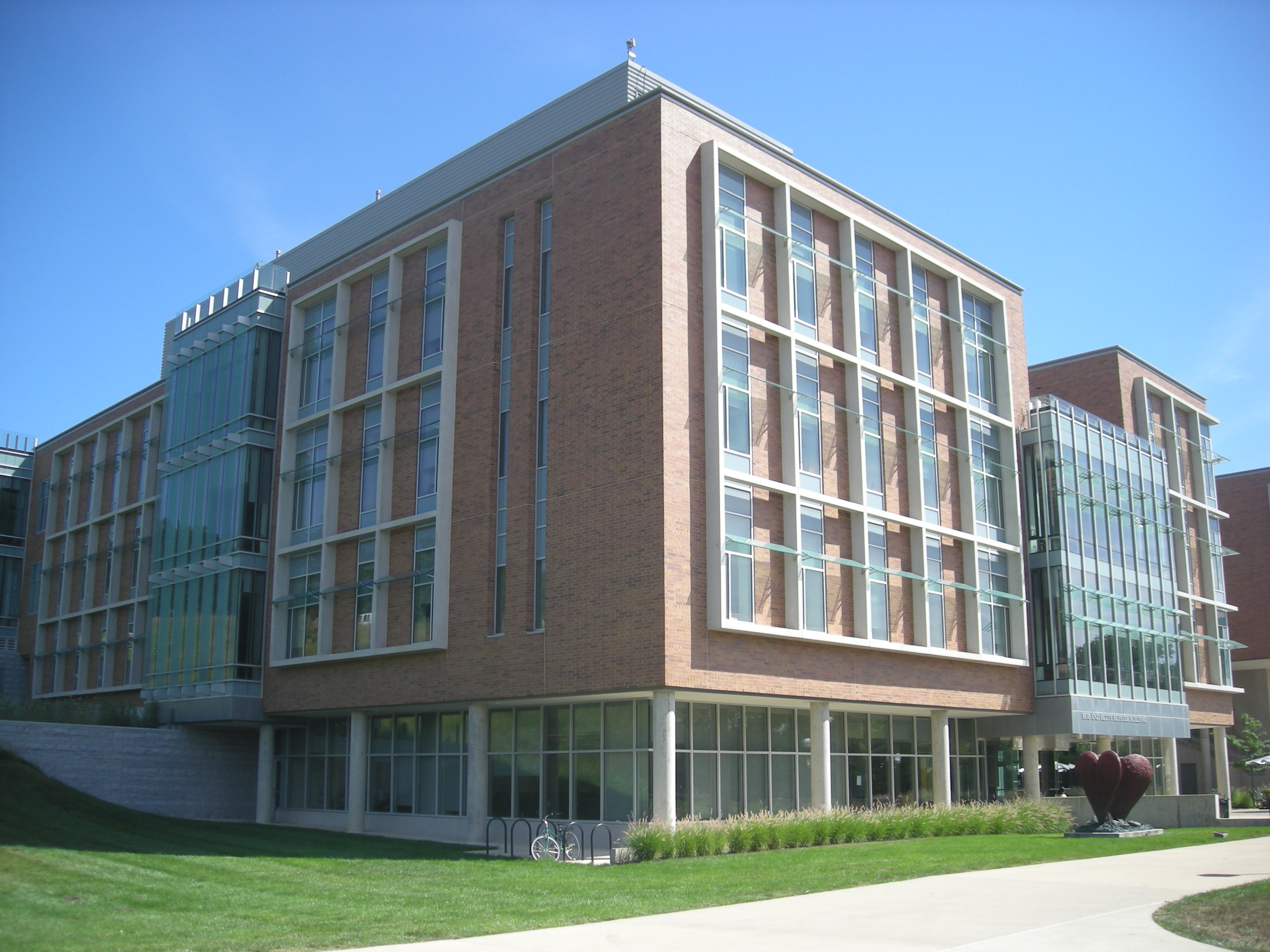
- The Bob and Betty Beyster Building
- Established: July 2019; 7 years ago
- Field of research: Education
- Directors: Elliot Soloway, Cathie Norris
- Location: 2260 Hayward St., Ann Arbor, Michigan, 48109, United States
- Operating agency: University of Michigan College of Engineering
- Website: cdc.engin.umich.edu

The University of Michigan Center for Digital Curricula (CDC) is an educational research center at the University of Michigan College of Engineering. Located in Ann Arbor, Michigan, it is dedicated to the development of deeply-digital, open educational resources.

== History ==
In 2019 professors Elliot Soloway and Cathie Norris founded the Center for Digital Curricula under the auspices of the University of Michigan, College of Engineering, for the purposes of building deeply-digital open curricula. These curricula, composed by the Center's team of educators, are designed to be delivered through the Collabrify Roadmap Platform, a software platform first developed in the mid 2010s.

Roadmaps - the visual format for the deeply-digital lessons - have been produced at the University of Michigan College of Engineering. Currently, the Center provides standards-aligned curricula for K-5, all 4 core subjects (ELA, math, science, social studies). The Roadmap lessons use the Collabrify Suite of Productivity Tools in supporting highly-interactive, engaging, lessons. The Suite includes: Collabrify Multimedia Writer (writing with text, video, audio, images), Collabrify Flipbook (drawing, animating), Collabrify Venn (Venn diagramming, Collabrify Chart (spreadsheeting), Collabrify Map (concept mapping), Collabrify PDFpal (editing PDF files). All apps are "collabrified" - they support synchronous collaboration.

Due to the demand for digital education as a result of the COVID-19 pandemic, the Center for Digital Curricula began offering their products freely to school districts across the United States.
