= University of Michigan Solar Car Team =

Organization at University of Michigan

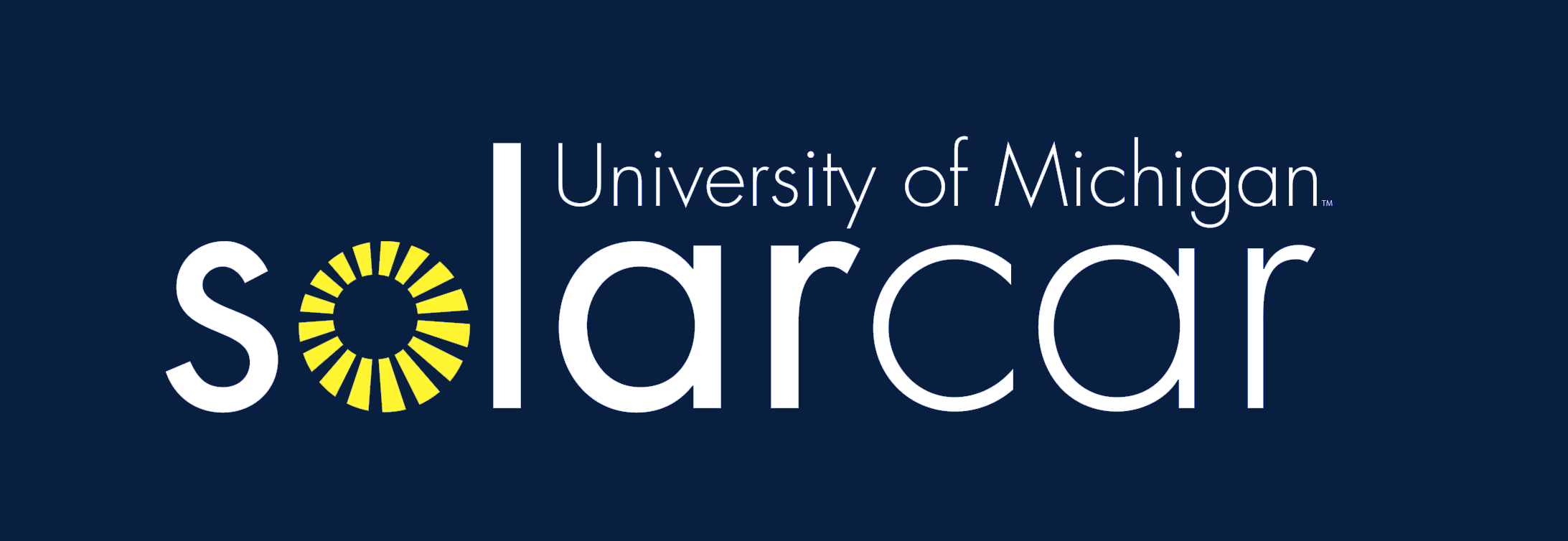
- Founded: 1989
- Headquarters: Ann Arbor, Michigan
- Parent: University of Michigan
- Divisions: Engineering; Business; Operations; Communications
- Website: solarcar.engin.umich.edu

The University of Michigan Solar Car Team is an engineering project team at the University of Michigan in Ann Arbor that designs, builds, and races some of the world's most advanced solar-electric vehicles. Having won the North American Solar Challenge (NASC) ten times (out of a possible thirteen), the team is regarded as the most successful in North America. Internationally, they placed third in the World Solar Challenge (WSC) six times and placed second in 2017 – the best ever achieved by an American collegiate team. Many of the team's 16 vehicles are on display in museums in the United States and abroad.

== Composition and history ==
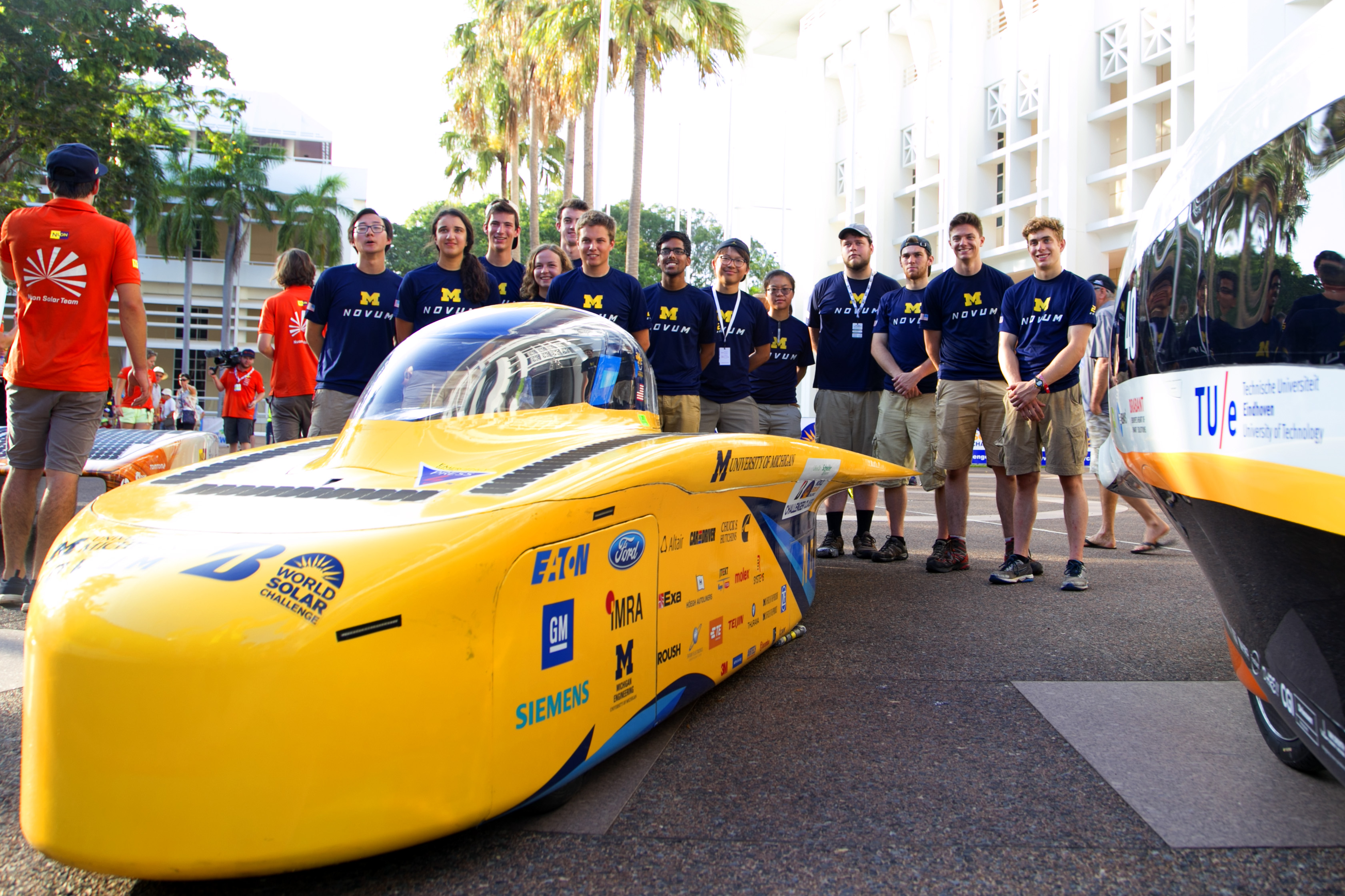
The team poses for a group photo at the Bridgestone World Solar Challenge 2017 starting line

Founded in 1989 by Bill Kaliardos, an undergraduate student in Aerospace Engineering and Mechanical Engineering, the University of Michigan Solar Car Team is one of the largest and most successful student projects at the university. The inaugural 1990 team, which formed in 1989, was eventually managed by Susan Fancy, with Professor and Dean Gene Smith serving as the team's Faculty Advisor. Gene Smith was also Advisor for many other U-M Solar Car Teams to follow. The teams have built eleven solar cars and competed in 15 major races. Although it draws heavily on undergraduate students from the College of Engineering, students from any academic discipline or year of study are allowed to join the team. Students have also come from the College of LS&A, the Ross School of Business, and the Stamps School of Art & Design.

In 1990, the team's first car, Sunrunner, finished in first place in the inaugural GM Sunrayce USA, and third place overall (first place in Student category) in the 1990 World Solar Challenge in Australia. Core team members of the 1990 team included Susan Fancy, Paula Finnegan, David Noles, Chetan Maini (Maini went on to become the founder of Reva which is one of the major electric car companies in India), David Bell, Jef Pavlat, Andy Swiecki, Chris Gregory, and many more.

The second generation team built its car, Maize & Blue, and competed in Sunrayce 93 (the predecessor to the North American Solar Challenge) finishing in first place in the national race, and 11th in the World Solar Challenge.

After 1993's races, all projects have run on a 2-year cycle. During those two years, the team is typically anywhere from 50 to 125 students. The vast majority of these students volunteer their time freely, although in the past a small percentage opt to receive credit via the university's Undergraduate Research Opportunities Program (or UROP). A race crew of approximately 20 students is selected to race the vehicle in competition. These students' function is similar to that of a pit crew in professional auto racing.

As of 2024, UM's solar car project has won the North American championship ten times, and had 7 podium finishes at the Bridgestone World Solar Challenge.

== Vehicles by year ==
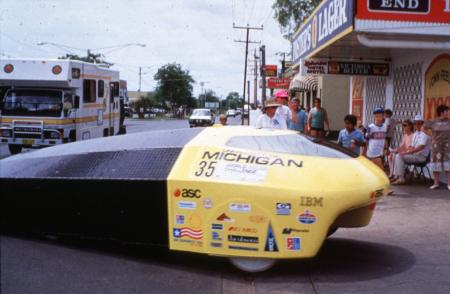
Sunrunner in Australia

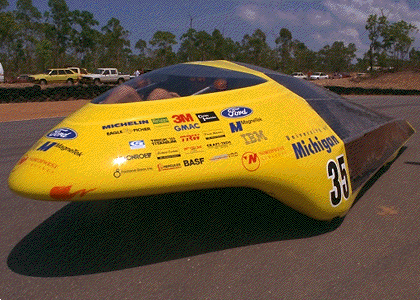
Maize & Blue in Darwin, Australia

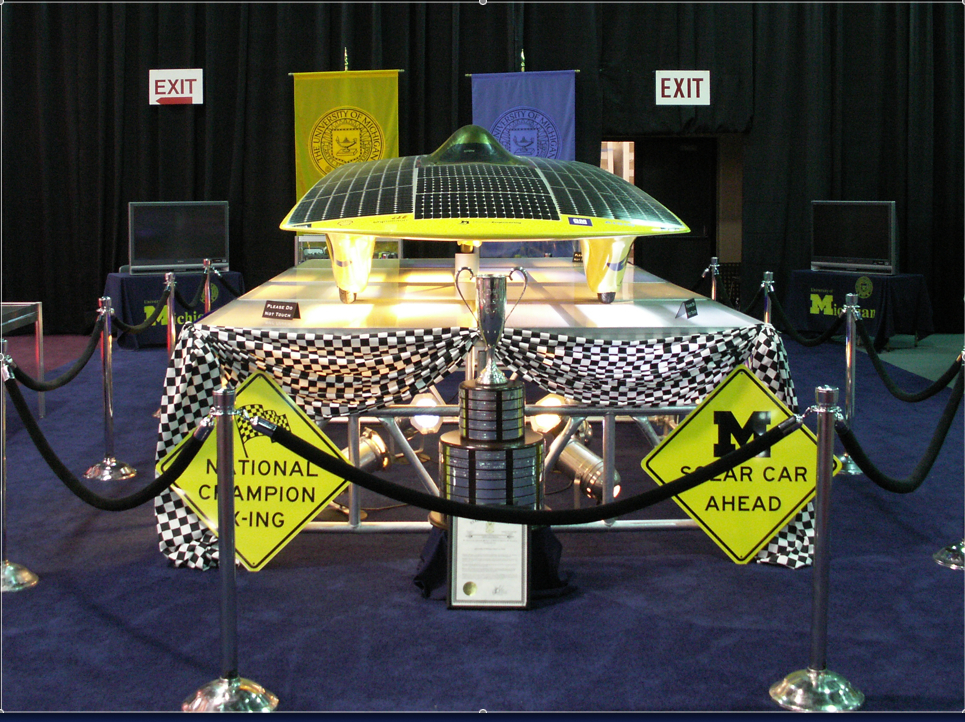
Momentum on display at the 2006 North American International Auto Show

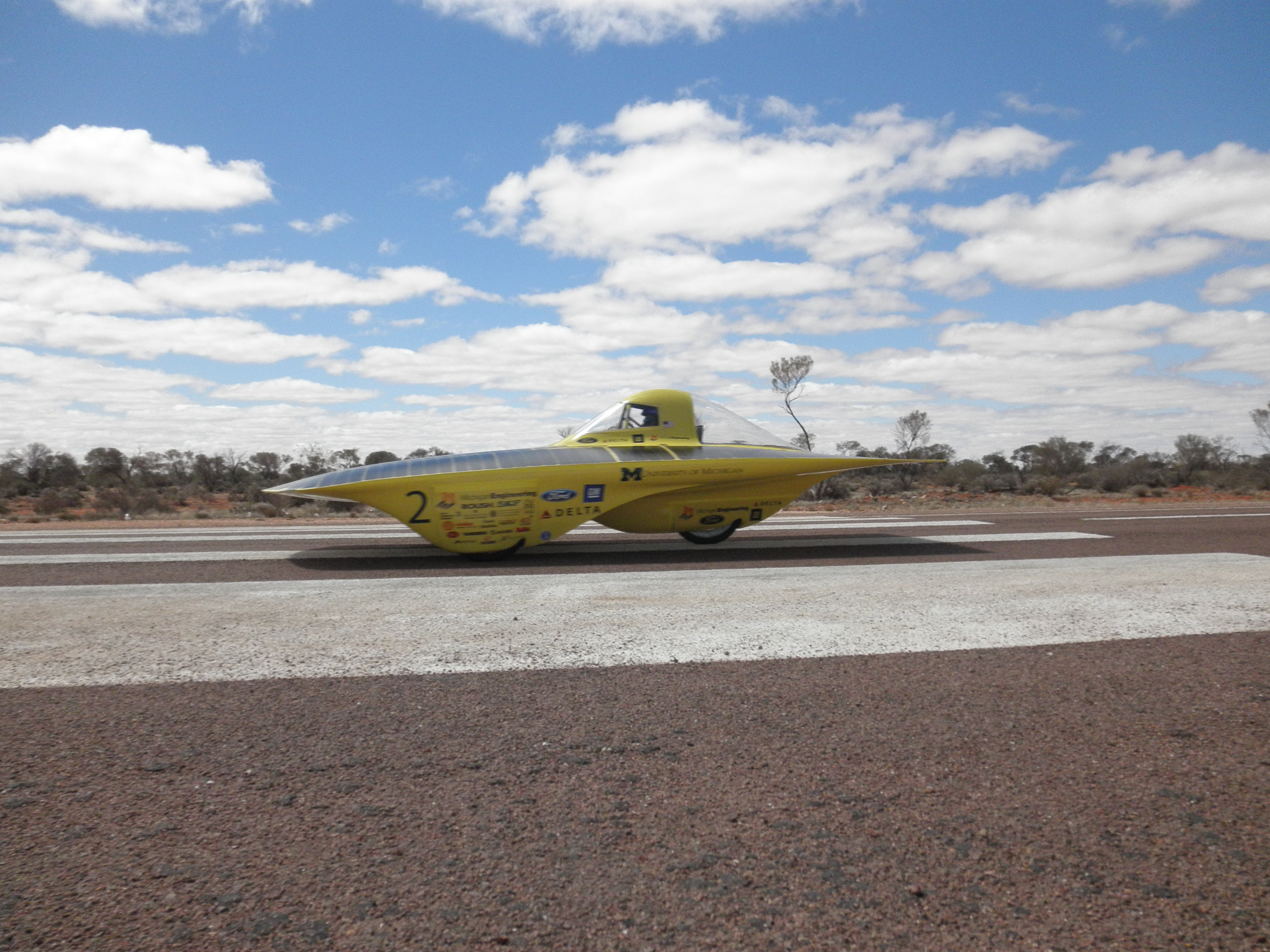
Infinium during roll-down testing on the Stuart Highway

- 1990: Sunrunner - Driven by Paula Finnegan and David Noles for GM Sunrayce: 1st place;WSC: 3rd place. On permanent display at the Henry Ford Museum of American Innovation in Dearborn.
- 1993: Maize & Blue - Sunrayce USA: 1st place; WSC: 11th place. On permanent display at the Museum of Science and Industry in Chicago.
- 1995: Solar Vision - GM Sunrayce: DNF (did not finish). On permanent display at the Great Lakes Science Center in Cleveland.
- 1997: Wolverine - GM Sunrayce: 6th place.
- 1999: MaizeBlaze - GM Sunrayce: 17th place; WSC: 9th place.
- 2001: M-Pulse - ASC: 1st place;WSC: 3rd place. On display at the Peterson Automotive Museum in Los Angeles.
- 2003: Spectrum - ASC: DNQ (did not qualify)
- 2005: Momentum - NASC: 1st place;WSC: 3rd place.On display at the Lemay Automotive Museum in Tacoma, WA.
- 2007: Continuum - WSC: 7th place in the Challenge class after recovering from a crash on the first day of racing.On display at the Michigan Science Center in Detroit.
- 2008: Continuum - NASC: 1st place.
- 2009: Infinium - WSC: 3rd place. On display at the University of Michigan – Flint.
- 2010: Infinium - ASC: 1st place.
- 2011: Quantum - WSC: 3rd place. On display at Prince Alfred College in Adelaide, Australia.
- 2012: Quantum - ASC: 1st place.
- 2013: Generation - WSC: 9th place.
- 2014: Quantum - ASC: 1st place.
- 2015: Quantum - Abu Dhabi Solar Challenge: 1st place.
- 2015: Aurum - WSC: 4th place.
- 2016: Aurum - ASC: 1st place.
- 2017: Novum - WSC: 2nd place. (Best ever finish for an American student team)
- 2018: Novum - ASC: 2nd place.
- 2019: Electrum - BWSC: 3rd place. On display at the Roush Automotive Collection in Livonia, MI.
- 2022: Aevum - Michigan Sun Run
- 2023: Astrum - BWSC: 4th place.
- 2024: Astrum - ASC: 1st place.
- 2025: Millennium - BWSC 7th place.

== Publications ==
The team has been featured in the following local, national, and international media:

- IEEE Spectrum: "Sun Kings Cross the Outback." G. Zorpette, Feb 2002, pp 40–46.
- Electric & Hybrid Vehicle Technology International
- MSNBC (2005) 1,2, 3
- NHRA article (2006): Grubnic compares kinetics with the U. of Michigan solar car team
- Cars.com
- Russian Automobile magazine
- Lakeshore Weekly News
- U-M News Service
- Popular Mechanics
- SAE International (April 2010)
- The New York Times
- Squatriglia, Chuck (April 25, 2011). "U. of Michigan Solar Car Slims Down to Go Down Under". Wired.
- Discovery Channel (The Solar Car portion starts at 8:40)
- Seeker
