= Gordon Van Wylen =

American engineer and educator (1920–2020)

- Born: Gordon John Van Wylen; February 6, 1920; Grant, Michigan, U.S.
- Died: November 5, 2020 (aged 100); Holland, Michigan, U.S.
- Occupations: Physicist, educator
- Known for: Textbooks on thermodynamics Tenure as president of Hope College

Gordon John Van Wylen (February 6, 1920 – November 5, 2020) was an American engineer and educator, known for his textbooks on thermodynamics. He served as the 9th president of Hope College from 1972 to 1987 and as the 8th dean of the University of Michigan College of Engineering from 1965 to 1972.

== Biography ==
Van Wylen was born in Grant, Michigan. He served in the United States Navy during World War II.

He received a bachelor's degree from Calvin College, a master's degree from University of Michigan, and a doctorate degree from Massachusetts Institute of Technology.

In 1959, he published a textbook Thermodynamics, in which he stated a belief in "a Creator" in his summation of the second law of thermodynamics. “A final point to be made is that the second law of thermodynamics and the principle of increase in entropy have great philosophical implications. The question that arises is how did the universe get into the state of reduced entropy in the first place, since all natural processes known to us tend to increase entropy? ... The author has found that the second law tends to increase his conviction that there is a Creator who has the answer for the future destiny of man and the universe.”

He was chair of the Engineering Department at the University of Michigan from 1969 to 1972. He was appointed president of Hope College in Holland, Michigan, in 1972, serving until his retirement in 1987. He died of complications from COVID-19 in Holland, on November 5, 2020, at the age of 100, during the COVID-19 pandemic in Michigan.

== Bibliography ==
- Van Wylen, Gordon J. (1994). Fundamentals of classical thermodynamics. Richard Edwin Sonntag, C. Borgnakke (4th ed.). New York: Wiley. ISBN 0-471-59395-8. OCLC 28847435. (Note: According to WorldCat, the book was published in 8 editions and is held in 932 libraries.)
- Van Wylen, Gordon John (1 January 1959). Thermodynamics. Wiley. (Note: Worldcat shows it in 297 libraries. Various editions of these books have been translated into Chinese and Arabic.)
