= Neutron Science Laboratory =

US research laboratory

Coordinates: 42.293461°N 83.709041°W

The Neutron Science Laboratory (NSL) is situated within the North Campus of the University of Michigan and houses various neutron and gamma-ray sources and a range of nuclear radiation detection equipment. The laboratory is an integral part of Nuclear Engineering and Radiological Sciences (NERS) department at the University of Michigan (U-M) and is managed by the Applied Nuclear Science Group. The laboratory was renovated in 2017 with a specific goal to accommodate the use of a new DT neutron generator (Thermo Fisher Scientific, Model P211) in various open-beam configurations. NSL provides convenient access to high-fidelity monoenergetic and broad-energy neutron sources for basic research, nuclear security and nonproliferation, and other experimental needs.

== History ==
The NERS department previously managed and used the Ford Nuclear Reactor at the Phoenix Memorial Laboratory. The reactor provided an access to a neutron source for instructional and experimental use. In 2003, the Ford Nuclear Reactor was shut down and decommissioning operations began. A neutron source was still required for educational and research use. In 2004, the NERS Department purchased a DD neutron generator (Thermo Fisher Scientific, Model MP320, producing 2.45 MeV with a rate of 10^{6} n/s).

A decision was also made to have a dedicated facility for a neutron source, and in 2006, the first deliveries of components for a D711 DT neutron generator from Thermo Electron Corporation (USA) were made to the department. This generator was rated to produce up to 2 × 10^{10} n/s at 14.1 MeV, a useful flux for nuclear activation studies. Final installation and operation of the D711 neutron generator commenced in 2007. The original housing for the neutron generator consisted of a prefabricated concrete “cave”. The cave was about 3 m in length and 1.5 m wide and had windows on two sides. The walls were about 35 cm thick. By simulating the cave and surrounding room, it was determined that 2.5 cm of polyethylene lining added to the inside and outside of the cave would help thermalize the neutrons. In addition, another 60-cm thick wall was built of concrete blocks around the entirety of the cave. The floor was also lined with 5 cm of polyethylene to reduce scatter from the floor. This reduced the average dose on the surface of the cave below 10 mRem/hr. “Hotspots” still existed at the points closest to the source, but they were less than 50 mRem/hr, well within the 100 mRem/hr regulation.

In 2017, the D711 neutron generator was decommissioned and a new DT neutron generator (Thermo Fisher Scientific, Model P211, producing up to 10^{8} n/s at 100 Hz) was acquired with a goal to provide a pulsed neutron source with near-monoenergetic spectrum by operating the unit in open space, far from structural or shielding walls and floor. The NSL was redesigned and renovated to ensure that the dose rates around the laboratory stay within the permissible limits. The renovated NSL provides a convenient access to both monoenergetic (DD/DT) and broad-energy (^{252}Cf) neutron sources to the faculty, staff, and students of University of Michigan. The laboratory also houses various radioisotope gamma sources, detectors, and supporting nuclear instrumentation.

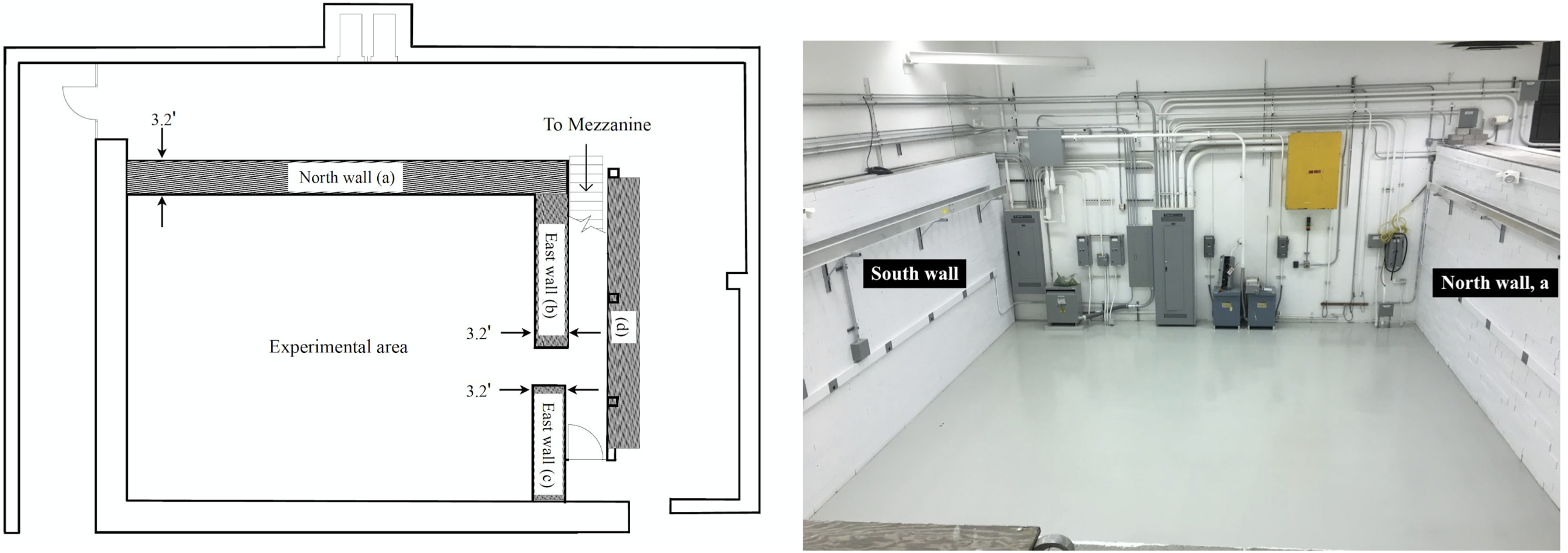
Left: Schematic of the NSL at the University of Michigan. Right: Picture showing the renovated laboratory (2017-Present).

== P211 DT Neutron Generator ==
The P211 DT Neutron Generator manufactured by Thermo Fisher Scientific, utilizes the ^{3}H(d,n)^{4}He fusion reactions to produce 14.1 MeV neutrons. A beam of deuterons is accelerated to ~80 keV and bombards a tritium-impregnated target in the generator assembly. The generator is cylindrical in shape and has a rated output of 10^{8} n/s. Individual pulses contain 10^{6} neutrons and can be produced at various repetition rates - from single shot to 100 Hz. The P211 generator is further designed so that no neutrons are produced between pulses.

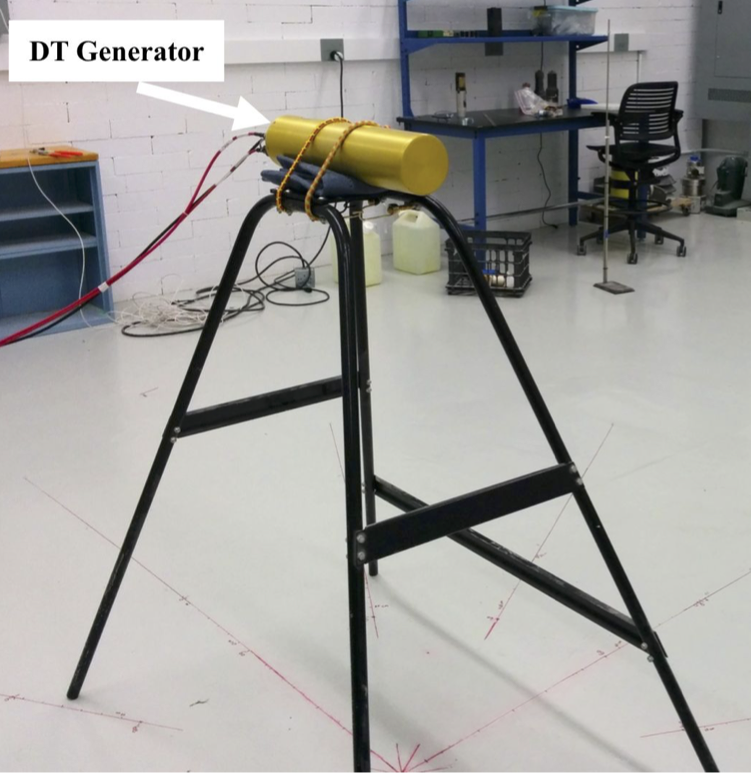
P211 Neutron Generator at the Neutron Science Laboratory

== Regulatory Limits ==
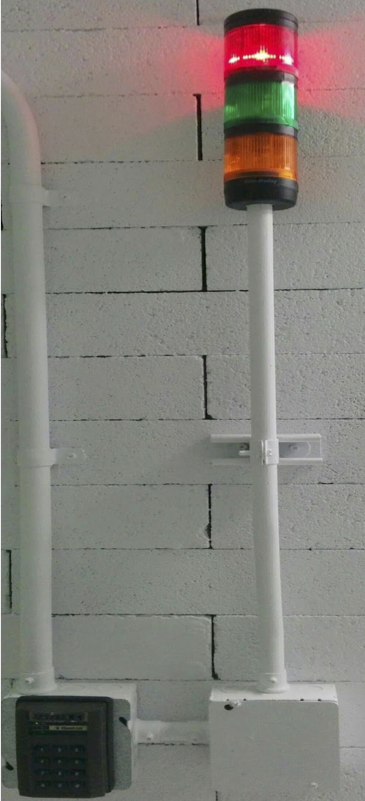
Safety interlock station at the NSL. The NSL has four such stations having a keypad and a light tree.

The State of Michigan of Community Health (MDCH) is the regulatory body to which the design of the NSL must comply. MDCH limits Class AA installations public exposure to be less than 2 mrem/h, measure 5 cm from any accessible external surface point, while the source is operating at maximum radiation output. Therefore, the lab was designed such that the dose rates are less than 2 mrem/h at any point outside of the experimental area with DT generator in operation (since it is the most intense source in the laboratory) The concrete walls were made 3 ft thick according to the guidance from The National Council on Radiation Protection and Measurements Report No. 144, “Radiation Protection for Particle Accelerator Facilities,” and the MCNP simulations. The walls were made 11 ft tall to permit experiments at various heights of the DT generator. After renovation of the laboratory and installation of safety interlocks, the P211 DT generator was first operated on 28 November 2017. The dose rates were experimentally determined outside of the laboratory walls and were below the permissible limit of 2 mrem/h. On that day, NSL was approved for operation by the U-M Radiation Safety Service.
