= Karen Thole =

American mechanical engineer

Karen Ann Thole
- Born: July 11, 1960 (age 66); Breese, Illinois, U.S.
- Education: University of Illinois Urbana-Champaign (BS, MS); University of Texas at Austin (PhD)
- Spouse: Michael Alley
- Awards: Edwin F. Church Medal
- Scientific career
- Workplaces: University of Wisconsin–Madison; Virginia Tech; Pennsylvania State University; University of Michigan
- Thesis: High freestream turbulence effects on the transport of heat and momentum (1992)
- Doctoral students: Amy Mensch

Signature
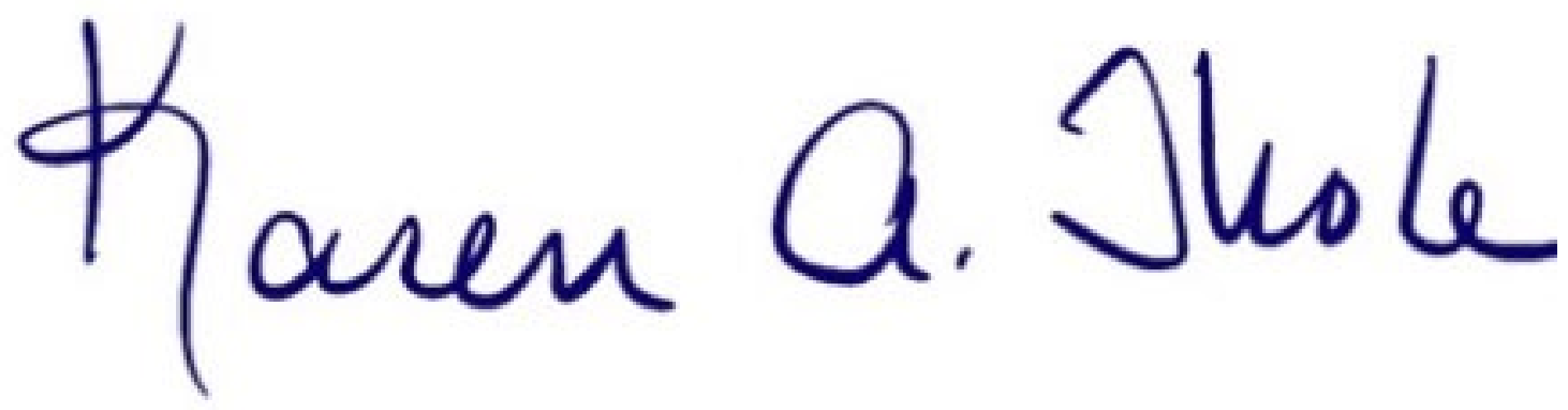

Karen Ann Thole (born July 11, 1960) is an American mechanical engineer who has been serving as the 16th dean of the University of Michigan College of Engineering since August 2024. She previously served as the head of the Department of Mechanical Engineering at Pennsylvania State University from 2006 to 2021. Thole was first promoted to professor in 2003 at Virginia Tech.

== Early life and education ==
Thole was born on July 11, 1960, in Breese, Illinois, to an army veteran father. She was raised on a dairy farm and by fifth grade was driving a tractor around the field. She graduated from Central Community High School in Clinton County, Illinois. She enrolled at Eastern Illinois University in Charleston, Illinois, for two years before transferring to the University of Illinois Urbana-Champaign. During her undergraduate career, she received the Caterpillar Scholarship at the University of Illinois.

She received a Bachelor of Science with a major in mechanical engineering in 1982 and a Master of Science in mechanical engineering in 1984, both from the University of Illinois Urbana-Champaign. She received a Doctor of Philosophy in mechanical engineering from the University of Texas at Austin in 1994. Her doctoral dissertation was on mechanical and aerospace engineering, titled High freestream turbulence effects on the transport of heat and momentum (1992).

== Career ==
After receiving the doctorate, Thole spent one year as a post-doctoral researcher at the Institute for Thermal Turbomachinery at the Karlsruhe Institute of Technology in Germany. She soon returned to North America and accepted an assistant professor position at the University of Wisconsin–Madison. During her short tenure at the University of Wisconsin–Madison, Thole received a 1996 National Science Foundation CAREER Award. Thole left the University of Wisconsin–Madison in 1999 to join the faculty at Virginia Tech, where her husband Michael Alley also worked. In 1999, she accepted a position in the Mechanical Engineering Department at Virginia Polytechnic Institute and State University, where she was promoted to professor in 2003, and was recognized as the William S. Cross Professor of Mechanical Engineering in 2005. While there, she focused on heat transfer and fluid mechanics while specializing in turbulent boundary layers, convective heat transfer, and high freestream turbulence effects. As a result of her research success, Thole became the first woman at Virginia Tech to be awarded an endowed engineering professorship in 2005.

Shortly following her promotion, Thole left Virginia Tech to become the head of the Department of Mechanical and Nuclear Engineering at Pennsylvania State University (Penn State) in July 2006. In this role, she advocated, recruited, and retained girls and women in science, technology, engineering, and math fields. As such, she was honored by the White House as a "Champion of Change" in 2011. Thole also established the Steady Thermal Aero Research Turbine Laboratory which was "focused on gas turbine heat transfer during continuous operation at realistic engine conditions." A few years later, Thole was also named the Society of Women Engineers’ 2014 Distinguished Engineering Educator.

During her tenure at Penn State, Thole established the Engineering Ambassadors Network, a program that provided undergraduate students with professional skills. As such, she received the 2016 Edwin F. Church Medal from the American Society of Mechanical Engineers. She also made significant technical contributions in "pioneering new cooling strategies for airfoils in gas turbine engines, which allows for higher operating temperatures and reduced fuel consumption." Thole then collaborated with other engineers to find ways to reduce carbon dioxide emissions from turbines. As a result of her research, Thole testified in front of the United States Congress. In 2017, Thole was appointed a Penn State Distinguished Professor and appointed to American Society of Mechanical Engineers Board of Governors. She also received the 2017 Claire L. Felbinger Award for Diversity for "extraordinary success in achieving or facilitating diversity and inclusiveness in the technological segments of our society."

In 2019, John J. Brennan established the Professor Karen A. Thole Annual Scholarship for Diversity in Engineering. Thole was also awarded the Air Breathing Propulsion Award from the American Institute of Aeronautics and Astronautics. In 2021 she stepped down as department chair, and was succeeded by Mary Frecker.

In May 2024, Thole was announced as the University of Michigan College of Engineering's first female Robert J. Vlasic Dean. Her term began on August 1, 2024.
