= Ford Nuclear Reactor =

Decommissioned nuclear reactor at the University of Michigan

Coordinates: 42°17′27.1″N 83°42′53.0″W

The Ford Nuclear Reactor was a facility at the University of Michigan in Ann Arbor dedicated to investigating the peaceful uses of nuclear power. It was part of the Michigan Memorial Phoenix Project, a functional memorial created to honor the 585 lives lost from the university during the war. The reactor operated from September 1957 until July 3, 2003. During its operation, the FNR was used to study medicine, cellular biology, chemistry, physics, mineralogy, archeology, anthropology, and nuclear science.

The reactor was a swimming pool reactor, originally operating at 1 MW using 93% enriched U-235 aluminum-based fuel. It was later upgraded to 2 MW, using 19.5% enriched fuel. The Department of Energy fabricated, transported, and disposed of the fuel at no cost to the University. The reactor had a peak thermal flux of 3×10^{13} n/cm^{2}s. It had 10 beam ports. It was constructed by Babcock & Wilcox under a subcontract with Leeds & Northrup.

The decommissioned FNR building, Phoenix Memorial Laboratory, still stands on North Campus at the University of Michigan. The building has been renovated into a home for the Michigan Memorial Phoenix Energy Institute, a university-wide program tasked with charting the path towards sustainable energy. In 2015 a $12 million dollar renovation began on the reactor space itself to transform the area into a new laboratory for the Nuclear Engineering department at the university. The laboratory building, named the Nuclear Engineering Laboratory, was opened in April 2017.

== The Michigan Memorial Phoenix Project ==
The Michigan Memorial Phoenix Project was a living World War II memorial pursuing peaceful uses of nuclear energy. It originated from a student-led effort to establish a functional memorial commemorating the members of the university community who had died in World War II, and was ultimately funded by over 25,000 private contributors by individuals and corporations, such as the Ford Motor Company, which donated $1 million for the establishment of a research reactor. The FNR was a major facility at the MMPP, but the project handled the funding of research grants throughout the university. The project eventually led to the Office of the Vice President for Research and the Alumni Fund.

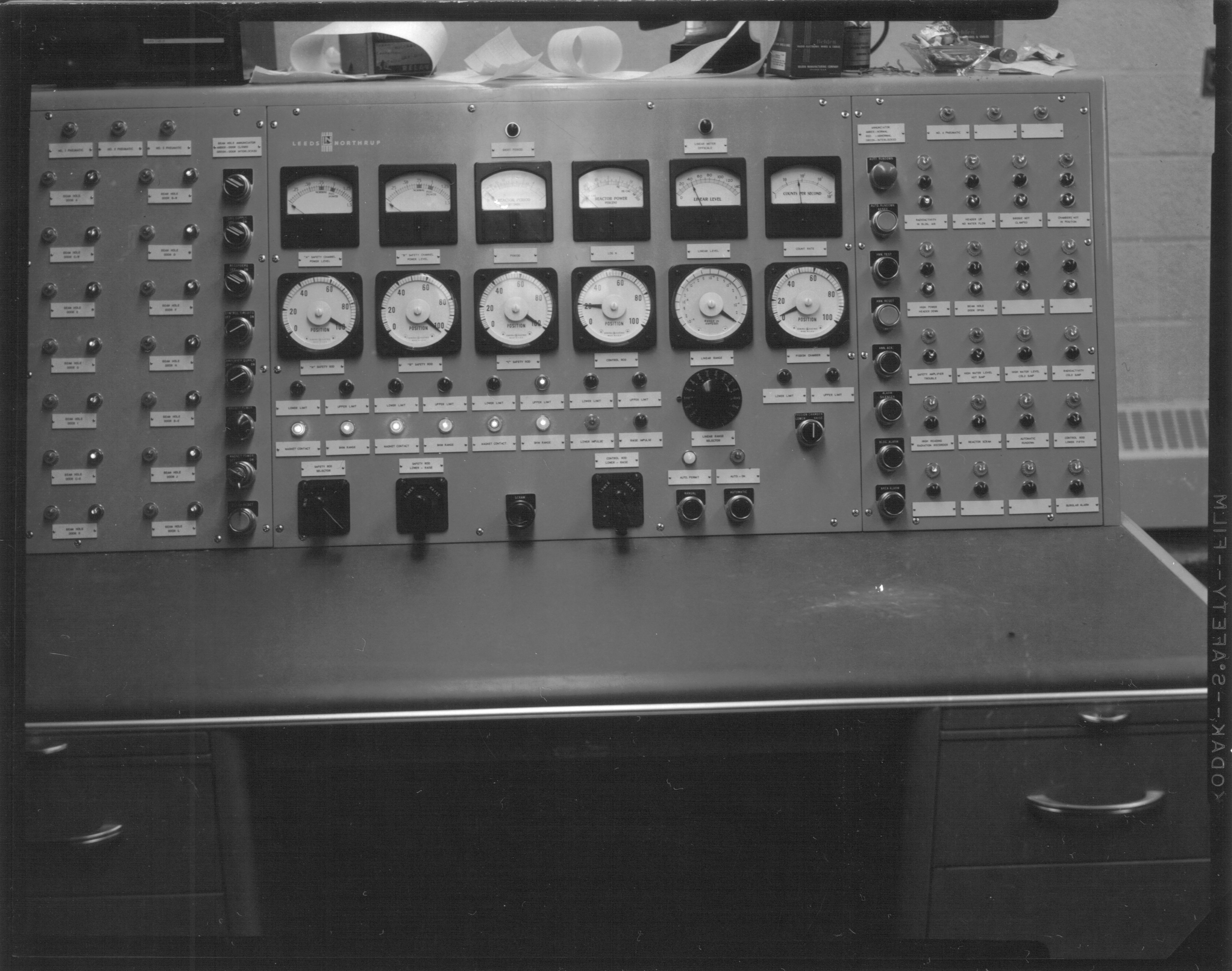
The Ford Nuclear Reactor control panel.

The Phoenix lab and FNR on North Campus at U of M.

Directors of the Michigan Memorial Phoenix Project

- 1951-1959 Dr. Ralph A. Sawyer
- 1959-1961 Henry J. Gomberg
- 1961-1989 William Kerr
- 1989-1998 Ronald F. Fleming
- 1998-2001 John C. Lee (Interim Director)
- 2001-2003 David Wehe

== Beginnings ==
Original calls for a war memorial came from University of Michigan students in 1947. Fred Smith, a local alumnus, suggested a project looking into the peaceful uses of nuclear power. A full page poster was printed in the Michigan Daily suggesting that the Phoenix Project will show that Americans can work to benefit the world. The idea stuck, and Ralph Sawyer, the Dean of the Rackham Graduate School at UM, began planning.

In February 1955, the Atomic Energy Commission licensed the FNR. In the summer of 1955, construction began. The reactor was dedicated on November 16, 1956. On September 18, 1957, the final mechanical manipulations and calculations were taking place. With Ralph Sawyer, Henry Gomberg, and Ardath Emmons standing by, the reactor achieved first criticality around 4 in the morning on September 19, 1957. On August 11, 1958, the FNR power reached its rated level of 1 megawatt.

== Research ==
Research was performed in many multi-disciplined areas. Work was done investigating the safety of food irradiation. The Phoenix Lab featured a greenhouse, allowing for much of the early work on the effects of radiation on plant life to be done. The Chemistry department ran a program testing radiation's ability to crack hydrocarbons. A carbon-14 dating clock was set up, allowing scientists to accurately date organic relics. Neutron radiography was possible, allowing high resolution imaging of dense materials.

Nuclear engineers often used the reactor for neutron activation analysis, a science capable of measuring trace amounts of materials. It was also used for a wide variety of other nuclear research.

The reactor pool

A hydrocarbon cracking experiment

Carbon dating

Thyroid diagnostics

Food irradiation research

Food preservation research

Hot storage

Manipulator practice

== Other uses ==
The reactor was used to produce several isotopes. Iodine-131 and nickel-59 were produced as a radioactive tracer for the medical school, bromine-82 was produced for the auto companies, who made use of it to track oil consumption in internal combustion engines. The reactor was also used to train utility workers in 1-2 week nuclear instrumentation and reactor operation courses. The reactor offered neutron- and gamma-radiation damage testing services. The FNR was often open for tours.

== Review Committee, 1997 ==
In June 1997, the Ford Nuclear Reactor Review Committee submitted a report to the Vice President for Research (Vince Pecoraro, at the time) on the future of the FNR. The Committee estimated that the reactor was costing the university $1 million/year.

Letters had been sent to various university departments as well as to other institutions that made use of the reactor, asking for input on their use of the facility.

Profs. Alex Halliday and Eric Essene from the department of Geology relied heavily on the reactor for their research in Ar-40—Ar-39 aging, and sent strong praise of the reactor. Gary Was from the department of Nuclear Engineering and Radiological Sciences explained that over 15 NERS courses rely on the reactor, as well as nearly every professor's research. The Museum of Anthropology also suggested that the loss of the reactor would have serious adverse impacts on the students and faculty. Several other departments, such as the Chemistry department, said that they had not used the reactor in 30 years and did not plan to in the future.

Outside the University community, the Michigan State University Department of Geological Science, Louisiana State University, the University of Nevada Las Vegas, Buchtel College of Arts and Sciences, the University of California Santa Barbara, the University of Georgia, Oak Ridge National Laboratory, NIST, the NRC, Sandia National Labs, EPRI, Ford, and GM all expressed interest in keeping the reactor operational, while NASA (among others) had no interest.

The final decision was to shut down and decommission the reactor. The statement given by UM Vice President for Research was:

In recent years, however, the reactor's use by the U-M academic community has declined substantially to the point where the bulk of the users now come from the federal government and industry. Given this change, the University can no longer justify the reactor's substantial cost of operation, which now largely subsidizes non-University users.

== Recent Work ==
Though the reactor has been shut down since 2003, the space that housed the reactor has seen little activity past the decade long dismantling of the reactor. In recent years, however, the University of Michigan has begun transforming the old reactor space into lab areas for the Nuclear Engineering and Radiological Sciences Departments at the University of Michigan. In late 2015 the University began a $12 million dollar renovation of the space, now designated as the "Nuclear Engineering Laboratory"

== Ford Nuclear Reactor Facts (1997) ==
=== Typical operating cycle ===
A typical full-power cycle consisted of 10 days at 2 MW followed by 4 days of shutdown maintenance, for a weekly average of 120 full-power hours. At this rate, 16 new fuel elements were required each year.

=== Specifications ===
- Reactor
  - Power: 2 MW
  - Moderator: Light water
  - Core Volume: 6 cubic feet (0.17 m^{3})
  - Lattice Configuration: Grid, 8 × 6
    - Standard: 41 elements
    - Control: 4 elements
  - Normal Average Thermal Power Density: 333.33 kW/ft^{3}
- Vessel
  - Vessel Pressure_{g}: 8.7 psi (60 kPa)
  - Vessel Temperature: 100 °F (38 °C)
- Fuel
  - Configuration: 18 curved fuel plates containing 0.167 kg of U-235.
  - Enrichment: 19.5%
  - Composition: UAl_{x} in 5214 Aluminum matrix
  - Clad Composition: 6061 Aluminum
  - Frequency of refueling: 3 elements and 1 control element every 5 months
  - Normal element lifetime: 900 MWd
- Thermal Hydraulics
  - Flow direction: Vertically down through core
  - Pump: 25 hp (19 kW) centrifugal pump and gravity
  - Normal flow rate: 1,000 US gallons (3,800 L) per minute
  - Normal inlet temperature: 43 °C (109 °F)
  - Normal temperature rise: 7-8 degrees (13.5-14.0 F)
- Operating Experience
  - Forced outages in past 5 years (in 1997)
    - Equipment Malfunction:39
    - Personnel Error: 7
- Past Modifications
  - Power increase: From 1 to 2 MW, August 5, 1963
  - Fuel conversion From U-Al to U-Al_{x}, November 1978
  - Enrichment change: from 93% to 19.5%, December 1981
- Experimental Facilities
  - Beamports: 10 horizontal
    - Thermal Neutron Flux: 1.0×10^{8} n/cm^{2}/s
    - Fast Neutron Flux': 1.0×10^{6} n/cm^{2}/s
    - Gamma Dose Rate: 1.0×10^{4} rad/h
  - Hot Cells: 2, One connected to reactor pool by waterlock.
  - Irradiation Racks: 3 spent fuel racks
    - Gamma dose rate: 4.5×10^{4} rad/h
  - Pneumatic Tubes:One on west core face
    - Thermal Neutron Flux: 2.0×10^{12} n/cm^{2}/s
    - Fast Neutron Flux': 2.0×10^{10} n/cm^{2}/s
  - Thermal Column: Inoperative (The reactor was built with a thermal column, to be a large source of thermal neutrons. However, the column began leaking early in its life and was put out of commission. )
- Principal isotopes produced: fluorine-18, chlorine-36, bromine-80, bromine-82, iodine-131, sodium-24, lanthanum-140, cesium-134m.

== Partial List of Publications from the FNR ==
- W. W. Meinke, "Pneumatic Tubes Speed Activation Analysis", Nucleonics 17, No. 9, 86-89, September 1959.
- C. W. Ricker and W. R. Dunbar, "FNR Shim-Safety Rod Deformations", Nuclear Science and Engineering, 9, No.3, March 1961.
- Billella, Gomberg, Gould, "Immunity of Mice to Schistosoma Mansoni", MM-PP-54-1, March 1961
- W. Wegst Jr., "Wavelength Dependent Effects of Low Energy X-Rays on Mammalian Tissue Cells, MMPP-196-2, April 1963.
- Bullock, Daniels, King, "A Reactor Core Modification to Enhance Beams for Thermal Neutron Spectrometers", Annual Meeting of the American Nuclear Society at Gatlinburg, TN, June 21–24, 1965.
- R. D. Martin, "Control-Rod Material Problems of Research Reactors", Nuclear Safety, 10, No. 1, 63-72, January 1969.
- Docket No. 50-2, "Safety Evaluation Report related to the renewal of the operating license of the training and research reactor at the University of Michigan", NUREG-1138, US NRC, July 1985.
- Reed Burn, "The U of Michigan's Ford Reactor and Phoenix Lab: Benefiting Humankind", Nuclear News, 65-69, June 1993.

== See also ==
- Neutron Science Laboratory
