= Artie Frecker =

Australian rules footballer, born 1901

Personal information
- Full name: Arthur Charles Frecker
- Born: 20 September 1901; Clifton Hill, Victoria
- Died: 13 January 1967 (aged 65); Yarram, Victoria
- Original team: Auburn
- Height: 170 cm (5 ft 7 in)
- Weight: 73 kg (161 lb)

Playing career^{1}
Years	Club	Games (Goals)
1930	Hawthorn	1 (0)
- ^{1} Playing statistics correct to the end of 1930.

Arthur Charles Frecker (20 September 1901 – 13 January 1967) was an Australian rules footballer who played for the Hawthorn Football Club in the Victorian Football League (VFL).
