= Mary Frecker =

American mechanical engineer

Mary Irene Frecker is an American mechanical engineer whose research focuses on topology optimization of adaptive structures, compliant mechanisms, and self-folding origami mechanisms, with applications including the design of medical devices. She is a professor of mechanical and biomechanical engineering in the Penn State College of Engineering, Riess Chair of Engineering, head of the mechanical engineering department, and director of the Penn State Center for Biodevices.

== Education and career ==
Frecker majored in mechanical engineering at the University of Dayton, graduating in 1991. She went to the University of Michigan for graduate study in mechanical engineering, earning a master's degree in 1994 and completing her Ph.D. in 1997. Her dissertation was Optimal design of compliant mechanisms, supervised by Noboru Kikuchi and Sridhar Kota.

She joined the Pennsylvania State University in 1997 as an assistant professor and the Pearce Endowed Development Professor in Mechanical Engineering. In 2020, she was named to the Leighton Riess Chair in Engineering and became the director of the Penn State Center for Biodevices. She was named as head of the Department of Mechanical Engineering, succeeding Karen Thole, in 2021.

== Recognition ==
Frecker was elected as an ASME Fellow in 2009. In 2021, the American Society of Mechanical Engineers gave her their Adaptive Structures and Material Systems Award.
