= Albert Pattengill =

American businessman

Albert H. Pattengill
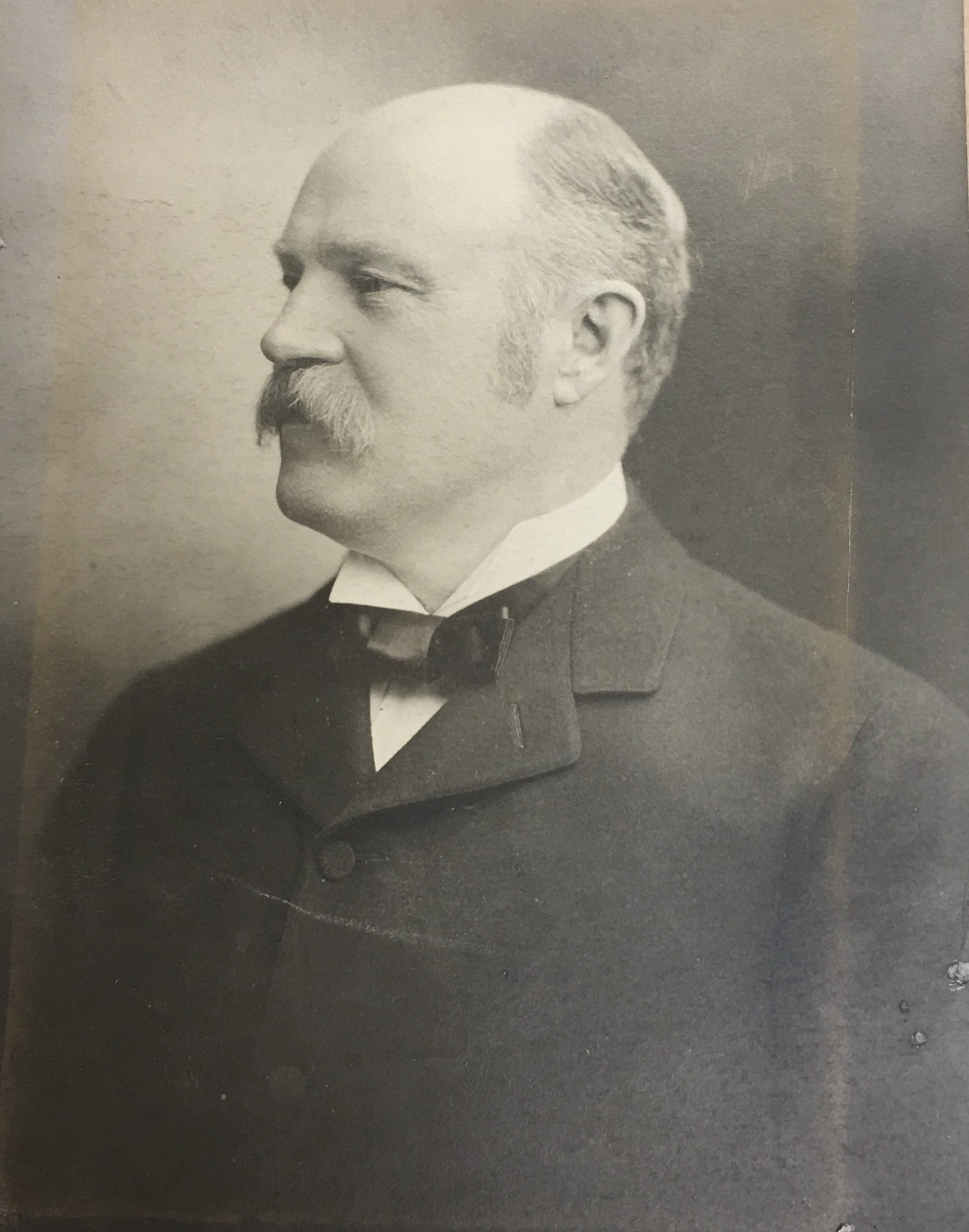
- Born: February 26, 1842; New Lisbon, New York, United States
- Died: March 16, 1906 (aged 64); Ann Arbor, Michigan
- Education: University of Michigan
- Occupations: Professor of Greek, Univ. of Michigan; Chairman, Western Inter-collegiate Conference; Chairman, Univ. of Michigan Board in Control of Athletics
- Employer: University of Michigan
- Spouses: Annie Warden Ekin (m. 1878; died 1879) Bessie E. West (m. 1895)

Albert Henderson Pattengill (February 26, 1842 – March 16, 1906) was an American professor of Greek. For 40 years, Pattengill was also a leader in athletics at the University of Michigan. He played on Michigan's 1867 baseball team and was part of a three-person committee that selected "azure-blue and maize" as the university's colors. He was also one of the leaders behind the formation and early development of the Big Ten Conference.

== Early years ==
Pattengill was born in 1842 on a farm near New Lisbon, New York, the son of John Scott Pattengill and Abigail Maria (Gregory) Pattengill. He entered the sophomore class at the University of Michigan in 1865 and received a bachelor's degree in 1868 and a master's degree in 1871. He served as the principal at Ann Arbor High School for a year after receiving his bachelor's degree.

== Professor of Greek ==
Pattengill joined the faculty at the University of Michigan in 1869 as an assistant professor of Greek and French. He spent the year 1878 studying at German universities and was offered a professorship in Greek at the University of Wisconsin in 1879, which he declined. Pattengill returned to Ann Arbor in 1879. In June 1881, the University Regents appointed Pattengill as an "Associate Professor of Greek, without present increase of Salary"—though his salary was increased in 1883 to $1,800. He was promoted to a full professorship of Greek in 1889. From 1895 to 1901, he was chairman of Michigan's Administrative Board of the Faculty.

== University of Michigan athletics ==
For 40 years, Pattengill was also a leader in athletics at the University of Michigan.

=== Student athlete and selection of the "maize and blue" ===
In February 1867 during Pattengill's junior year, he was selected by the literary department to be part of a three-person student committee to select colors for the university. At a meeting in the College Chapel on February 12, 1867, Pattengill's committee made the following report:

Your committee, appointed to select emblematic colors for our University, unanimously agree in presenting as their choice, Azure Blue and Maize, and recommend that the following resolution be adopted: 'Resolved, that Azure Blue and Maize be adopted as the emblematic colors of the University of Michigan.'

The resolution was adopted.

In 1867 Pattengill was also a starter on Michigan's baseball team—one of the first sports teams organized at the university. The team defeated Ann Arbor (30-26), Ypsilanti (42-12), Central Club of Jackson (43-15). In the final game of the season, the Michigan team played the Detroit Baseball Club, then the reigning Michigan state champions. With Pattengill playing in the outfield, the college team from Ann Arbor "pulled off a stunning upset," defeating the Detroit club by a score of 70 to 18.

Pattengill was also a member of the Alpha Delta Phi fraternity at Michigan.

=== Board of Athletic Control and the Western Conference ===
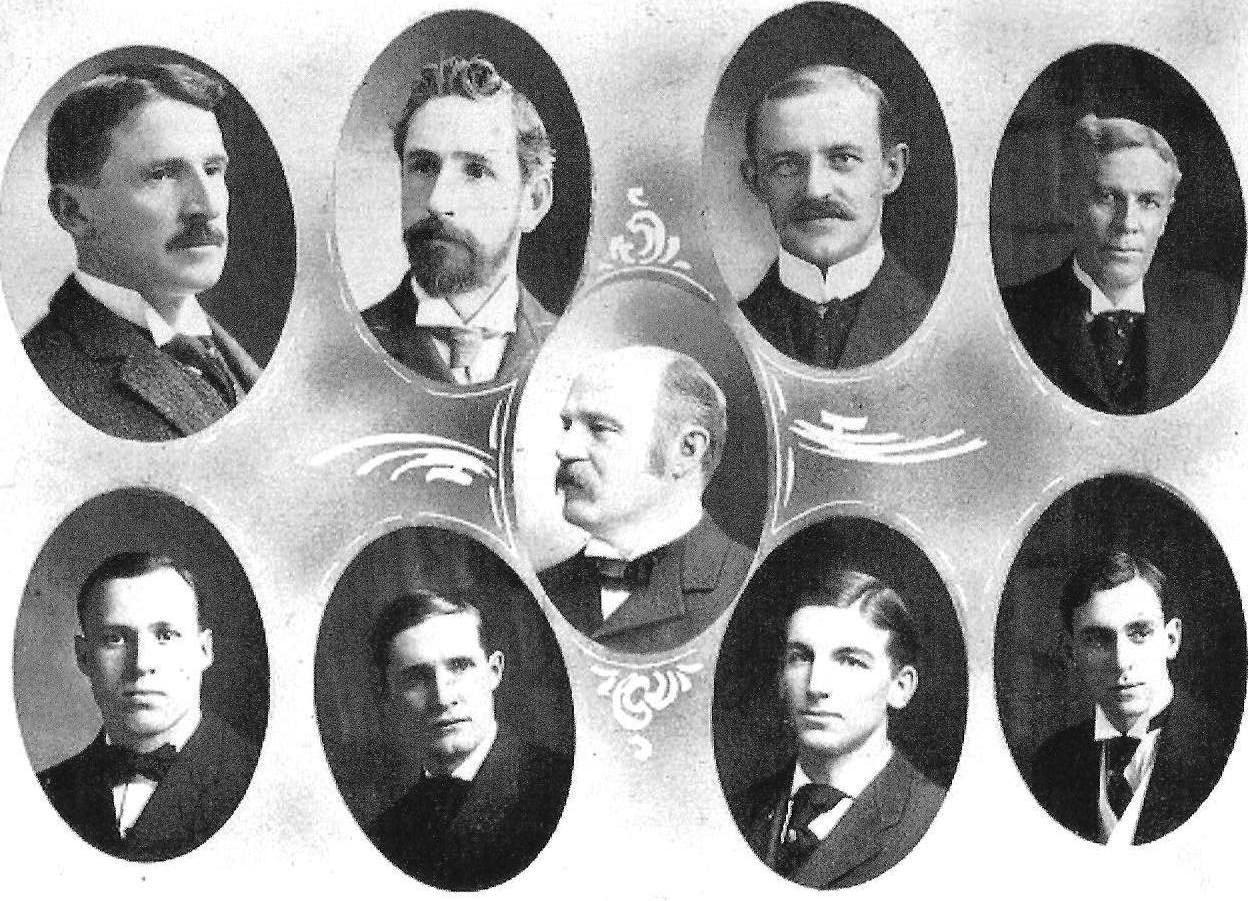
Michigan's 1905-06 Athletic Board of Control (Chairman Pattengill at center)

With the growing popularity of intercollegiate athletics in the early 1890s, the University of Michigan faculty in 1894 established a faculty Board in Control of Athletics. Pattengill was a member of the Athletic Board from the time of its formation, serving as its chairman from 1898 until the time of his death. He was also one of the leaders in the formation in 1896 of the Western Inter-Collegiate Athletic Conference (later known as the Big Ten Conference). The conference was composed of representatives from the athletic boards of seven leading Mid-Western universities, established with the goal of regulating and standardizing the conditions of inter-collegiate athletics and "to maintain a high ideal of amateurism in college sports." Professor Pattengill worked with Michigan's President James B. Angell on the formation of the conference and served as Michigan's faculty representative to the conference. He also served as Chairman of the Western Conference for a number of years.

=== 1900 and 1904 Olympic Games ===
In 1900, the United States had no organized team for the 1900 Summer Olympics. On learning that Michigan's rival, the University of Chicago, was sending a delegation of athletes to the games in Paris, Pattengill led a fundraising effort to send some of Michigan's best athletes to the games. The effort raised sufficient funds to send four Michigan athletes and trainer Keene Fitzpatrick to Paris. Michigan's John McLean won a silver medal in the high hurdles.

One of the highlights for Michigan athletics during the Pattengill's time as chairman of the Athletic Boards came at the 1904 Summer Olympics in St. Louis, which have sometimes been referred to as the "Michigan Olympics." Five University of Michigan track and field athletes won 9 medals: six gold, two silver, and one bronze. The Michigan medal winners were Archie Hahn (gold medals in the 60 meters, 100 meters, and 200 meters), Ralph Rose (gold medal in the shot put, silver medal in the discus, and bronze medal in the hammer throw), Charles Dvorak (gold medal in the pole vault), Fred Schule (gold medal in the 110-meter hurdles), and William Coe (silver medal in the shot put).

=== Football dominance ===
It was also during Pattengill's time as chairman of the Athletic Board that Michigan played the first game in the Michigan – Ohio State rivalry in 1897, a game that Michigan won 34-0, and won its first Western Conference football championship in 1898, prompting Louis Elbel to compose Michigan's fight song, "The Victors." In 1901, Pattengill and athletic director Charles A. Baird hired Fielding H. Yost as the school's football coach. Yost's first Michigan team in 1901 outscored its opposition by a margin of 550-0 en route to a perfect season and victory in the inaugural Rose Bowl on January 1, 1902. Before Michigan finally lost a game to Amos Alonzo Stagg's University of Chicago squad at the end of the 1905 season, they had gone 56 straight games without a defeat, the second longest such streak in college football history. From 1901 to 1905, Michigan outscored its opponents 2,821 to 42, earning the nickname as the "Point-a-Minute" teams.

=== Controversy and the Angell Conference ===
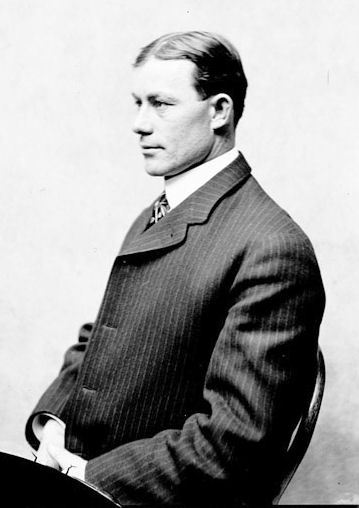
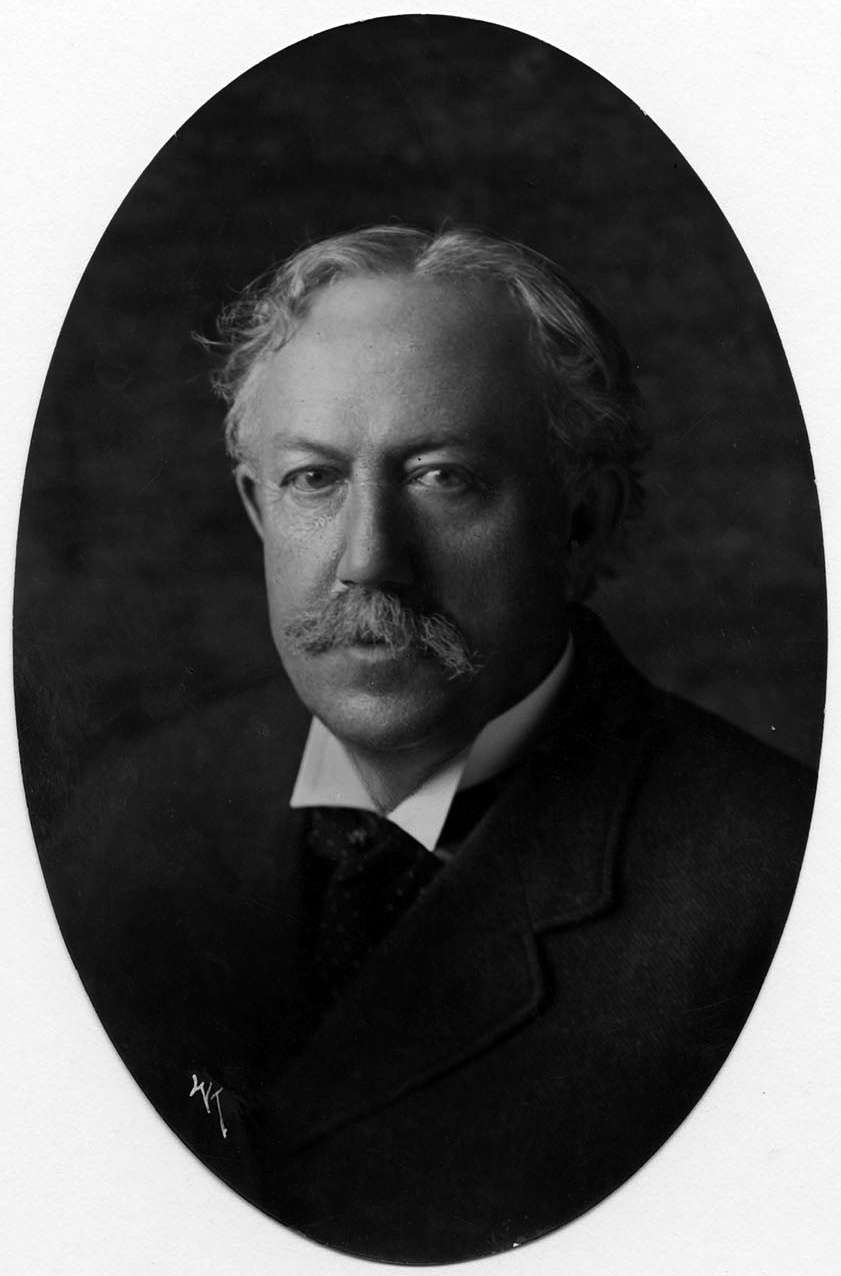
Pattengill defended the integrity of Michigan football coach Fielding H. Yost (left) in response to charges from David Starr Jordan (right)

In 1905, Pattengill became embroiled in the national scandal over violence and professionalism in college football, a controversy that led to proposals to ban football from college campuses. In the fall of 1905, Stanford University President David Starr Jordan, wrote a series of articles in Collier's making allegations of "professionalism" at several universities, including Michigan, Chicago and Wisconsin. Jordan described Fielding Yost as the "czar of Michigan's system" and accused him of traveling across the country "soliciting expert players" who were not true student athletes. One week after Jordan's article attacking Yost was published, Michigan's four-year unbeaten streak ended in the last game of the season, a 2-0 loss to rival Chicago. Pattengill defended Yost, saying, "We have never had a coach who has caused us so little trouble as has Mr. Yost. When one of the Michigan players has been declared ineligible, he has never complained or sought to find a loop-hole of escape, as coaches before him too often have done. He has simply taken the men who were eligible and played them."

The controversy surrounding college football continued in December 1905, as Eastern football expert Caspar Whitney wrote that the problems at Michigan, Minnesota and Wisconsin were due to "crooked alumni, flabby facilities, and coaches looking for reputations", and asserted that if Pattengill of Michigan, Vann Hise of Wisconsin and Northrop of Minnesota "had any backbone such conditions would not exist." Michigan President James Angell called for a reform conference on football. Angell sent Pattengill as Michigan's representative at the conference, and the press reported on Pattengill's departure as follows:

"Professor Albert H. Pattengill, chairman of the Western intercollegiate conference and head of the faculty board of athletic control at the University of Michigan has been appointed by President James B. Angell, as Michigan's representative at the special conference on foot ball, called by Dr. Angell. The appointment pleased the student body, as Prof. Pattengill is most popular, especially since he defended Michigan's policy in the Schulte affair at Thanksgiving."

The conference (known as the Angell Conference) was held in Chicago from January to March 1906 and resulted in a series of reform resolutions, including placing university faculty in charge of gate receipts, a prohibition on summer training and the "training table," and a limit on the admission price to college athletic events to a maximum of fifty cents. A further resolution prohibited member schools from using professional coaches, a resolution that was seen as a direct attack on Michigan's highly paid football coach Fielding Yost. Pattengill was unsuccessful in stopping the passage of what became known as the Yost Resolution—a resolution that was partly responsible for Michigan's decade-long withdrawal from the conference.

Pattengill, who had been suffering from a weak heart, died less than a week after returning from the final session of the Angell Conference in Chicago.

=== Patengill's legacy ===
The 1906 University of Michigan yearbook, the Michiganensian, included a full page memorial to Pattengill which touched on his contributions to the school's athletic programs:

"For the last ten years his most significant work outside of the class-room was in the direction and control of Athletics. As chairman of the Board in Control he devoted untiring energy to the betterment of athletic conditions, to encouraging a spirit of manliness and fair play and to looking after and solving justly the perplexing problems that constantly arose. The value of his influence and his strong, honest personality cannot be easily overestimated. Thus in many ways the life of a vigorous man was wrought into the life of our university. It is a comfort to remember that the influence of his character on its destinies is undying."

In a later tribute to Pattengill, the Michigan Alumnus called Professor Pattengill "A Modern Greek" and praised his dedication to athletics:

It is surely not inappropriate to mention here, also, Professor Pattengill's long service in a field far apart, these days, from the Greek studies he loved -- collegiate athletics. But could anything be in more harmony with the finest traditions of Greek culture than Professor Pattengill's efforts for the establishment of collegiate and intercollegiate athletics on a high plane of sportsmanship and essential manliness? He was a tower of strength through the earlier days of Michigan's athletic history; to him, more than to any other one man, must be ascribed the inception and success of the Western Conference.

In his 1920 history of the university, Wilfred Byron Shaw also paid tribute to Pattengill for his leadership role in the establishment of athletics at Michigan: "Professor Pattengill's interest in outdoor sports was lifelong. He was the moving spirit in the [Western] Conference through many years; and to him, more than to any other, Michigan owes, not only the present effective organization of athletics, but the securing of Ferry Field and its equipment."

== Family and death ==
Pattengill married Annie Warden Ekin (U-M Class of 1876) in February 1878; she died 17 months later in November 1879, "having been preceded to the grave by an infant son." Pattengill remarried in 1895, taking Bessie E. West as his wife at a ceremony in Grand Rapids, Michigan on June 26, 1895.

Patengill died suddenly at his home in Ann Arbor in March 1906; the cause of death was reported as "heart trouble." In his obituary, a legend concerning Pattengill's baseball hitting ability was recounted:

"To this day the students relate a tradition as to how he batted a home-run once from a point 100 feet south of North University avenue, so that the sphere landed on the skylight on top of the old medical building. Professional baseball players have looked at the distance and disputed it, but the tradition stands, nonetheless."

Following Pattengill's death, the filing for probate of his will revealed that he had accumulated an estate worth $10,000. This prompted the Detroit Journal to publish an article on the "Lot of the College Professor" which included the following comments:

The filing for probate of the will of Prof. Albert H. Pattengill of the university of Michigan revealed the existence of an estate valued at $10,000. This is the net remuneration for a life of 64 years devoted to the most exacting, intellectually arduous of skilled labor, profound scholarship. What Prof. Pattengill's estate might have been had he devoted the intellect, force, persistence and energy that he abundantly demonstrated in his career to those professions or activities whose ideal if flatly the accumulation of wealth makes interesting speculation. ... Prof. Pattengill was much more than senior professor of Greek. He was a classicist and an educator of national reputation. ... Does the spectacle of such a reward as this induce the student deliberately to choose the career of scholar with its dignified penury in these days of great salaries and satisfying dividends? ... Pray what other highly skilled specialists of such elaborate training and rare intellectual gifts are given such niggardly return? The faculty of the university of Michigan is a little more grievously underpaid than other institutions, but not by much. It is the tendency of the times to overlook the modest needs of the scholar in the rush after ideals that are overtaken by daring.

The Albert Pattengill House, a Dutch Colonial Revival home built for Pattengill in 1896 and located at 1405 Hill Street in Ann Arbor, is now part of the Washtenaw Hill Historic District.
