= Wilfred Byron Shaw =

American author and sketch artist (1880–1959)

- Born: January 10, 1880; Adrian, Michigan, U.S.
- Died: May 28, 1959 (aged 79); Ann Arbor, Michigan, U.S.
- Education: University of Michigan
- Occupations: Writer, sketch artist
- Spouse: Marion B. Dickinson (died 1958)
- Children: 2

Wilfred Byron Shaw (January 10, 1880 – May 28, 1959) was an American writer and sketch artist.

== Early life ==
He was born on January 10, 1880 in Adrian, Michigan, to Byron L. Shaw (1843–1933) and Olive Stockwell (1842–1919).

His father's brother was the farmer and artist Horatio Shaw.

== Education ==
Shaw graduated from the University of Michigan in 1904. He also attended art school in Chicago.

== Career ==
=== University administration ===
Soon after graduation, he was named the general secretary of the Alumni Association (a job he held until 1929) and editor of the Michigan Alumnus. In 1909, he accompanied President Harry Burns Hutchins (and other UM employees) on a trip to Chicago, Des Moines, and Omaha, to meet with UM alumni.

In 1912, he was part of the committee who approved maize and blue as official University of Michigan colors.

In 1913, he helped to organize the Association of Alumni Secretaries.

In 1929, he was appointed director of alumni relations, a position that the Regents established for continuing education and other services to graduates. He retired from this position in 1951.

=== Art ===
Shaw was a sketch artist, often drawing university buildings for inclusion in The Ann Arbor News. Sixteen of his drawings are owned by the University of Michigan Museum of Art. His portrait of Fred Newton Scott is owned by the National Portrait Gallery.

He was also known for drawing caricatures of his colleagues. These are currently in storage at the Bentley Historical Library.

He also designed the logo for the University of Michigan's "atomic research center," the "Phoenix Project," in 1948.

=== Writing ===
In 1918, Shaw published James Burrill Angell and the University of Michigan.

In 1920, Harcourt, Brace, and Howe published his book The University of Michigan, about the history of the university.

In 1934, Shaw founded and served as the first editor of the Michigan Alumnus Quarterly Review.

In 1936, he published "A Bibliography of the University of Michigan."

== Personal life ==
He married Marion B. Dickinson (1883–1958), and they had two children, Brackley Shaw (1913–1996) and Penelope Shaw (1921–1996).

Shaw died on May 28, 1959 in Ann Arbor, Michigan.
