= Order of Angell =

Honor society at University of Michigan, US

- Founded: 1901; 125 years ago University of Michigan
- Type: Honor
- Former affiliation: Independent
- Status: Defunct
- Defunct date: February 22, 2021
- Emphasis: Senior
- Scope: Local
- Chapters: 1
- Nickname: Tribe
- Former name: Michigamua
- Headquarters: Ann Arbor, Michigan; United States

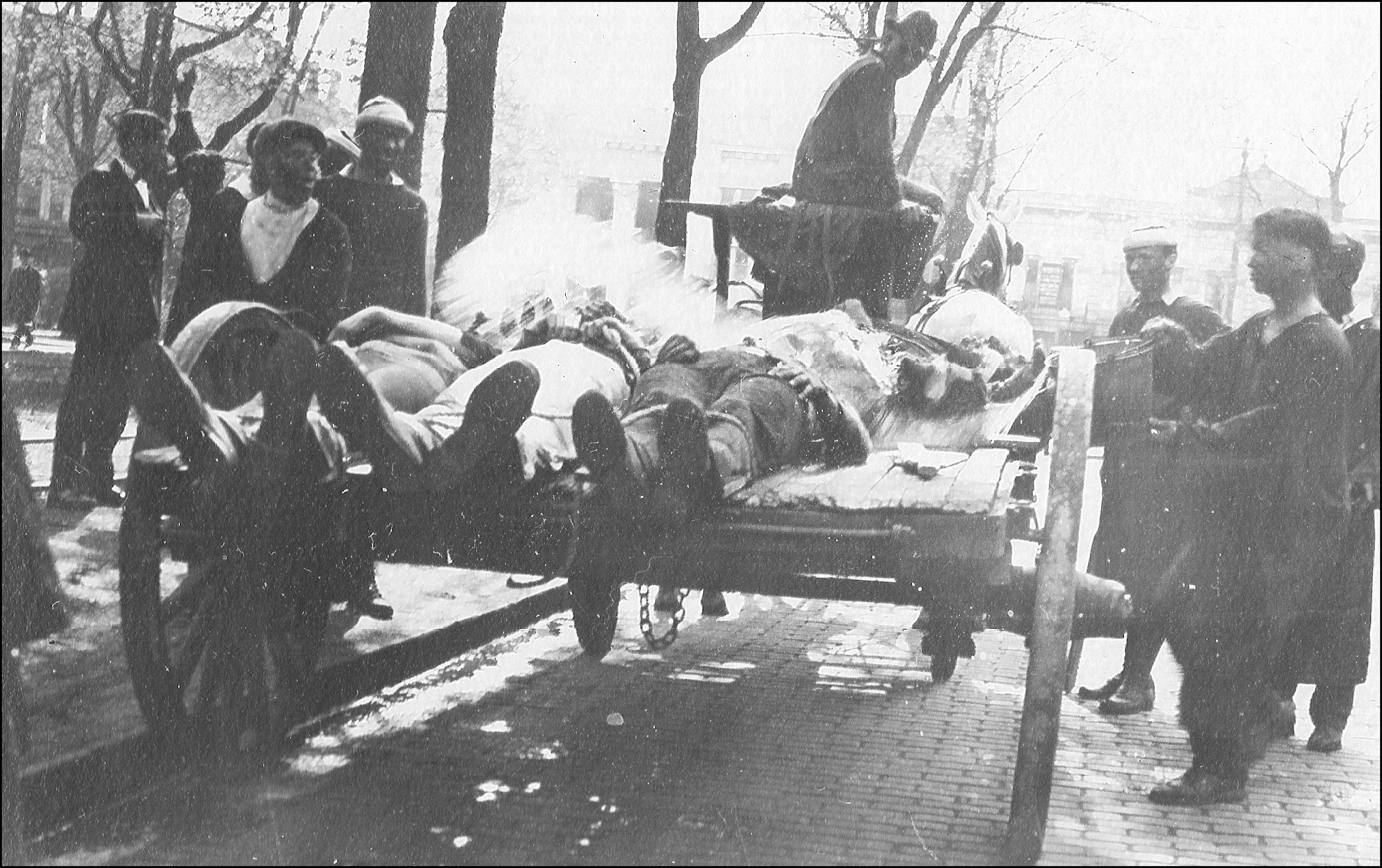
Michigamua hazing ritual, 1924.jpg

The Order of Angell, known for decades as Michigamua, was a senior honorary society recognizing student leaders and outstanding athletes at the University of Michigan. For most of its history, its practices reflected images of Native Americans drawn from Euro-American popular culture. From Michigamua's founding in 1901 until the 1970s, membership was a badge of distinction. From the 1970s on, the society drew rising criticism for admitting only men; for the form of cultural appropriation known as "playing Indian;" and for possessing Native American artifacts.

By 1999, when women were first admitted, the organization had discarded many of its faux-Native American references and practices. But in 2000, protesters took over the group's headquarters and demanded its ouster from the campus. Soon afterward, Michigamua lost its official recognition and its meeting room. In 2006-07 it reorganized as the Order of Angell with a vow to foster diversity and draw its members from the broadest possible array of candidates. But critics continued to denounce the Order on the grounds of its secrecy, elitism, and origins in Michigamua. In February 2021, after several current and former BIPOC members of the organization urged that the Order of Angell be dissolved, the active members disbanded the society and declared that it should never be reconstituted.

== History ==
=== Founding and early years ===
The founding of Michigamua in 1901 stemmed in part from a sharp rise in the number of students at Michigan, from some 1,500 in the 1880s to 4,500 by 1910. With the dilution of close relations between students and faculty, students sought community in organizations of their own, including fraternities and sororities, dramatic and musical societies, publications, and athletic teams. Honorary societies arose to recognize the leaders of these groups.

In the academic year 1900-1901, 15 students in a philosophy course taught by Professor Robert Mark Wenley formed the Hot Air Club, a social group that soon declared itself a formal society of seniors that would take, as a founder put it, "an Indian tribe as the means of expression and the name Michigamua." Members believed "Michigamua" was the name of an actual indigenous tribe of the Great Lakes region and the state's namesake. There was no such tribe, though the state's name is indeed a variant of the Ojibwe word gichigami or michigami, meaning "large water".

The founders were inspired by novels featuring senior societies at Eastern colleges. The best known included three at Yale (Skull and Bones, founded 1832; Scroll and Key, founded 1842; and Wolf's Head, founded 1884). Other such groups had emerged at Cornell, Dartmouth, Columbia, and the University of Pennsylvania, among others.

Members defined the group's mission as to "fight like hell for Michigan and Michigamua," which meant simply that Michigamua regarded itself as an embodiment of "school spirit", to use the expression then coming into vogue. As on other campuses, allegiance to one's university or college as a whole was promoted as a corrective to the rancorous loyalties to one's class or academic unit that often provoked rowdy and violent "rushes". Promoting school spirit also partook of the boosterism common to U.S. cities and towns in the 19th and early 20th centuries.

Michigamua maintained its prestige and remained largely free of controversy through the 1960s. Several factors helped it to thrive in the long term. One was the practice of recruiting honorary "sachems" from among the university's administrators, prominent faculty and athletic directors, and coaches. These included members of the governing board of regents; four presidents of the university (Harry Burns Hutchins, Alexander Grant Ruthven, Harlan Hatcher and Robben W. Fleming); and the varsity football coaches Fielding H. Yost, Fritz Crisler and Bo Schembechler. Connections to the university's upper echelons helped to cement Michigamua's place in campus culture. Close contacts also were maintained with upper-level administrators, especially T. Hawley Tapping, head of the university's alumni association from the 1930s through the 1950s, and John Feldkamp, "sachem" of Michigamua in 1960-61 and director of the university's housing office from 1966 to 1977.

Michigamua's longevity also was supported by an alumni body, the "Old Braves Council," which was founded shortly after World War II. With so many male students in the armed forces, the group's wartime rosters dwindled. Then the campus was swamped with military veterans, older on average than students of pre-war years and less interested in undergraduate traditions. So Frederick C. Matthaei, a member of the university's governing board and an honorary sachem, worked with his son, Frederick C. Matthaei Jr., a member of the "tribe", to recruit a full complement of "fighting braves" for 1946-47 and to start a board of alumni to advise new members on traditions, plan alumni gatherings and raise money for the upkeep of the "wigwam". (Michigamua began to hold some of its activities on Matthaei property a few miles from the university's campus. A totem pole dedicated to Michigamua was erected on the property. In 1957 and 1961, Matthaei donated the acreage to the university; it became the site of the Matthaei Botanical Gardens and the Radrick Farm golf course.)

=== Challenges and responses, 1970s-1999 ===
In the 1970s, critics began to challenge Michigamua's privileged status. Women argued that the university's support violated federal rules against sex discrimination. Native Americans cited state and federal protections against racial bias. The complaints prompted Michigamua to make concessions that changed elements of the organization but preserved its recognition as a sanctioned student body through the 1990s.

The earliest legal complaint came in 1972 from a chapter of American Indians Unlimited (AIU) led by Victoria Barner, a Michigan graduate student and member of the Nisga'a tribe of British Columbia. Addressing the Michigan Civil Rights Commission, Barner called Rope Day "demeaning and insulting to the Indian culture and heritage." By sanctioning Michigamua, the university permitted "our culture to be distorted and ridiculed because of our race and national origin". Replying to Barner, members of Michigamua said the "tribe" was "based on principles that reject any insulting or offensive actions" and promised to "eliminate all public actions of our organization". The commission ordered Michigamua to stop "playing Indian" in public. From then on, the "tribe" initiated new members without spectators at the university's off-campus Radrick Farm property. Meetings in the "wigwam" continued. Later cadres were reported to have "played Indian" in public, breaking the pledge to operate solely in private.

In 1976, Michigamua's males-only tradition came under fire from two women students associated with the university's student government, the Michigan Student Assembly (MSA). They were Amy Blumenthal, MSA's vice president, and Anita Tanay, a former member. Blumenthal and Tanay asserted that by providing facilities and aid to the all-male Michigamua — including its rent-free room in the Union, special privileges to use Radrick Farm, and alleged favoritism in access to football tickets — the university was violating Title IX of the U.S. Education Amendments of 1972, which forbade gender discrimination by educational institutions that received federal funding.

A stand-off ensued among Michigamua, the university, and the U.S. Department of Health, Education and Welfare (HEW, later the U.S. Department of Health and Human Services), which then administered Title IX. The issue turned in part on whether Michigamua was an honorary society or a social fraternity. If the former, its single-sex nature would violate Title IX. If the latter, it could stay males-only, since Title IX specifically excluded social fraternities and sororities from its purview. While HEW considered the complaint, university administers decided Michigamua was indeed an honorary society and offered the "tribe" three options — 1) admit women; 2) abandon its status as a recognized student organization and leave the campus; or 3) declare itself a social fraternity and abide by the rules that governed other such organizations, which would likely end its exclusive use of the "wigwam". Michigamua said it would accept only some version of the third option. The university deferred action pending HEW's ruling.

In 1979, more than three years after Blumenthal and Tanay's complaint, HEW ruled the university had violated Title IX by recognizing Michigamua as a student group and providing a space to meet, thus rejecting the university's claim that Michigamua was independent of the university. HEW also noted that Michigamua was widely understood to be an honorary society, not a social fraternity, so it was subject to Title IX's ban on gender discrimination. The university was ordered to enforce changes in Michigamua or risk a loss of federal funding.

Students and administrators worked out a compromise. They would establish the Tower Society, a new honorary organization with two parts — Michigamua for men and Adara (later renamed Phoenix) for leading women students. Michigamua would continue to meet in the "wigwam" while Adara would meet in a room one floor below, and the two groups would hold regular joint meetings. (The Vulcans engineering honorary would later join the Tower Society, with a meeting room two floors below the "wigwam".)

This arrangement satisfied HEW but not Michigamua's critics, especially Native American students. One of them, Grace Pego, had filed a separate civil-rights claim in 1976 shortly after Blumenthal and Tanay made their Title IX complaint. Pego asserted that Michigamua — and thus the university, by supporting it— was violating an amendment to the federal Civil Rights Act of 1964 "by denying membership to minorities and ridiculing Native American culture." The university deflected federal action by pointing to Michigamua's induction of numerous African Americans and citing the group's assertion that it "holds the American Indian in the highest esteem." But Native American students and their non-native supporters would echo Pego's complaint in the coming years, insisting that Michigamua's traditions made a racist mockery of native cultures.

Confronted with such complaints, members of Michigamua usually invoked either of two points of view. Older alumni, echoing the founders, typically argued that Michigamua honored Native Americans. Younger members were more likely to say that critics were mistaking Michigamua's practices as commentary on actual Native Americans, when in fact the "tribe" had crafted a subculture of its own out of pop-culture Indian caricatures. The Michigan Daily quoted an unnamed member of the 1975 cadre as saying: "Michigamua — unfortunately, maybe — has adopted things from the grade-B movies on TV. I don't think anybody in Michigamua considers them to be Indian. It's always Michigamua tradition, Michigamua lore, an identity of Michigamua rather than Indian."

From the 1970s through the 1990s, Michigamua continued to induct new cadres, but its standing had declined. With the departure of Rope Day from the central campus, many Michigan students were no longer even aware of the organization. It also came under scrutiny for hazing activities banned by the Michigan Student Assembly.

In 1988, two new blows challenged Michigamua's grip on its traditions. The Michigan Student Assembly voted to withdraw its recognition of Michigamua as an approved student organization, citing critics' charges of racism and elitism. And the Michigan Civil Rights Commission warned the state's universities that any use of Indian names, logos, or mascots violated state civil rights laws.

In response, Michigamua promised in 1989 to drop nearly all faux-Native American references. Henceforth its rituals and nomenclature would refer only to University of Michigan traditions. Members would be called "fighting wolves" — a reference to the university's team name, the Wolverines — instead of "fighting braves". The group would refer to itself as a "pride" rather than a "tribe". There would be no more "Injun talk" in meetings. Only one explicit reference to Native Americans would remain — the name Michigamua itself, with its echo of the Ojibwe language. With these concessions, the group regained recognition as an approved student organization and fended off state penalties.

In the 1990s, Michigamua tried to adjust to a new era in which multiculturalism and gender equality had been embraced as governing principles. By the late 1990s, each class included at least a few members who identified as progressive. The greatest change came in 1999 when, under pressure from university officials who had rethought Title IX's applicability to single-sex student organizations, Michigamua admitted its first women members.

=== Tower occupation and aftermath ===
Complaints about Michigamua and racism persisted. The university's Native American Student Association (NASA) asserted that "playing Indian" remained a part of the group's identity, at least in its name and publications, and that the group continued to improperly possess authentic tribal artifacts. In the spring of 1999, Native American students submitted requests to the administration that echoed earlier demands — better efforts to recruit Native students and faculty; a Native American studies program; courses in the Anishinaabe language; and the end of all recognition of Michigamua. Those demands set the stage for a major escalation in the long-running conflict.

On February 6, 2000, some 20 members of a new group, the Students of Color Coalition (SCC), gained access to the "wigwam" and announced they would stay until the university ejected Michigamua from the campus. University officials allowed a few protesters to remain pending a resolution of the dispute.

The protest attracted significant attention on campus and in the local press. Protesters extracted Native American artifacts — some authentic, some faux-Indian souvenirs — from a storage space in the "wigwam" and displayed them on Michigamua's meeting table, then invited people in to view the materials. Rallies were held in support of NASA's demands. After a report of the occupation appeared in the New York Times, the civil-rights activist Al Sharpton announced plans to visit Ann Arbor to support the protesters.

Spokesmen for Michigamua responded to the occupation by saying the current cadre of members wanted to fully understand the protesters' grievances and remedy past wrongs. "The space is the secondary issue," said Rishi Moudgil, a leader among the members. "The pain is the primary issue... We are questioning what has happened in the past. We don't want to make the same mistakes." Members apologized for offending Native Americans and said they had never seen, let alone put on display, the Native American objects now on public view. The objects had been stored unseen in an attic, they said, and they agreed to hand them over to university officials. Michigamua alumni took the blame, telling reporters they should have removed the objects from the Union long before. Members held firm on retaining their space in the tower but offered to have it renovated under the supervision of a Native American elder.

Joe Reilly, a Michigan senior, Native American activist, and spokesman for the protesters, asserted that Michigamua had lost its credibility by breaking past promises and dragging its heels in making changes. Protesters said they would meet only with top officials of the university.

Ten days after the occupation began, the university's president, Lee Bollinger, addressed the protesters' grievances. Michigamua's agreement to turn over native artifacts to the university had put that particular matter to rest, he said. Otherwise, he said, the university would not disallow one student group because its activities offended another; the question must go to the student government, which alone held the power to recognize student groups. As for Michigamua's claim on space in the Union Tower, Bollinger said, that merited review by a neutral committee.

As critics and supporters of the occupation traded views in the press, the occupation continued. Sharpton, appearing before SCC supporters, rebuked Bollinger for his claim that Michigamua enjoyed First Amendment protections. "You have a right to call me a n*****," Sharpton said, "but you don't have the right to make me pay for it. We're talking about a permanent use of this tower that's subsidized by public funds."

After 37 days, protesters left the "wigwam" with only one key issue resolved — native materials were turned over to the university's Museum of Natural History. Soon afterward, members voted to change the organization's name to "Michigamua: New Traditions for a New Millenium" and offered to renovate the "wigwam" to remove all native references. But the latter point became moot when the university ruled that no student group should enjoy exclusive access to the tower rooms and ordered Michigamua, Adara, and Vulcans to vacate their rooms. The student government voted again to terminate Michigamua's status as a recognized student organization. The group continued to meet in private quarters off campus and to initiate new members.

The stand-off between Michigamua and its critics continued for several years. Protesters demanded the group be extinguished. Once again, Michigamua said it had ended all practices to which opponents objected except the retention of its name. Efforts were made to further diversify its membership by race, gender, sexual orientation, and political ideology; some students who were invited to join refused to do so, citing the group's controversial past. Early in 2006, three progressive student organizations ousted members who had joined Michigamua. Heated debate culminated in Michigamua's announcement in April 2006 that it would undertake a thorough reorganization and choose a new name.

=== Order of Angell ===
In February 2007, members announced that Michigamua would become the Order of Angell, a name selected to honor James Burrill Angell, president of Michigan from 1871 to 1909, renowned for building Michigan into a leading public university. They apologized for Michigamua's use of Native American themes and artifacts. Like Michigamua, the Order would select new members from the ranks of student leaders, but with increased efforts to ensure diversity. Rosters would be made public. Their aim would be "to bridge the communication gap between the many groups on campus, to help U-M realize the potential of its diverse reputation." Its first "prexy", or president, was Sirene Abou-Chakra, a Lebanese-American student who led the Arab-American Student Association. Other members included the woman president of the Michigan Student Assembly; the leader of Army ROTC; and the co-captain of the men's varsity football team. "Our diversity is our strength," said Andrew Yahkind, the Jewish leader of the LSA Student Government. "I would not have joined this organization if I saw anything that was remotely insensitive." The Order sought and received recognition as an official student organization. Meetings were held in various locations. The old tower meeting space remained closed.

In 2009, the Order of Angell started Leaders for Life, an annual program aimed at fostering leadership skills among 100 invited sophomores and juniors. Each year until 2019, prominent figures spoke to the question: "Knowing what you know now, what advice would you give to student leaders?" Participants included three presidents of the university; Michigan's governor; varsity football coaches; and leaders of businesses, community-welfare organizations, and arts groups. In 2012, Leaders for Life surveyed some 1,200 student leaders of roughly 300 student organizations on campus to identify traits that make for effective leadership among college students. A follow-up survey in 2016 surveyed some 8,000 recent Michigan graduates to see if the traits identified in the initial survey were helpful after graduation.

Members met for weekly discussions and encouraged constructive campus activities without officially sponsoring them. One example was Dance Marathon, a non-profit student organization that staged a major annual fundraising event for children with disabilities and serious illnesses. Another was K-grams, a mentoring program that matched Michigan students with elementary-school students in southeastern Michigan, most notably with a pen-pal project that fostered monthly correspondence between mentors and their mentees.

For several years, the Order of Angell operated with little controversy. Then, in the 2010s, several student groups began to object if their members joined the Order, citing its ancestral ties to Michigamua or its reputation for secrecy or both. Some students declined invitations. Then, in 2019, three student organizations — the United Asian American Organizations, La Casa (a Latinx group), and the renamed Arab Student Association — denounced the Order and forbade its members to join it, saying, as the Arab Student Association put it, "an honest platform for diversity, inclusion, and transparency cannot be built on a foundation of the oppression of the Native community."

Members defended the Order, saying its roster and mission were matters of public record and that roughly half its members were students of color and roughly half women. They also acknowledged past wrongs committed by Michigamua.

Early in 2021, current members of the Order told alumni by email they were considering disbanding the organization for good and solicited advice. According to the Michigan Daily, the email reported many problems in the 2020-21 academic year, including restrictions on face-to-face meetings during the COVID-19 pandemic. The email read in part: "Dealing with being labeled as racists on social media, the internal push for further reforms, and the inability to engage in oral and in-person traditions have eroded confidence in selecting another Pride."

The Daily reported a letter sent to the Order by current and past members who identified as BIPOC. The signatories urged the current members to disband the Order or, failing that, to implement reform measures that would include "a public-facing truth-telling of the history of Order" and cutting all ties to pre-2006 alumni. Since the reorganization of 2006, they said, the Order had failed to "engage in truth, reconciliation, or healing" or "address the deep, systemic fibers of white supremacy that form the foundation of the organization... The power within the organization was always with white students, backed by a powerful cadre of alumni who pulled strings within the Pride." In meetings, they charged, "students of color often faced a hostile environment riddled with microaggressions and tokenism".

In March 2021, the Order announced its decision to disband. Members acknowledged predecessors' efforts to "rectify past harm by eliminating traditions rooted in Indigenous cultural appropriation, changing the name from Michigamua to Order of Angell, and attempting to open conversation channels with communities who expressed dissent to Order's continued existence." But the group's "historical lack of transparency and sufficient action" made it impossible to carry out its "core mission to make the Michigan campus a better place for students." The letter concluded: "In the strongest terms possible, we condemn any attempts to keep the organization alive in secret, restart the group, or build a new one that seeks to erase the history of the Order of Angell."

== Native American themes ==
Michigamua was not unusual among fraternal organizations in drawing motifs from an idealized past but it was unusual among college honorary societies in its use of Native American themes. White Americans had been masquerading as Indians for various purposes since before the American Revolution. The colonists who posed as Mohawks in the Boston Tea Party of 1773 are only the best remembered of many Americans of the colonial and early national eras who rebelled against authority in Indian costume. A few groups evolved into political organizations, such as the Tammany societies of Philadelphia and New York, named for a Lenape [Delaware] chief named Tamanend. Other Indian-themed groups were purely fraternal, such as the Society of Red Men and its successor, the Improved Order of Red Men. Members found community and camaraderie in gatherings that partook of secret rituals, names, hierarchies and costumes drawn from European-American depictions of Native American life — all elements that would characterize Michigamua from its origins until the late 20th century.

For inspiration, members of Michigamua's founding "tribe" searched the university library for ethnographic research and imaginative literature about indigenous peoples. Many such writings embraced the white image of Native Americans as "noble savages" living in harmony with nature and representing the inherent goodness of human beings untainted by European-American civilization. Other writings emphasized Indians' supposed courage and fierceness. Both sets of ideas informed Michigamua's ethos.

== Symbols and traditions ==
"Playing Indian" formed the core of Michigamua's identity. Members took faux-Indian nicknames betokening some physical or personal trait (for example, "Heap Chatter" for a talkative member) or activity ("Thunder Arm" for a baseball pitcher). They were expected to use the pidgin English (for example, "me heap big chief") that had evolved in early transactions between English speakers and Native Americans, then was absorbed and modified in the "western" novels and movies of white popular culture. Linguists called the dialect "Native American Pidgin English" and "Hollywood Injun Pidgin." It bore little if any relation to the actual languages of Native American nations.

Each cadre elected a "sachem" (president), "sagamore" (vice president), "keeper of the wampum" (treasurer), and "wiskinski" (secretary). Titles were drawn from New York's Society of St. Tammany (better known as Tammany Hall) and the Improved Order of Red Men.

Michigamua became well known chiefly through rites of initiation held before crowds of spectators every spring. The event was called "Rope Day." Junior men chosen as new members —"young bucks" — would be summoned to a central spot on the campus where the senior members — "fighting braves" — wearing faux-Indian costumes, with their skin stained red, would tie initiates' wrists to a long rope, then run them through the campus and subject them to physical ordeals, including being doused with water and smeared with red brick dust.

Hazing on Rope Day varied in severity. One member reported in 1919 that "Rope Day used to be very impressive...unique and picturesque. But it...has degenerated until it has become the worst offender in the way of brutal and barbaric tortures." Early initiates were often "paddled" — struck repeatedly on the buttocks with a wooden paddle. Later cadres scaled back the ordeals. The smearing of red brick dust on the skin of initiates — an example of "redface" practices, which are widely castigated by Native Americans and others as the equivalent of demeaning "blackface" caricatures of Africans and African-Americans — continued into the post-World War II era.

Michigamua was often called a secret society. That was true in some senses and some periods but not in others. Meetings were private, and in some periods officers' names were kept confidential. But on Rope Day, members' identities were obvious to large crowds of spectators, and the student newspaper and yearbook often published members' names.

== Wigwam ==
Until the early 1920s, members met in fraternities or rooms above stores. Then, for a nominal fee, the Michigan Union (whose top officers often belonged to the "tribe") permitted Michigamua to meet in the room at the top of the Union tower. (Other student groups, including the honor societies Druids and Vulcans, also rented space in the tower.) In the early 1930s, with the backing of Fielding Yost, then the university's powerful athletic director, the Union's officers granted Michigamua the right, at its own expense, to decorate its room for its exclusive use.

In 1933, the renovated space was dedicated; it was known as the wigwam. Decorations included curved birchbark coverings on the walls to simulate the interior shape and textures of a stereotypical wigwam as well as "relics and tokens of the race of redskins from whom the founders of Michigan's Tribe took their inspiration," according to the student newspaper, along with animal pelts and plaques inscribed with names of past members. From 1933 on, the tribe paid no rent for the space.

For members, the wigwam enhanced a sense of inclusion in a rarified order. It was the end point of the ritual of Rope Day, with initiates required to "duck-walk" across the campus and up the seven-story tower to the "wigwam". (This ritual was photographed for a Life magazine feature on Rope Day in 1954.) Later, the room fueled contention, since the tribe enjoyed exclusive, rent-free access and because it housed Native American artifacts.

== Activities ==
Apart from Rope Day, Michigamua's activities consisted of weekly meetings to discuss campus affairs; outings and parties with dates; and reunions with alumni members, called "Old Braves." By informal understanding, the group refrained from any effort, as a body, to exert influence on student politics or university policies, though members often claimed to advance worthy aims as individuals working behind the scenes. The main exception to that reluctance to act as a group occurred in 1903-04 when Michigamua supported plans for a unifying social club for all Michigan men — students, faculty, and alumni alike — partly in response to tensions between undergraduate fraternity members and "independents". Led by the Michigamua member Edward F. Parker, the campaign established the Michigan Union, one of the earliest such organizations in the U.S., with Parker as its first president. Efforts followed to construct a building to house the organization. Completed in 1919, the Michigan Union building, a campus landmark, housed the Union's own offices and those of many other student organizations, including Michigamua, as well as facilities for dining, recreation, social events, and meetings.

== Membership ==
Michigamua's first cadres chose their successors chiefly based on popularity and "a reputation for originality and class 'deviltry,'" all to promote "good class fellowship". But leadership soon emerged as the key criterion. By 1908, an observer reported the group "aims to draw its members, quite in the manner of the Yale senior societies, from the leaders in all prominent undergraduate activities, studious, social and athletic." Members made efforts to spread invitations roughly equally among fraternity members and "independents".

To make up each new cadre, graduating seniors every spring would choose ten successors from the junior class. The following fall, those ten would choose more members (from 10 to as many as 25) to make up the full "tribe" for that year. Later, all new members would be chosen in the spring of their junior year to make up the following year's membership, with the total limited to 25.

== Notable members ==
(Most of the administrators and coaches who were members were honorary "sachems".

=== Political figures ===
- Gerald Ford, U.S. president
- Frank Murphy, U.S. Supreme Court justice and U.S. attorney general
- Mike Bishop, Michigan Senate majority leader and member of the United States House of Representatives
- Clifford Taylor, Michigan Supreme Court chief justice
- Roger Wilkins, civil rights leader and Washington Post editorialist

=== Athletics ===
- Bo Schembechler, football coach
- Jim Harbaugh, football player and coach
- Fritz Crisler, football coach
- Lloyd Carr, football coach
- Fielding H. Yost, football coach
- Red Berenson (1962), hockey coach
- Don Canham, athletic director
- Jim Abbott, baseball pitcher
- Brian Griese, football player and NFL quarterback
- Tom Harmon, football player and Heisman Trophy winner
- Mike Hart, football player
- Jake Long, football player; the #1 overall pick in the 2008 NFL draft
- Denard Robinson, football player; NFL running back
- Taylor Lewan, football player; NFL offensive tackle
- Steve Strinko, football player; founder of FAN, Inc.
- Marty Turco, hockey goalkeeper
- Peter Vanderkaay, swimmer; Olympic gold medalist
- Connor Jaeger, swimmer; Olympic silver medalist
- Karan Higdon, football player
- Brendan O'Reilly, Irish athlete; Olympic high-jumper

=== University of Michigan administrators ===
- Harry Burns Hutchins, president
- Alexander Grant Ruthven, president
- Harlan Hatcher, president
- Robben Fleming, president

== See also ==
- Collegiate secret societies in North America
- Honor society
