= Henry Simmons Frieze =

American academic administrator

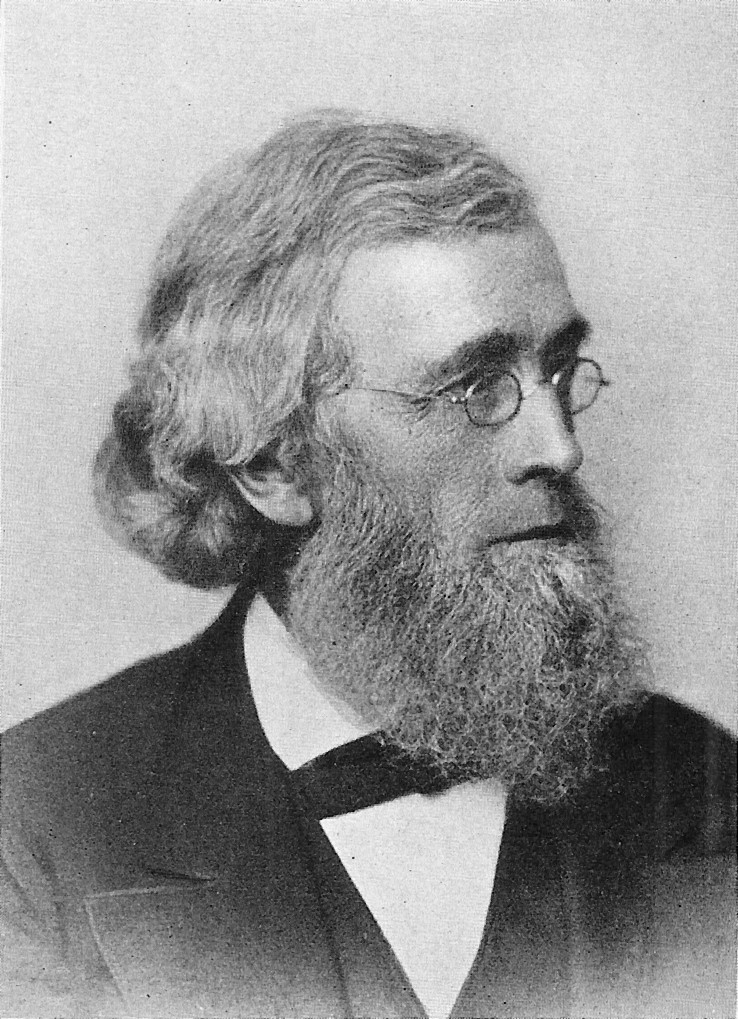

Acting President of the University of Michigan (3 times)
- In office 1869–1871
- Preceded by: Erastus Otis Haven
- Succeeded by: James Burrill Angell
- In office 1880–1882 Serving with James Burrill Angell
- In office 1887–1888 Serving with James Burrill Angell

Personal details
- Born: September 15, 1817 Boston, Massachusetts, US
- Died: December 7, 1889 (aged 72) Ann Arbor, Michigan, US
- Spouse: Anna Roffee
- Parent(s): Jacob Frieze, Betsy (Slade) Frieze
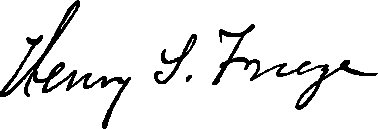
- Signature

Henry Simmons Frieze (September 15, 1817, in Boston – December 7, 1889) was an American educator and academic administrator. He was an instructor at Brown University and its University Grammar School, a professor at the University of Michigan, and served three separate times as acting president of the University of Michigan.

== Early life and Brown University ==
Frieze was born in Boston on September 15, 1817, the child of Jacob and Betsy Slade Frieze. His father was a Universalist pastor, journalist, and noted pamphleteer. He attended Brown University, playing the organ to support himself. After graduating Brown in 1841, he found work as an instructor in Latin at the university and its associated grammar school, where he worked until 1854. One of his students at the grammar school was James Burrill Angell, whose career would later become closely associated with Frieze's at the University of Michigan. He married Anna Roffee in 1847.

== University of Michigan ==
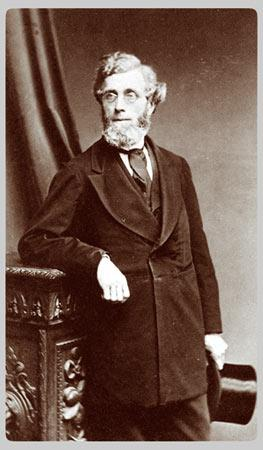
Henry Simmons Frieze

In 1854, Frieze moved to Ann Arbor, Michigan, after being appointed chair of Latin at the University of Michigan. Between 1859 and 1862, the Friezes built a large house at 1547 Washtenaw Avenue in Ann Arbor and lived in it until 1870; known as the Henry S. Frieze House, the home is listed in the National Register of Historic Places.

When Erastus Otis Haven resigned as president of the University of Michigan in 1869, the Board of Regents asked Frieze's former pupil James B. Angell, then serving as President of the University of Vermont, to assume the office. He declined, feeling he had work remaining to be done in Vermont. On August 19, 1869, Frieze was appointed to serve as acting president. While in office, he oversaw two major changes at the university. His predecessor, President Haven, had opposed the admission of women to the university, and an attempt by the Board of Regents to allow their admission had failed in 1869. The resolution passed when it was reintroduced in 1870, and the first woman enrolled that same year, though, at least in the opinion of James Angell, Frieze was not so much a champion of the policy change as he was acquiescent to the wishes of the regents where his predecessor had been vocally opposed. He also introduced the "diploma system," whereby students who graduated from college preparatory programs at Michigan high schools that had been accredited by the Board of Regents could enroll at the university without examination.

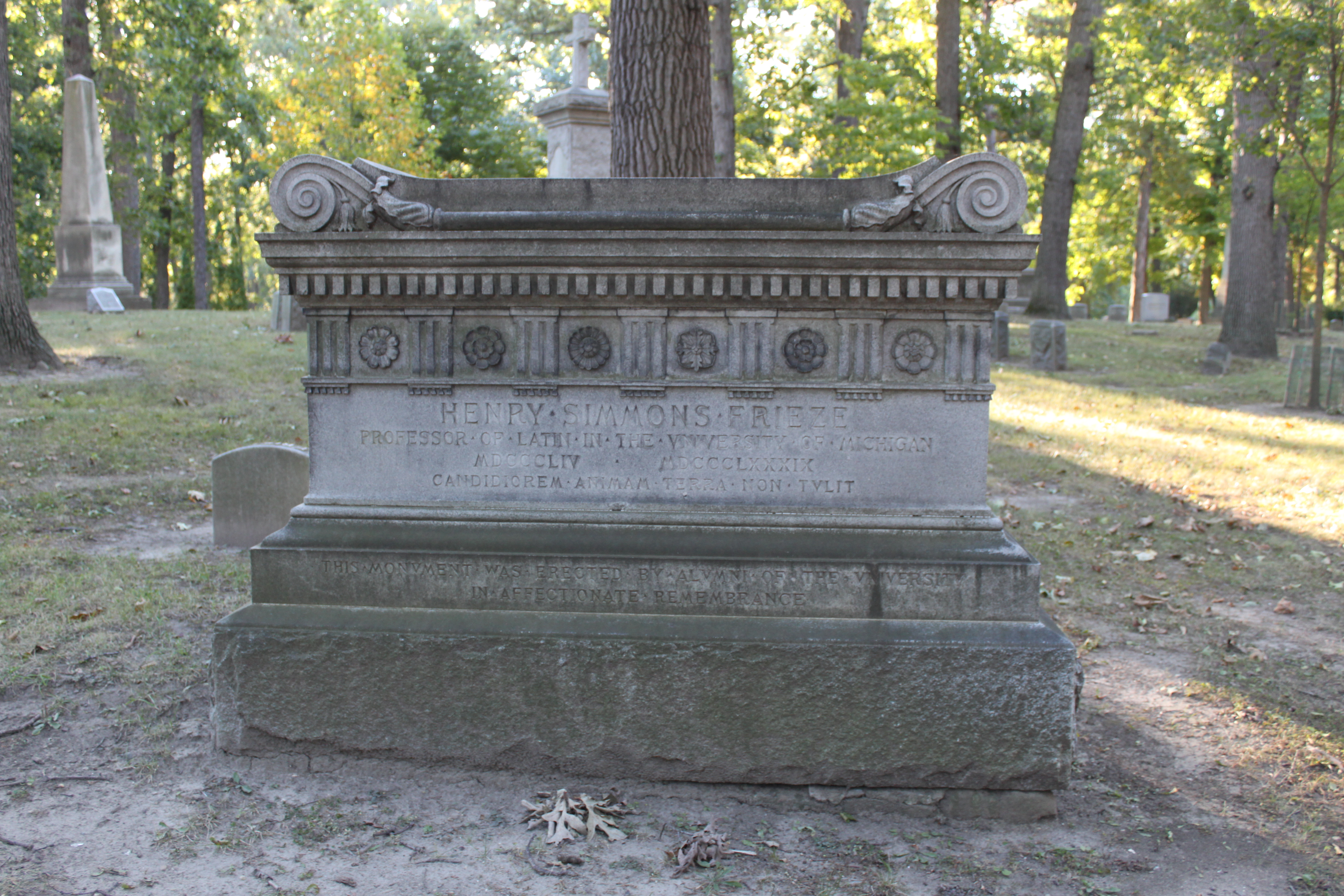
Frieze grave

Frieze served as acting president until 1871, when the offer was repeated to Angell, who this time accepted. He served as acting president twice more, once from June 1880 until February 1882 while Angell was serving as the U.S. Minister to China and again from October 1887 until February 1888 while Angell was serving on the International Commission of Canadian Fisheries alongside George Shorey. He was elected as a member to the American Philosophical Society in 1884.

Henry Frieze died on December 7, 1889, in Ann Arbor and is buried at Forest Hill Cemetery.

== Commemoration ==
- The Frieze Building, formerly Ann Arbor High School, was purchased by the University of Michigan in 1956. It was demolished in early 2007 to make room for the North Quadrangle Residential and Academic Complex. The new building integrates the facade of the Frieze Building and uses various other pieces of architecture in the service of integrating old and new.
- The Frieze Memorial Organ is a 124-rank pipe organ housed at the University of Michigan's historic Hill Auditorium. It was purchased by the University and moved to Ann Arbor in 1894 after it was exhibited at the 1893 Columbian Exposition in Chicago.

== Notes ==
Academic offices
Preceded by Erastus Otis Haven	Acting President of the University of Michigan; 1869–1871	Succeeded by James Burrill Angell
Preceded by James Burrill Angell	Acting President of the University of Michigan; 1880–1882	Succeeded by James Burrill Angell
Preceded by James Burrill Angell	Acting President of the University of Michigan; 1887–1888	Succeeded by James Burrill Angell
