= Henry Moore Bates =

American lawyer

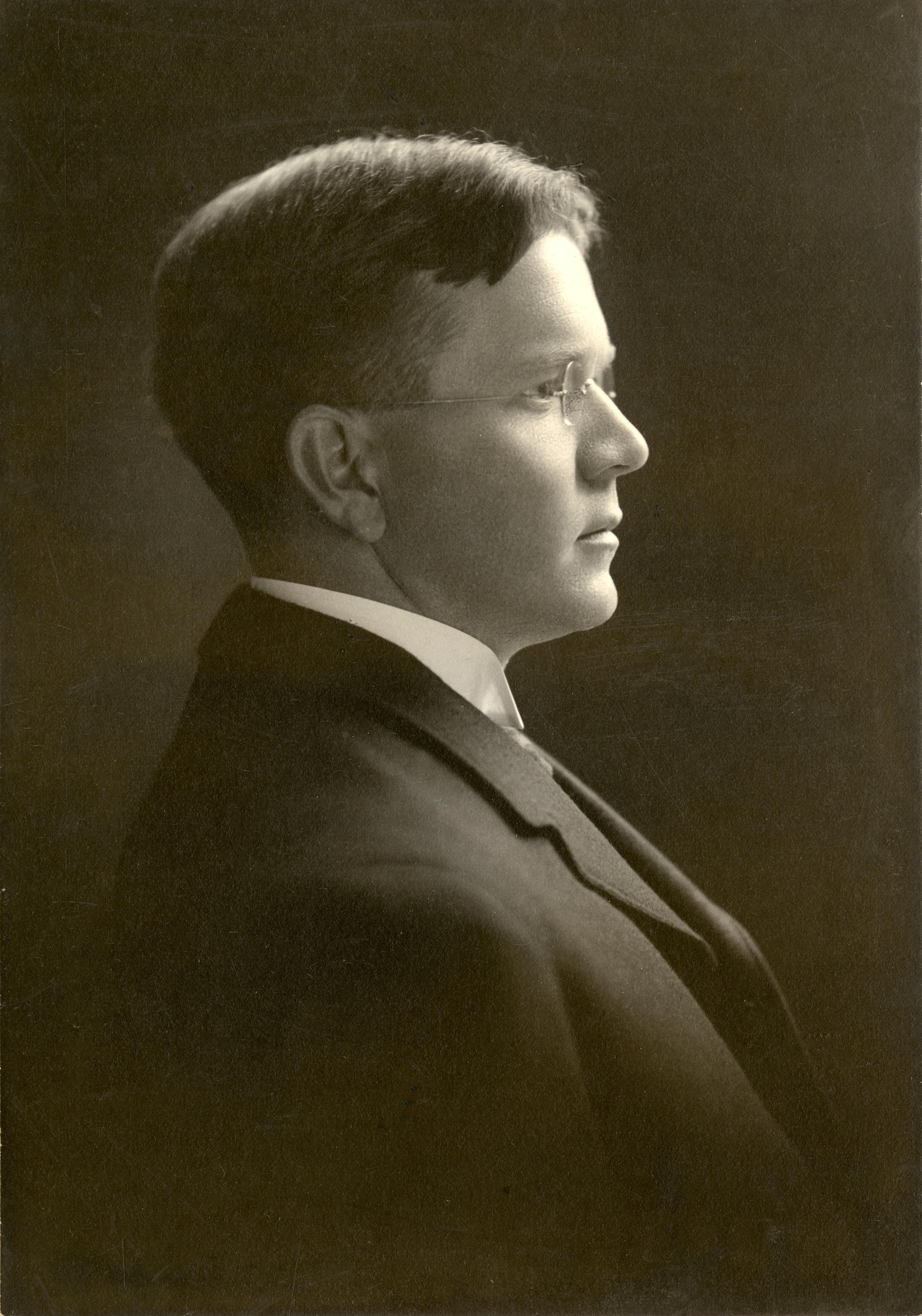
- Henry Moore Bates, ca. 1910

7th Dean of University of Michigan Law School
- In office 1910–1939
- Preceded by: Harry Burns Hutchins
- Succeeded by: E. Blythe Stason

President of the Association of American Law Schools
- In office 1912–1913

Personal details
- Born: March 30, 1869 Chicago, Illinois
- Died: April 15, 1949 (aged 80)
- Education: University of Michigan (Ph.B.); Northwestern University (LL.B.)

Henry Moore Bates (March 30, 1869 – April 15, 1949) was an American lawyer and the dean of the University of Michigan Law School for 29 years.

Born in Chicago, Bates received a Ph.B. from the University of Michigan in 1890 and a LL.B. from Northwestern University in 1892. After practicing law at Chicago, 1892–1903, he became Tappan Professor of Law at the University of Michigan and was made dean of the Law School there in 1910. In 1917–18 he was professor of law at the Harvard Law School and in 1921 he was appointed Commissioner of Uniform State Laws. He was president of the Association of American Law Schools (1912–13), a member of the Executive Committee of the American Institute of Criminal Law (1911–14), and president of the Order of the Coif (1913–16). He was elected a Fellow of the American Academy of Arts and Sciences in 1938. Bates retired as dean in 1939.
