= Henry S. Frieze House =

- U.S. National Register of Historic Places
- Michigan State Historic Site
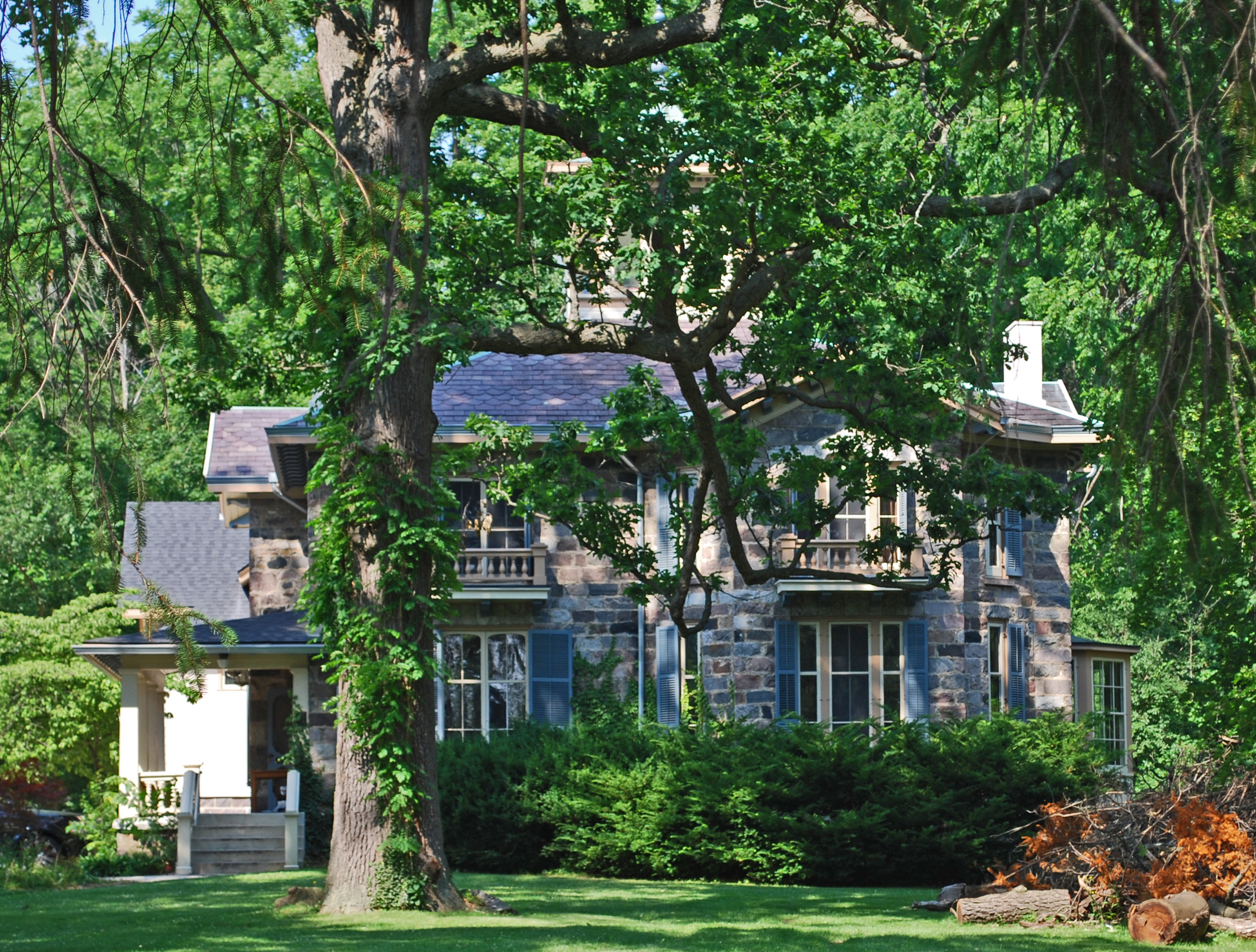

- Location within Michigan Location within the United States
- Interactive map showing Frieze House
- Location: 1547 Washtenaw Ave., Ann Arbor, Michigan
- Coordinates: 42°16′22″N 83°43′41″W
- Area: 2 acres (0.81 ha)
- Built: 1860
- Architectural style: Italianate
- NRHP reference No.: 72000659
- Added to NRHP: November 15, 1972

The Henry S. Frieze House is a single family house located at 1547 Washtenaw Avenue in Ann Arbor, Michigan, United States. It was listed on the National Register of Historic Places in 1972.

== History ==
Henry S. Frieze was born in Boston in 1817, graduated from Brown University in 1841, and in 1854 moved to Ann Arbor to become the Professor of Latin at the University of Michigan. In 1859, Frieze purchased this property, then located outside of town. He had this house constructed by stone masons from Guelph, Ontario during the period 1860-62. In 1868 Frieze sold the house to retired Toledo, Ohio businessman "Deacon" Augustus Scott. In 1898 the house was purchased by Horace W. Wilgus, a professor of law at the university. The Wilgus family lived there until the 1960s.

== Description ==
The Frieze House is a two-story Italianate structure, constructed of dressed fieldstone, with a hipped and gabled slate roof. The roof is topped with a hip roof cupola and weathervane. The fieldstone walls are two feet thick, and range in color from black to light gray, with red and orange shades. The house has massive brick chimneys.

On the interior, the rooms are large, with high ceilings. The first floor has eleven foot ceilings, while those on the second floor are nine feet. The woodwork is walnut and butternut with an oil finish.
