= James Burrill Angell =

American educator and diplomat (1829–1916)

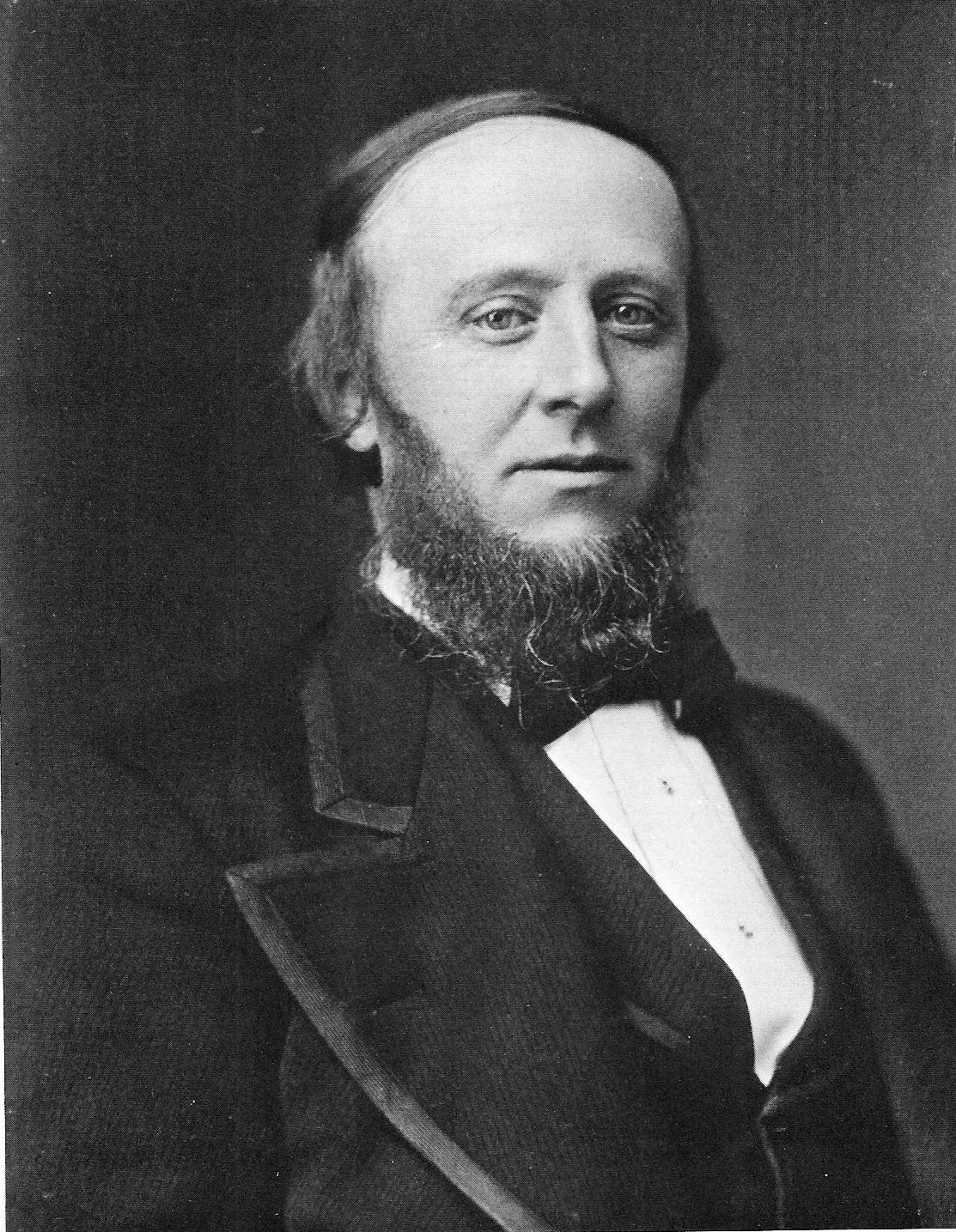
- Angell in 1875

3rd President of the University of Michigan
- In office 1871–1909 Serving with acting presidents: Henry S. Frieze (1880–1882, 1887–1888); Harry Burns Hutchins (1897–1898)
- Preceded by: Erastus Otis Haven
- Succeeded by: Harry Burns Hutchins

United States Minister to China
- In office August 16, 1880 – October 4, 1881
- President: Rutherford B. Hayes
- Preceded by: George Seward
- Succeeded by: John Russell Young

United States Minister to Turkey
- In office September 3, 1897 – August 13, 1898
- President: William McKinley
- Preceded by: Alexander W. Terrell
- Succeeded by: Oscar S. Straus

Personal details
- Born: January 7, 1829 Scituate, Rhode Island, U.S.
- Died: April 1, 1916 (aged 87) Ann Arbor, Michigan, U.S.
- Resting place: Forest Hill Cemetery; 42.278226°N 83.728147°W
- Spouse: Sarah Swoope Caswell
- Children: James Rowland Angell, Alexis C. Angell, Lois Thompson Angell
- Education: Brown University (AB)
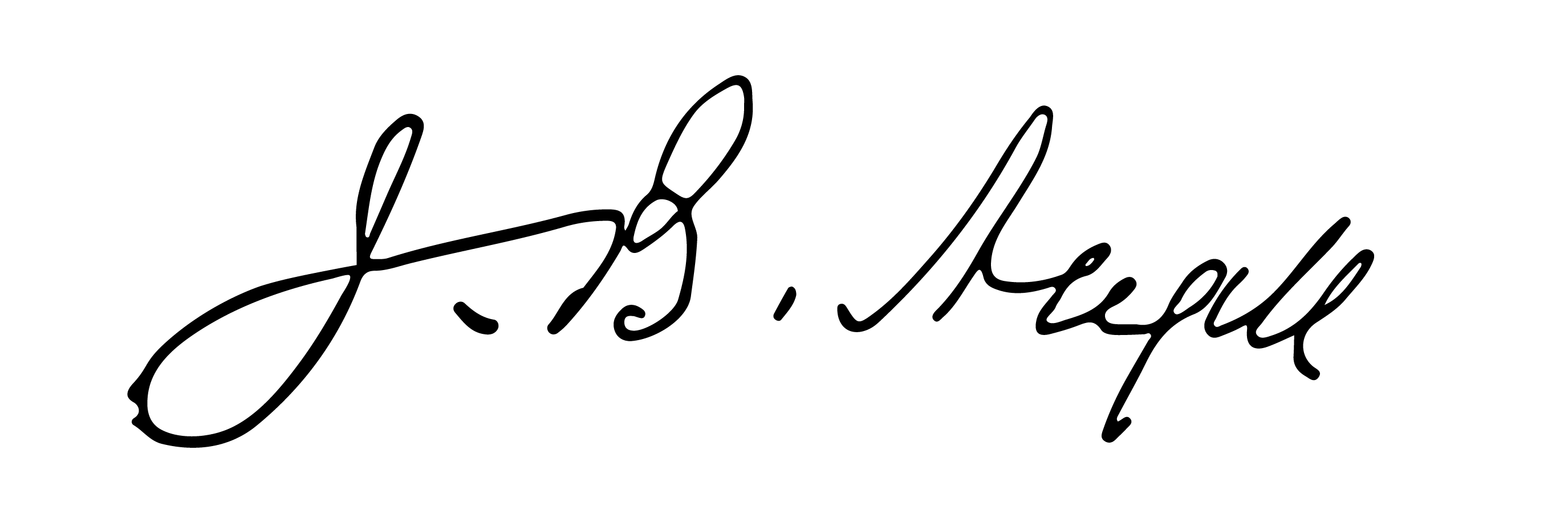
- Signature

James Burrill Angell (January 7, 1829 – April 1, 1916) was an American educator and diplomat. He is best known for being the longest-serving president of the University of Michigan, from 1871 to 1909. He represented the transition from small college life to nationally oriented universities. Under his energetic leadership, Michigan gained prominence as an elite public university. Angell is often cited by school administrators for providing the vision that the university should provide "an uncommon education for the common man." Angell was also president of the University of Vermont from 1866 to 1871 and helped that small school recover from its financial difficulties brought on by the Civil War. Throughout the war, he was the editor of The Providence Journal and was a consistent vocal supporter of Abraham Lincoln.

Angell served in diplomatic posts as America's minister to China from 1880 to 1881 and then to the Ottoman Empire from 1897 to 1898. On his mission to China, he was the primary American negotiator of the Angell Treaty of 1880 that curtailed the emigration of laborers to the United States, as well as a second treaty restricting the trade in opium. In the Ottoman Empire, he was responsible for the protection of American missionaries during the unrest following the massacre of Armenians. Angell was a member of a prominent Yankee family in Rhode Island, and many of his descendants became senior academics.

== Early life ==
James Burrill Angell was born January 7, 1829, in Scituate, Rhode Island, the eldest of eight children of Andrew Aldrich Angell and Amy Aldrich, who themselves were distantly related; he was named after a former senator, James Burrill. The Angells had been a prominent family in and around Providence, Rhode Island, since its founding in 1636 by Roger Williams and his companion Thomas Angell. Though scant, there is evidence suggesting Thomas Angell's ancestors were relations of Henry I of England.

Thomas Angell's grandson had settled the farm where James was born in 1710, the same year he founded the Angell Tavern, where Scituate's leaders held town meetings after its incorporation in 1730, and where men such as George Washington, Benjamin Franklin, and the Marquis de Lafayette stayed during the Revolutionary War. Angell's grandfather built an inn on the site in 1810, and Angell credited his boyhood interaction with the travelers who passed through for some of his later success, saying, "... the knowledge of men I gained by the observations and experiences of my boyhood in the country tavern has been of the greatest service. ... The eminent political speakers were always entertained at our table, and some of them were very helpful friends in my later life." The building burned down in 1862, and the land was later submerged during the creation of the Scituate Reservoir.

=== Education ===
Angell attended the local school until the age of eight, when his parents placed him with a Quaker tutor who taught him arithmetic and surveying. At twelve, he left home to attend a seminary in Seekonk, Massachusetts, in order to study Latin, but after one term went to study at the Smithville Seminary, where he stayed until the age of fourteen. Unsure what career path to take, he had worked on the family farm for two summers, and also unsuccessfully attempted to find clerk jobs with Providence businesses. When his father informed him that he had the financial means to pay for college, Angell decided to attend Brown University. A year too young to enroll, he went first to University Grammar School in Providence, where one of his instructors was Henry S. Frieze, who would later serve as acting president of the University of Michigan while Angell was abroad on diplomatic assignments.

In 1845, Angell began studying at Brown, which had a total of seven instructors on the faculty at the time. He graduated in 1849 and obtained part-time jobs working as an assistant librarian at the university and tutoring a boy whose eyesight prevented him from reading. In 1850, Angell came down with a cold and sore throat, but he refused to give his throat any rest from the daily exertion of reading aloud to his pupil. The resultant damage to his throat made extended speaking difficult for the rest of his life.

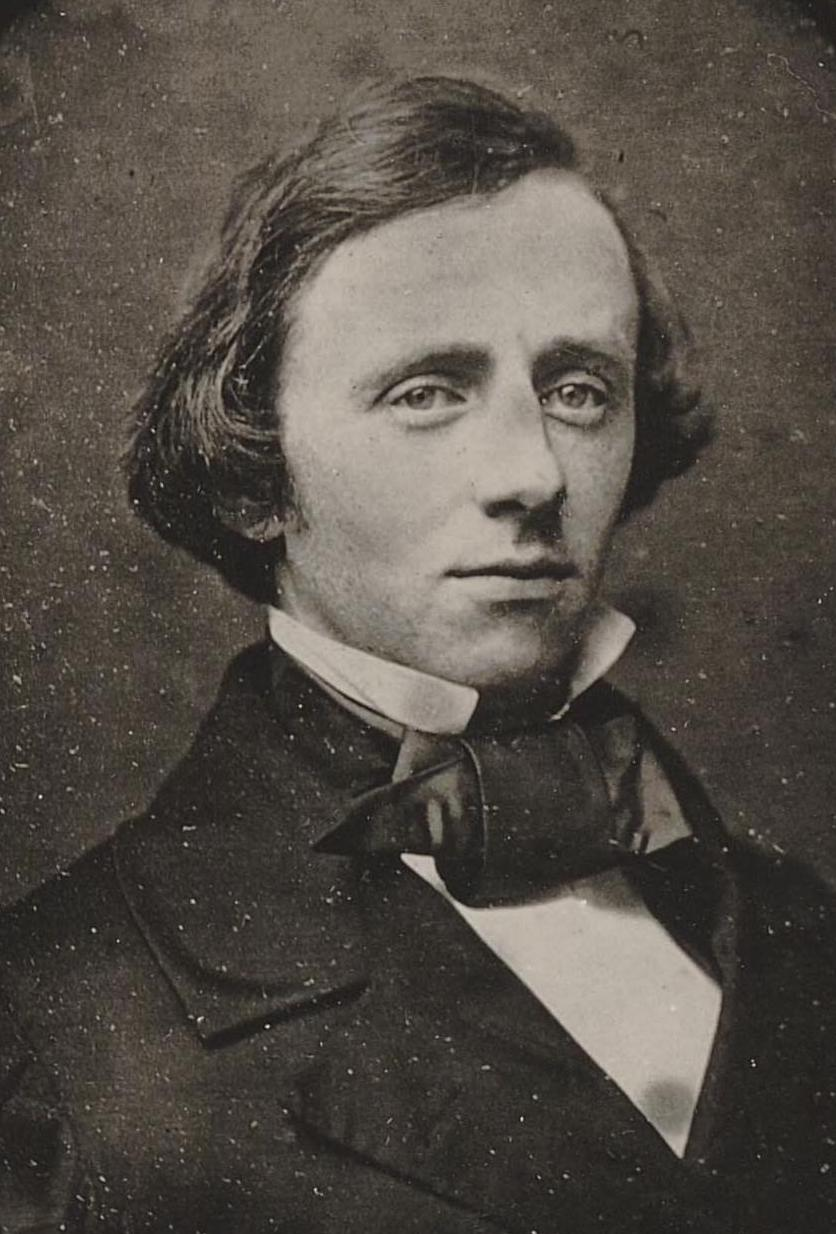
Portrait of James Burrill Angell as a young man

=== Travels ===
While Angell was recuperating, the father of his friend Rowland Hazard II, whose own grandson Rowland Hazard III would later be instrumental in the formation of Alcoholics Anonymous, suggested that Angell accompany Hazard on an upcoming winter tour of the South he was undertaking to help alleviate a lung ailment. The trip, which began on October 5, 1850, lasted seven and a half months and took Angell and Hazard throughout much of the South. The young men were introduced to the realities of slavery, including a whipping and a slave auction that Angell called "the most repulsive and disgusting spectacle we had ever seen".

Upon his return, Angell had planned to attend Andover Theological Seminary and take up a career as a minister. A throat specialist, however, advised him to avoid any work that would require extended public speaking, and he instead found work in the office of Ellis S. Chesbrough, the city engineer of Boston. His brief tenure there ended when his friend Rowland Hazard, still suffering from lung ailments, invited him on another trip, this time to Europe. The pair traveled first to France, arriving just three weeks after Louis-Napoléon Bonaparte had staged a coup d'état, then later to Italy and Austria. While in Vienna, he received a letter from Francis Wayland, the president of Brown University, offering him a choice of jobs as chairman of either the Civil Engineering or Modern Language Department, with a year and a half of continued study in Europe. He chose the latter, and went to Paris for several months to study French, then to Braunschweig, Germany to study German, finally returning home in the summer of 1853.

== Professor and editor ==
When Angell began his tenure as chair of the modern languages department at Brown University, President Wayland was in the midst of reorganizing the university away from its traditional roots. Additional study was offered in areas such as modern languages and engineering, Angell's own areas of interest, and students were given greater freedom to choose elective courses. Extension classes were initiated to bring instruction to the wider community, and Angell gave lectures on his experiences in Europe and on the topic of education. Among his own students, Angell singled out as especially memorable two future U.S. Secretaries of State, Richard Olney and John Hay.

On November 26, 1855, Angell married Sarah Swoope Caswell, the daughter of Alexis Caswell, who was then a professor at Brown and became its president in 1868. Sarah's family was also long-established in New England, and she was a direct descendant of Peregrine White, the first baby born in Plymouth Colony. The couple had a son, Alexis C. Angell, on April 26, 1857.

Wayland grew frustrated with a lack of funding for his reforms and resigned as president in 1855, and his successor, Barnas Sears, reversed many of the reforms. The study of modern languages was de-emphasized, leaving Angell unsatisfied with teaching duties that were now limited to only one-year courses. He began writing articles for The Providence Journal starting in 1854 and took over full responsibility for the editorial pages in 1859. After the editor and part-owner, Henry B. Anthony, was elected to the United States Senate in 1858, he proposed that Angell replace him as editor. Angell resigned his professorship in 1860 to become the full-time editor of the paper.

Angell allied himself with the radical wing of the new Republican Party, and lent the paper's backing to the 1860 gubernatorial candidacy of abolitionist Republican nominee Seth Padelford, which failed when a coalition concerned about the economic effects of angering the South instead led to the election of fellow Republican William Sprague. In the presidential contest, Angell felt that Rhode Island's interests would be best served by the nomination of staunch abolitionist William H. Seward as the Republican candidate. But when the somewhat more moderate Abraham Lincoln was nominated, he put the power of the Journal behind Lincoln's candidacy, publishing favorable letters from his former pupil John Hay, who was by then working in Lincoln's law offices. In the end, Lincoln carried Rhode Island, 61.4% to 38.6%.

Angell ran the Journal for the entire Civil War, and briefly considered buying it to run as a non-partisan newspaper (an idea which Senator Anthony rejected), but the workload took its toll on his health. In August 1866, when the University of Vermont requested that he come serve as its new president, he accepted the offer and moved to Burlington.

== University of Vermont ==
The Civil War had depleted the University of Vermont of students and the funds that came with them. When he assumed the presidency in 1866, Angell's primary responsibility was to improve both the size of the student body and the university's finances. He oversaw the integration of a state agricultural college formed following passage of the Morrill Act in 1862, which had introduced land-grant colleges in the United States. This effort faced resistance both from classicists worried about the influence of the new college on the quality of education and from farmers who doubted the university curriculum had much to offer them, but Angell was able to build enough trust between the groups that the integration went forward, and both the finances and enrollment began to recover; the latter grew from 31 in 1866 to 67 in 1870.

Angell traveled to state and county fairs around Vermont to attract publicity for the university and his fundraising efforts, and also secured donations from prominent alumni such as Henry J. Raymond, founder of The New York Times, and Congressman Thaddeus Stevens. Due to a lack of funds to hire professors, he personally taught the university's courses in history, rhetoric, German, and international law.

On May 8, 1869, the Angells had another son, James Rowland Angell, who later served as president of Yale University. On September 3 of that year, the University of Michigan offered Angell its presidency, following the resignation of Erastus Haven that June. He visited Ann Arbor with his wife, but he felt that he had a duty to complete his work at the University of Vermont and declined the offer. Michigan repeated the offer in 1871, his former teacher Henry S. Frieze having served as acting president while the regents searched for a permanent president. This time, Angell felt that the University of Vermont had made enough progress that he could leave it in good conscience, and he accepted the offer. He made a trip to Ann Arbor to deliver his inaugural address at Commencement on June 28, 1871, then returned to Vermont to complete the academic term before moving his family to Ann Arbor in September of that year.

== University of Michigan ==
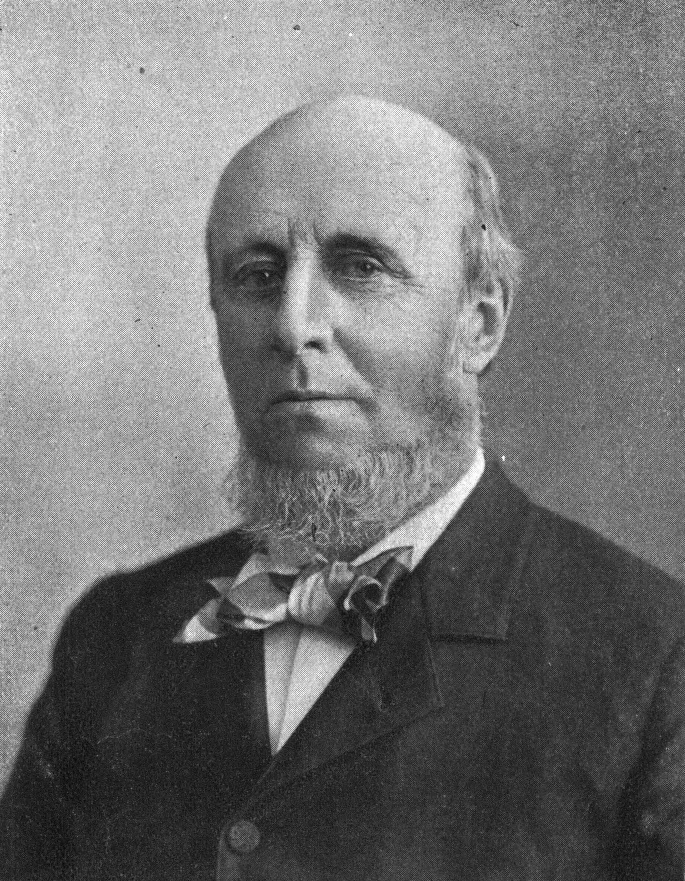
James B. Angell in 1897

When Angell took over as the third president of the University of Michigan in 1871, it was the largest university in the country, with 1,207 students, 35 faculty members, and an annual budget of $104,000. But it was still more a collection of colleges than an expression of the "German model" of university that had been envisioned by its first two presidents, Henry Philip Tappan and the recently departed Haven. Over the next 38 years, Angell oversaw growth and innovation that led to him being called "the chief architect of the modern state university".

Unlike Tappan, Angell did not have an overriding vision of the future of education, but he introduced several changes early in his tenure, establishing a scientific course that no longer required Greek, dropping classics from the English course, and greatly expanding the number of elective courses. Michigan had begun admitting women the year before Angell arrived, one of the first large schools to do so, and Angell pushed for its continuation and became known as an advocate for coeducation for the rest of his career. Angell felt it was important for a president to teach courses, and he taught international law during his entire term.

=== Controversies ===
Angell's first decade in Ann Arbor was marked by several controversies. One involved his expressions of Christian piety in the course of official business, which drew criticism as aligning the state-funded university too closely with his personal faith. (Note: During his inaugural speech, he stated that "the Christian spirit, which pervades the law, the customs, and the life of the State shall shape and color the life of the University, that a lofty, earnest, but catholic and unsectarian Christian tone shall characterize the culture which is here imparted", and had also stated an express desire to hire faculty who would prepare students for "their work in promoting our Christian civilization".) Detroit resident Stephen B. McCracken lodged a complaint in 1873 that said such Christian—and specifically Protestant—favoritism violated the state constitution, to the detriment of Catholics, Jews, spiritualists, and free thinkers. A state senate committee investigated and ultimately cleared Angell and the university, concluding that "the teachings of the university are those of a liberal and enlightened Christianity, in the general, highest and best use of the term." Angell recognized the need to make the Christian spirit he wished to cultivate more voluntary and less explicitly Protestant, first by dropping compulsory chapel attendance, then by hiring the university's first Roman Catholic faculty member, Eugene W. Hilgard.

The question of whether homeopathic medicine should be taught at the university had been debated for decades before Angell's arrival, and in 1873 the legislature passed a law appointing two professors of homeopathy in the medical school, despite the testimony of Angell and others that doing so would be a great mistake that might ultimately kill the entire department due to the hostility of the medical faculty towards homeopathy. The regents refused to appoint the professors, (Note: The question of whether the state legislature had the power to dictate to the regents regarding university affairs was not settled until 1895, when a Michigan Supreme Court decision in favor of the regents held that final authority over the university was vested in them by the state constitution.) saying it was impossible to teach both types of medicine in a single department but they would establish a separate school to teach homeopathy if the legislature funded it. Funding for a separate school was provided in 1875, and the School of Homeopathy was created. In spite of his earlier opposition, Angell worked to find qualified professors and to ensure the school provided the best possible instruction, and it coexisted with the medical school until it was closed in 1922.

In October 1875, an audit of student laboratory fees in the chemistry department found a shortfall of $831.10, attributable to one of two professors, Silas H. Douglas or Preston B. Rose. Rose at first mortgaged his house to make up the difference, but later Douglas was also found to be responsible. Charges and countercharges were made among the two men, various regents, and President Angell. Douglas was Episcopalian and Rose was Methodist, and their fellow churchmen joined in a bitter public debate over who was to blame. A two-month investigation by the state legislature produced a 740-page report, and the case ultimately went to the Michigan Supreme Court, where Douglas won a judgment against the university in 1881. One historian wrote that "no one who examines the voluminous records of the struggle ... can doubt that the University would have been a far stronger institution ... had there been no Douglas-Rose controversy". The six-year fight affected Angell as well, with one professor saying he "was never quite the same" afterwards.

=== Growth of the university ===
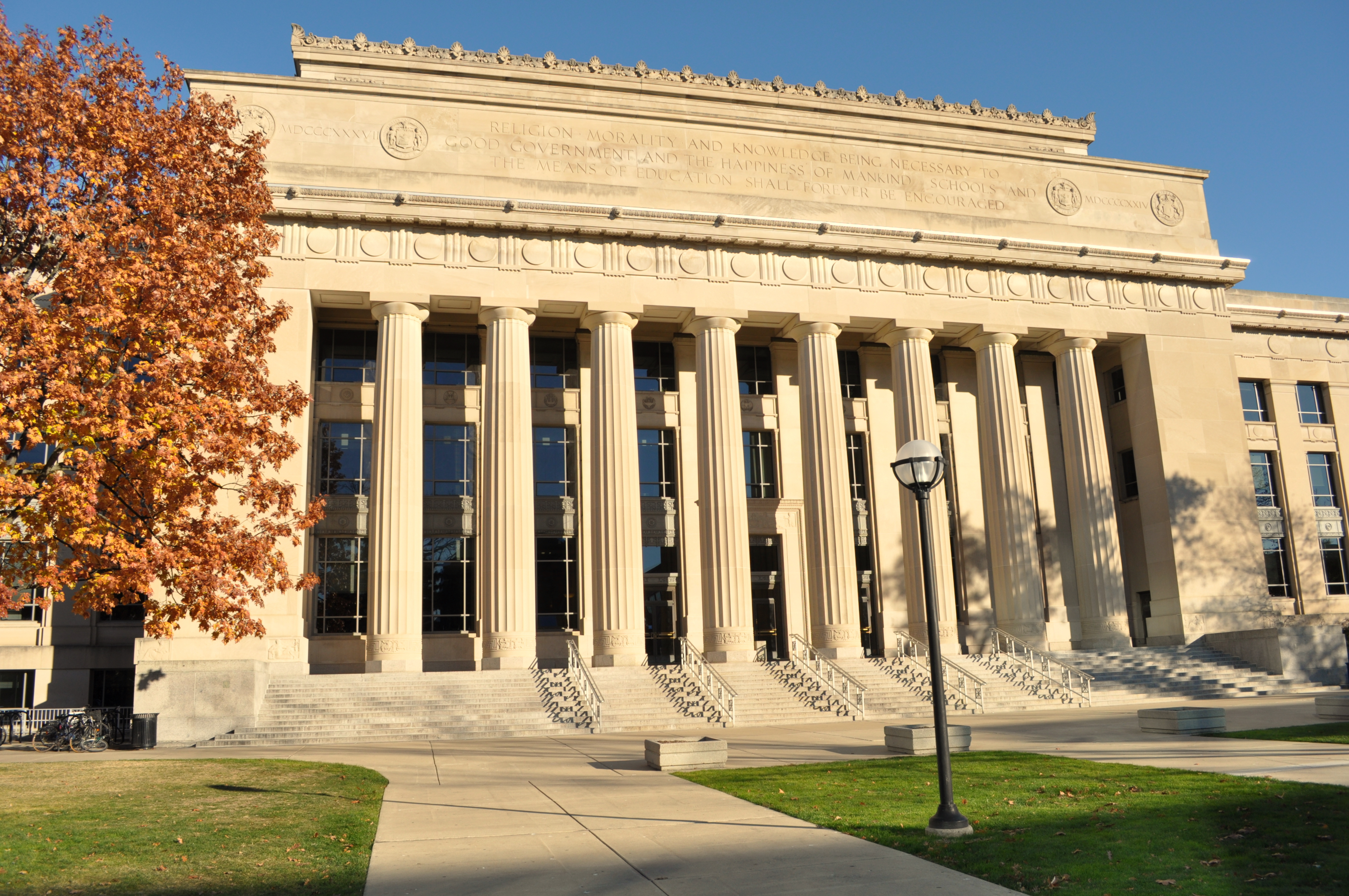
Angell Hall, dedicated in 1924, on the University of Michigan campus

During his tenure at Michigan, the faculty size grew from 35 to about 400; the student body from 1,100 to over 5,000; the annual budget from $104,000 to over $1,000,000. The following schools or colleges were founded during his tenure: Dentistry, Pharmacy, Music, Nursing, and Architecture & Urban Planning.

Concerned about the growing role of professionalism in collegiate sports and a loss of control by faculties over athletics on campus, Angell called for a meeting in 1906 of the presidents of the members of the Western Conference (now the Big Ten). At the Angell Conference, the presidents agreed to restrictions on the number of games, years of student eligibility, and ticket prices. An additional rule targeted Michigan football coach Fielding H. Yost's considerable outside income by requiring coaches be full-time employees of the university. In spite of Angell's efforts to institute more control, Yost convinced a majority of the regents to support him, and Michigan left the athletic conference for nearly a decade rather than abide by the new rules.

== Diplomatic posts ==
Angell put his academic career on hold at several points in order to carry out a variety of diplomatic assignments, including serving as minister to the Qing Dynasty in China and the Ottoman Empire as well as negotiating maritime treaties with Britain and Canada. He remained president of the University of Michigan throughout, but took leaves of absence with acting presidents managing in his place.

=== Minister to China ===
In February 1880, Secretary of State William M. Evarts asked Angell to go to China to negotiate changes to the Burlingame Treaty that would reduce the flow of Chinese immigrants into the Pacific United States. Angell was nominated by President Hayes, confirmed by the Senate as minister to China and chairman of the treaty commission on April 9, 1880. Angell left for Peking that June with fellow commissioners John F. Swift and William Henry Trescot, and presented his credentials on August 16, succeeding George Seward. Henry S. Frieze was appointed acting president of the University of Michigan in his absence.

The commission negotiated two treaties. The first, formally called the Treaty Regulating Immigration from China and dubbed by historians as the Angell Treaty of 1880, allowed the U.S. to regulate and limit the immigration of Chinese laborers, but not to prohibit it outright. The second was a trade treaty that outlawed the trade of opium and set tonnage dues and tariffs to be the same for both nations. The treaties, collectively, were signed on November 17, 1880, and the other commissioners returned home, leaving Angell in China to fulfill his duties as minister. After a year, he decided to return to academia and left China on October 4, 1881, taking a trip through Europe and returning to Ann Arbor on February 24, 1882. Angell was succeeded in his post by John Russell Young. Most of the provisions that the Angell Treaty had secured were negated by the Chinese Exclusion Act of 1882 and the Scott Act of 1888, which placed much stricter bans on Chinese immigration.

=== Maritime commissions ===
In the fall of 1887, President Cleveland appointed Angell to a three-man commission, along with William L. Putnam and Secretary of State Thomas F. Bayard, to negotiate with the British government regarding fishing rights off the coast of Canada, which had been a source of misunderstanding between Canada and the U.S. since they were first agreed to in the Treaty of 1818. The results of these negotiations, the Bayard-Chamberlain Treaty, was signed on February 15, 1888, but subsequently failed ratification in the U.S. Senate, whose Republican majority had objected to the formation of the commission in the first place.

On November 4, 1895, President Cleveland appointed Angell to the Deep Waterways Commission, along with John E. Russell and Lyman E. Cooley. The commission, created by Congress, was to negotiate an agreement between the U.S. and Canada regarding the creation of a waterway to allow ocean-going traffic between the Great Lakes and the Atlantic Ocean. They undertook a feasibility study and forwarded proposals for further appropriations to Congress, but little was done, and it was not until 1959 that the St. Lawrence Seaway finally opened.

=== Minister to the Ottoman Empire ===
President McKinley asked Angell to serve as Envoy Extraordinary and Minister Plenipotentiary to the Ottoman Empire in April 1897, and he agreed on the condition he could return home after a year if he wished. Angell's nomination encountered brief opposition from Constantinople, first because of reports that he had accused Russia of fomenting unrest in the region, and then because Sultan Abdul Hamid II had confused Angell's Congregationalist faith with the Congregation of Jesuits, of whom he had a poor opinion. These objections were resolved by Angell's denial of the former report and clarification to the Sultan on the latter misunderstanding; the Senate confirmed him and he sailed to Europe on the SS Normandie in July, then on to Constantinople, where he presented his credentials to the Sultan on September 3, succeeding Alexander W. Terrell. The University of Michigan regents appointed Harry Burns Hutchins acting president in his absence, through October 1898.

The pressing issue facing Angell in the Ottoman Empire was the protection of American missionaries during the unrest following the massacre of Armenians that had been carried out over the previous two years, as well as compensation for damage to their properties they claimed were caused by both the deliberate actions and the inaction of Turkish forces. He was mostly unsuccessful on this front, except for negotiating a $50,000 surcharge on a warship the Ottoman Empire was purchasing from an American firm, with the understanding that this would be used to resolve the claims of damages (and which was eventually paid in 1901). Angell blamed this failure in part on the outbreak of the Spanish–American War causing American naval ships to leave the area and remove pressure on the Sultan.

Angell and his wife toured the Middle East from January to March 1898, visiting Cairo, Jerusalem, Damascus, Beirut, and Ephesus. President McKinley was disturbed by a request from Angell to send American warships to "rattle the Sultan's windows"; he feared it would lead to an event like the sinking of the Maine, and approached Oscar S. Straus about taking over the post. Angell himself was becoming discouraged by his inability to win concessions from the Turkish government and submitted his resignation in May. He had his final audience with the Sultan on August 5 and left his post on August 13, traveling home by way of Greece, Italy, Switzerland, and France.

== Later years ==
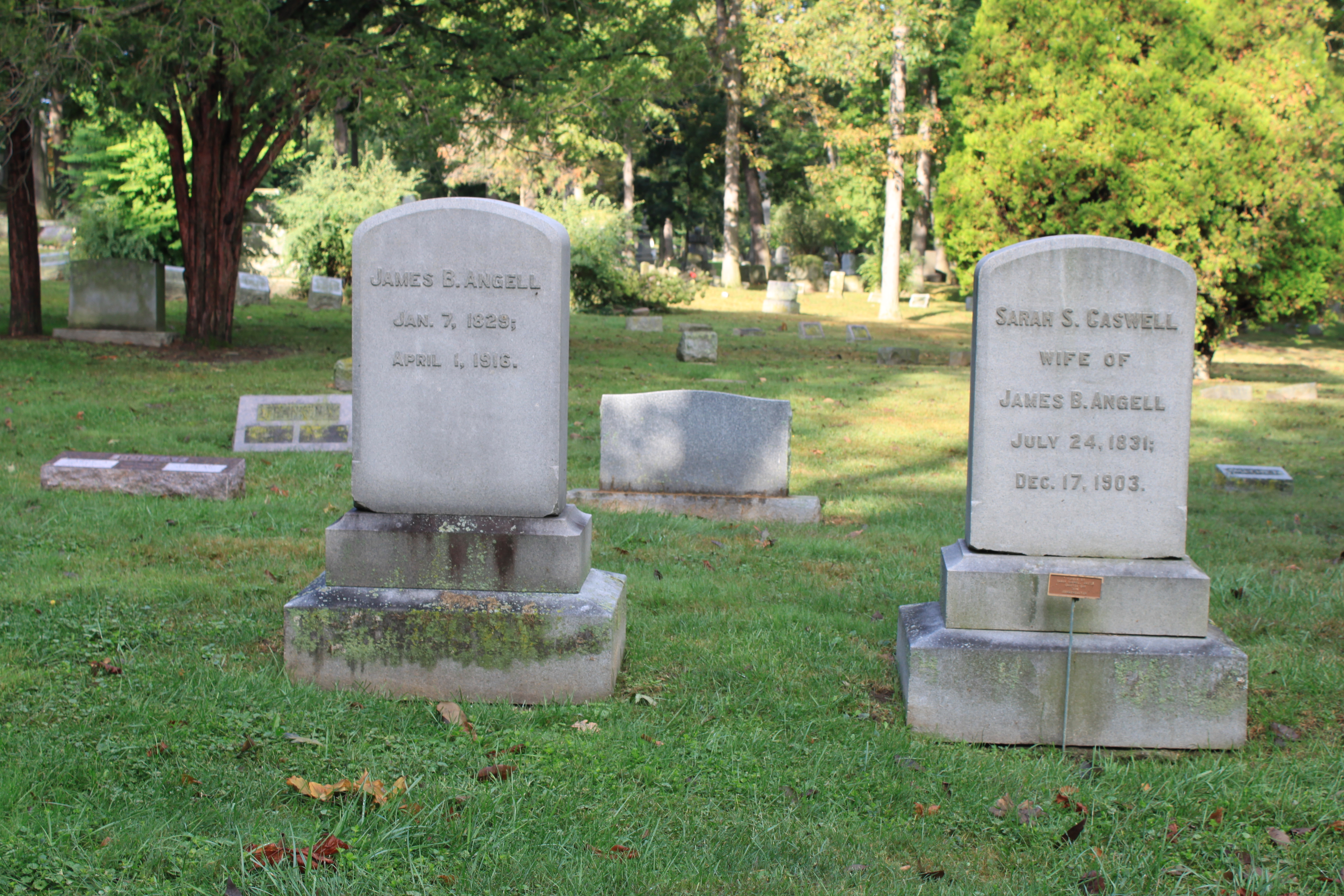
Graves of James and Sarah Angell

Angell's wife, Sarah Caswell Angell, died on December 17, 1903. In 1905, Angell submitted his resignation to the Board of Regents, feeling that at his age, he may be losing the qualifications for his position, but the board refused to accept it. By 1909, he had been in office for 38 years and this time the Regents accepted his resignation. .

Angell's health began to decline while on a tour of Europe in the summer of 1911, when he suffered a stroke of paralysis in Germany following an exhausting excursion to Russia. He recovered sufficiently to return to Ann Arbor within a month, but his lingering weakness was blamed for a bout of pneumonia in September 1913. On January 24, 1916, he had a stroke that affected his eyesight, leaving him unable to read, and he grew weaker until he contracted pneumonia again. He died a few days later, April 1, 1916, and was buried in Forest Hill Cemetery on April 3, with a line of university students formed on each side of the streets as his funeral cortege traveled through Ann Arbor.

== Legacy ==
Angell's historic legacy is based on the transition of Michigan from a small local state college to a major national University featuring state-of-the-art research. He was a transitional figure, maintaining the small-college paternalistic interest in the welfare of individual students, and endorsing the traditional small-college mission to promote civility and character building. He introduced a broader mission including admission by merit; coeducation; teaching large classes by lecture; and an increasing emphasis on graduate studies. He introduced a broad curriculum ranging from the humanities to the social sciences, sciences and engineering, as well as traditional and modern professional fields. He appealed to the Michigan public for financial support, and provided a model that was followed by other ambitious university presidents. His moderation, natural tact, and political astuteness strengthened his leadership role, and his diverse background in foreign languages, literature, civil engineering, and newspaper work facilitated his approaches to every major interest group in the state. However, Angell was not as dynamic or innovative as the younger generation such as Charles W. Eliot, Daniel Coit Gilman, and William Rainey Harper. By 1909 he was obsolete in terms of the state-of-the-art in world-class universities, and was even accused of provincialism, inbreeding, and complacency.

=== Notable descendants and relatives ===
A number of James Angell's descendants and near relatives rose to prominence in their respective fields, largely also in academia:

- Son James Rowland Angell was president of Yale University.
- Son Alexis C. Angell was a Michigan Law School professor and U.S. District Judge.
  - Grandson Robert Cooley Angell was chair of the sociology department at the University of Michigan and president of the American Sociological Association.
- Nephew Frank Angell was a psychologist at Cornell and Stanford universities.
- Son-in-law Andrew McLaughlin, married to Angell's daughter Lois (b. 1863), was a Pulitzer Prize-winning historian.
  - Granddaughter Constance Green was also a Pulitzer Prize-winning historian.

=== Honors and appointments ===
- Elected an associate fellow of the American Academy of Arts and Sciences in 1868.
- Elected a member of the American Philosophical Society in 1889.
- Elected a member of the American Antiquarian Society in 1890.
- Served as president of the American Historical Association from 1892 to 1893.
- Honorary Doctor of Law degrees from Brown University (1868), Columbia University (1887), Rutgers College (1896), Princeton University (1896), Yale University (1901), Johns Hopkins University (1902), University of Wisconsin (1904), University of Vermont (1904), Harvard University (1906), University of Michigan (1908), and Dartmouth College (1909).
- Regent of the Smithsonian Institution from January 19, 1887, to January 15, 1912.
- Awarded the First Class of the Order of the Sacred Treasure by Emperor Meiji in October 1909 for service to Japanese students.
- Inducted into the Rhode Island Heritage Hall of Fame in 2008.

=== Commemoration ===
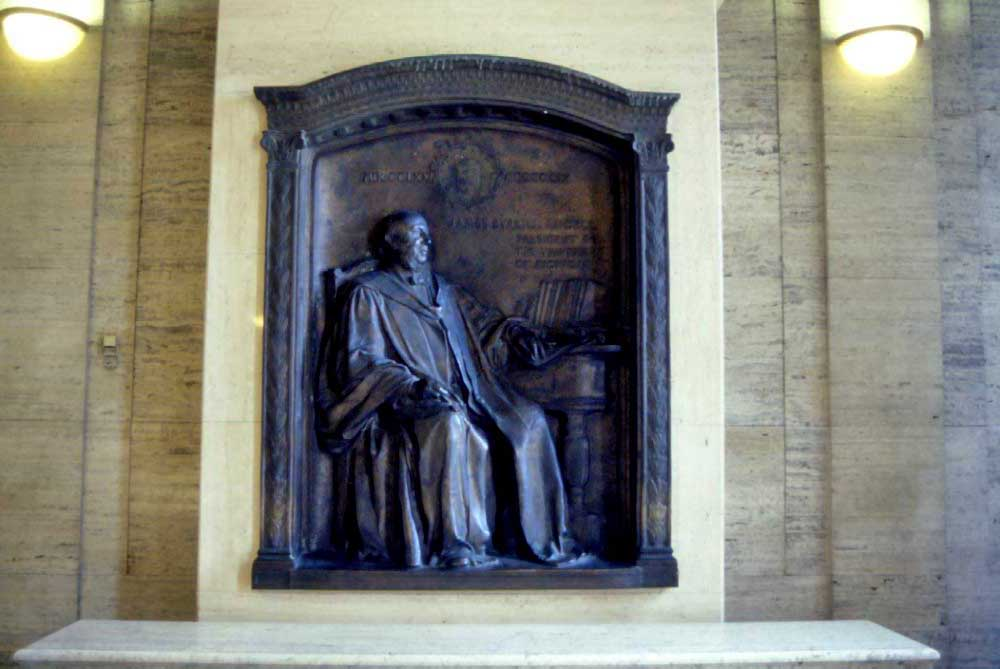
Angell by Bitter

- Angell Hall, one of the most prominent buildings on the University of Michigan campus, is named after him. Designed by Albert Kahn, it was completed in 1924 at a cost of $1 million, providing 152,000 square feet (14,100 m^{2}) of classroom and office space.
- Angell School, a kindergarten through fifth grade elementary school in the Ann Arbor Public Schools, is named after him.
- Angell School, a kindergarten through fifth grade elementary school in the Berkley School District, is named after him.
- In 1910 sculptor Karl Bitter produced a 7-foot-tall (2.1 m) bas relief depicting a seated Angell. It now resides in the lobby of Angell Hall.
- A caricature of Angell by Ulysses Ricci's firm Ricci and Zari can be found carved on a corbel at the University of Michigan's Law Quadrangle.
- The former University of Michigan honor society Michigamua renamed itself the Order of Angell in 2007, over the objections of some of Angell's descendants.
- Sarah Caswell Angell Hall was a theater in Barbour Gymnasium (a women's gymnasium on the Michigan campus), named in honor of Angell's wife in 1905. The gymnasium was torn down in 1946.

== See also ==
- History of Chinese Americans
- History of Rhode Island
- History of the University of Michigan

== Citations ==
Academic offices
| Preceded by Joseph Torrey | President of the University of Vermont; 1866–1871 | Succeeded by Matthew Henry Buckham |
| Preceded by Erastus Otis Haven; Henry S. Frieze (acting) | 3rd President of the University of Michigan; 1871–1909; With: Henry S. Frieze (acting 1880–1882); Henry S. Frieze (acting 1887–1888); Harry Burns Hutchins (acting 1897–1898) | Succeeded by Harry Burns Hutchins |
Diplomatic posts
| Preceded by George Seward | U.S. Minister to China; August 16, 1880 – October 4, 1881 | Succeeded by John Russell Young |
| Preceded by Alexander W. Terrell | U.S. Minister to Turkey; September 3, 1897 – August 13, 1898 | Succeeded by Oscar S. Straus |
