= Harry Burns Hutchins =

American academic (1847-1930)

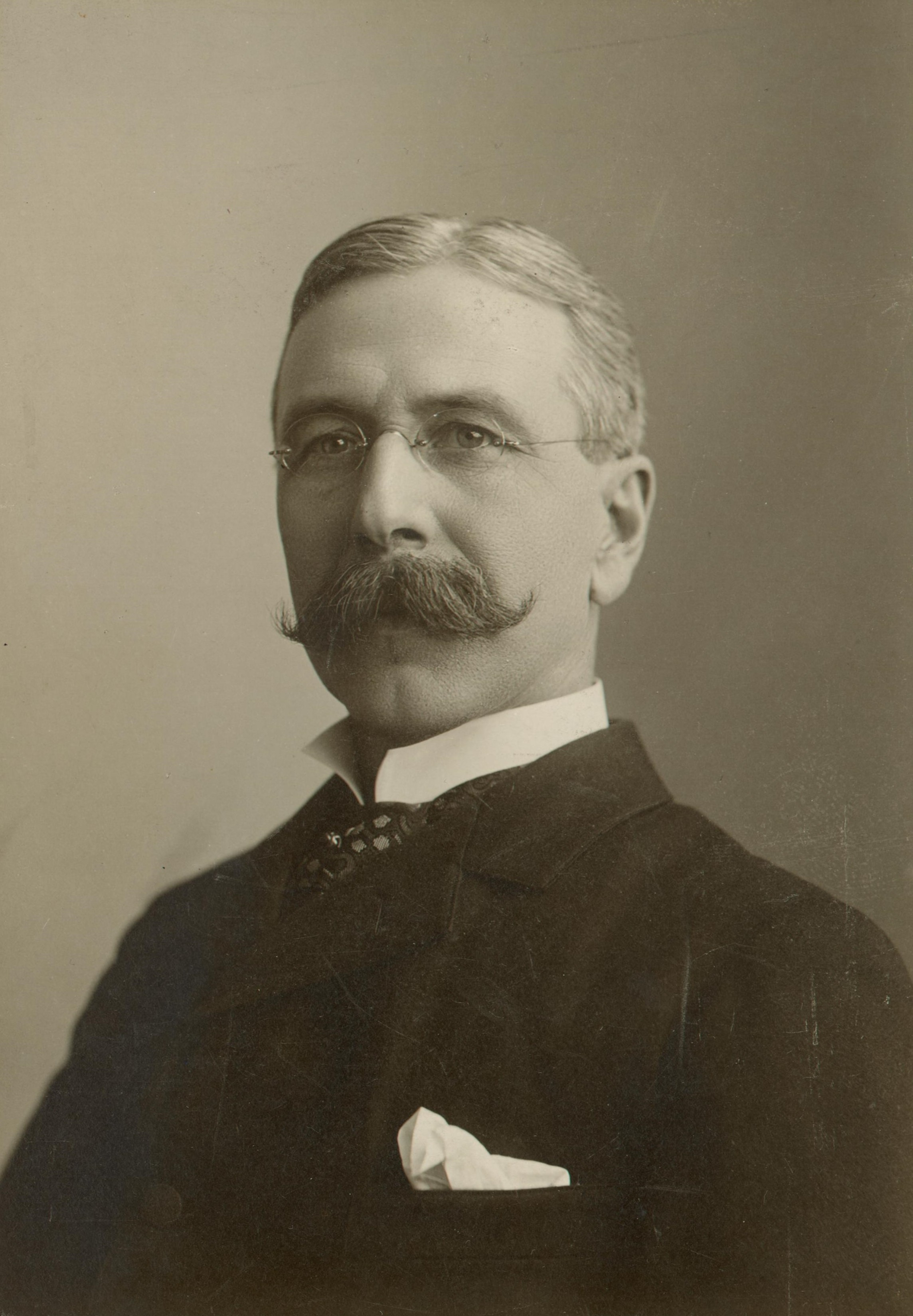
- Hutchins, c. 1890–1900

4th President of the University of Michigan
- In office 1909–1920
- Preceded by: James Burrill Angell
- Succeeded by: Marion LeRoy Burton

6th Dean of University of Michigan Law School
- In office 1895–1910
- Preceded by: Jerome C. Knowlton
- Succeeded by: Henry Moore Bates

Acting President of the University of Michigan
- In office 1897–1898 Serving with James Burrill Angell

Personal details
- Born: April 8, 1847 Lisbon, New Hampshire
- Died: January 25, 1930 (aged 82) Ann Arbor, Michigan
- Spouse: Mary Louise Crocker (m. 1872)
- Children: 1
- Education: Wesleyan University (no degree); University of Michigan (BA)

Harry Burns Hutchins (April 8, 1847 – January 25, 1930) was the fourth president of the University of Michigan (1909–1920).

== Biography ==
On April 8, 1847, Harry B. Hutchins was born in Lisbon, New Hampshire. Hutchins got his education at New Hampshire Conference Seminary, now known as Tilton School, as well as the Vermont Conference Seminary. Hutchins, at the age of nineteen, entered Wesleyan University in Connecticut. Hutchins, unfortunately, was not able to complete his first year however due to falling ill. Subsequently, Hutchins graduated from the University of Michigan in 1871. While at the University of Michigan, he was a member of the Alpha Delta Phi fraternity. After graduation he became the superintendent of schools in Owosso, Michigan and then was appointed instructor in rhetoric and history at Michigan for three years. While teaching, he simultaneously studied law. Though he never received a degree in law he took and passed the law bar and was certified to practice law in 1876. After practicing law in Mt. Clemens, Michigan with his father-in-law for eight years, he returned to Ann Arbor to teach law as the Jay Professor of Law. On December 28, 1872, Hutchins married Mary Louise Crocker. Together, they would adopt one son, Harry C. Hutchins.

=== Death ===
Hutchins suddenly become ill on January 22, 1930, and died three days later at his home in Ann Arbor at the age of 82.

== Dean of Law at University of Michigan ==
Hutchins served as Dean of the University of Michigan Law School from 1895 to 1910. Hutchins Hall, the main classroom and administrative building of the law school, is named after him. During Hutchins time as the Dean, he raised the entrance requirements to the law school, as well the adoption of a complete three-year course in Law. Dean Hutchins believed the standards set by a law school should be rigorous.

== President of the University of Michigan ==
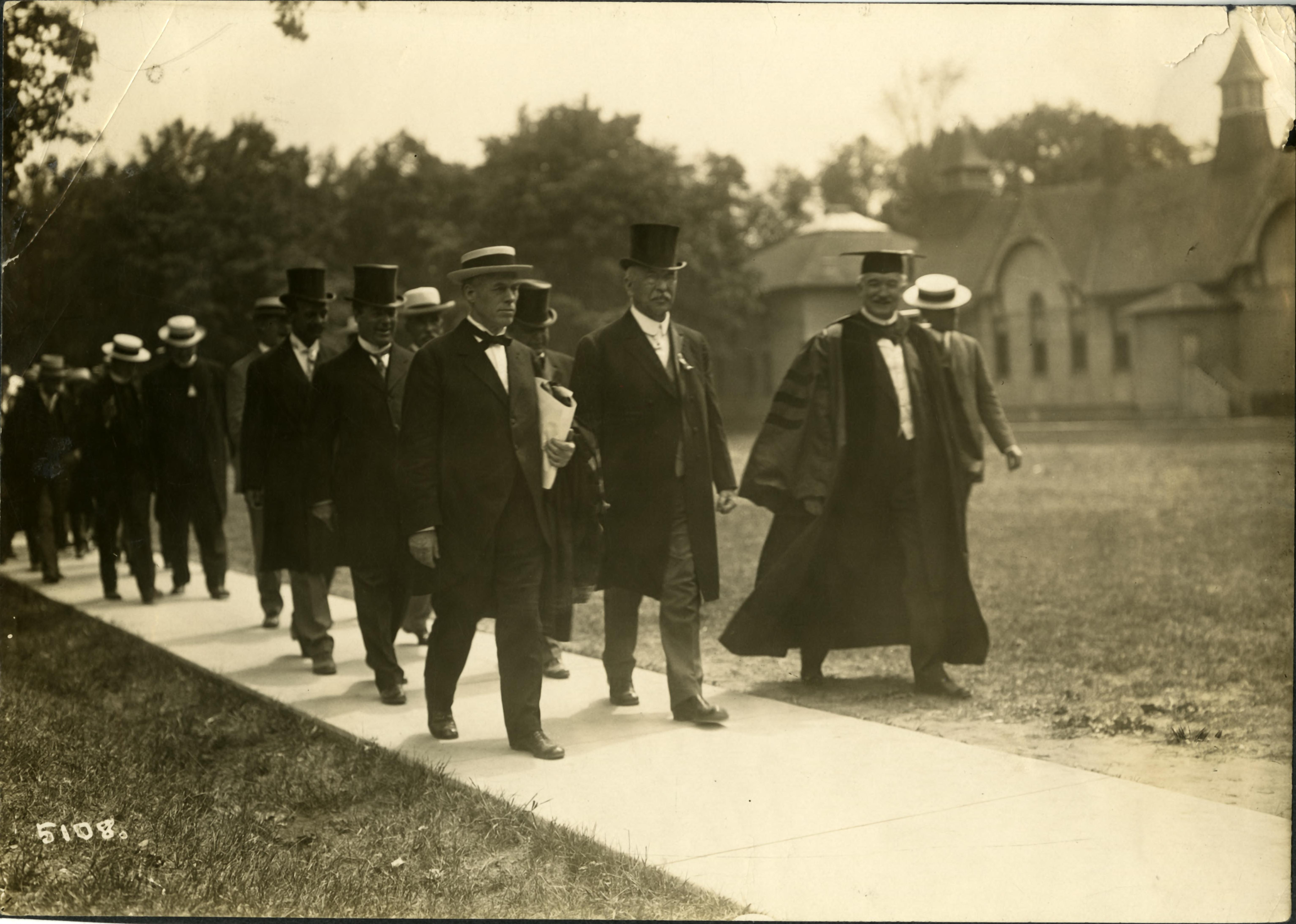
Commencement, 1912: University President H.B. Hutchins and dignitaries walking across The Diag toward the Engineering Arch

=== Acting President ===
Hutchins twice served as acting president of the University of Michigan. His first appointment as acting president came in 1897 when current President Angell left to be Minister of Turkey. The second stint as acting president for Hutchins came in 1909 when President Angell resigned. Hutchins was to serve until a new permanent president was found. After a year long search which included the courtship of Woodrow Wilson, the Regents at the University of Michigan decided to offer Hutchins the full-time appointment of President of the University of Michigan. The regents offered 3 years, but Hutchins wanted a 5-year appointment, so after a stormy meeting they agreed on a five-year appointment. However, after 5 years, Hutchins would stay on another five years bringing his time as president to a full ten years.

=== Alumni Association ===
Hutchins was very instrumental in strengthening the university's alumni association. As the first Michigan alumnus to serve as president of the university, Hutchins "wanted to reclaim them (alumni) by organization, to persuade them to maintain a continuing interest in the welfare of their university, to advertise in their communities so as to attract the best new students, and to contribute financially toward the University development"

=== Campus growth ===
The University saw great growth in his tenure as the student body grew from less than 5,000 to more than 9,000, the Alumni Association grew leaps and bounds, the faculty grew from 427 to 618, the formation of the graduate school, and with the help of the newly organized Alumni Association and their many wealthy donors, there was the addition of many new buildings. The most prized addition in Hutchins' eyes was that of the Michigan Union (1919). The Union was something that he very much pushed for. Many other buildings were erected under Hutchins' watch and many of them are still in use today. That list includes: Hill Auditorium (1913), Martha Cook Building (1915), Helen Newberry Residence (1915), the Natural Science Building (1915), the General Library (1920), and the Betsy Barbour House (1920). Though Hutchins may not have been on the forefront of the development of all the new buildings on campus, the way he was with the union and housing for women, his leadership in establishing an organized alumni organization helped to make much of the new growth possible. During Hutchins' tenure, the University received 130 private gifts, totaling $3,600,000

=== Graduate school ===
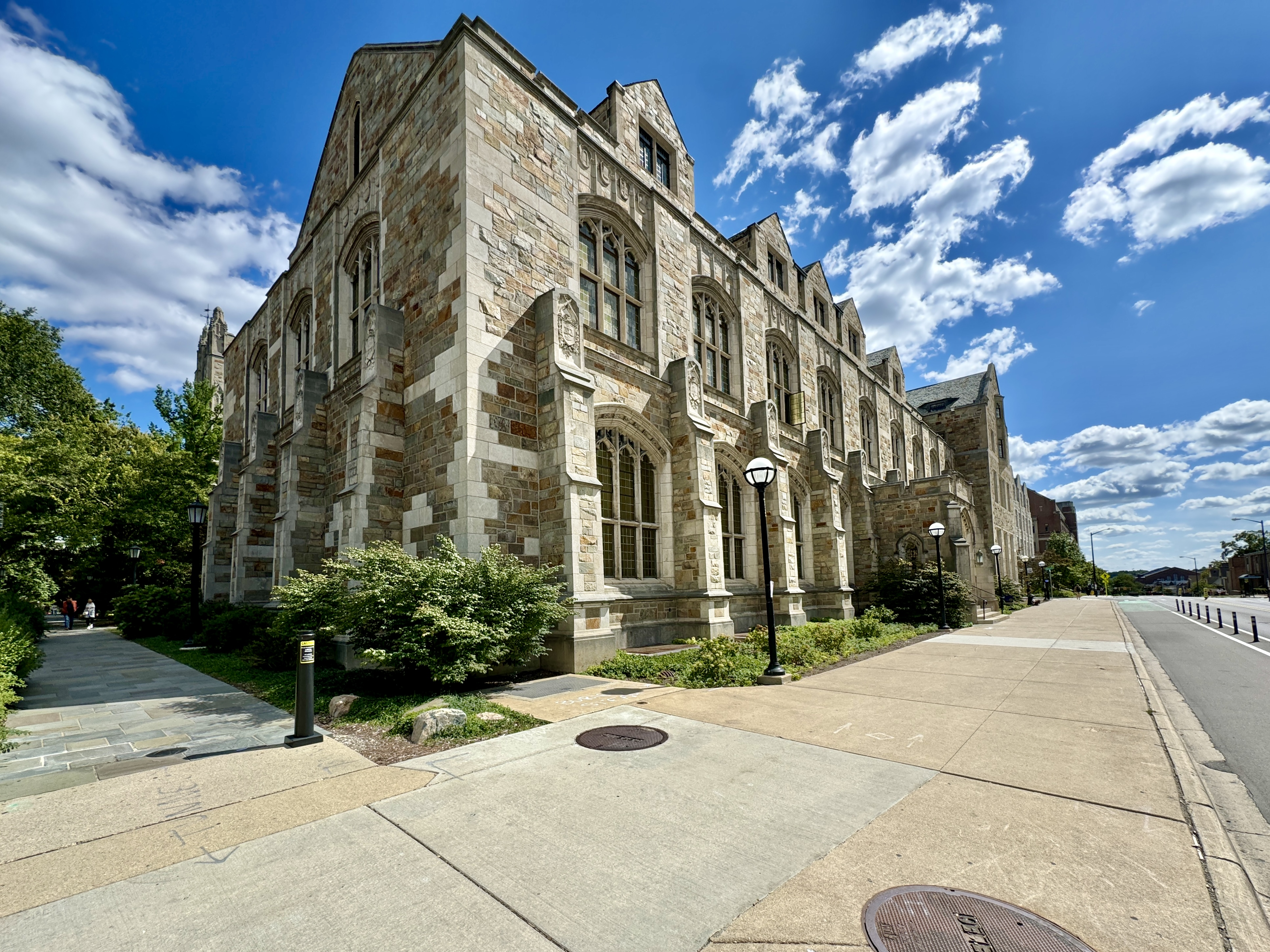
Hutchins Hall, Law Quadrangle

Hutchins was instrumental in the creation of a separate graduate school from the undergraduate school. He wanted it to be "tough" even if only half the students got in. On January 19, 1910, Hutchins made a speech to the New York University of Michigan Club which was published in the New York Times; it read, "many of these graduate schools work too hard to get students and too little for results. Some of them are not a credit to the country, and Michigan is not without fault of her own in this respect, but we are working at Ann Arbor to remedy this condition, and we expect soon to have a graduate school in the true sense of the word. There are men in many of the schools who ought to be pushed out into the world to do a man's work instead of hanging around the universities. A reorganization of the system is needed, and at Michigan we are trying to accomplish a renascence. I do not care if we have only thirty students in the school if we only have one real one."

=== Women on campus ===
The University also saw considerable growth for women on campus during Hutchins' tenure. Ruth Bordin writes in her book Women at Michigan: The Dangerous Experiment, that, "by 1920, in addition to Newberry and Martha Cook, four small dormitories in converted houses had been provided, and the Betsey Barbour dormitory opened that year. About 350 women lived in sororities, but the great majority lived in a league house." Specifically the development of the Martha Cook Building was due in large part to the great relationship Hutchins had with William W. Cook, who provided the financial contribution for this all female housing facility in honor of his mother, Martha.

=== WWI ===
Much of Hutchins' tenure was during WWI. There was much desire from many alumni, faculty, and students to include military drill as part of the class requirements for the male students, as possible preparation if they were called to duty in the war that was happening in Europe. Hutchins felt differently and would not be stampeded into this idea. Hutchins felt at the outset that the University's unique function was to furnish trained leadership for the nation. To make the University simply another military camp for privates was in his view a gross misuse of its potentials, and he resisted it. Hutchins believed with an ever-changing warfare that the students would be better served in engineering to help with the modern war, "whose weapons were applications of physical, chemical, mathematical, and engineering principles."

=== Retirement ===
Hutchins retired in 1920, taking the title of President Emeritus. He would live the next ten years up to his death in 1930 in Ann Arbor.

== Sources ==
Academic offices
Preceded by James Burrill Angell	4th President of the University of Michigan; 1910–1920 (interim 1909-1910)	Succeeded by Marion LeRoy Burton
