= University of Michigan =

Public university in Ann Arbor, Michigan, U.S.

- Former names: Catholepistemiad, or University of Michigania (1817–1821)
- Motto: Latin: Artes, Scientia, Veritas
- Motto in English: "Arts, Knowledge, Truth"
- Type: Public research university
- Established: August 26, 1817; 209 years ago
- Accreditation: HLC
- Academic affiliations: AAU; ORAU; URA; URC; sea-grant; space-grant
- Endowment: US$25.0 billion (2026)
- Budget: $15.6 billion (2026)
- President: Domenico Grasso
- Provost: Laurie McCauley
- Faculty: 8,526 (2025)
- Administrative staff: 24,765 (2025)
- Students: 54,181 (2026)
- Undergraduates: 36,945 (2026)
- Postgraduates: 17,236 (2026)
- Location: Ann Arbor, Michigan, United States; 42°16′37″N 83°44′17″W
- Campus: 3,177 acres (12.86 km^{2}); Midsize city
- Newspapers: The Michigan Daily; The Michigan Review
- Yearbook: Michiganensian
- Colors: Maize and blue
- Nickname: Wolverines
- Sporting affiliations: NCAA Division I FBS – Big Ten; CWPA
- Website: umich.edu

The University of Michigan (UMich, U-M, or Michigan) is a public research university in Ann Arbor, Michigan, United States. It was founded in 1817 and is the oldest institution of higher education in the state. It is one of the earliest American research universities and is a founding member of the Association of American Universities.

The university has the largest student population in Michigan, enrolling more than 54,181 students, including more than 36,945 undergraduates and 17,236 postgraduates. It is classified as an "R1: Doctoral Universities – Very high research activity" by the Carnegie Classification. It consists of 19 schools and colleges, offering more than 280 degree programs. The university is accredited by the Higher Learning Commission. In 2021, it ranked third among American universities in research expenditures according to the National Science Foundation.

The campus spans 3,200 acres (12.95km²) across its five campus areas in Ann Arbor. It encompasses Michigan Stadium, which is the largest stadium in the United States, as well as the Western Hemisphere, and ranks third globally. The University of Michigan's athletic teams, including 13 men's teams and 14 women's teams competing in intercollegiate sports, are collectively known as the Wolverines. They compete in NCAA Division I (FBS) as a member of the Big Ten Conference. Between 1900 and 2022, athletes from the university earned a total of 185 medals at the Olympic Games, including 86 gold.

== History ==
=== Origins ===
The proposal for establishing an institution of higher education in Michigan dates back to 1703, during the colonial period of New France. (Note: The séminaires in the colonies were primarily institutional transplants from France. In terms of their spirit and mission to prepare individuals for the priesthood, these institutions closely resembled their counterparts in France, which were often advanced ecclesiastical establishments. The training involved rigorous academic formation, including the defense of theses. However, the realities of a frontier society meant that they could not simply exist as carbon copies of those in France. In their early years, in an attempt by Jean-Baptiste Colbert, King Louis XIV's minister, to impose the French language and culture on the colonies, the séminaires in New France mainly served as preparatory schools for Indigenous people as well as for children of settlers with studious dispositions and a desire to enter the priesthood. They would only later evolve into true séminaires when circumstances allowed.) Just two years after founding Fort Pontchartrain du Détroit on the strait between Lakes Saint Clair and Erie in 1701, the French explorer and later colonial governor of Louisiana, Antoine de la Mothe Cadillac, wrote to King Louis XIV's minister, Louis Phélypeaux de Pontchartrain, from the settlement under the date of August 31, 1703. He urged the establishment of a seminary in the newly formed parish of Sainte-Anne-de-Détroit for the education of both Indigenous and French children in piety and the French language. It remains uncertain whether a seminary was ever established; the surviving registres make no mention of a seminary being created from the proposal. Jesuit superiors in Quebec probably opposed the idea of creating a seminary in the Pays d'en Haut, due to disputes with Cadillac and fears of rivalry with their own institutions. Parish records from 1755 indicate, nevertheless, that Jean Baptiste Rocoux was "Director of Christian Schools", a title likely influenced by Jean-Baptiste de La Salle. He kept a school either at his residence on St. Jacques Street or in a building under the patronage of Ste. Anne's Church. Mentions are made of a seminary of unknown founding at the fort that trained young men for the ministry, but it was destroyed in the Great Fire of 1805. Additionally, there was a French subscription school that stood near the fort in 1775, and an old account book preserved from 1780 contains tuition charges dated as early as 1760.

The colony was surrendered to the British monarchy in 1762 following the French and Indian War. The local French Canadians maintained the Christian schools, which became bilingual; however, the British, who viewed the colony merely as a trading post, did practically nothing for education, leading to stagnation during their rule from 1763 to 1796.

When the colony came under American control following the enforcement of the 1783 Treaty of Paris in 1796, the territorial judges were supposed to be called in to formally define the rights and legal status of the Christian schools under the new constitution. Thereafter, the interpretation of the American right to education in Michigan, grounded in Section 1, Article XI of the Northwest Ordinance, was laid out. Since 1806, parish-minister Gabriel Richard, who presided over the Christian schools and helped plan a new layout for Detroit after the fire in 1805, petitioned for land to found an "institution for higher learning" on several occasions and suggested that a lottery might be used to support the academies he headed. Subsequently, in 1817, during the postwar period following the War of 1812, the Territorial government, at the instigation of Fr. Richard and Judge Augustus B. Woodward and with the support of U.S. President Thomas Jefferson, passed "an Act to establish the Catholepistemiad, or University of Michigania" within the Territory of Michigan. Enacted on August 26, 1817, the Act effectively consolidated the schools into one institution. Rev. John Monteith, a Presbyterian minister, was named as its first president and Fr. Richard as vice president. Its didactors had authority not only over the university itself but also over education in the territory in general. The legislative act was signed into law by Acting Governor and Secretary William Woodbridge, Chief Judge Augustus B. Woodward, and Judge John Griffin.

=== The Catholepistemiad, 1817–1821 ===
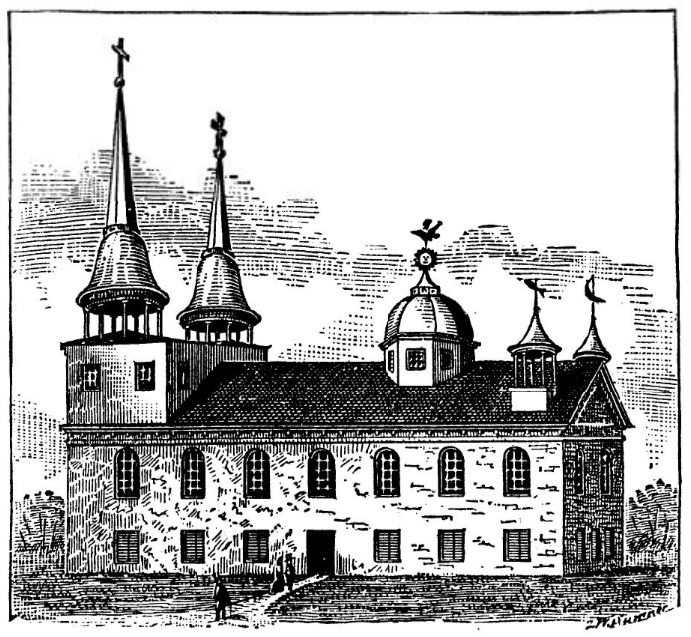

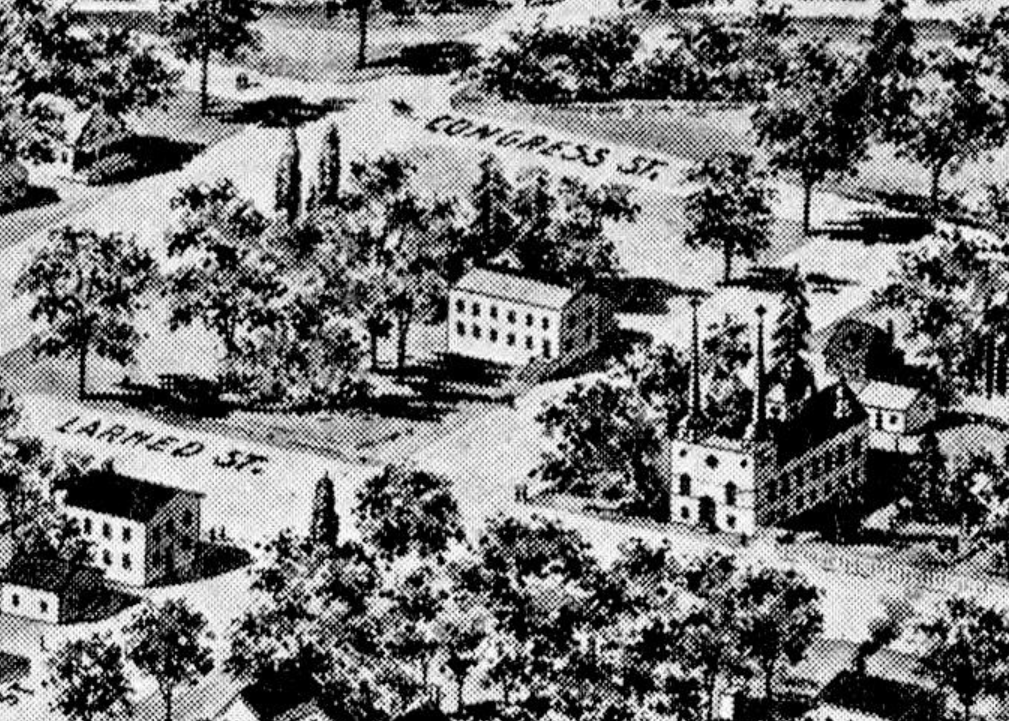
From top to bottom: Ste. Anne's "Stone Church", built in 1818; The Catholepistemiad's schoolhouse (center) on an 1818 map of Detroit. The schoolhouse fronts Bates Street, directly across from Ste. Anne's "Stone Church" (middle of the lower right).

The university was modeled after an institution established in France a decade earlier, known as the Université imperial, under Emperor Napoleon. The term "Catholepistemiad", a neologism derived from a blend of Greek and Latin roots, can be loosely translated as "School of Universal Knowledge". This entity included an array of schools and libraries under a single administration, with the authority to establish additional schools across the territory. It was not until the legislative council passed the territory's first public school law on April 12, 1827, which made basic education a municipal duty, that the corporation focused solely on higher education.

The university may have initially been funded through private donations and federal land grants. Its first endowment may have been a land grant from the U.S. federal government on May 20, 1826, issued under "an Act concerning a seminary of learning in the territory of Michigan" and based on the Treaty at the Foot of the Rapids and the Treaty at Detroit. This grant was issued in accordance with a gift from Catholic members of indigenous tribes to the university's initiator, Gabriel Richard, with half allocated to Ste. Anne Parish and the other half directed toward the creation of the university. Shortly after its founding in 1817, the university received a $250 subscription from the Freemason Zion Lodge of Detroit. Of the total amount subscribed to establish the university, two-thirds came from the Zion Lodge and its members. Early benefactors included Joseph Campau (1769–1863) and his nephew John R. Williams (1782–1854).

The cornerstone of the University Building, located on Bates Street directly across from the 1818 "Stone Church" of Ste. Anne Parish in Detroit, was laid on September 24, 1817. By the following year, a Lancasterian school, taught by Lemuel Shattuck, and a classical academy, taught by Hugh M. Dickey, were in operation. The Detroit city library, incorporated on August 26, 1817, was initially located in the University Building, with university teachers serving as librarians. Over the years, the University Building was occupied by various teachers, including D. B. Crane, who taught Latin and Greek and established a chemistry laboratory in the building. The University Building later served as the Detroit Branch School after the university moved to Ann Arbor.

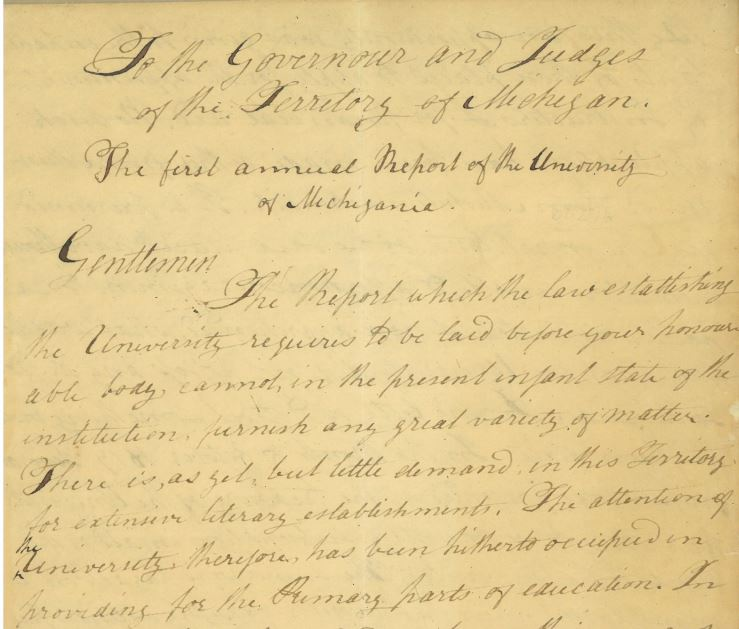
First Annual Report of the University of Michigania, authored on November 16, 1818

In 1821, by a new enactment, the university itself was created as a "body politic and corporate", maintaining its corporate status through various modifications to its charter. The new act placed the corporation under the control of a board of trustees. Rev. Monteith joined the board shortly but left the university for New York a year later, despite being offered the chairmanship. The trustees continued to manage the schools and classical academy, but established no new schools. By 1827, the first public school law mandated that local governments organize their own school districts within each township. Thereafter, the university leased the Detroit schoolhouse to private teachers, and the first school in Detroit under this law opened about the first June by an order of the trustees. However, the school soon closed following the passing of its teacher. The following year, the Bridge School in Raisinville Township was established under local governance.

=== Early years in Ann Arbor, 1837–1851 ===
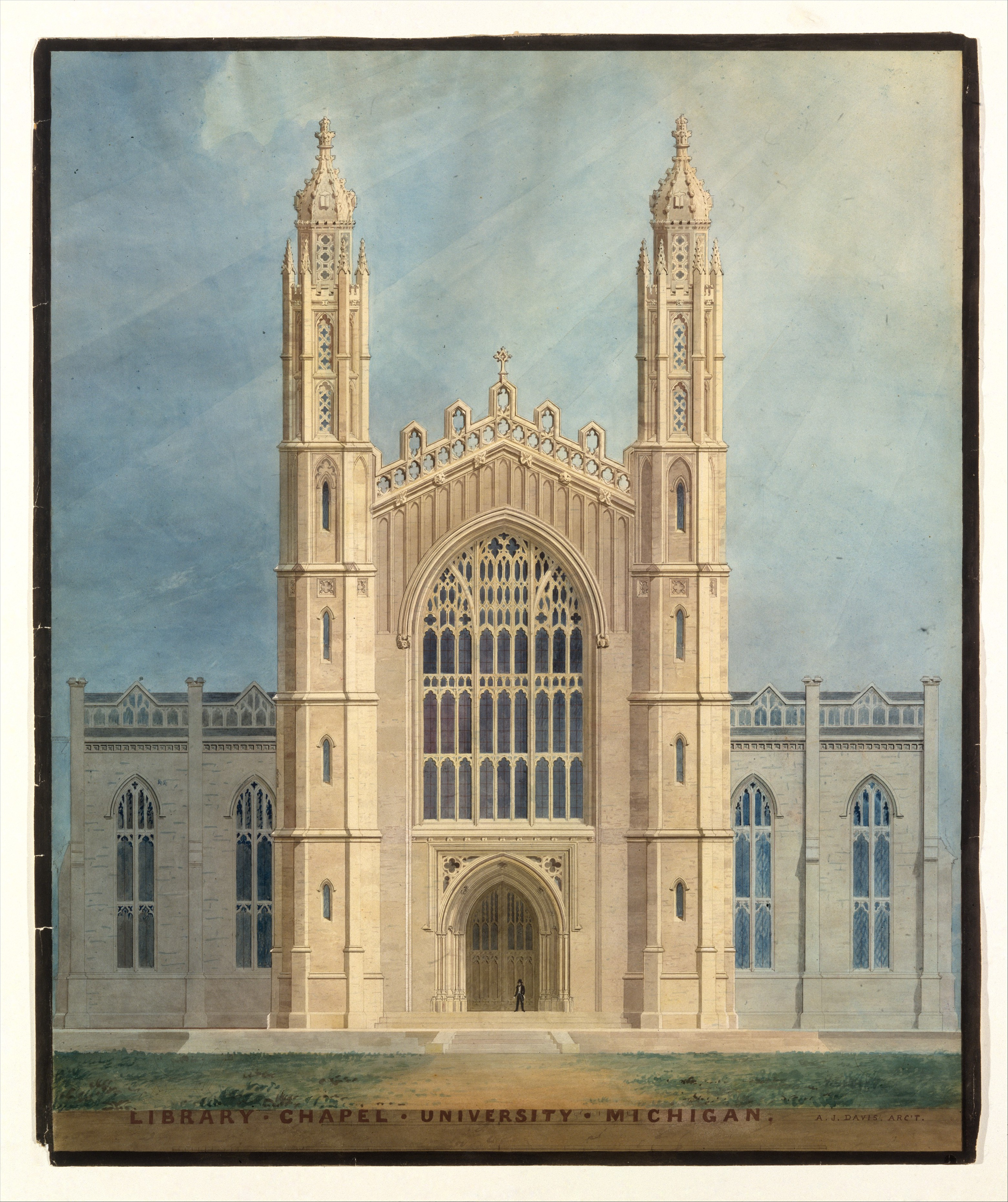
Alexander J. Davis's original designs for the university featured the Gothic Revival style. He is generally credited with coining the term "Collegiate Gothic"

Following Michigan's admission to the Union in 1837, an organic act was passed on March 18, 1837, to reorganize the university under a twelve-member board of regents. The regents met in Ann Arbor and accepted the town's proposal for the university to relocate to Judge Henry Rumsey's farmland.

The approved campus plans for the university were drawn up by the architect Alexander Davis. Davis designed an elaborate Gothic main building with a large lawn in front, wide avenues, and botanical gardens, all arranged to evoke the French château aesthetic. He also provided possible sites for future buildings; however, the plans were never executed. Instead, four houses for professors were authorized. Historians attribute the abandonment of the original plan to the financial constraints the university faced as a result of the Panic of 1837. Construction began in 1839, and in 1841, Mason Hall, the first campus building, was completed, followed by the construction of South College, a nearly identical building to the south, in 1849, leaving a gap for a future grand centerpiece.

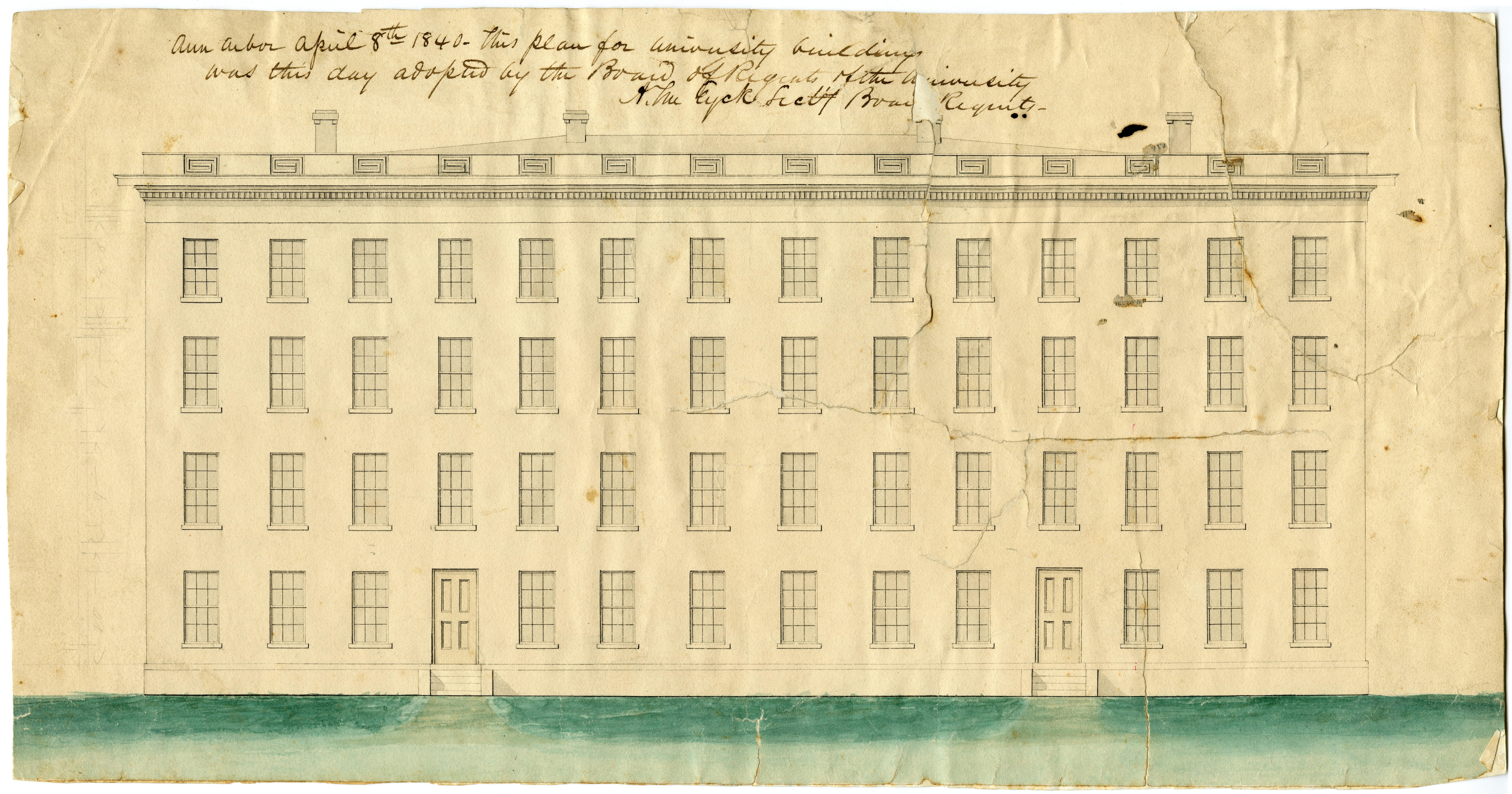
A colored elevation of Mason Hall (1841–1950), the first instructional building on the Ann Arbor campus. Its design inspired North Hall (1851) in Madison, Wisconsin

The first classes in Ann Arbor were held in 1841, with six freshmen and one sophomore taught by two professors, Joseph Whiting and George Palmer Williams. Asa Gray was the first professor appointed following the university's move to Ann Arbor in 1837. He and the regents were both involved in stocking the university library. In 1846, Louis Fasquelle, a native of France, was appointed as the first professor of modern languages, primarily teaching French and writing textbooks. French became the first modern language taught at the university. During the first commencement in 1845, eleven graduates, including Judson Collins, were awarded Bachelor of Arts degrees.

After the university moved to Ann Arbor, the regents created several branches across the state, with the Detroit Branch School being the most significant. Advocated by R. C. Gibson in 1837, it opened in the renovated University Building on Bates Street in 1838, initially serving boys with one principal and one assistant. The school operated four terms a year, with its first public examination held in 1838. Many students were parishioners of Ste. Anne Church, and notable alumni included Anson Burlingame and E. C. Walker. Other branches were established in cities like Pontiac, Kalamazoo, Niles, and Tecumseh, but struggled with enrollment, leading some to merge with local colleges, such as Kalamazoo College, which was affiliated with the University of Michigan from 1840 to 1850.

The administration during the early years of the university was complicated and designed to keep it tightly under state authority. The university's business was often intertwined with state affairs. The position of chancellor of the university, created by the organic act in 1837, was never filled, and the positions on the board of regents, appointed by the governor, were often held by state officials. The lieutenant governor, the justices of the Michigan Supreme Court, and the chancellor of the state all served as ex officio members of the board, with the governor himself chairing the board. The regents' powers were shared with a rotating roster of professors, who were responsible for some vague aspects of the university's administrative duties; however, all important decisions had to be made by the governor and his party. There were several attempts to gain independence from the state legislature, but progress was slow until the late 1840s, when the regents gained leverage, supported by Michigan citizens. This shift culminated in a revision of the organic act on April 8, 1851, which freed the university from legislative control, transitioned the regent positions from appointed to elected, and established a president selected by the regents.

=== 1851–1910 ===
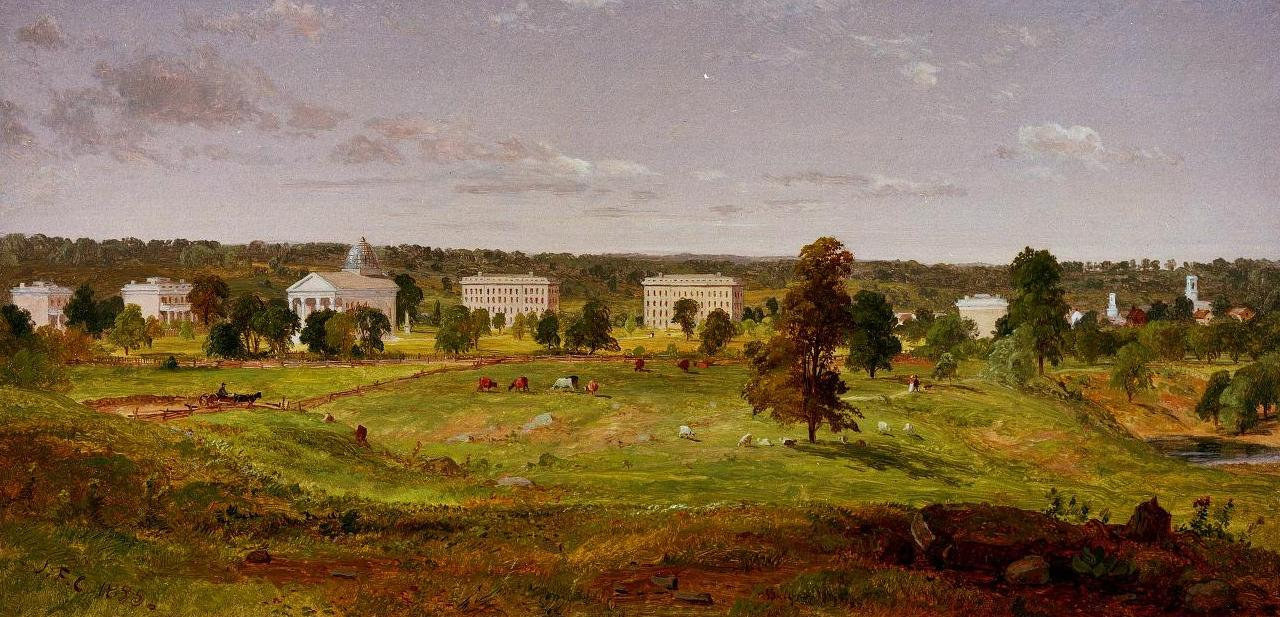
University of Michigan (1855) by Jasper Francis Cropsey

Henry Philip Tappan became the university's first president in 1852, with the ambition to shape the institution as a model for future universities. During his decade of service, he overhauled the curriculum, expanded the library and museum collections, established the law school, and supervised the construction of the Detroit Observatory. He secularized faculty appointments by prioritizing merit in selections, breaking away from the retrograde tradition of regents distributing positions among Protestant denominations. In 1855, Michigan became the second university in the country to issue Bachelor of Science degrees. The following year, the country's first chemical laboratory was built on campus, specifically designed for chemistry education, providing additional space for classes and laboratories. Tappan's tenure also saw the creation of the Michigan Glee Club, the oldest student organization at the university, and the publication of the first student newspaper, The Peninsular Phoenix and Gazetteer, in 1857. Despite these accomplishments, Tappan's 11-year presidency was marked by considerable tension. His impartial stance on religion faced backlash during a time of heightened religious fervor. Due to changes in the Board of Regents and discontent with his administration, he was forced to resign in 1863.

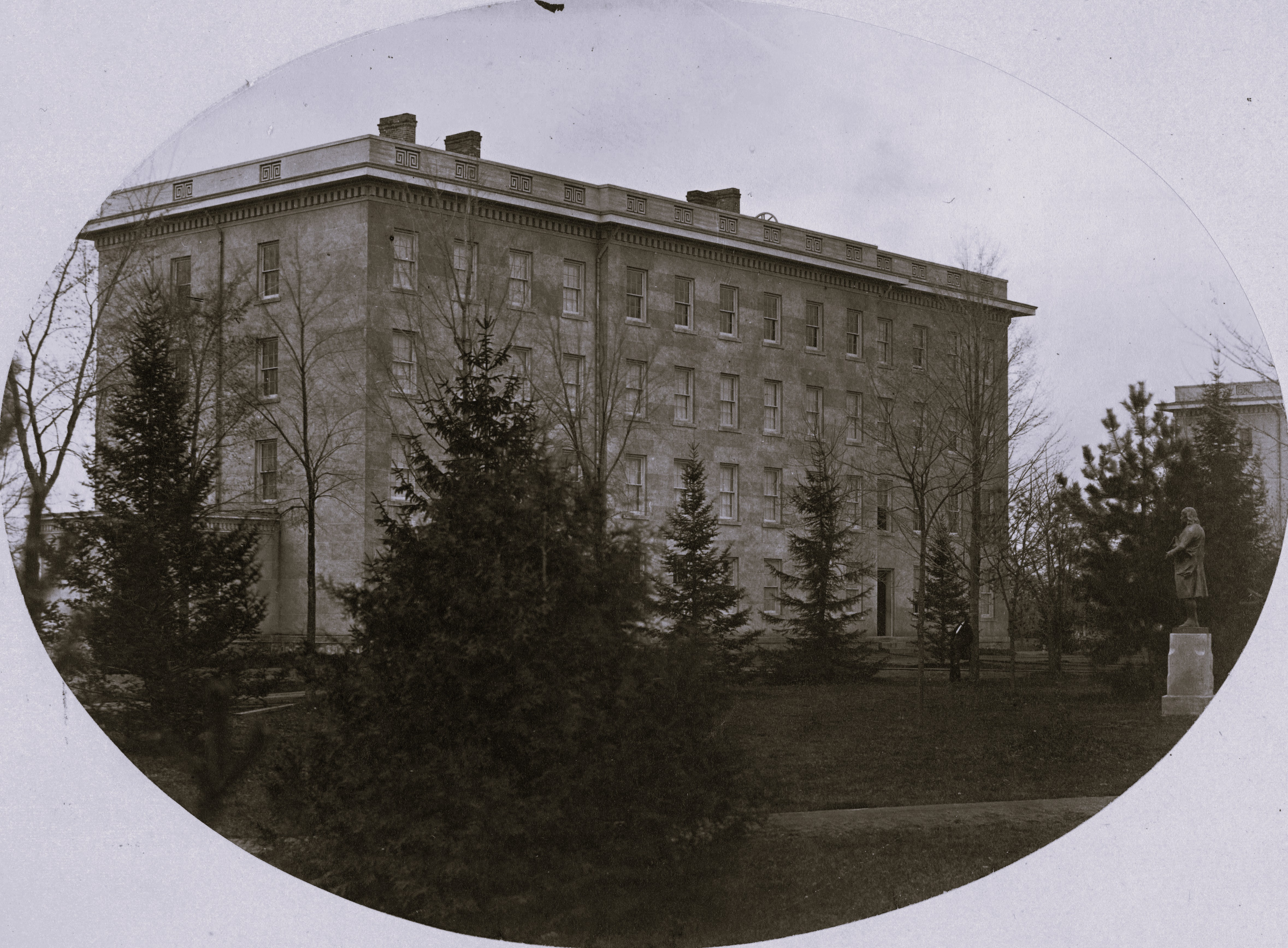
Mason Hall, with a statue of Benjamin Franklin in front. Photograph taken prior to 1870.

In 1863, Erastus Otis Haven took office as president, having been a professor at the time and needing to prove his right for the presidency. The campus was divided by conflicting views among students, faculty, and regents regarding Tappan's restoration, the homeopathy crisis, and the Civil War. Haven's administration faced routine administrative difficulties and struggled to garner support for increased state aid, despite achieving modest gains. The university, which had received a fixed $15,000 since 1869, still required additional funding. Frustrated, Haven resigned in 1869 to become president of Northwestern, a Methodist institution, a move that sectarians viewed as a setback for secular colleges. The presidency remained vacant from 1869 to 1871, with Professor Henry Simmons Frieze serving as acting president. During this period, the university raised funds for University Hall, overhauled admissions with a diploma system, and introduced coeducation. Women were first admitted in 1870, although Alice Robinson Boise Wood was the first woman to attend classes in 1866. In 1871, Sarah Killgore became the first woman to graduate from law school and be admitted to the bar of any state in the United States. Frieze, a champion of music education, also established the University Musical Society. By the late 1860s, the university had become one of the largest in the nation, alongside Harvard in Cambridge. However, it faced ongoing issues with student discipline, including class rushes, instances of hazing, and rowdiness in chapel. Frieze attributed these problems to a lack of centralized faculty control.

The first African American to graduate from the university was Gabriel Franklin Hargo in 1870 when he earned a law degree. The first African American to earn a Doctor of Medicine (MD) degree from the University of Michigan Medical School was William Henry Fitzbutler, which he earned in 1872. Mary Henrietta Graham became the first African-American woman to be admitted to the university in 1876, and she was also the first to graduate in 1880 when she earned a Bachelor’s of Philosophy degree in literature.

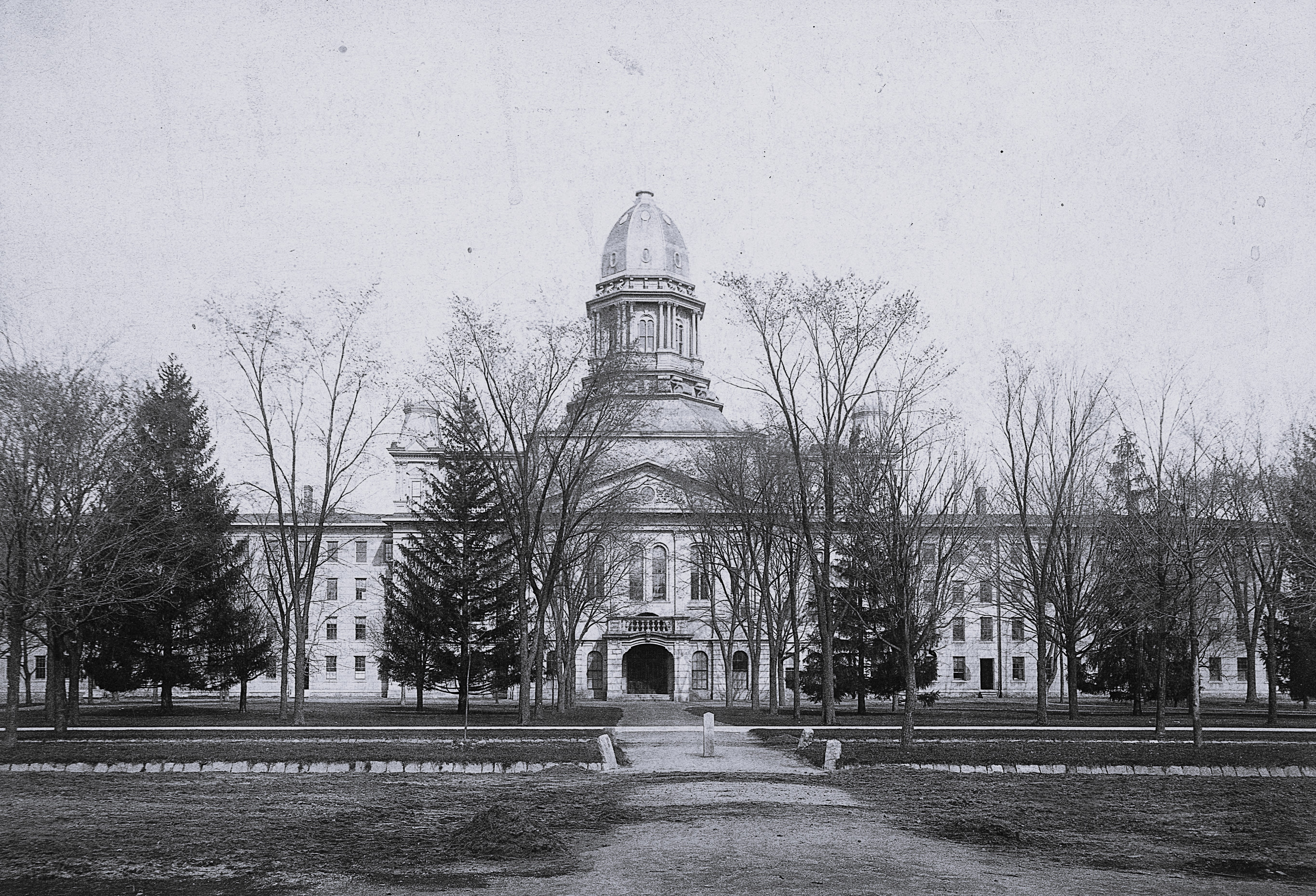
University Hall (center, 1872–1950), flanked by Mason Hall (left, 1841–1950) and South College (right, 1849–1950), was located partly on the grounds of present-day Angell Hall.

James Burrill Angell became president in 1871 and would remain in the post for nearly four decades. His tenure would be remembered as the most successful in the university's history. Tappan's reforms in the 1850s set the university on a path to becoming an elite institution, but it was Angell who completed that transformation. Shortly after Angell's arrival, University Hall was completed at vast expense; it would remain the university's major academic building right up until the 1950s. During his presidency, Angell restored campus discipline, raised entrance and graduation requirements, and persuaded the legislature to increase state aid. Angell's tenure saw the addition of many extracurricular activities, including the intercollegiate football team. Though a reformer, Angell was not authoritarian; he encouraged open debate and aimed for near-unanimous agreement before implementing changes, rather than pushing through with only a narrow majority. This approach enabled him to address knotty issues on campus, including the long-standing homeopathy problem. Angell transformed the curriculum to focus on electives, expanding course offerings. That led to a faculty of great minds in many fields, from John Dewey in philosophy to Frederick George Novy in bacteriology. In 1875, the university founded the College of Dental Surgery, followed by the establishment of the College of Pharmacy by Albert B. Prescott in 1876. That year, the university awarded its first Doctor of Philosophy degrees: to Victor C. Vaughan in chemistry and William E. Smith in zoology. They were among the first doctoral degrees to be conferred in the nation.

"Stand up for America; devote your life to its cause; love your homes, and prove as worthy of our cherished free institutions as they are worthy of your allegiance and service. Let not the high standard of National Honor, raised by the fathers, be lowered by their sons. Let learning, liberty and law be exalted and enthroned."

— William McKinley, speaking to the first National Convention of the College Republicans in Newberry Hall in 1892

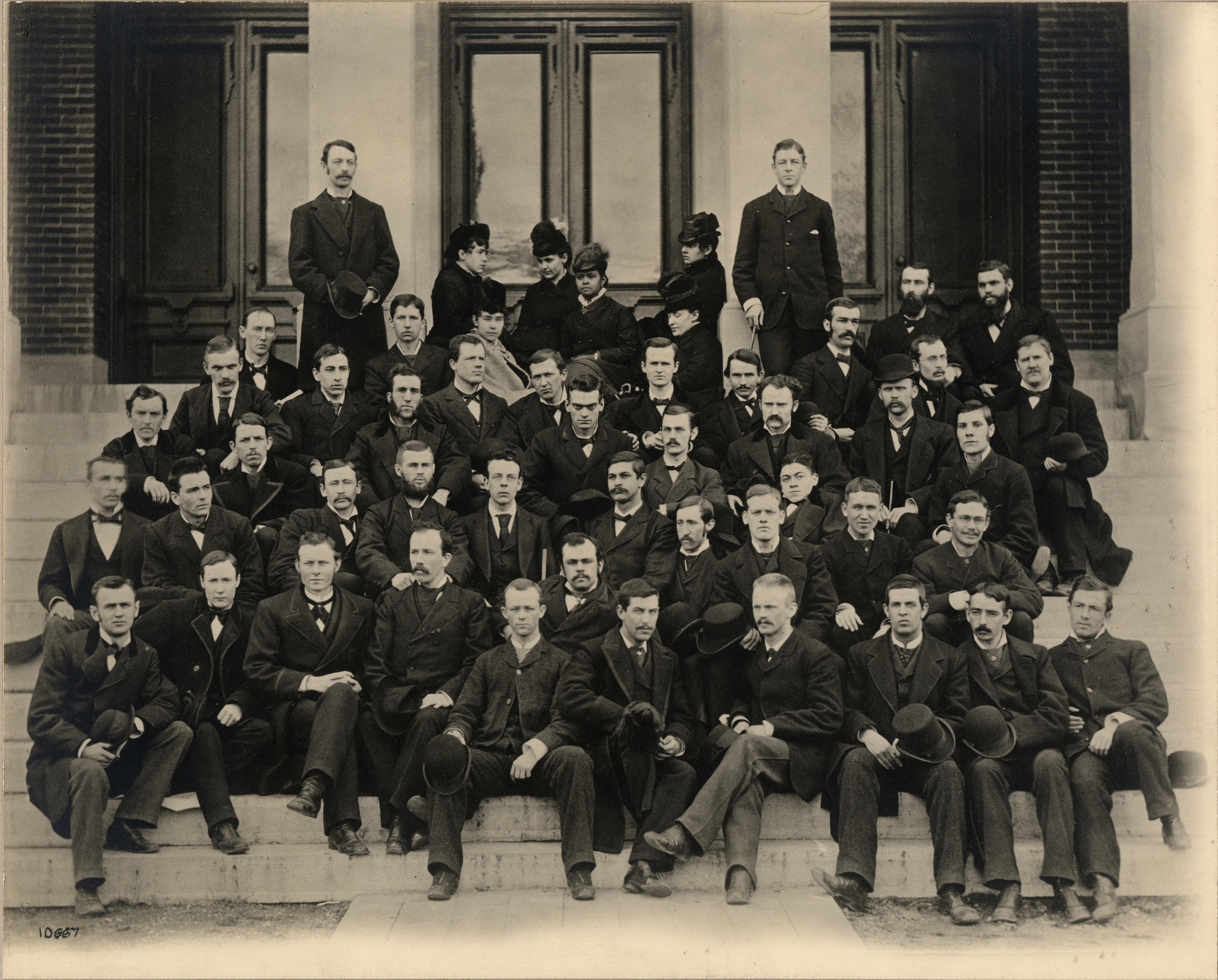
Literary Class of 1880 (includes Mary Henrietta Graham, the first African American woman graduate of the University of Michigan)

With his presidency, Angell focused the university on preparing a new generation of statesmen for public service. Angell himself was frequently called upon by the White House for diplomatic missions. In 1880, President Rutherford Hayes appointed him as Minister to China, where he successfully negotiated an immigration treaty that facilitated foreign student enrollment. Later, in 1887, 1896, and 1897, President Grover Cleveland appointed him to fisheries and waterways commissions. That same year, President William McKinley named him Envoy Extraordinary to Turkey. By the late 19th century, the university had gained an international reputation, in large part due to Angell's diplomatic efforts. The university was one of the largest hosts of the pensionado scholars during the early 20th century, welcoming Filipino youths who usually came from elite, upper-class backgrounds and traveled across the Pacific Ocean from the Philippines to study in the United States. Among them was Santiago Artiaga, the late governor of Bukidnon. Meanwhile, Michigan alumni such as Dean Conant Worcester and George A. Malcolm helped shape the institutions of the Philippines. Despite his extensive travels, Angell remained deeply connected to his students; campus lore has it that the aging president's memory was so sharp that he knew every student by name. Angell retired in 1909, and seven years later, he died in the President's House, which had been his home for forty-five years. His successor, Harry Burns Hutchins, who was once his student, would lead the university through World War I and the Great Influenza epidemic.

=== 1910–1950 ===
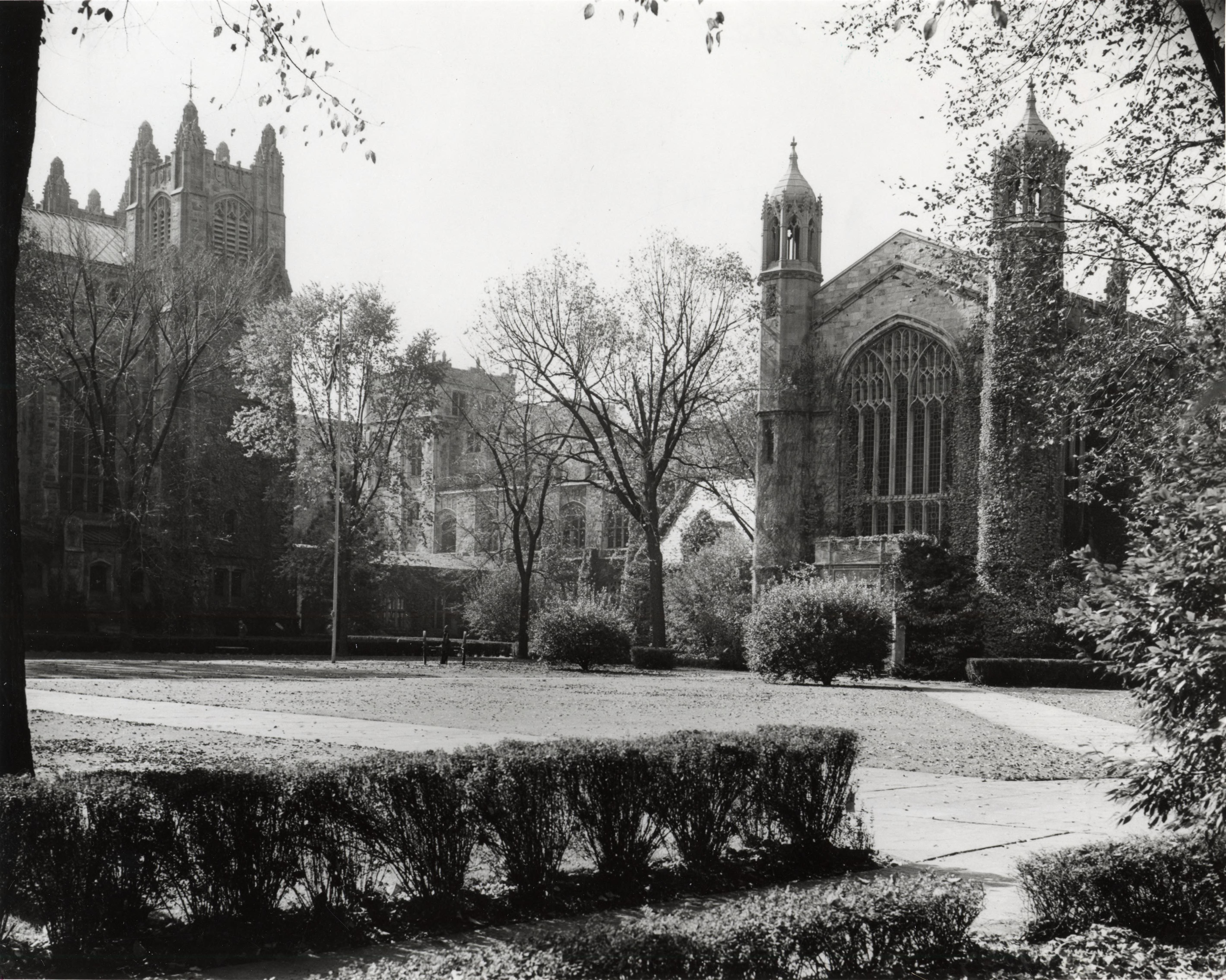
Law Quadrangle, ca. 1930s

In 1910, Harry Burns Hutchins assumed the presidency, becoming the first alumnus to hold that position. He had spent seven years in Ithaca, New York, where he was called by Andrew Dickson White and Charles Kendall Adams to establish the Cornell Law School. Hutchins then became the dean of the law school at his alma mater, where he introduced the case method of instruction. Hutchins was acting president when Angell was absent. During his presidency, Hutchins established the Graduate School, doubled enrollment, and increased the faculty. He secured more state aid and alumni support to fund the university's capital needs, including the gothic Law Quadrangle, Martha Cook Building, Hill Auditorium, and Michigan Union, which became campus landmarks. Hutchins enhanced the university health service, but wartime distractions plagued his presidency. The influenza epidemic, which caused student deaths from poor care, deeply troubled him. Well-liked by the regents who encouraged him to remain president, nonetheless, Hutchins retired in 1920.

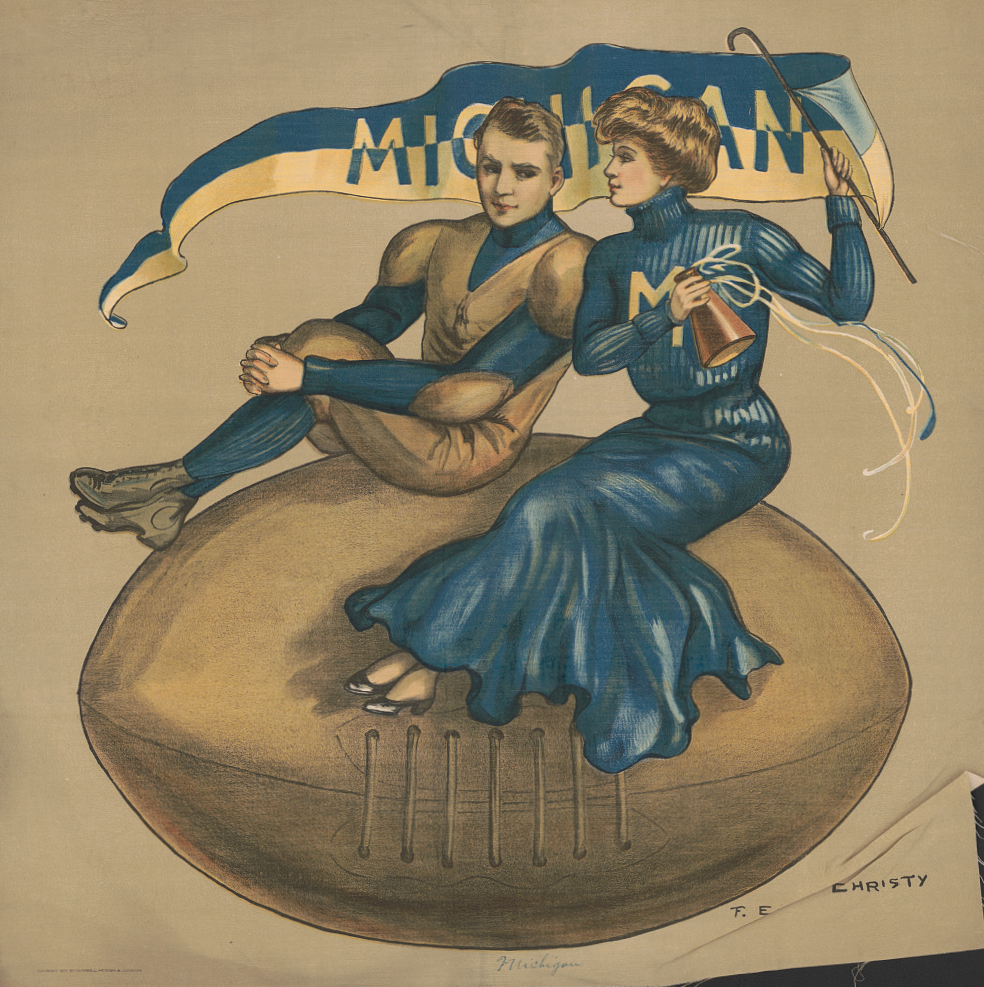
A 1907 postcard illustrated by F. Earl Christy that features a Michigan football theme

The 1920s at the university were marked by the brief tenures of two presidents, Marion LeRoy Burton and Clarence Cook Little. In 1920, when Burton assumed office, a conference on higher education took place at the university, resulting in the establishment of the Association of Governing Boards of Universities and Colleges. Under his leadership, construction boomed on campus, and enrollments increased, propelled by the prosperous economy of the Roaring Twenties. He initiated the annual honors convocation, introduced the deans' conference, and increased university income. Burton fell ill in 1924 and died in 1925. In this emergency, President Emeritus Hutchins was called by the regents to assist, with Alfred Henry Lloyd serving as acting president until Little's arrival. Clarence Cook Little was elected president in 1925. He was considered a polarizing figure due to his progressive stance, which alienated many Roman Catholics. The proposal for establishing a nonsectarian divinity school on campus came after strong advocacy from Charles Foster Kent and received unanimous backing from nearby churches. However, this school was short-lived and was quietly shelved in 1927 during Little's presidency. Little advocated for individualized education and sought to reform curricula, particularly for women. He proposed a curriculum division after two years of study to address knowledge gaps, which led to the University College proposal. This initiative was ultimately abandoned following his resignation in 1929.

Michigan Symposium in Theoretical Physics, 1928 to 1941

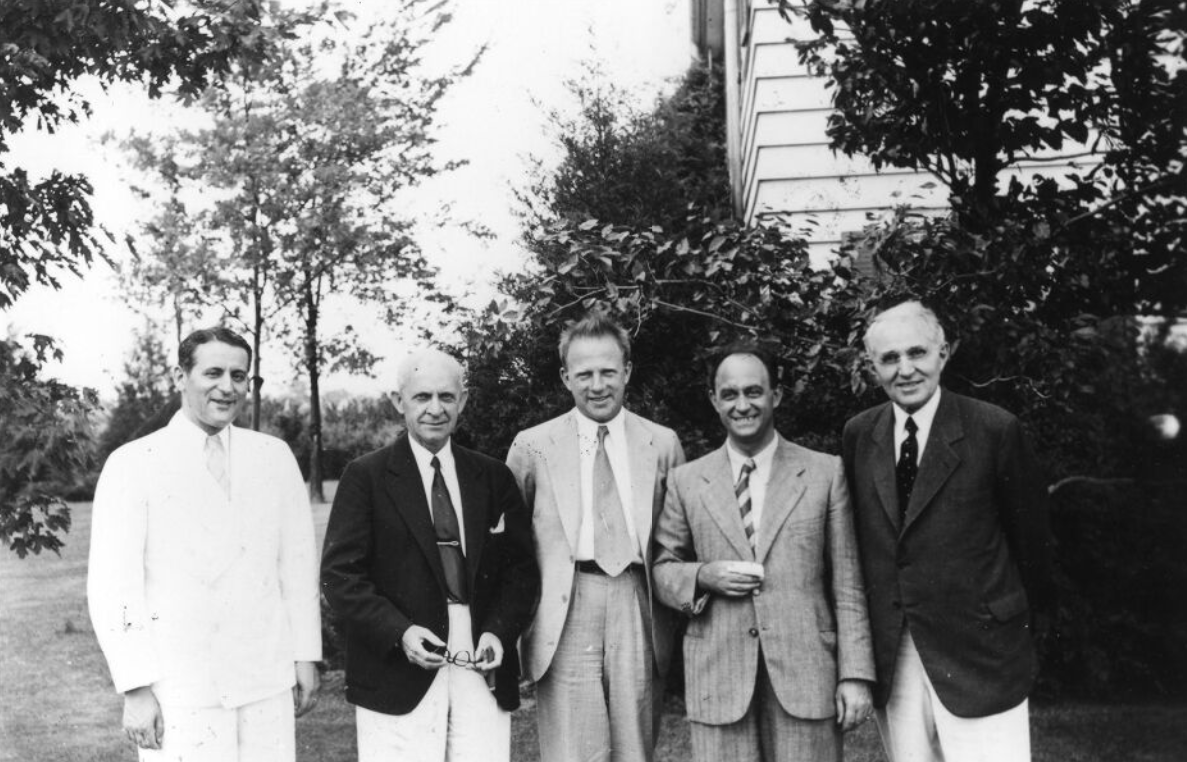
Samuel Goudsmit, Clarence Yoakum, Werner Heisenberg, Enrico Fermi, and Edward H. Kraus attending the symposium

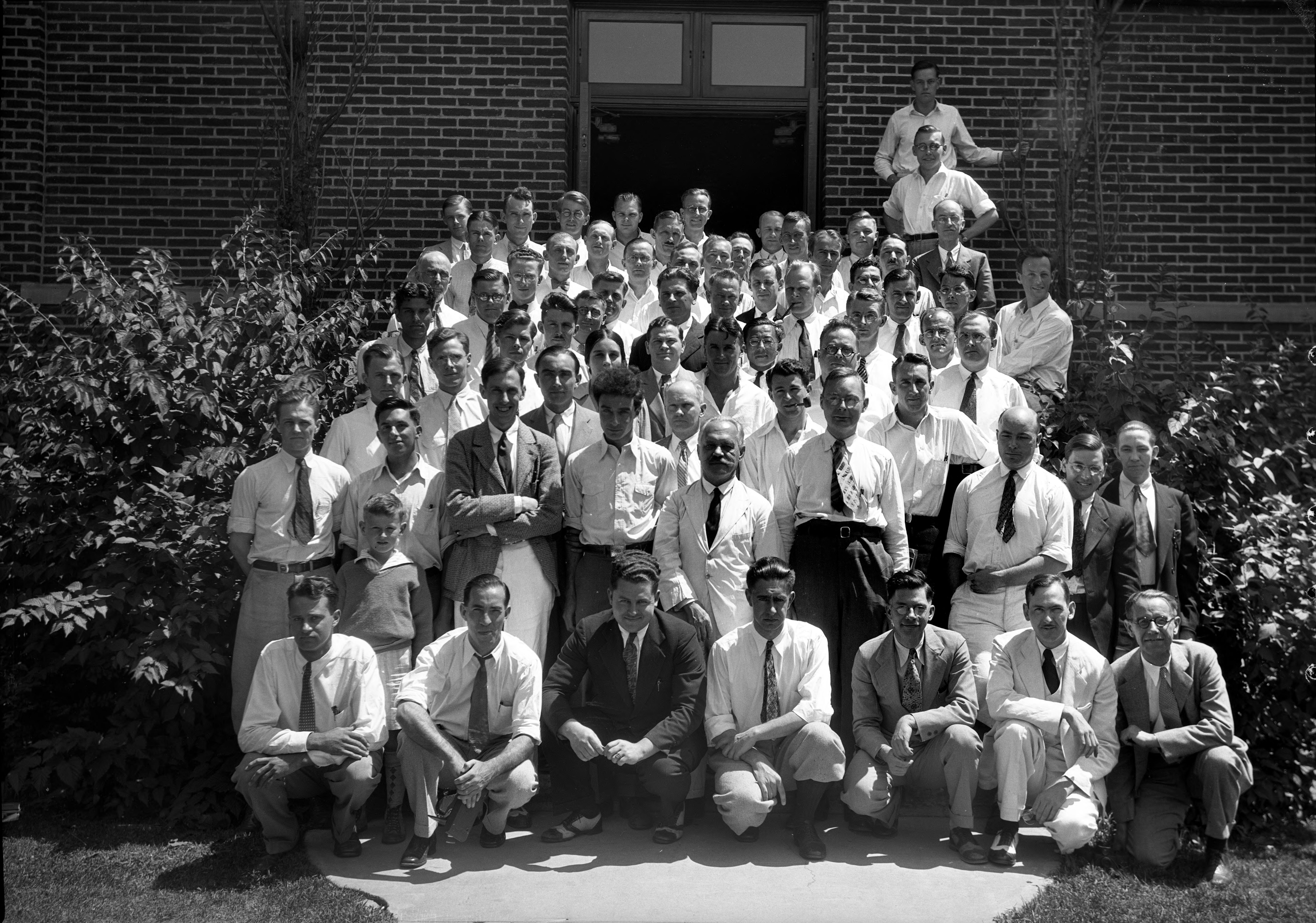
H.A. Kramers, second row, sixth left with J. Robert Oppenheimer, second row, fourth left, in a photograph of the symposium

Following Little's resignation, Alexander Grant Ruthven, an alumnus, was elected president by unanimous vote. He would lead the university through the Great Depression and World War II. Under Ruthven's leadership, the university administration became more decentralized with the creation of the university council, various divisions, and a system of committees. For years, the university was a backwater in theoretical physics. Nonetheless, this changed under department head Harrison McAllister Randall, who brought theorists Oskar Klein, George Uhlenbeck and Samuel Goudsmit onto the faculty. Goudsmit mentored famous students at the university, including Robert Bacher and Wu Ta-You, the Father of Chinese Physics, who in turn taught Zhu Guangya and two Nobel laureates, Chen Ning Yang and Tsung-Dao Lee. From 1928 to 1941, the Summer Symposium in Theoretical Physics featured renowned physicists like Niels Bohr, Werner Heisenberg, Paul Dirac, and Erwin Schrödinger, with at least fifteen attendees being Nobel laureates or future laureates. Wolfgang Pauli held a visiting professorship at the university in 1931. Stephen Timoshenko created the first U.S. bachelor's and doctoral programs in engineering mechanics when he was a faculty professor at the university. In 1948, shortly after World War II, the Michigan Memorial Phoenix Project was established to honor the hundreds of lives lost from the university during the war. Funded by numerous contributors, including the Ford Motor Company, the Phoenix Project operated the Ford Nuclear Reactor, which established the nation's first academic program in nuclear science and engineering.

Marjorie Lee Browne became one of the first two African-American women to obtain a Ph.D. in mathematics and the first to earn the degree from this university when she completed her degree requirements in 1949 and participated in the graduation ceremony in 1950.

=== 1950–2000 ===
For most of the 19th and early 20th centuries, Michigan stood as the sole university within the state, and its alumni often dominated state politics. However, by the mid-20th century, the landscape began to shift as new universities emerged, many of which were former technical schools, thereby threatening that status quo. When Harlan Hatcher took office as president in 1951, he was entrusted with securing the university's preeminence among the nation and world's burgeoning research institutions.

This marked the beginning of a phase of post-war development, during which Hatcher oversaw the construction of North Campus, the founding of Flint Campus, and the establishment of the Dearborn Campus. The latter two of which have since evolved into fully accredited universities, under the auspices of the Board of Regents. Nonetheless, the tenures of Hatcher and his successor, Robben Wright Fleming, were marked by a sharp rise in campus activism, linked to the Civil Rights Movement and the anti-Vietnam War movement. In 1963, a controversial set of race-conscious admission policies, collectively known as "affirmative action", was first introduced. These radical measures, originated by Hobart Taylor Jr., aimed to boost Black student enrollment at elite universities. In 1964, a group of faculty hosted the nation's first teach-in against U.S. foreign policy in Southeast Asia, attended by thousands of students. Meanwhile, Hatcher controversially dismissed three professors for their refusal to cooperate with Joseph McCarthy's House Un-American Activities Committee during his tenure. Hatcher's successor, Robben Wright Fleming guided the university through a turbulent era of activism. In 1969, a year into Fleming's tenure, the Weather Underground, the militant group that famously declared war on the United States, was founded on campus. A year later, a strike organized by the Black Action Movement resulted in the university agreeing to several demands for minority support. In 1971, the Spectrum Center was founded as the nation's oldest collegiate LGBT student center. Meanwhile, support among students for marijuana legalization was gaining traction on campus, as evidenced by the annual Hash Bash rally that began in 1972. Throughout the 1960s and 1970s, campus unrest began to diminish the university's academic standing, which had been ranked among the top five in the nation. That standing started to decline during Fleming's tenure. Campus unrest persisted during Harold Tafler Shapiro's presidency, which began in 1980, fueled by controversies surrounding the university's national defense initiatives and foreign investments.

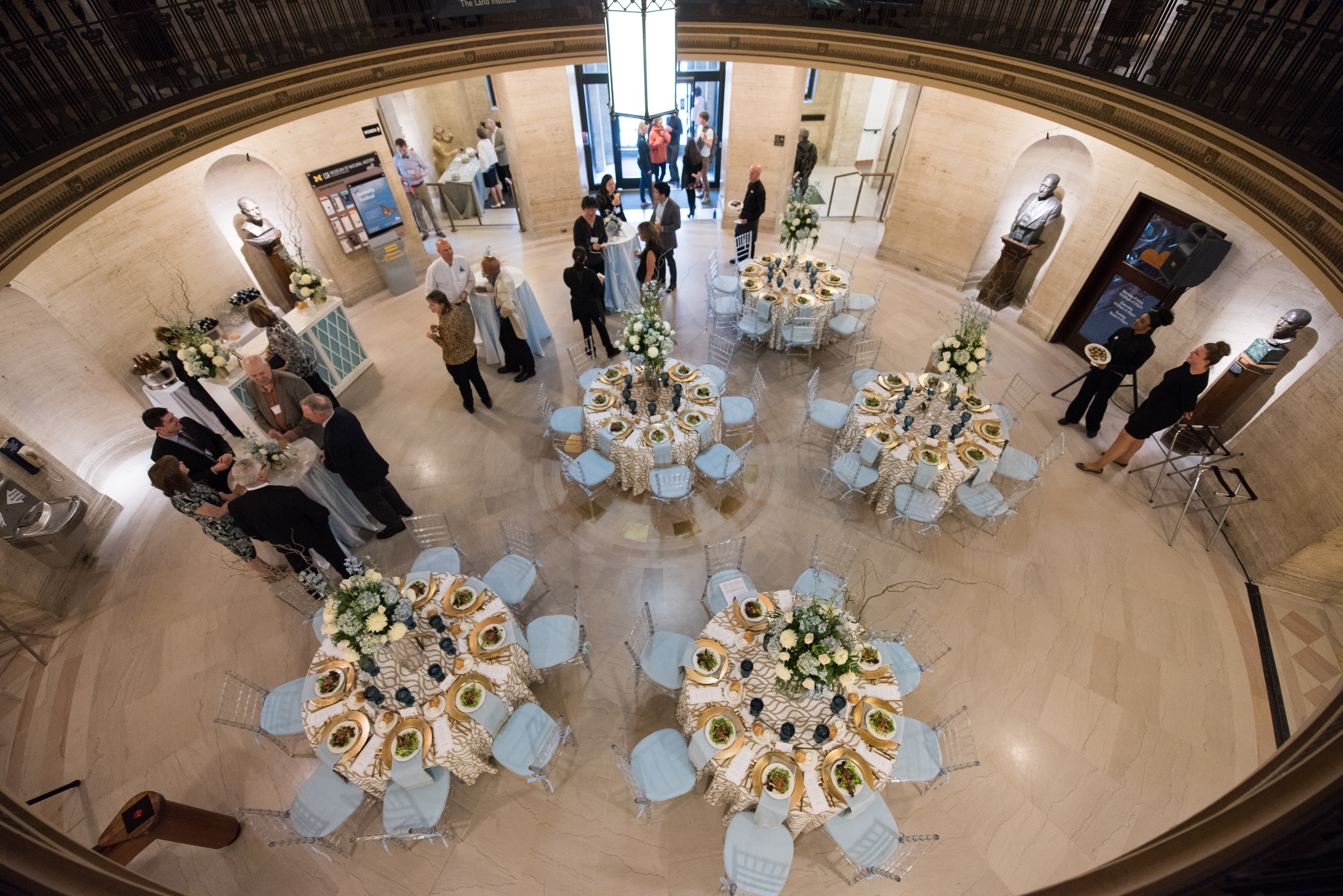
A celebratory dinner for the university's matriculating PhD students in 2017

President James Duderstadt would succeed Shapiro and remain president until 1996. He supported campus growth and fundraising initiatives. Homer A Neal served as interim President in 1996 until Duderstadt's successor, Lee Bollinger, who oversaw the construction of the School of Social Work building and Tisch Hall, named after alumnus Preston Robert Tisch.

=== 2000–present ===
In 2002, B. Joseph White served as interim President after the unexpected resignation of Bollinger. In 2003, the U.S. Supreme Court heard two cases regarding the university's affirmative action admissions: Grutter v. Bollinger and Gratz v. Bollinger. In 2002, the university elected its first female president, Mary Sue Coleman, by unanimous vote. Throughout her presidency, Michigan's endowment saw continued growth, accompanied by a major fundraising drive known as "The Michigan Difference". The Coleman's administration faced labor disputes with the university's labor unions, notably with the Lecturers' Employees Organization and the Graduate Employees Organization. In the early 2000s, the university faced declining state funding, prompting suggestions for privatization. Despite being a state institution de jure, it adopted private funding models. A 2008 legislative panel further recommended converting it to a private institution due to its minimal ties to the state. Mark Schlissel succeeded Coleman in 2014. Before his firing in 2022, Schlissel expanded financial aid offerings, enhanced international engagement, and raised student diversity. He also led initiatives in biosciences and the arts. Schlissel's successor, Santa Ono, would serve a short and lackluster tenure amid the national pro-Palestinian protests before his immediate resignation. The presidency has remained vacant since then, with Domenico Grasso serving as the interim president. In 2026, C. Cybele Raver was elected President, to begin her term on 1 Dec 2026.

=== Historical links ===
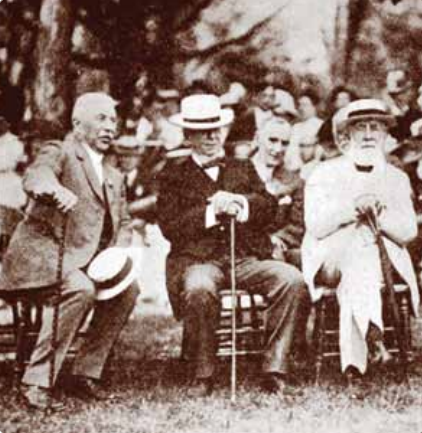
University presidents Harry Burns Hutchins, left, and James Burrill Angell, center, with Cornell University founder Andrew Dickson White, right, in a 1900s photograph

The University of Michigan in the 19th century was influenced by the transatlantic Republic of Letters, an intellectual community that spanned Europe and the Americas. Key figures, such as Henry Philip Tappan, were instrumental in aligning the university with the ideals championed by the intellectual community, including liberty, reason, and scientific inquiry. Alumni and faculty from Michigan, like Andrew Dixon White, carried these ideals forward as they shaped other institutions. Notably, Cornell alumni David Starr Jordan and John Casper Branner later introduced these concepts to Stanford University in the late 19th century. Early university leaders like James Burrill Angell contributed to establishing other universities by sharing their insights. Alongside Charles William Eliot of Harvard, Andrew D. White of Cornell, and Noah Porter of Yale, Angell was heavily involved in the early period of Johns Hopkins University as an advisor to the trustees and recommended Daniel Coit Gilman as the first president of the wealthy new foundation. Clark Kerr, the first chancellor of the University of California, Berkeley, referred to Michigan as the "mother of state universities". From 1865 to 1910, the university belonged to an elite group of institutions that significantly influenced the development of modern American higher education.

- University of California: had its early planning based upon the University of Michigan. (Note: Page 138 of this source incorrectly states that the date of the final negotiations in which Governor Low participated was October 8, 1869, but it is clear from the context and the endnotes to that page (which cite documents from 1867) that the reference to 1869 is a typo.)
- University of Chicago: Michigan alumnus Robert Ezra Park played a leading role in the development of the Chicago School of sociology. The University of Chicago Laboratory School was founded in 1896 by John Dewey and Calvin Brainerd Cady, who were members of the Michigan faculty.
- Cornell University: Andrew Dixon White and Charles Kendall Adams, the first and second presidents of Cornell, respectively, were members of the Michigan faculty. Cornell had its Law School founded by Michigan alumni Charles Kendall Adams and Harry Burns Hutchins. Six of the fourteen past presidents of Cornell University have had connections to the University of Michigan. Edmund Ezra Day, the fifth president, was the founding dean of Michigan's business school. Frank H. T. Rhodes, the ninth president, spent three years as vice president of academic affairs at Michigan. Martha E. Pollack, the fourteenth president, served as provost at Michigan from 2013 to 2017. Additionally, Jeffrey S. Lehman received his graduate degrees from Michigan.
- Harvard University: Michigan alumnus Edwin Francis Gay was the founding dean of the Harvard Business School from 1908 to 1919, instrumental in the school's planning.
- Johns Hopkins University: had its pharmacology department established by John Jacob Abel, an alumnus of Michigan.
- Massachusetts Institute of Technology: had its Media Lab co-founded by Michigan alumnus Jerome Wiesner. Nicholas Negroponte, the co-founder and Chairman Emeritus of the Media Lab, has held a visiting professorship at the University of Michigan.
- Northwestern University: Michigan alumnus Henry Wade Rogers was instrumental in transforming Northwestern from a small cluster of colleges into a major, nationally recognized university. His wife, Emma Winner Rogers, founded the Northwestern University Settlement Association.
- Syracuse University: Alexander Winchell and Erastus O. Haven, the first and second chancellors of Syracuse University, respectively, were members of the Michigan faculty.
- University of Washington: Charles Odegaard, who served as president of the University of Washington from 1958 to 1973 and is credited with elevating its academic standing, was previously the dean of Michigan's College of Literature, Science, and the Arts.
- Wellesley College: Michigan alumna Alice Freeman Palmer, the president of Wellesley College from 1881 to 1887, "transformed the fledgling school from one devoted to Christian domesticity into one of the nation's premier colleges for women."
- Yale University: had its residential college system co-organized by James Rowland Angell, a graduate of Michigan. Michigan alumnus Henry Wade Rogers introduced the "case system" and the college degree requirement into the Yale Law School.

== Campus ==
University of Michigan Campus Historic buildings Museums Libraries Arts venues Housing and dining Open spaces Sports University of Michigan campus

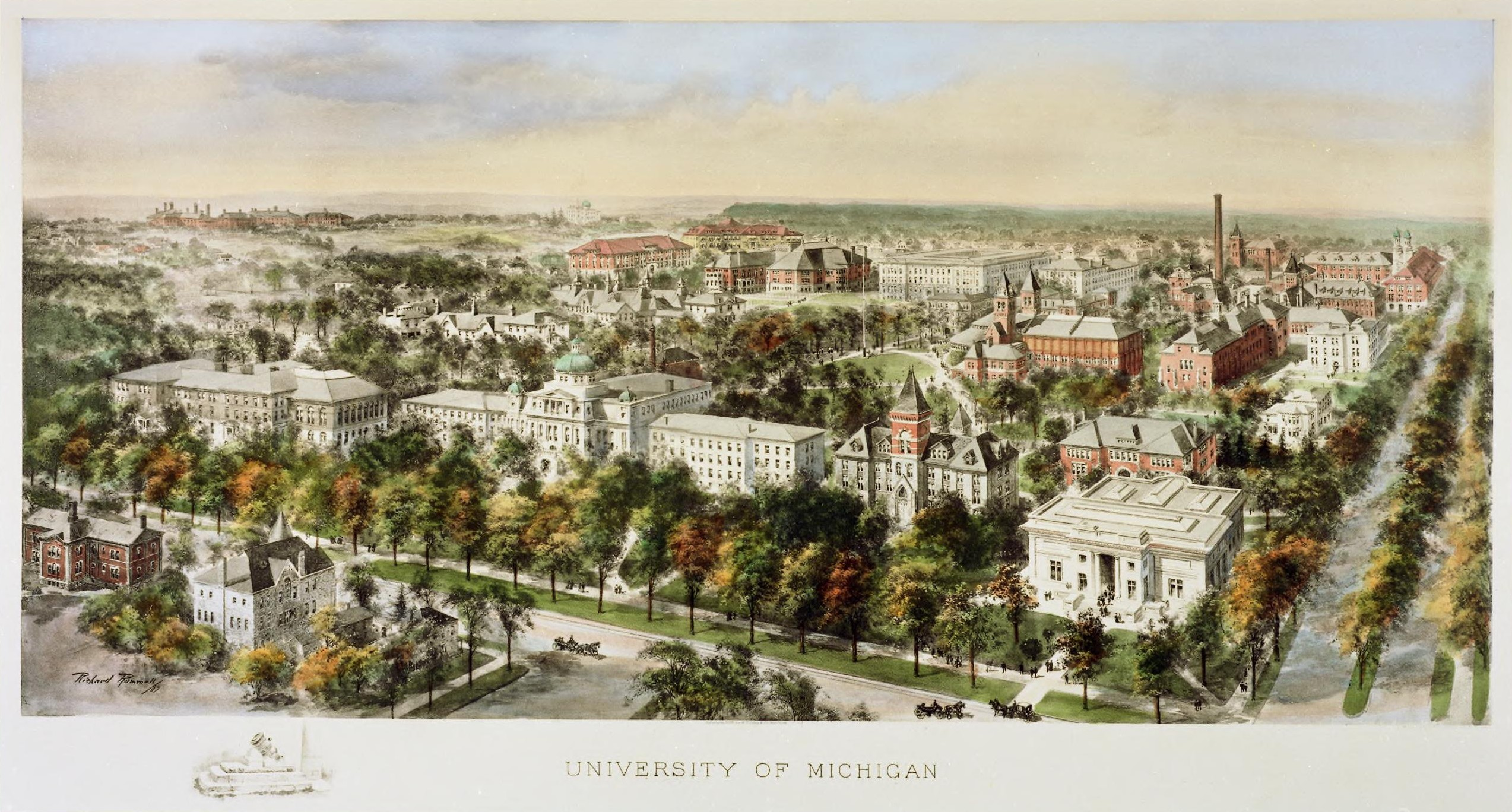
A hand-colored lithograph depicting a view of the University of Michigan by Richard Rummell in 1907

The University of Michigan's campus in Ann Arbor is divided into four main areas: the Central Campus area, the North Campus area, the North Medical Campus area, and Ross Athletic Campus area. The campus areas include more than 500 major buildings, with a combined area of more than 37.48 million square feet (860 acres; 3.482 km^{2}). The Central and Athletic Campus areas are contiguous, while the North Campus area is separated from them, primarily by the Huron River. The North Medical Campus area was developed on Plymouth Road, with several university-owned buildings for outpatient care, diagnostics, and outpatient surgery.

There is leased space in buildings scattered throughout the city, many occupied by organizations affiliated with the University of Michigan Health System. In addition to the University of Michigan Golf Course on Ross Athletic Campus, the university operates a second golf course on Geddes Road called Radrick Farms Golf Course. The university also operates a large office building called Wolverine Tower in southern Ann Arbor. The Inglis House is an off-campus facility, which the university has owned since the 1950s. The Inglis House is a 10,000-square-foot (930 m^{2}) mansion used to hold various social events, including meetings of the Board of Regents, and to host visiting dignitaries. Another major off-campus facility is the Matthaei Botanical Gardens, which is located on the eastern outskirts of the City of Ann Arbor.

=== Central Campus Historic District ===
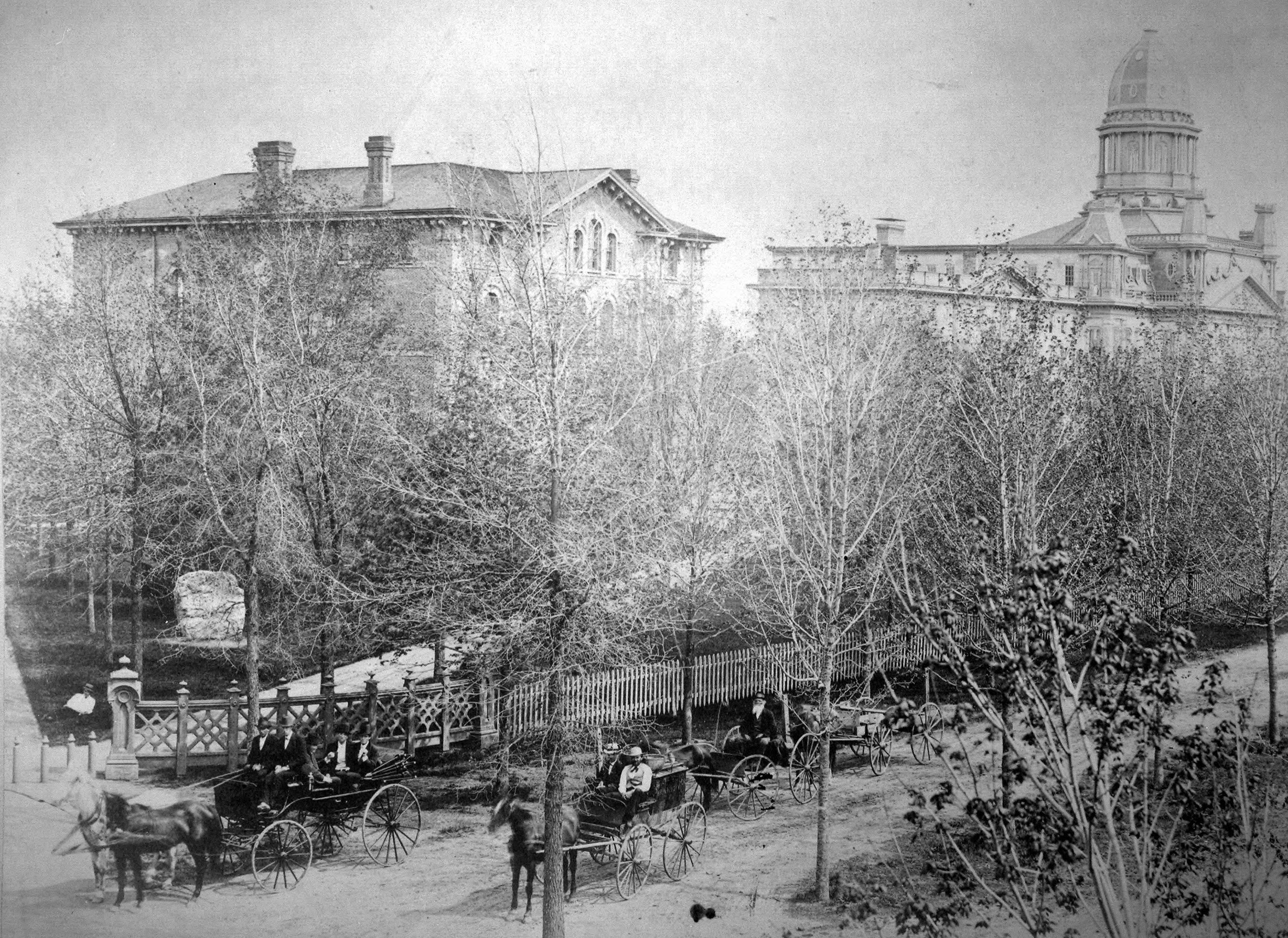
The northwest corner of The Diag around 1873, showing the university's gate, the Law Building (1863–1950) and University Hall (1872–1950)

The original Central Campus spanned 40 acres (16 ha), bordered by North University Avenue, South University Avenue, East University Avenue, and State Street. The master plan was developed by Alexander Jackson Davis. The first structures built included four Greek Revival faculty residences in 1840, as well as Mason Hall (1841–1950) and South College (1849–1950), which functioned as both academic spaces and dormitories. Only one of the original faculty residences remains today; it has been renovated in the Italianate style to serve as the President's House, making it the oldest building on campus. The Chemical Laboratory, built by Albert Jordan in 1856 and operational until 1980, was notable for housing the nation's first instructional chemistry lab. After the completion of the Old Medical Building (1850–1914) and the Law Building (1863–1950), an open space known as The Diag began to take shape. Among the notable structures on the original Central Campus were University Hall (1872–1950), designed by alumnus E. S. Jennison, and the Old Library (1881–1918), designed by Henry Van Brunt, who was also the architect behind Memorial Hall (1870) in Cambridge, Massachusetts.

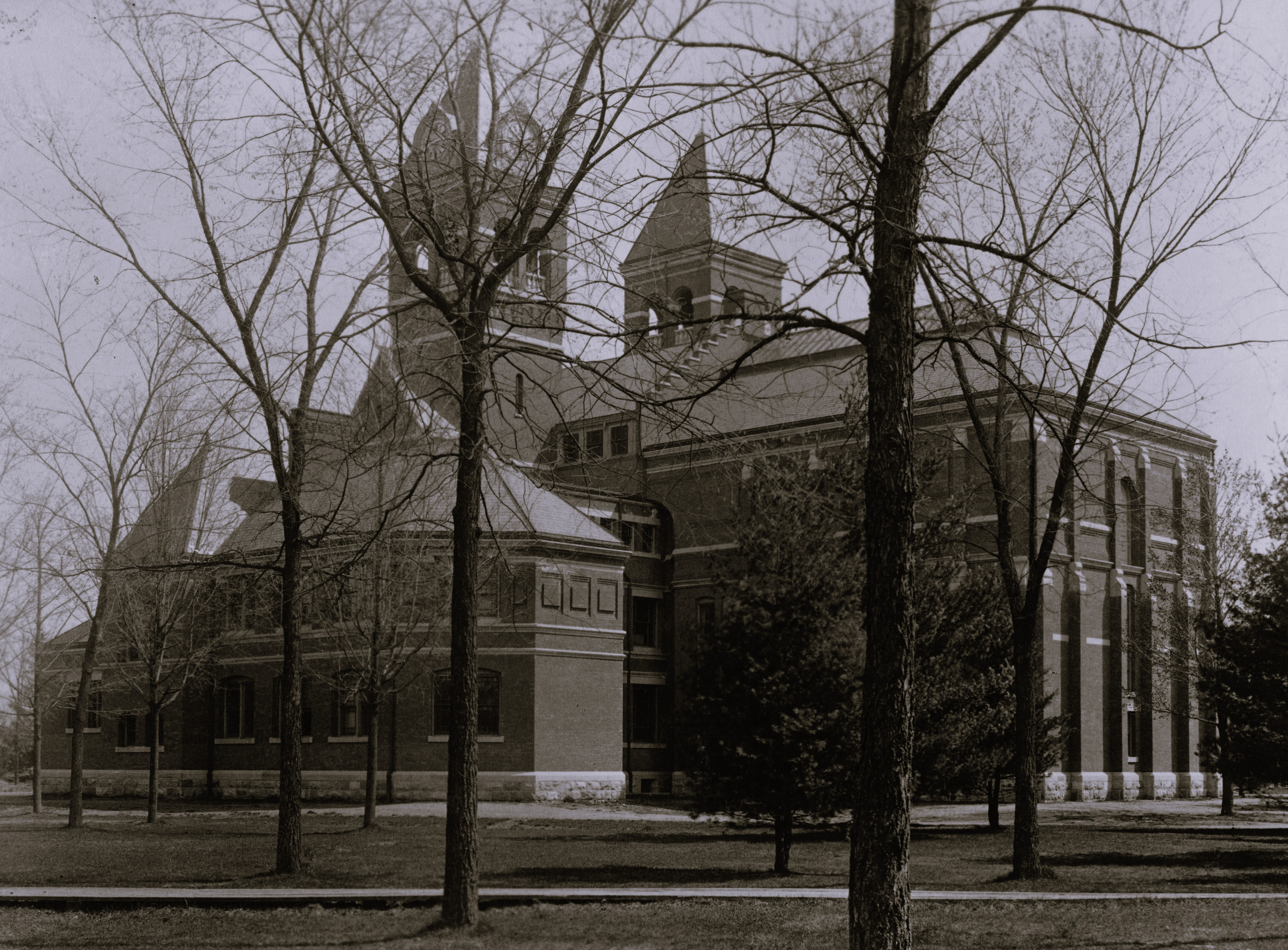
The Old Library (1881–1918), designed by Henry Van Brunt, had an addition built to the south in 1898. The portion constructed in 1883 was torn down in 1918.

The Central Campus today, however, bears little resemblance to its 19th-century appearance, as most of its original structures were demolished and rebuilt in the early 20th century. The rebuilt structures are primarily the work of Albert Kahn, who served as the university's supervising architect during that period. In 1909, Regent William L. Clements became chairman of the Building and Grounds Committee, leading to Albert Kahn's growing influence in the university's architectural development. Clements, impressed by Kahn's work on his industrial projects and residence in Bay City, awarded him multiple university commissions and appointed him as the university's supervising architect. The West Engineering Hall (1910), Natural Science Building (1915), and General Library (1920) were all designed by Kahn. During a period of limited construction funding, these structures exhibited a simple design with minimal ornamentation. However, Kahn's Hill Auditorium (1913), adequately funded by Regent Arthur Hill, features extensive Sullivanesque ornamentation and excellent acoustic design, which was rare for that period.

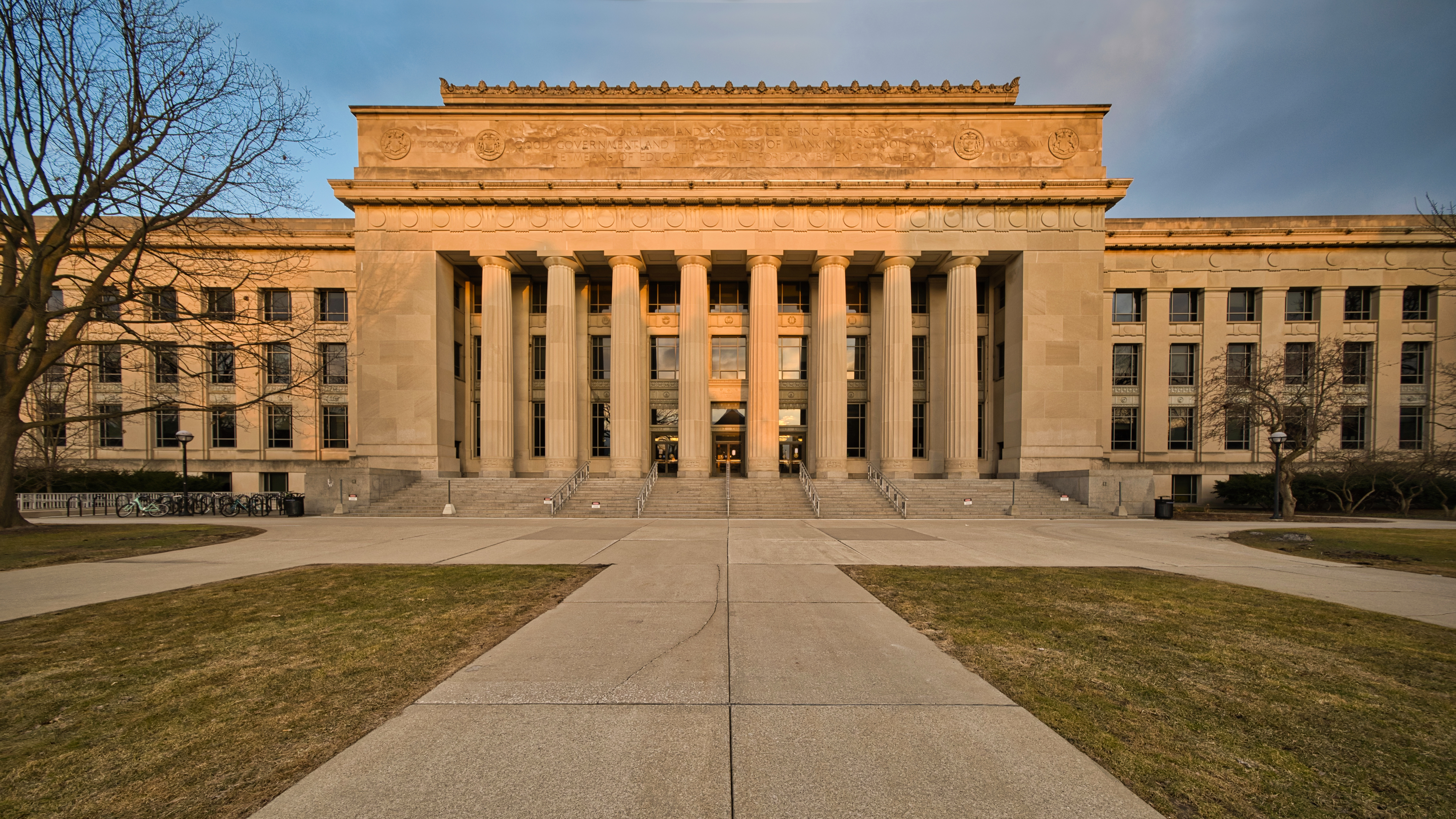
James Burrill Angell Hall (1924) on Central Campus serves as a major academic building for the College of Literature, Science, and the Arts.

Beginning in 1920, the university received greater funding for construction projects, thanks to president Burton's fiscal persuasiveness with the legislature, propelled by a prosperous economy. This allowed campus buildings to be constructed in a grand manner. Kahn's Italian Renaissance Clements Library (1923), Classical Greek Angell Hall (1924), and Art Deco Burton Memorial Tower (1936) all feature unusual and costly materials and are considered some of his most elegant university buildings. The last of Kahn's university commissions was the Ruthven Museums Building (1928), designed in the Renaissance style.

Other architects who contributed to the Central Campus include Spier & Rohns, who designed Newberry Hall (1888), Tappan Hall (1894), and the West Medical Building (1904); Smith, Hinchman and Grylls, the architects of the Chemistry Building (1910) and East Engineering Building; and Perkins, Fellows and Hamilton, who designed University High School (1924). The Michigan Union (1919) and Michigan League (1929), completed by alumni Irving Kane Pond and Allen Bartlit Pond, house the university's various student organizations. Alumni Memorial Hall, funded by contributions from alumni in memory of the university's Civil War dead, was completed by Donaldson and Meier. It was designated as the University Museum of Art in 1946. Tony Rosenthal created the monumental cube Endover in 1968.

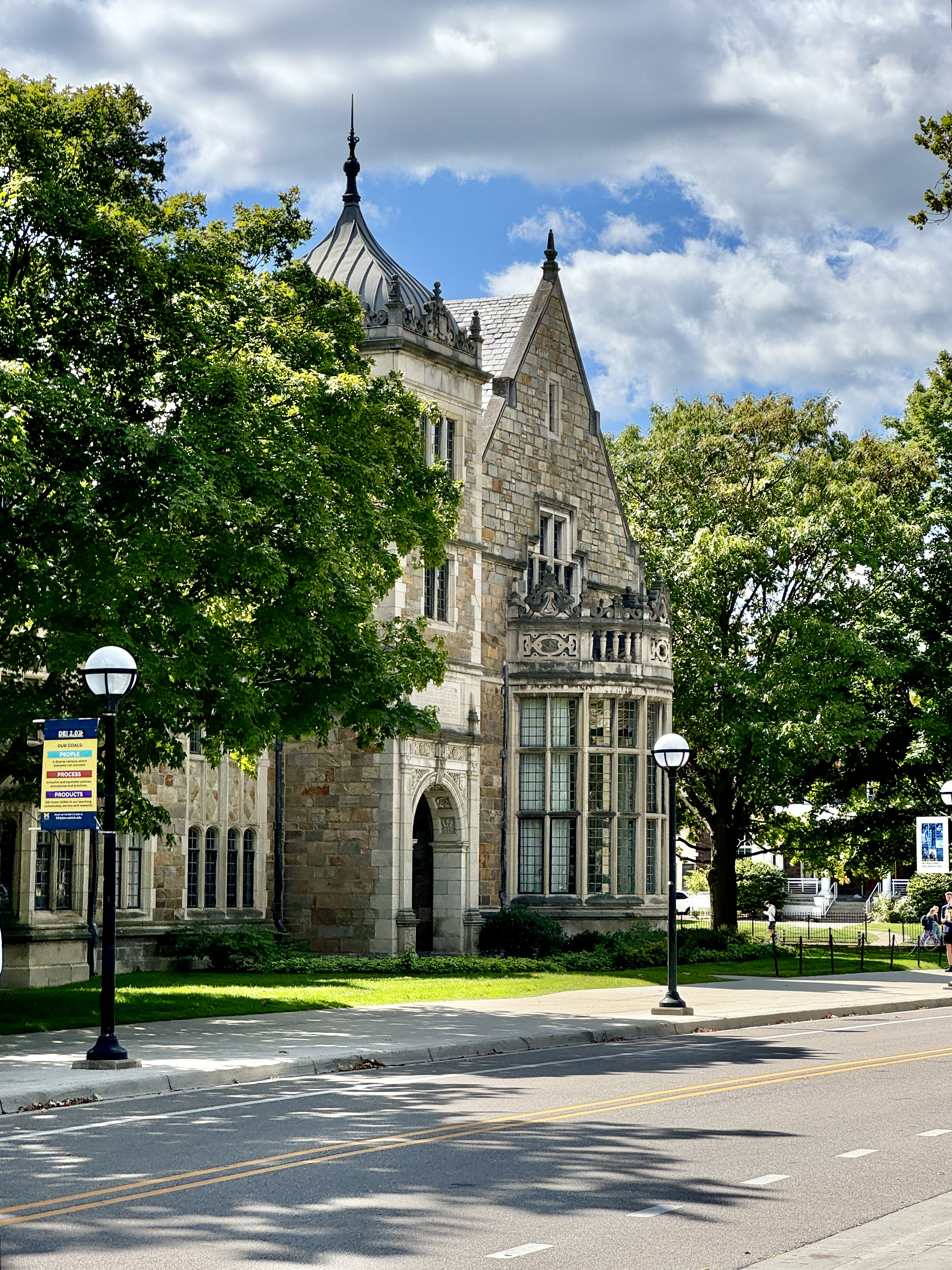
Lawyers Club (1924), Law Quadrangle

The area just south of The Diag is predominantly Gothic in character, contrasting with the classical designs prevalent in many of Kahn's university buildings. The Martha Cook Building (1915), completed by York and Sawyer, Samuel Parsons, and George A. Fuller in 1915, draws inspiration from England's Knole House and Aston Hall. It was one of the university's early women's residences. York and Sawyer also designed the Law Quadrangle, which features a flagstone courtyard by landscape architect Jacob Van Heiningan. The Lawyers' Club, part of the quadrangle, includes a clubhouse, dining hall, and dormitory, modeled after English clubs with an Elizabethan-style lounge and a dining hall inspired by the chapels of Eaton. The Law Library's main reading room showcases craftsmanship from the Rockefeller Church of New York. Hutchins Hall, designed by alumnus James Baird, is named after Harry Burns Hutchins, the fourth president of the university. Following its completion, nearby buildings like the School of Education Building, by Malcomson and Higginbotham, and Emil Lorch's Architecture and Design Building adopted Gothic elements reflecting the style of the Law Quadrangle and Martha Cook Residence.

The Central Campus is the location of the College of Literature, Science and the Arts. Most of the graduate and professional schools, including the Law School, Ross School of Business, Gerald R. Ford School of Public Policy, and the School of Dentistry, are on Central Campus. Two main libraries, Hatcher Graduate Library and Shapiro Undergraduate Library, as well as the university's many museums, are also on Central Campus.

=== North Campus ===
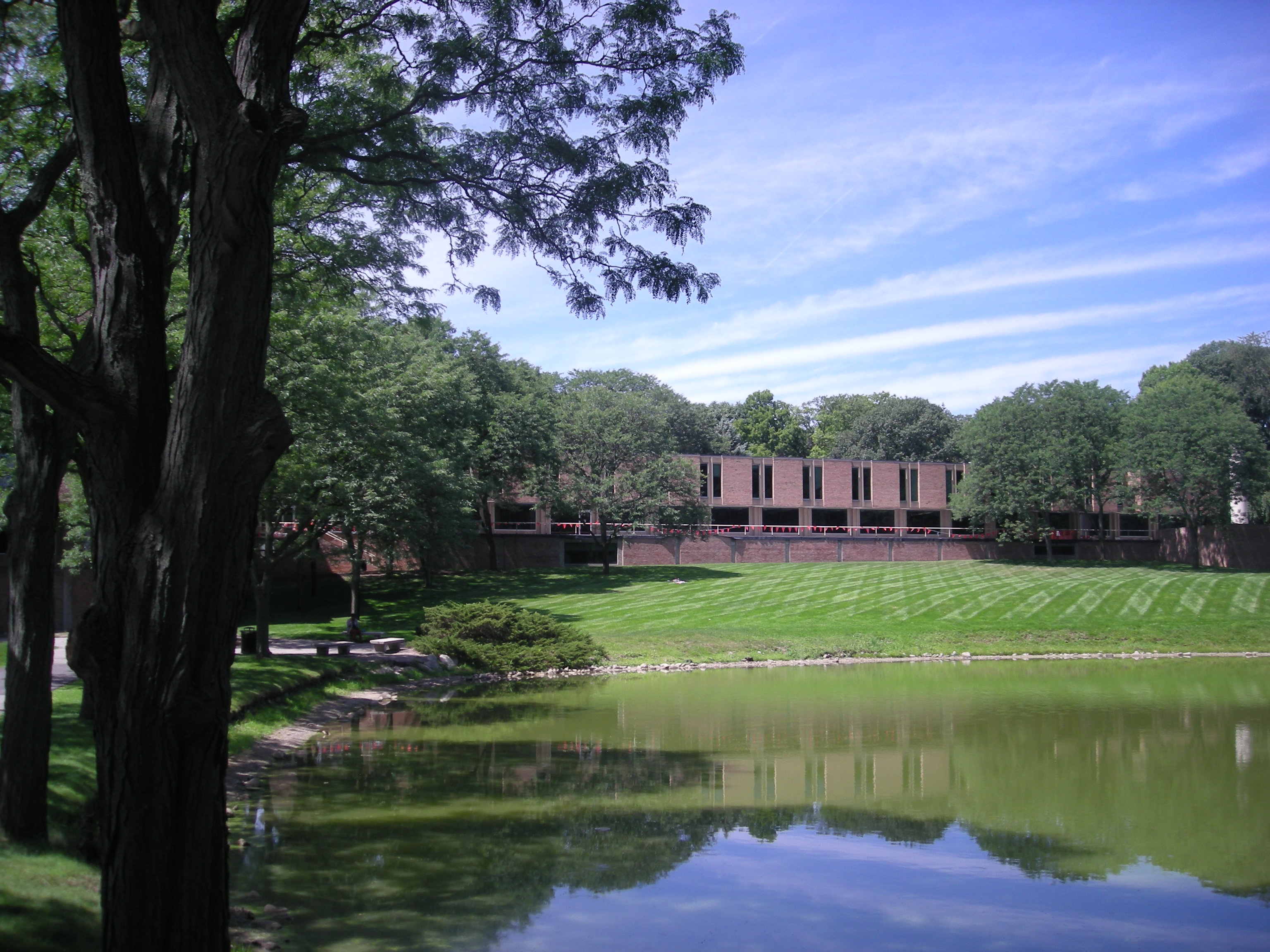
Earl V. Moore Building (1964), designed by Eero Saarinen

The North Campus area built independently from the city on a large plot of farmland—approximately 800 acres (3.2 km^{2})—that the university bought in 1952. Architect Eero Saarinen devised the early master plan for the North Campus area and designed several of its buildings in the 1950s, including the Earl V. Moore School of Music Building. The university's largest residence hall, Bursley Hall, is in the North Campus area. The North Campus Diag features a bell tower called Lurie Tower, which contains a grand carillon.

The North Campus houses the College of Engineering, the School of Music, Theatre & Dance, the Stamps School of Art & Design, the Taubman College of Architecture and Urban Planning, and an annex of the School of Information. The campus area is served by Duderstadt Center, which houses the Art, Architecture and Engineering Library. Duderstadt Center also contains multiple computer labs, video editing studios, electronic music studios, an audio studio, a video studio, multimedia workspaces, and a 3D virtual reality room. Other libraries located on North Campus include the Gerald R. Ford Presidential Library and the Bentley Historical Library.

=== Ross Athletic Campus ===
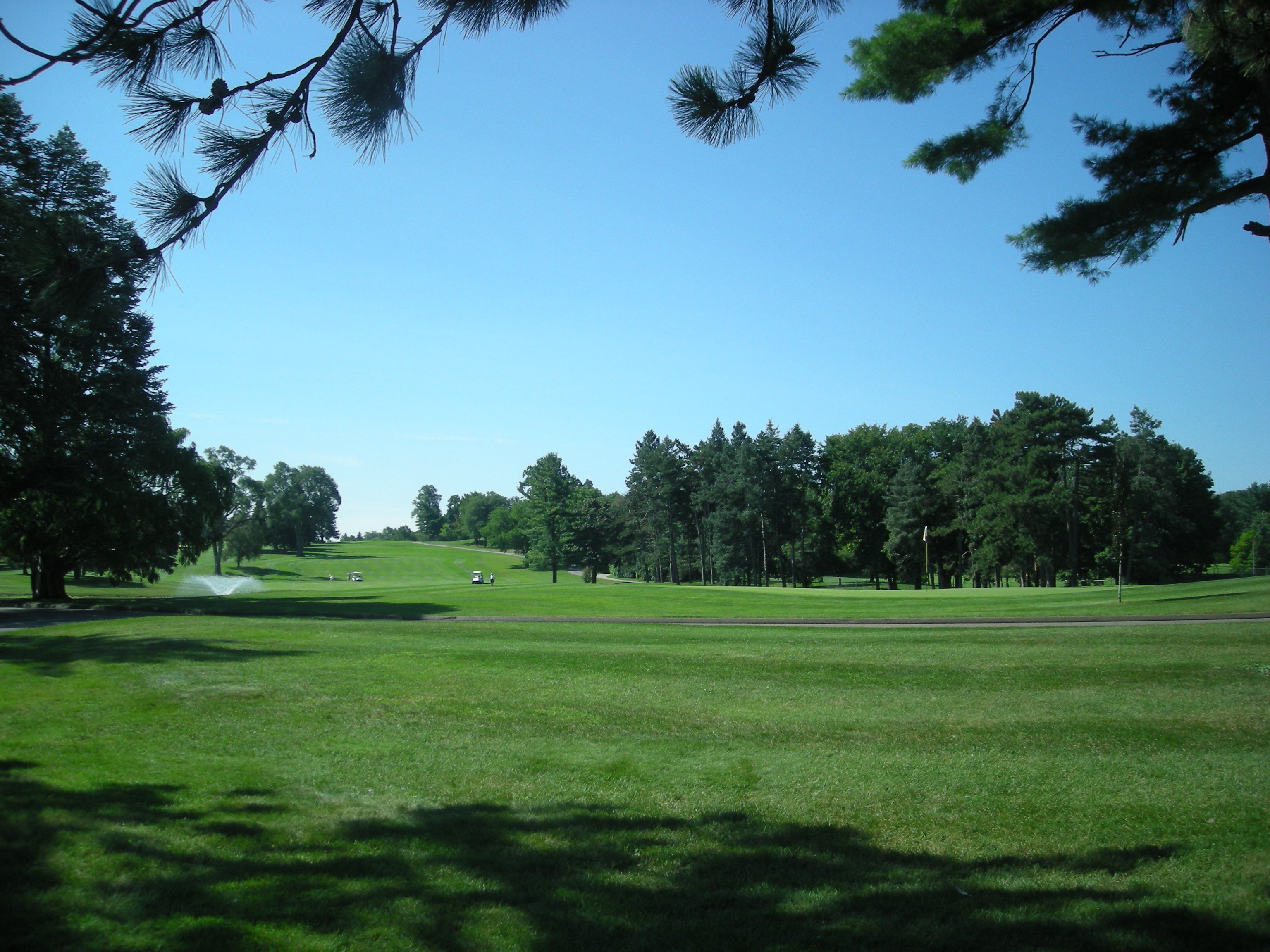
The University of Michigan Golf Course was designed by Scottish golf course architect Alister MacKenzie and opened in 1931.

Ross Athletic Campus is the site for the university's athletic programs, including major sports facilities such as Michigan Stadium, Crisler Center, and Yost Ice Arena. The campus area is also the site of the Buhr library storage facility, Revelli Hall, home of the Michigan Marching Band, the Institute for Continuing Legal Education, and the Student Theatre Arts Complex, which provides shop and rehearsal space for student theatre groups. The university's departments of public safety and transportation services offices are located on Ross Athletic Campus.

The University of Michigan Golf Course is located south of Michigan Stadium. It was designed in the late 1920s by Alister MacKenzie, the designer of Augusta National Golf Club in Augusta, Georgia, home of the Masters Tournament.

=== Residential halls ===
The University of Michigan's residential system can accommodate approximately 10,000 students. The residence halls are located in three distinct geographic areas on campus: the Central Campus area, The Hill (between the Central Campus area and the main medical campus) and the North Campus area. The largest residence hall has a capacity of 1,270 students, while the smallest accommodates 25 residents.

Residential halls at the University of Michigan

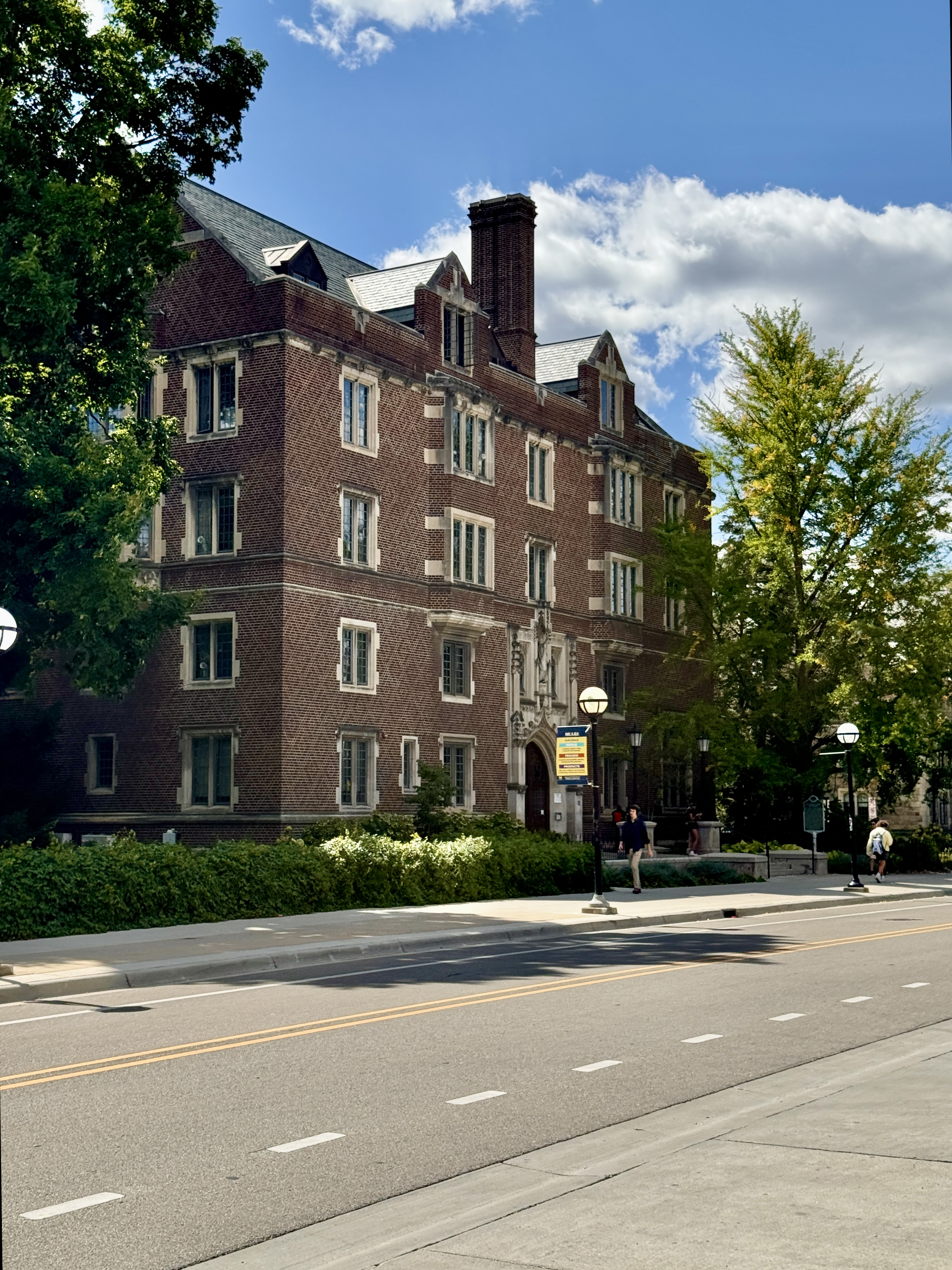
Martha Cook Residence Hall

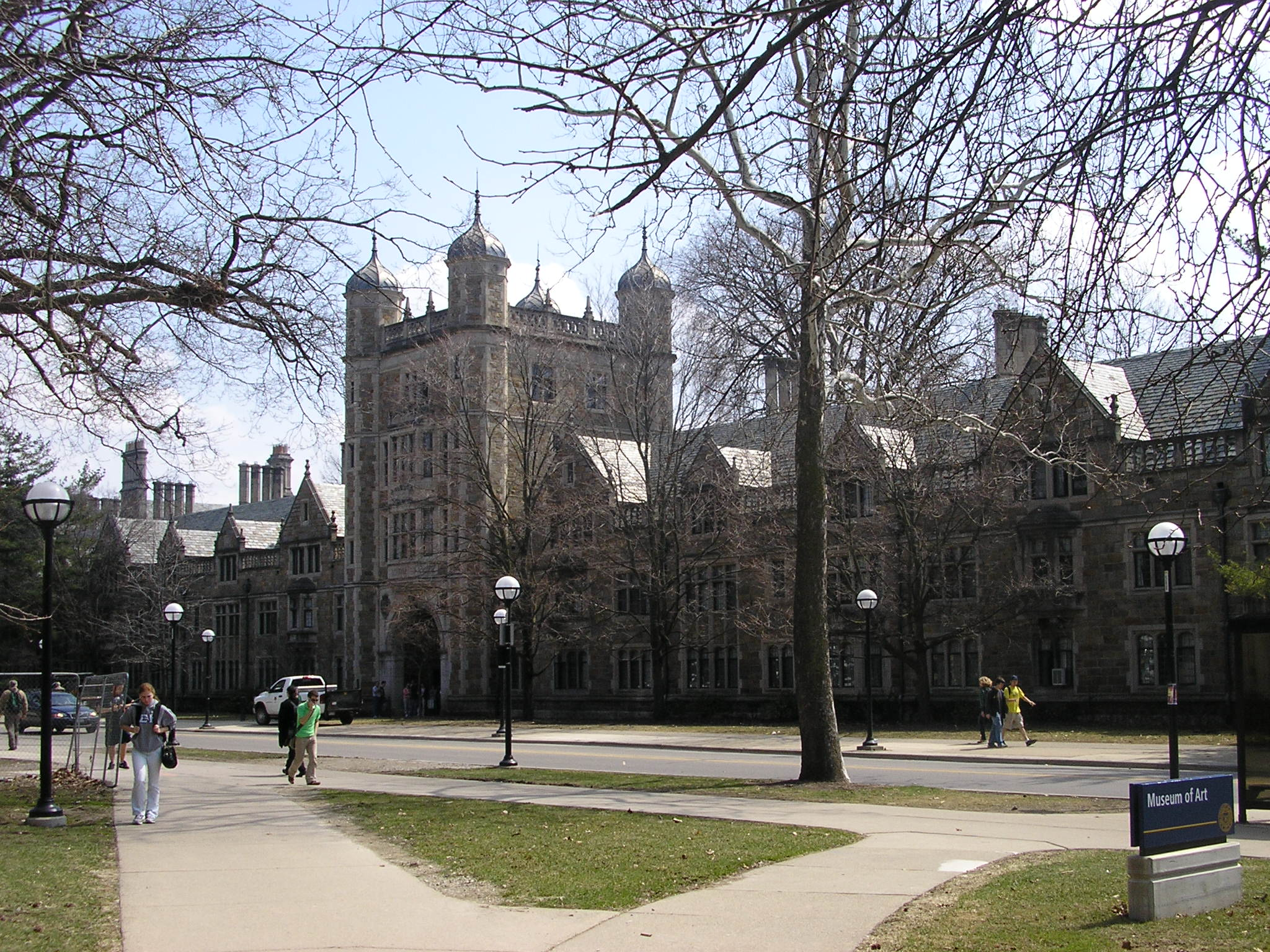
Law Quadrangle

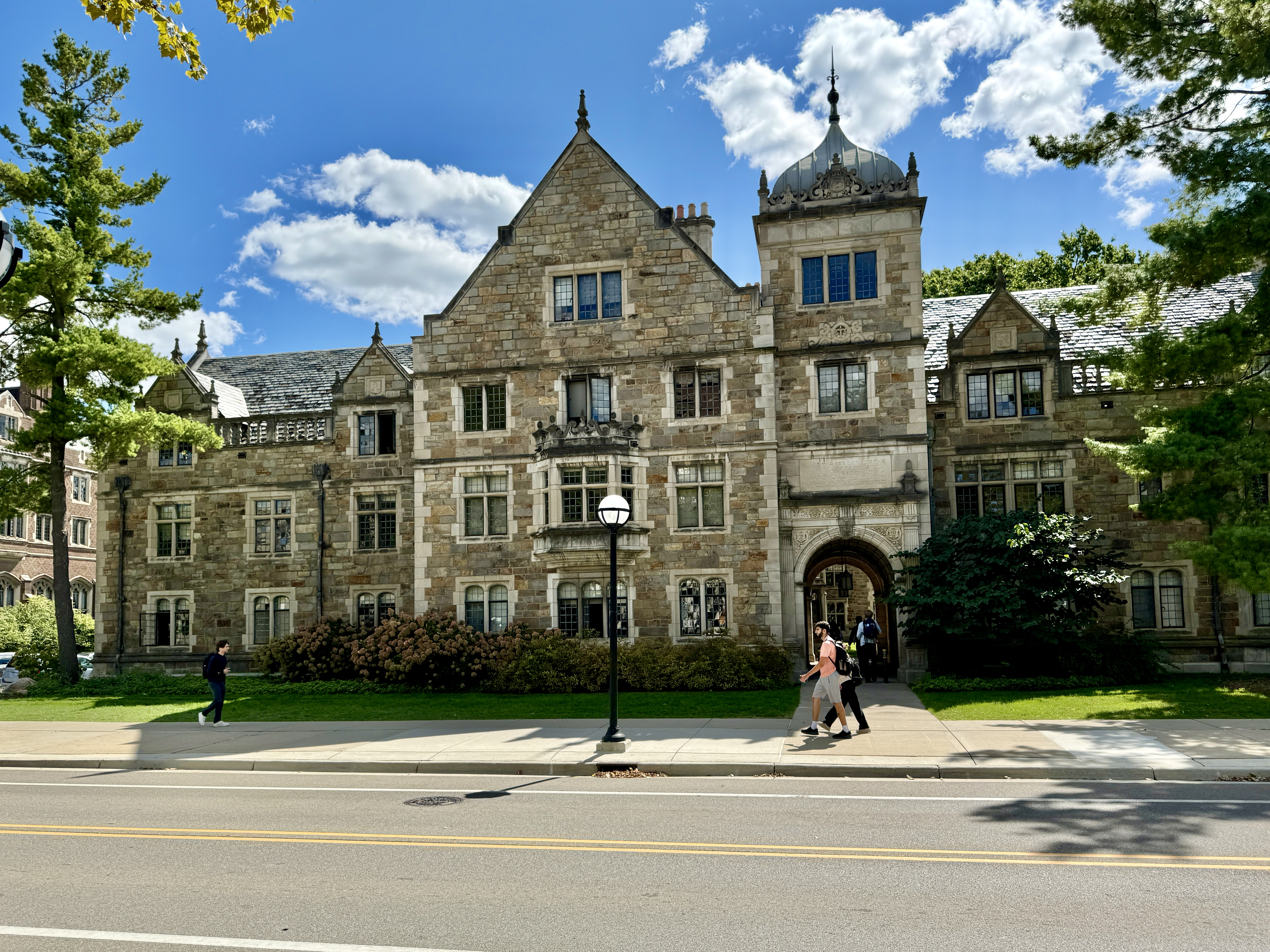
John P. Cook Residence Hall

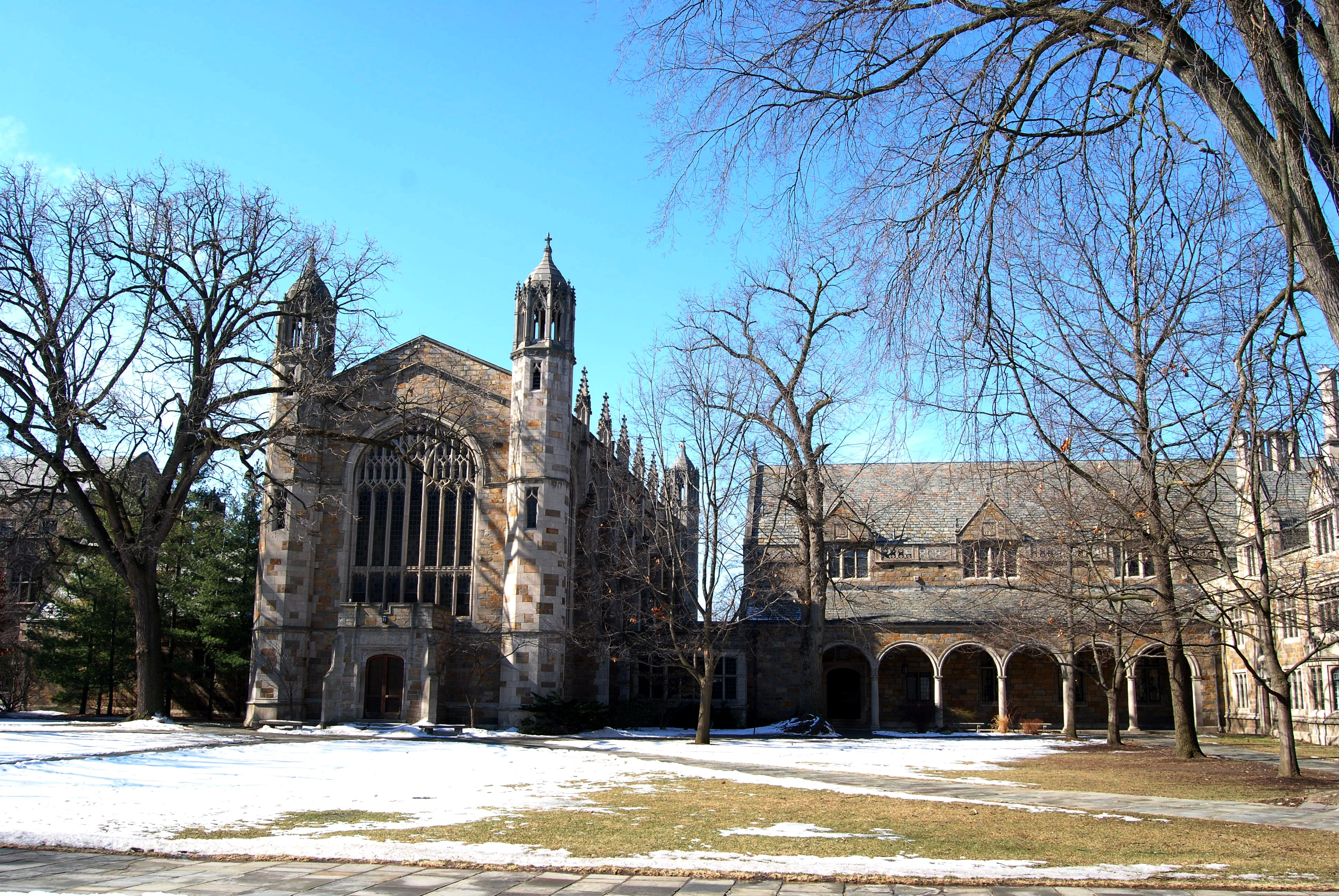
Munger Residences (Lawyers' Club)

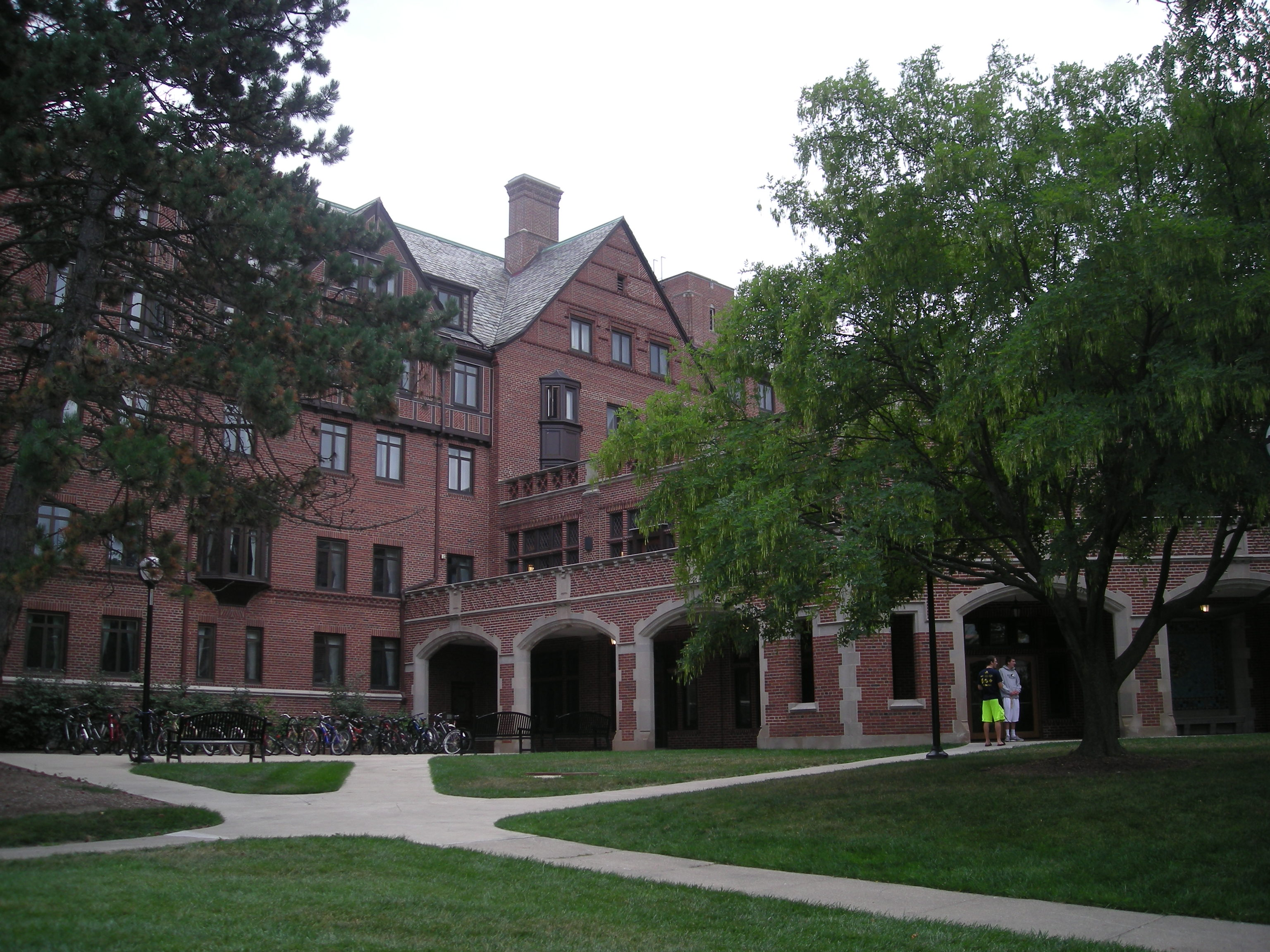
Stockwell Residence Hall

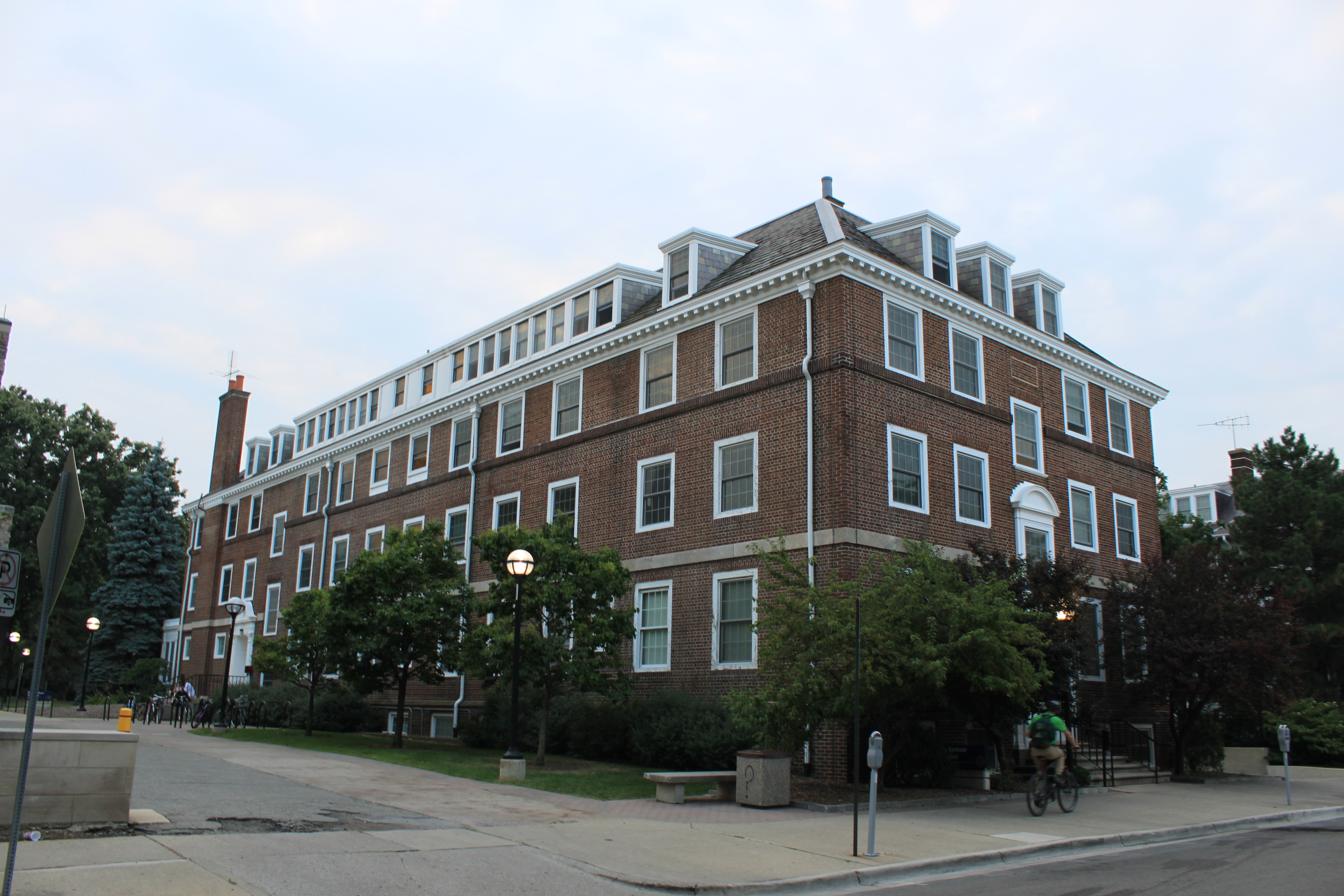
Betsy Barbour House

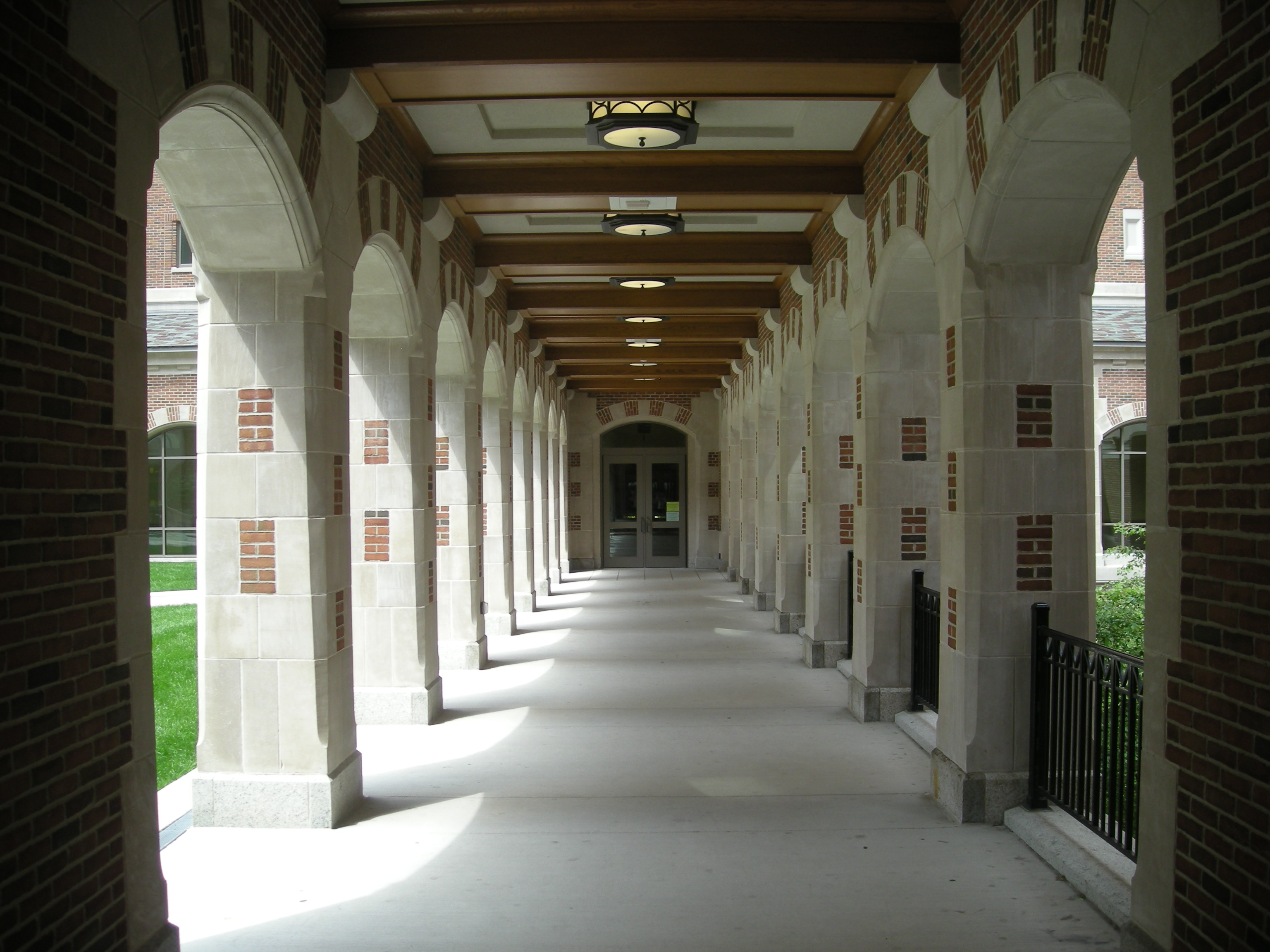
North Quadrangle

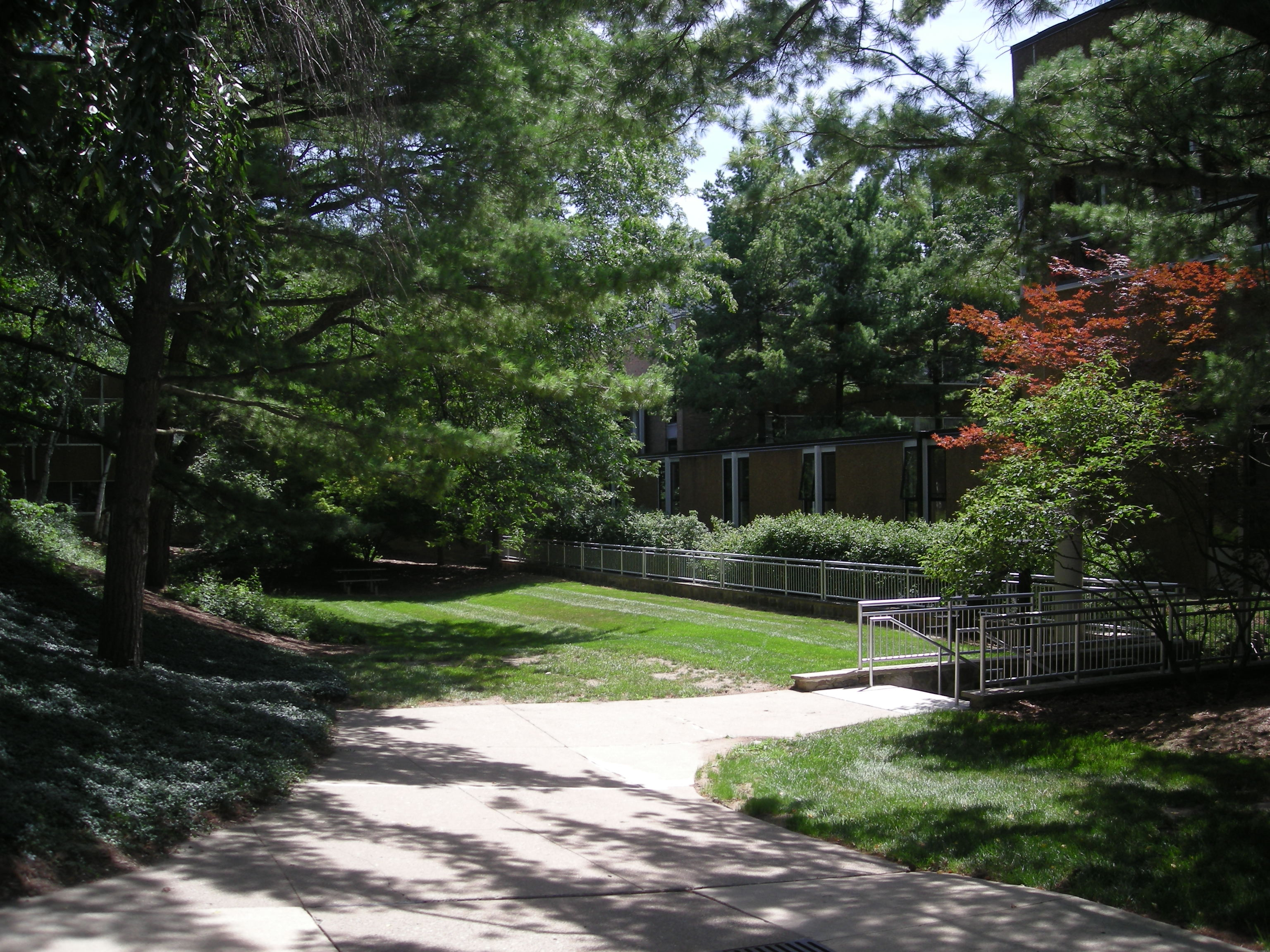
Joseph A. and Marguerite K. Bursley Hall

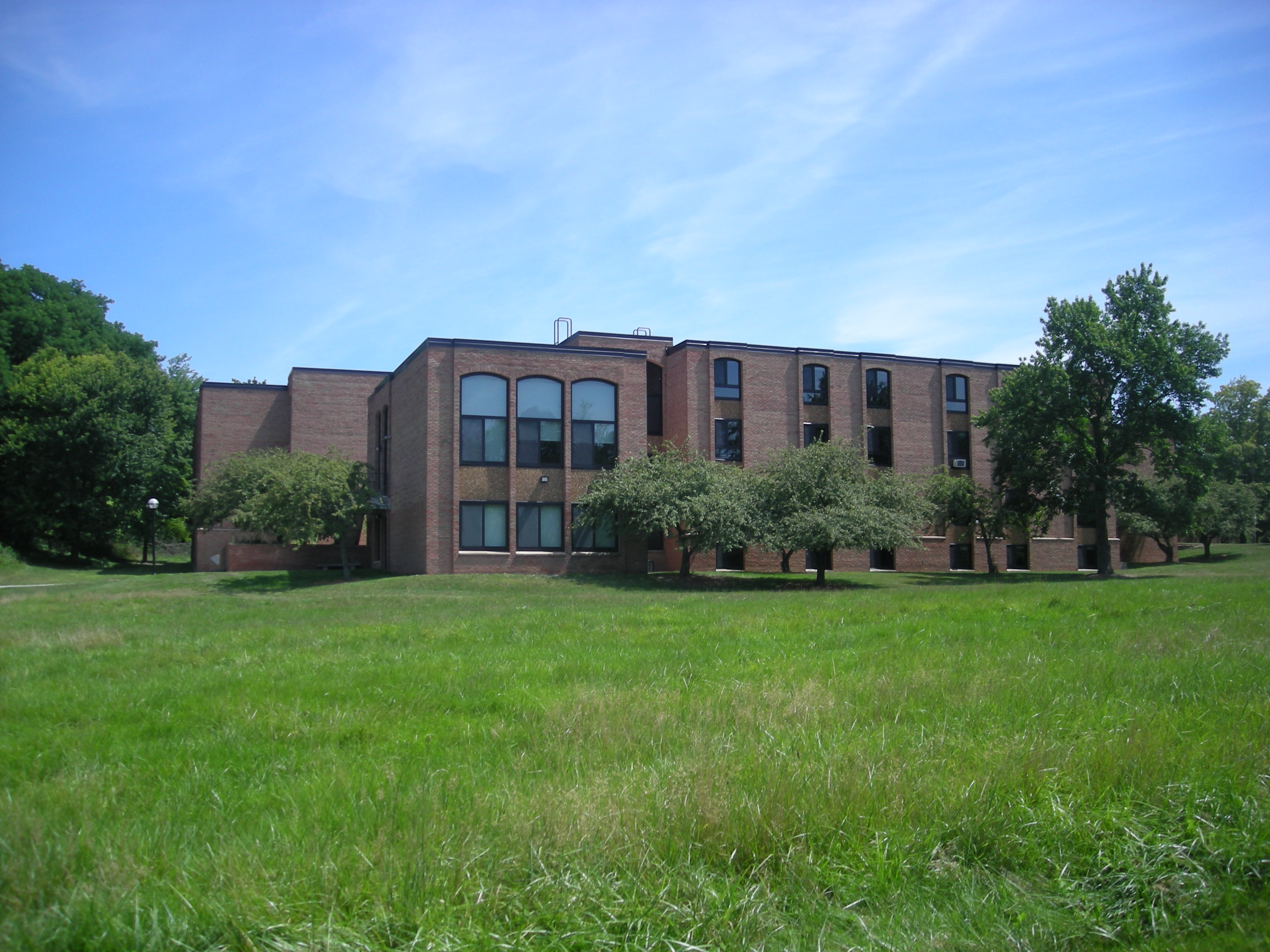
Vera Baits Houses

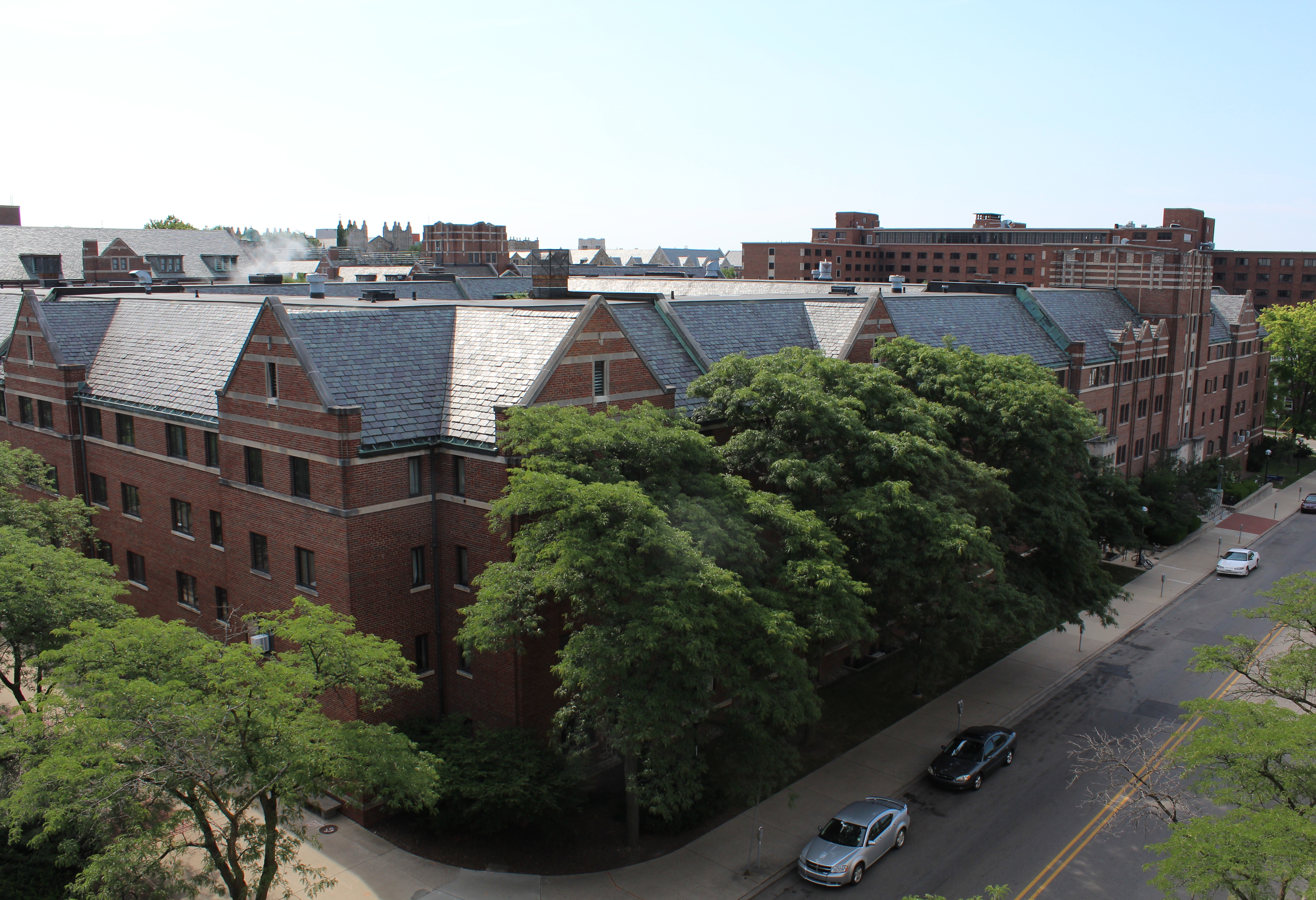
West Quandrangle

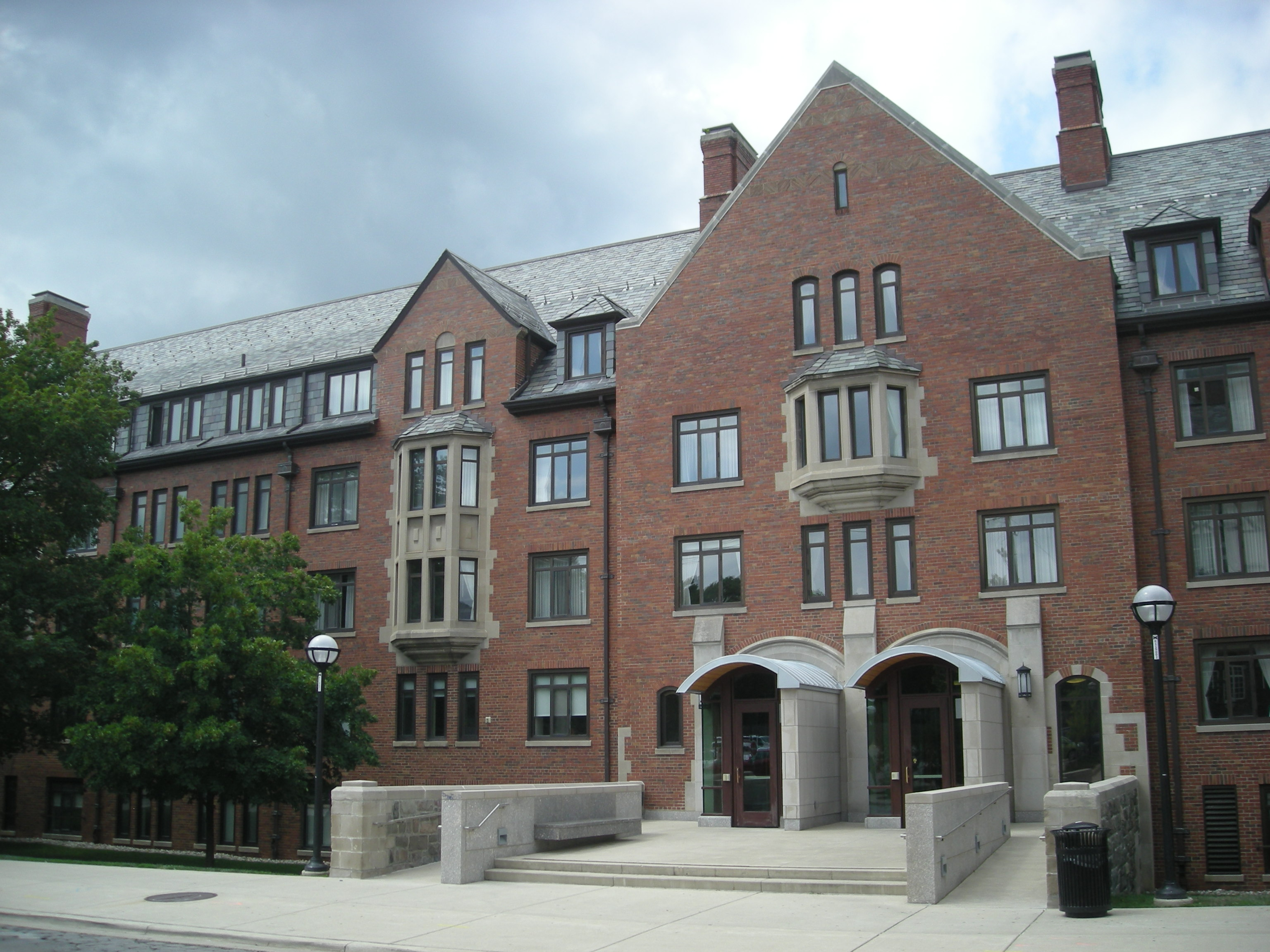
Mosher-Jordan Hall

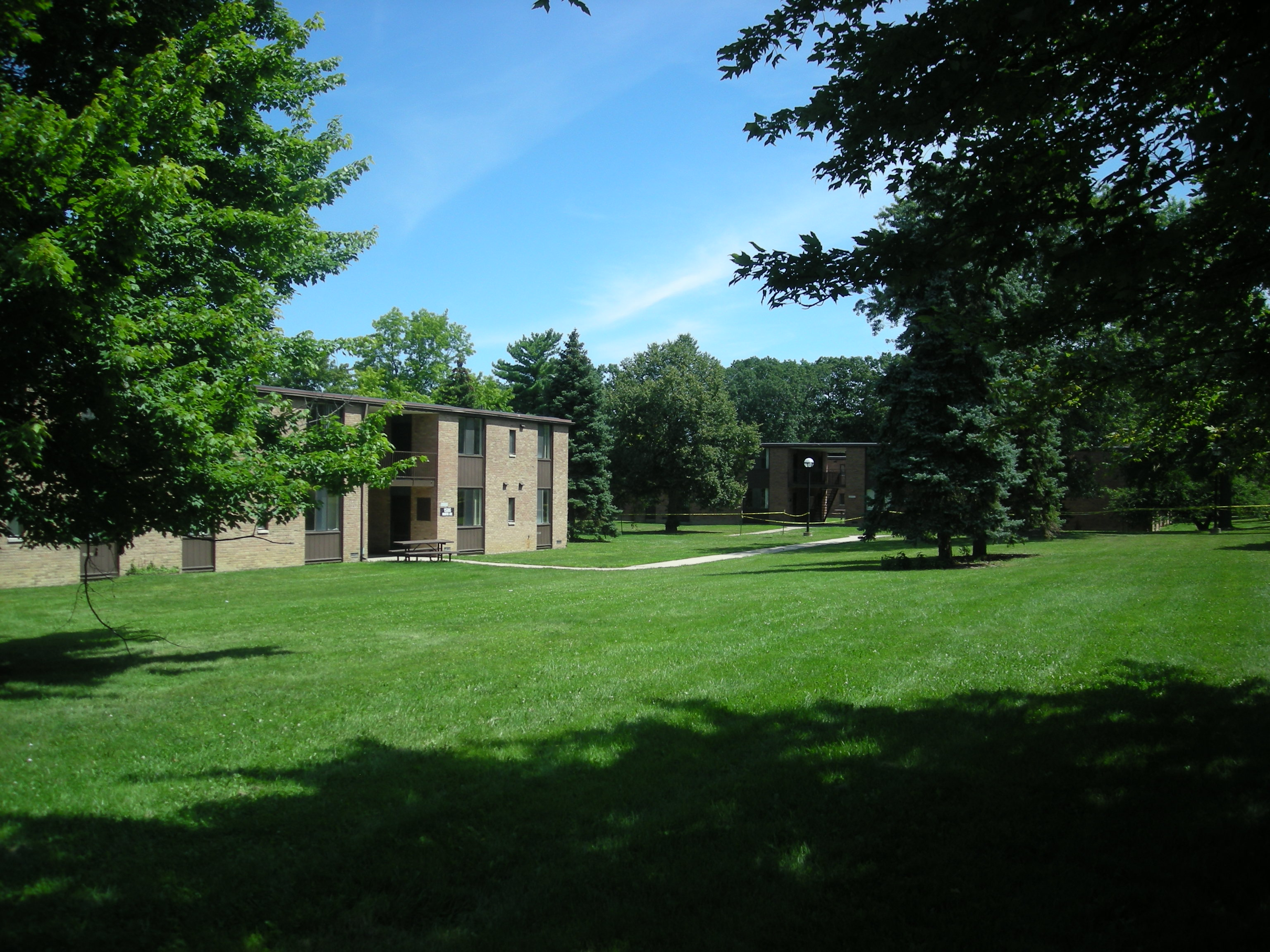
Northwood Apartments

== Organization and administration ==
=== Governance ===
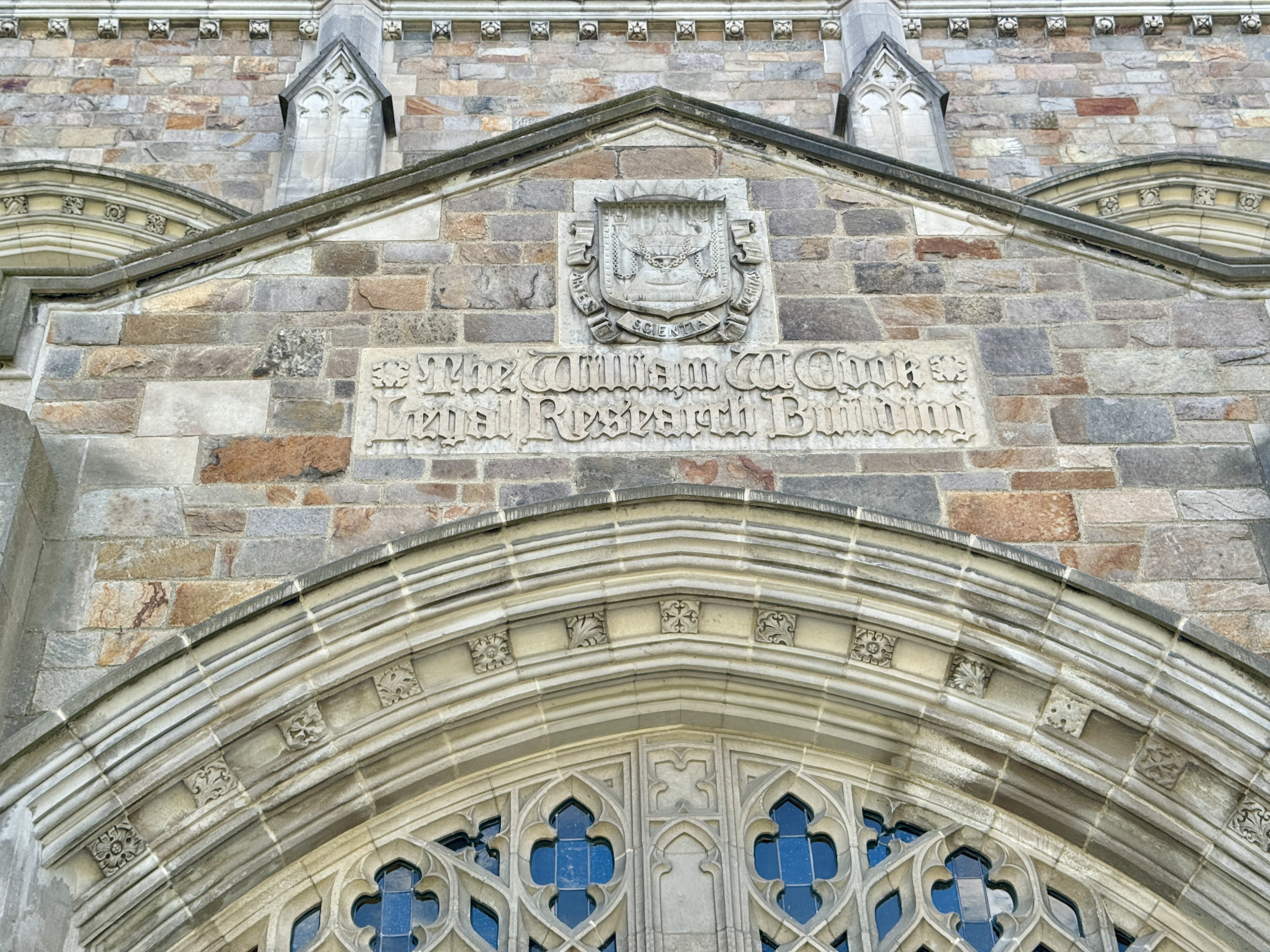
William W. Cook Legal Research Building at the Law School, showing the emblem of the University of Michigan

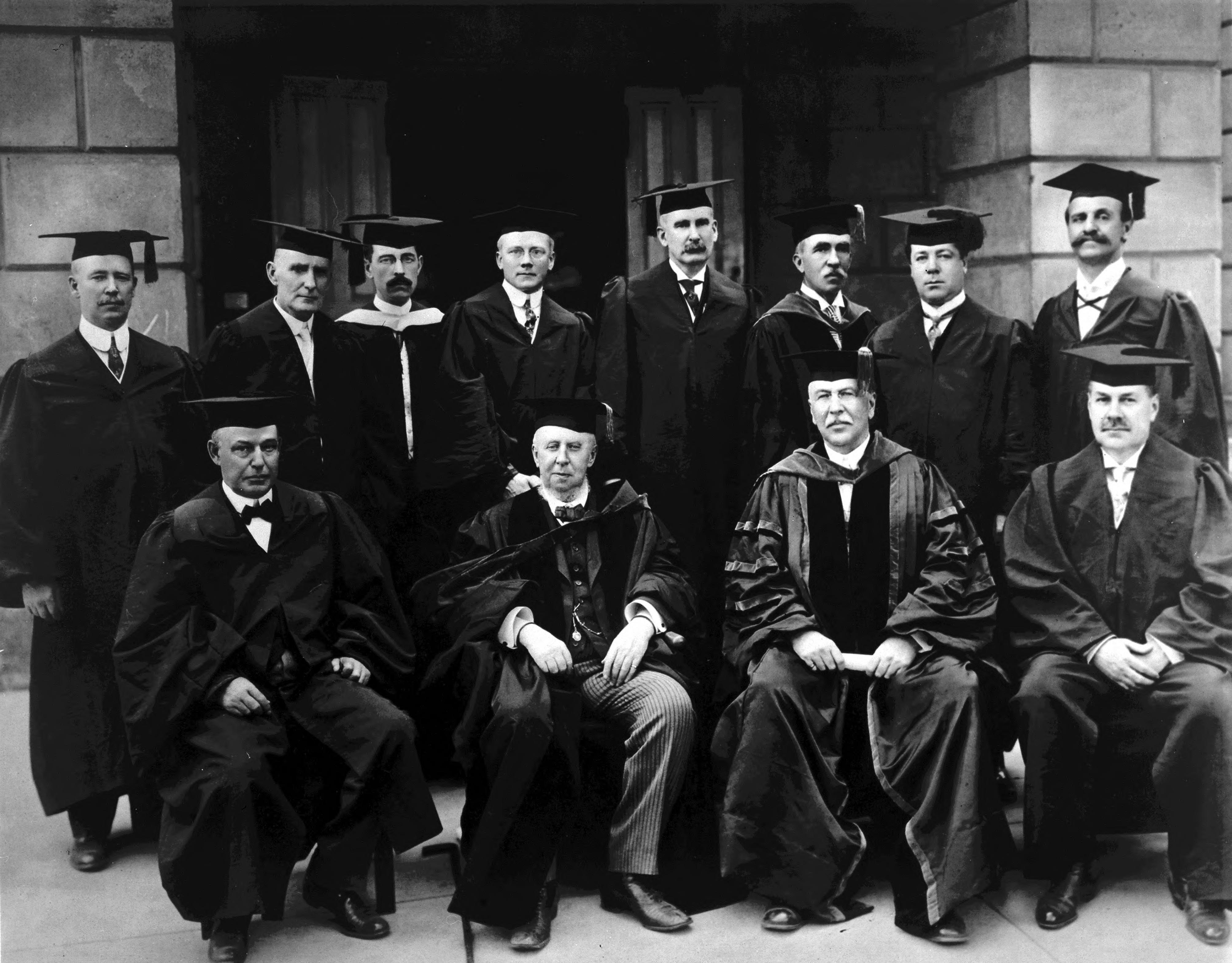
Photograph of Michigan University Regents 75th Anniversary Celebration on June 27, 1912. Standing L-R: Frank B. Leland, John H. Grant, Shirley W. Smith, Harry O. Bulkey, William L. Clements, Lucius Lee Hubbard, Benjamin Hanchett, Junius E. Beal Seated L-R: Luther L. Wright, James B. Angell, Harry B. Hutchins, Walter M. Sawyer

The University of Michigan is governed by the Board of Regents, established by the Organic Act of March 18, 1837. It consists of eight members, elected at large in biennial state elections for overlapping eight-year terms. Before the Office of President was established in 1850, the University of Michigan was directly managed by the appointed regents, with a rotating group of professors responsible for carrying out day-to-day administrative duties. The Constitution of the State of Michigan of 1850 restructured the university's administration. It established the Office of the President and transitioned the Board of Regents to an elected body. The state constitution granted the Board of Regents the power to appoint a non-voting presiding president to lead their meetings, effectively elevating the board to the level of a constitutional corporation independent of the state administration and making the University of Michigan the first public institution of higher education in the country so organized.

The Board of Regents delegates its power to the university president who serves as the chief executive officer responsible for managing the day-to-day operations of the university, that is, the main campus in Ann Arbor. The president retains authority over the branch campuses in Dearborn and Flint but is not directly involved in their day-to-day management. Instead, two separate chancellors are appointed by the president to serve as chief executive officers overseeing each branch campus. All presidents are appointed by the Board of Regents to serve five-year terms, at the board's discretion, and there are no term limits for university presidents. The board has the authority to either terminate the president's tenure or extend it for an additional term.

The presidency of the University of Michigan is currently vacant, with Domenico Grasso (PhD '87), former chancellor of the Dearborn campus, serving as the interim president. Following the immediate resignation of Santa Ono, the university's former president, the board of regents named Grasso as the university's interim president on May 8, 2025. He will continue serving as interim president through November 30, 2026; president-elect C. Cybele Raver, appointed as the university's 17th president, will take office on December 1, 2026. Laurie McCauley has been serving as the 17th and current provost of the university since May 2022, and she was recommended by former president Santa Ono to serve a full term through June 30, 2027.

The President's House, located at 815 South University Avenue on the Ann Arbor campus, is the official residence and office of the University President. Constructed in 1840, the three-story Italianate President's House is the oldest surviving building on the Ann Arbor campus and a University of Michigan Central Campus Historic District contributing property.

==== Student government ====
The Central Student Government, housed in the Michigan Union, is the university's student government. As a 501(c)(3) independent organization, it represents students from all colleges and schools, manages student funds on campus, and has representatives from each academic unit. The Central Student Government is separate from the University of Michigan administration.

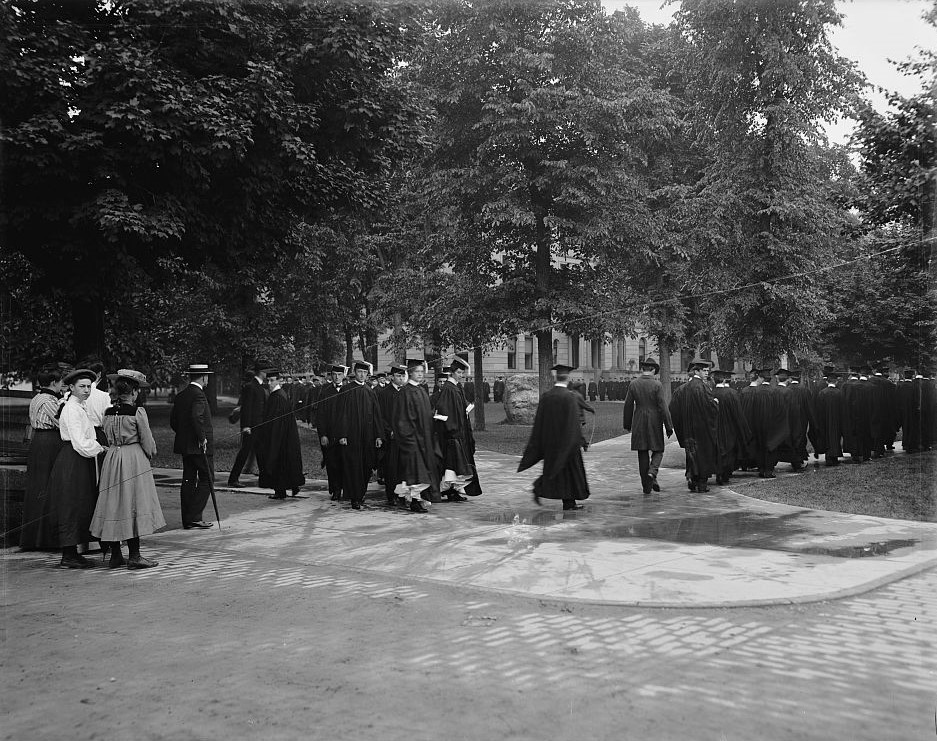
Photograph of the senior parade on commencement day, circa 1903

Over the years, the Central Student Government has led voter registration drives, changed a football seating policy, and created a Student Advisory Council for Ann Arbor city affairs. A longstanding goal of the Central Student Government has been to create a student-designated seat on the Board of Regents. In 2000 and 2002, students Nick Waun, Scott Trudeau, Matt Petering, and Susan Fawcett ran for the Board of Regents on the statewide ballot as third-party nominees, though none were successful. A 1998 poll by the State of Michigan concluded that a majority of voters would approve adding a student regent position if put to a vote. However, amending the composition of the Board of Regents would require a constitutional amendment in Michigan.

In addition to the Central Student Government, each college and school at the University of Michigan has its own independent student governance body. Undergraduate students in the College of Literature, Science, and the Arts are represented by the LS&A Student Government. Engineering Student Government manages undergraduate student government affairs for the College of Engineering. Graduate students enrolled in the Rackham Graduate School are represented by the Rackham Student Government, and law students are represented by the Law School Student Senate as is each other college with its own respective government. In addition, the students who live in the residence halls are represented by the University of Michigan Residence Halls Association, which contains the third most constituents after Central Student Government and LS&A Student Government.

=== Finances ===
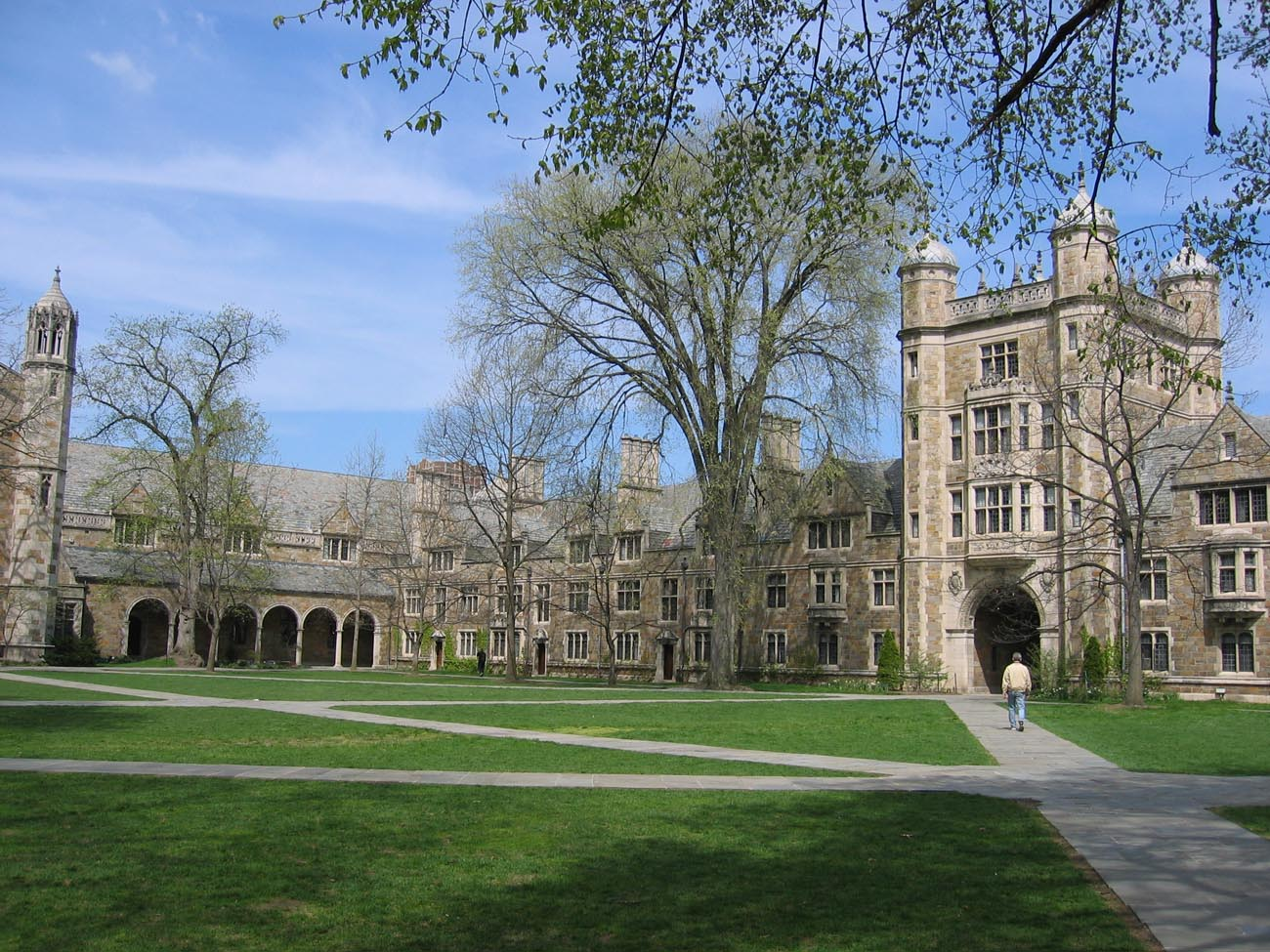
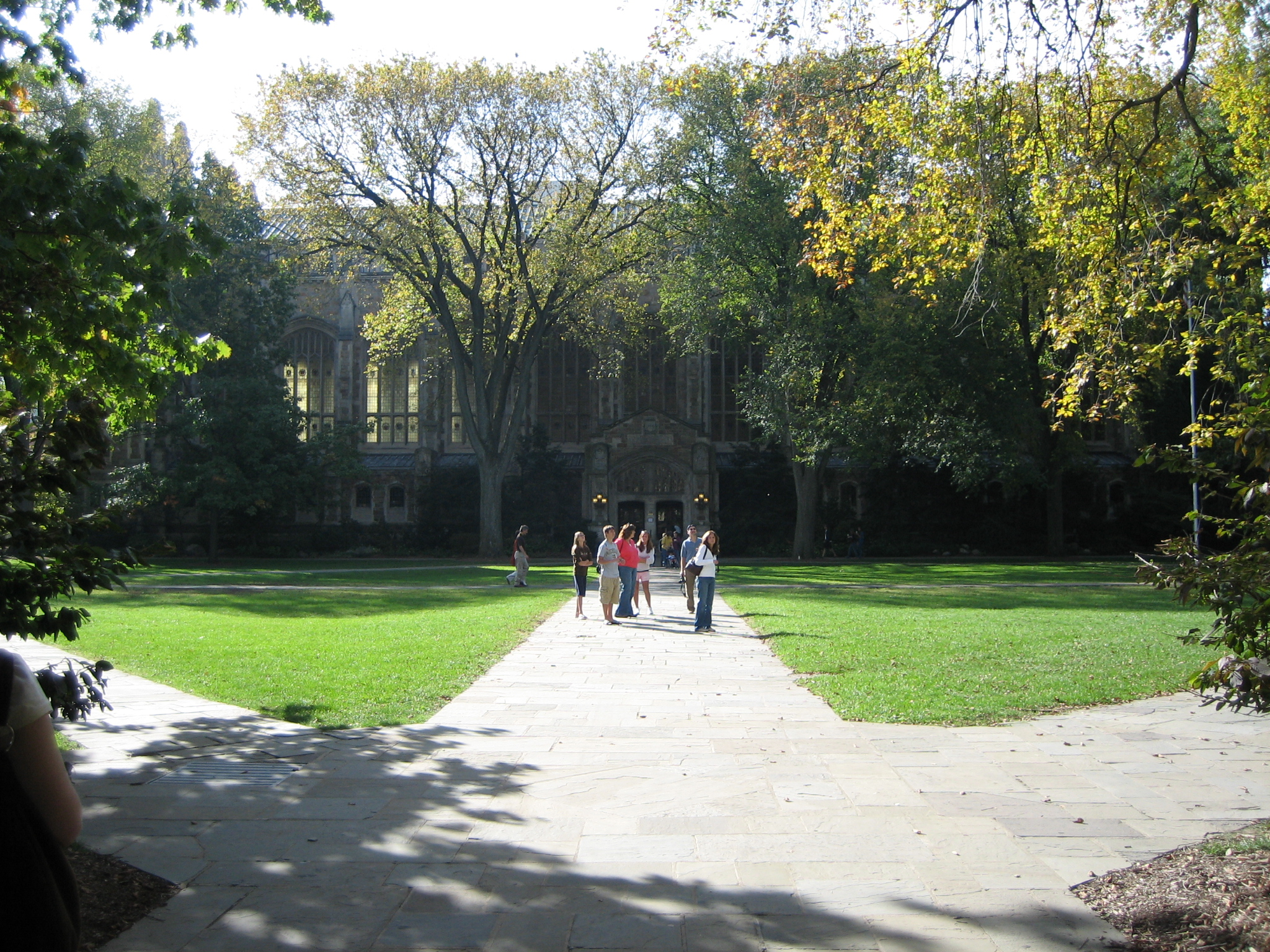
The William W. Cook Legal Research Library and other buildings comprising the Law Quadrangle were built during 1923–33 and then donated to the university by William Wilson Cook. It was the university's most significant private gift at the time.

In the fiscal year 2022–23, the State of Michigan spent $333 million on the university, which represents 3.03% of its total operating revenues of $11 billion. The university is the second-largest recipient of state appropriations for higher education in Michigan for 2022-23, trailing Michigan State University ($372 million). The Office of Budget and Planning reports that Michigan Medicine's auxiliary activities are the largest funding source, contributing $6.05 billion to the Auxiliary Funds, which accounts for 55.1% of the total operating budget. Student tuition and fees contributed $1.95 billion to the General Fund, accounting for 11% of the total budget. Research grants and contracts from the U.S. federal government contributed $1.15 billion to the Expendable Restricted Funds, accounting for 10.4% of the total budget.

The university's current (FY 2022–23) operating budget has four major sources of funding:

- General Fund money, which accounts for 25.4% of the operating budget, is derived from various sources: student tuition and fees ($1.95 billion or 75.2%), state support ($333 million or 12.8%), sponsored research ($301 million or 11.6%), and other revenue ($8 million or 0.3%). It covers the costs of teaching, student services, facilities, and administrative support. The state's annual contribution to the school's operating budget was 3.03% in 2023 and does not cover intercollegiate athletics, housing, or Michigan Medicine.
- Auxiliary Funds, which account for 58.2% of the operating budget, are sourced from self-supporting units and do not receive taxpayer or tuition support. These include Michigan Medicine ($6.16 billion), intercollegiate athletics ($186 million), student housing ($160 million), and student publications.
- Expendable Restricted Funds, which account for 14.2% of the operating budget, are from providers who designate how their money is spent. Funding comes from research grants and contracts, endowment payout ($305 million), and private gifts ($157 million). It pays for scholarships and fellowships; salaries, benefits and research support for some faculty; and research, programs and academic centers.
- Designated Funds, which account for 2.2% of the operating budget, come from fees charged for and spent on experiential learning, programs, conferences, performance venues, and executive and continuing education.

==== Endowment ====
The university's financial endowment, known as the "University Endowment Fund", comprises over 12,400 individual funds. Each fund must be spent according to the donor's specifications. Approximately 28% of the total endowment is allocated to support academic programs, while 22% is designated for student scholarships and fellowships. Approximately 19% of the endowment was allocated to Michigan Medicine and can only be used to support research, patient care, or other purposes specified by donors.

As of 2023, the university's endowment, valued at $17.9 billion, ranks as the tenth largest among all universities in the country. The university ranks 86th in endowment per student. The law school's endowment, totaling over $500 million, has a significantly higher per-student value compared to that of its parent university. It ranks as the eighth wealthiest law school in the nation in 2022.

==== Faculty compensation ====
As of 2026, the university reported an overall average faculty salary of $149,600, with compensation varying by academic rank: full professors earned an average of $206,800, associate professors $139,700, assistant professors $119,100, lecturers $91,900, and instructors $68,900. In terms of faculty composition, 52.3% of the faculty members are tenured, 15.0% are on the tenure track, and 32.8% hold non-tenure-track positions.

The university's average faculty salary ranked 43rd nationwide as of 2026, trailing peer institutions in California, New Jersey, Texas, and Virginia, as well as most large private universities. Faculty pay increases are determined by budget allocations, with input from advisory groups like the Senate Assembly and labor unions such as the Lecturers' Employee Organization.

=== Colleges and professional schools ===
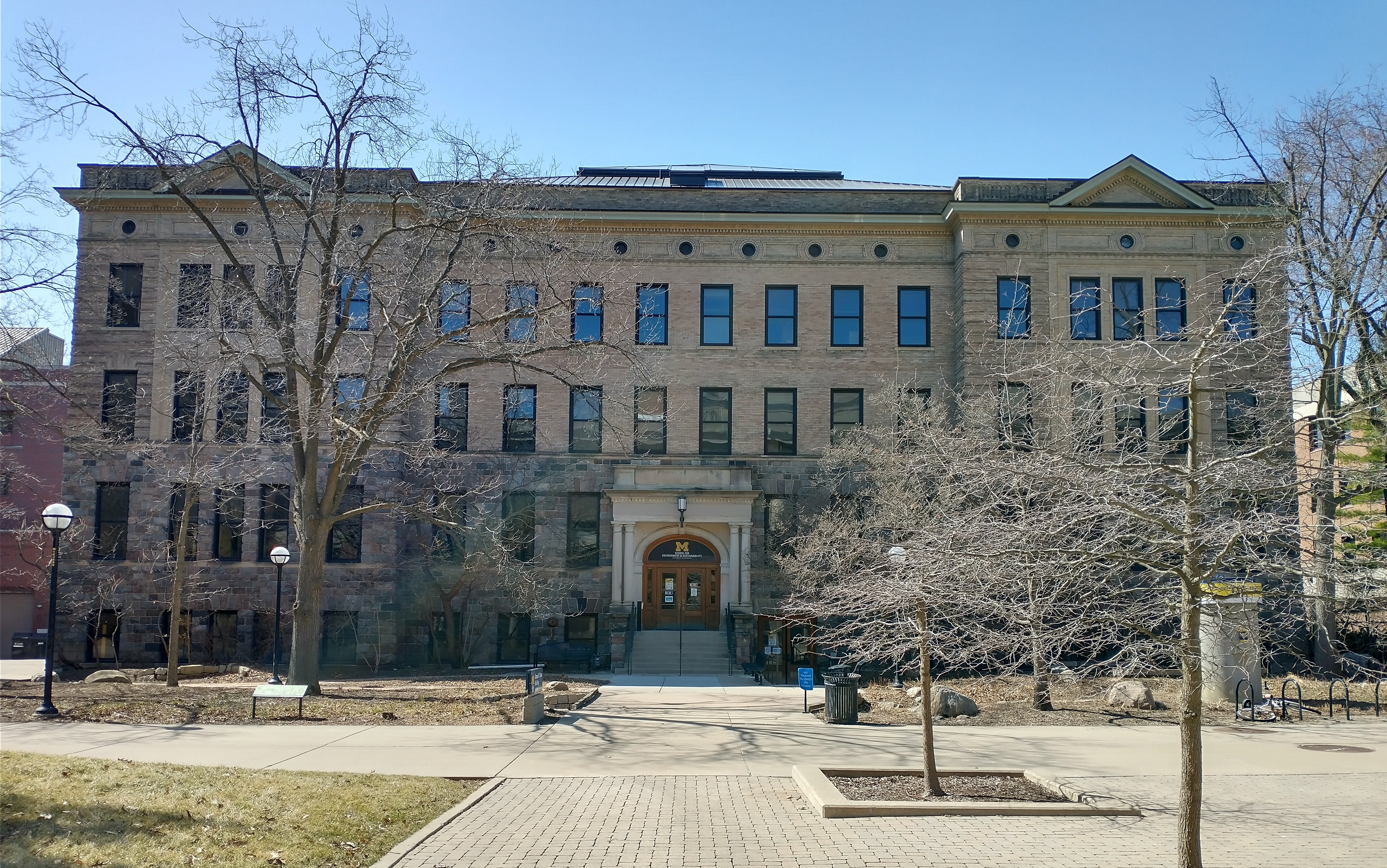
Samuel Trask Dana Building (West Medical Building) houses the School for Environment and Sustainability.

There are thirteen undergraduate schools and colleges. By enrollment, the three largest undergraduate units are the College of Literature, Science, and the Arts, the College of Engineering, and the Ross School of Business. At the graduate level, the Rackham School of Graduate Studies serves as the central administrative unit of graduate education at the university. There are 18 graduate schools and colleges. Professional degrees are conferred by the Taubman College of Architecture and Urban Planning, the School of Nursing, the School of Dentistry, the Law School, the Medical School, and the College of Pharmacy. Michigan Medicine, the university's health system, comprises the university's three hospitals, dozens of outpatient clinics, and many centers for medical care, research, and education.

| College/school | Year founded | Enrollment (FA 2023) | General Fund Budget ($, 2022–23) | Budget per student ($, 2022–23) |
|---|---|---|---|---|
| A. Alfred Taubman College of Architecture & Urban Planning | 1906 | 737 | 25,707,200 | 34,881 |
| School of Dentistry | 1875 | 670 | 41,055,284 | 61,277 |
| College of Engineering | 1837 | 11,113 | 276,845,246 | 24,912 |
| School for Environment and Sustainability | 1927 | 516 | 28,034,976 | 54,331 |
| School of Information | 1969 | 1,760 | 50,147,537 | 28,493 |
| School of Kinesiology | 1984 | 1,312 | 22,088,845 | 16,836 |
| Law School | 1859 | 1,017 | 57,495,856 | 56,535 |
| College of Literature, Science, and the Arts | 1841 | 21,973 | 522,704,411 | 23,788 |
| Marsal Family School of Education | 1921 | 371 | 19,058,427 | 51,370 |
| Medical School | 1850 | 1,677 | 124,714,812 | 74,368 |
| School of Music, Theatre & Dance | 1880 | 1,134 | 43,101,134 | 38,008 |
| School of Nursing | 1893 | 1,183 | 31,644,687 | 26,750 |
| College of Pharmacy | 1876 | 561 | 22,056,888 | 39,317 |
| School of Public Health | 1941 | 1,162 | 49,478,265 | 42,580 |
| Gerald R. Ford School of Public Policy | 1914 | 362 | 17,191,821 | 47,491 |
| Stephen M. Ross School of Business | 1924 | 4,433 | 137,479,144 | 31,013 |
| School of Social Work | 1951 | 940 | 31,557,111 | 33,571 |
| Penny W. Stamps School of Art & Design | 1974 | 740 | 18,111,495 | 24,475 |
| University of Michigan, Ann Arbor* | – | 52,065 | 2,590,485,130 | 49,755 |
*included other standalone units

== Academics ==
=== Teaching and learning ===
The university offers 133 undergraduate majors & degrees across the College of Engineering (18), College of Literature, Science, and the Arts (77), College of Pharmacy (1), Ford School of Public Policy (1), LSA Residential College (3), Marsal Family School of Education (3), Ross School of Business (1), School of Dentistry (1), School of Information (2), School of Kinesiology (3), School of Music, Theatre & Dance (16), School of Nursing (1), School of Public Health (2), Stamps School of Art & Design (2), and Taubman College of Architecture & Urban Planning (2). The most popular undergraduate majors, by 2021 graduates, were computer and information sciences (874), business administration and management (610), economics (542), behavioral neuroscience (319), mechanical engineering (316), experimental psychology (312).

The Horace H. Rackham School of Graduate Studies offers more than 180 graduate degree programs in collaboration with fourteen other schools and colleges. Nineteen graduate and professional degree programs, including the juris doctor, master of business administration, doctor of dental surgery, master of engineering, doctor of engineering, doctor of medicine, and doctor of pharmacy, are offered exclusively by the schools and colleges; Rackham does not oversee their administration. The university conferred 4,731 master's degrees, 892 academic doctorates, and 738 professional doctorates in 2021-22.

Undergraduate students participate in various research projects through the Undergraduate Research Opportunity Program (UROP) as well as the UROP/Creative-Programs.

=== Admissions ===
==== Undergraduate ====
Undergraduate admission statistics of the University of Michigan, Ann Arbor
| | 2025 | 2024 | 2023 | 2022 | 2021 |
|---|---|---|---|---|---|
First-time fall freshmen Early action & regular decision, combined
| Applicants | 109,112 | 98,310 | 87,632 | 84,289 | 79,743 |
| Admits | 17,915 | 15,373 | 15,722 | 14,914 | 16,071 |
| Admit rate | 16.42% | 15.64% | 17.94% | 17.69% | 20.15% |
| Enrolled | 8,178 | 7,278 | 7,466 | 7,050 | 7,290 |
| Yield | 45.65% | 47.34% | 47.49% | 47.27% | 45.36% |
| SAT range | 1370-1530 | 1360-1530 | 1350–1530 | 1350–1530 | 1360–1530 |
| ACT range | 32-34 | 31-34 | 31–34 | 31–34 | 31–35 |
Fall transfers
| Applicants | 6,845 | 6,832 | 6,113 | 5,633 | 4,942 |
| Admits | 2,394 | 2,385 | 2,109 | 2,062 | 2,051 |
| Admit rate | 34.97% | 34.91% | 34.50% | 36.61% | 41.50% |
| Enrolled | 1,533 | 1,580 | 1,414 | 1,342 | 1,407 |
| Yield | 64.04% | 66.25% | 67.05% | 65.08% | 68.60% |

Admission to the university is based on academic prowess, extracurricular activities, and personal qualities. The university practices need-blind admission for domestic applicants. It does not consider legacy preferences. Admissions officials consider a student's standardized test scores, application essay and letters of recommendation to be important academic factors, with emphasis on an applicant's academic record and GPA, while stating an applicant's high school class rank is 'not considered'. In terms of non-academic materials as of 2022, Michigan ranks character/personal qualities and whether the applicant is a first-generation university applicant as 'important' in making first-time, first-year admission decisions, while ranking extracurricular activities, talent/ability, geographical residence, state residency, volunteer work, work experience and level of applicant's interest as 'considered'. Some applicants to Music, Theatre and Dance and some applicants to the College of Engineering may be interviewed. A portfolio is required and considered for admission for Art, Architecture and the Ross School of Business. Submission of standardized test scores is recommended but not compulsory. Of the 55% of enrolled freshmen in 2025 who submitted SAT scores; the middle 50 percent Composite scores were 1370–1530. Of the 18% of the incoming freshman class who submitted ACT scores; the middle 50 percent Composite score was between 32 and 34.

U.S. News & World Report rates Michigan "Most Selective", and The Princeton Review rates its admissions selectivity of 96 out of 99. Admissions are characterized as "more selective, lower transfer-in" according to the Carnegie Classification. Michigan received over 87,000 applications for a place in the 2023–24 freshman class, making it one of the most applied-to universities in the United States. Of those students accepted to Michigan's Class of 2027, 7,466 chose to attend.

Since the fall of 2021, the university has had the largest number of students in the state, surpassing Michigan State University's former enrollment leadership. Given the state's shrinking pool of college-age students, there is public concern that the university's expansion could harm smaller schools by drawing away good students. Some of the state's regional public universities and smaller private colleges have already seen significant declines in enrollment, while others face difficulties in maintaining enrollment figures without lowering admission standards.

The university experienced an unexpected surge in student enrollment for the 2023 academic year, having admitted more students than it could support. This over-yield situation has placed considerable strain on student housing affordability, heightened faculty members' workloads, and stretched resources thin. The university is now embracing a steady-state admissions management strategy aimed at maintaining a stable class size.

==== Graduate ====
Doctoral program statistics of the Rackham Graduate School
| | 2025 | 2024 | 2023 | 2022 | 2021 |
|---|---|---|---|---|---|
| Applicants | 24,797 | 21,554 | 19,166 | 17,547 | 18,820 |
| Offers | ~2,210 | ~2,590 | ~2,870 | 2,480 | 2,349 |
| Selectivity | ~9% | ~12% | ~15% | 14.13% | 12.48% |
| Matriculations | 1,011 | 1,141 | 1,258 | 981 | 1,013 |
| Yield | ~46% | ~44% | ~44% | 39.56% | 43.12% |

The Horace H. Rackham School of Graduate Studies, the graduate school of the University of Michigan, received a total of 21,554 applications for admission into its doctoral programs for the 2024 admission year, encompassing the summer and fall terms. The school extended offers of admission to 2,586 applicants, representing 12.00% of the applicant pool. Subsequently, 1,102 of the offers were accepted, resulting in a yield rate of 42.61% for the academic year. Applicants may submit multiple applications to different doctoral programs and receive multiple offers, but can only matriculate into one program at a time. Doctoral programs that are not administered by Rackham are not included in the statistics.

The selectivity of admissions to doctoral programs varies considerably among different disciplines, with certain highly competitive fields exhibiting acceptance rates in the single digits. For instance, in 2023, the field of business administration admitted only 5.2% of its 519 applicants. Similarly, the field of sociology had a selectivity rate of 5.01%, selecting from a pool of 439 applicants. The field of psychology was even more competitive, with a selectivity rate of 4.1% out of 805 applicants. Other traditionally highly competitive fields are philosophy, public policy & economics, political science, and robotics.

==== History of admissions policies ====
Enrollment in University of Michigan-Ann Arbor (2013–2026)
| Academic year | Undergraduates | Graduate | Total enrollment |
|---|---|---|---|
| 2013–2014 | 28,283 | 15,427 | 43,710 |
| 2014–2015 | 28,395 | 15,230 | 43,625 |
| 2015–2016 | 28,312 | 15,339 | 43,651 |
| 2016–2017 | 28,964 | 15,754 | 44,718 |
| 2017–2018 | 29,821 | 16,181 | 46,002 |
| 2018–2019 | 30,318 | 16,398 | 46,716 |
| 2019–2020 | 31,266 | 16,824 | 48,090 |
| 2020–2021 | 31,329 | 16,578 | 47,907 |
| 2021–2022 | 32,282 | 17,996 | 50,278 |
| 2022–2023 | 32,695 | 18,530 | 51,225 |
| 2023–2024 | 33,730 | 18,335 | 52,065 |
| 2024–2025 | 34,454 | 18,401 | 52,855 |
| 2025–2026 | 35,358 | 18,130 | 53,488 |

In August 1841, the university first published its admission requirements for incoming freshmen. These criteria placed a strong emphasis on proficiency in ancient languages, particularly Latin and Greek. Prospective students faced an examination process that assessed their knowledge across various subjects, including arithmetic, algebra, English grammar, geography, Latin literature (Virgil and Cicero's Select Orations), Greek literature (Jacob's or Felton's Greek Reader), Latin grammar (Andrews and Stoddard's), and Greek grammar (Sophocles's).

A decade later, the university made a significant change to its admission policy. In 1851, it introduced a more flexible approach by waiving the ancient language requirement for students not pursuing the traditional collegiate course and allowing admission without examination in classical languages for these students. This adjustment can be viewed as a prelude to scientific education, signaling a gradual shift from the classical curriculum to a more diverse and modern academic offering.

In the early days of the university, admission requirements varied across different departments, and most admissions were based on referrals. However, in 1863, a standardized entrance examination was introduced, establishing a single set of qualifications for admission to all academic and professional departments. The university administration at the time praised the implementation of this entrance examination, recognizing its contribution to enhancing the admission process.

==== Affirmative action ====
In 2003, two lawsuits involving the university's affirmative action admissions policy reached the U.S. Supreme Court (Grutter v. Bollinger and Gratz v. Bollinger). U.S. President George W. Bush publicly opposed the policy before the court issued a ruling. The court found that race may be considered as a factor in university admissions in all public universities and private universities that accept federal funding, but it ruled that a point system was unconstitutional. In the first case, the court upheld the Law School admissions policy, while in the second it ruled against the university's undergraduate admissions policy. The debate continued because in November 2006, Michigan voters passed Proposal 2, banning most affirmative action in university admissions. Under that law, race, gender, and national origin can no longer be considered in admissions. The university and other organizations were granted a stay from implementation of the law soon after that referendum. This allowed time for proponents of affirmative action to decide legal and constitutional options in response to the initiative results. In April 2014, the Supreme Court ruled in Schuette v. Coalition to Defend Affirmative Action that Proposal 2 did not violate the U.S. Constitution. The admissions office states that it will attempt to achieve a diverse student body by looking at other factors, such as whether the student attended a disadvantaged school, and the level of education of the student's parents.

=== Student success ===
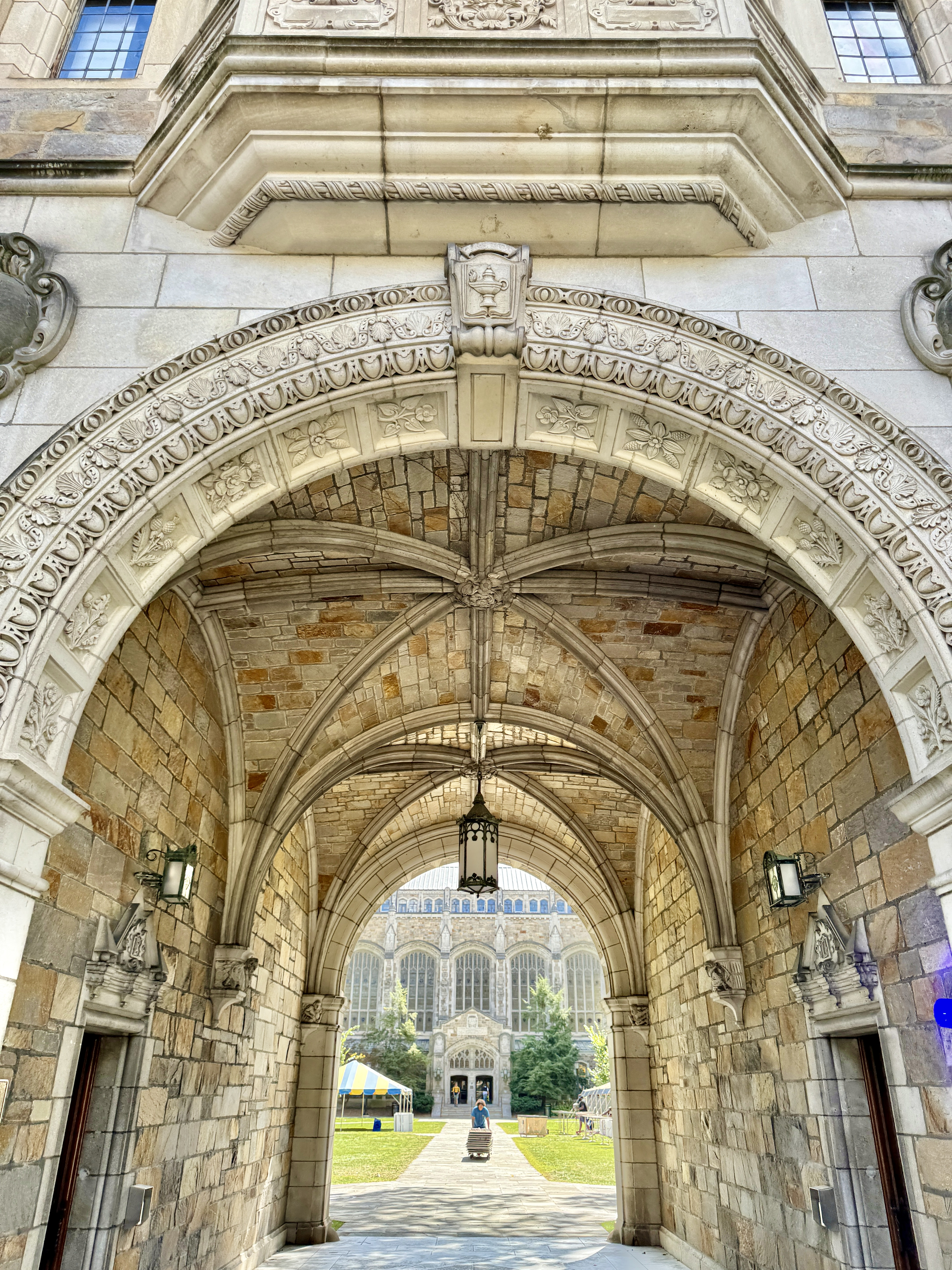
An archway leading into the Law Quadrangle from South University Avenue

The university is listed among the leading suppliers of undergraduate and graduate alumni to Silicon Valley tech firms. In 2015, the university ranked 6th on the list of top feeder schools for Google, which employed over 500 graduates at the time. The university ranked 10th on the list of top feeder schools for Meta. Google and Meta remain the university's first and second top employers in 2024.

In 2022, Michigan Ross ranked 11th among all business schools in the United States according to Poets & Quants, with its MBA graduates earning an average starting base salary of $165,000 and an average sign-on bonus of $30,000.

The U.S. Department of Education reports that as of June 2024, federally aided students who attended University of Michigan-Ann Arbor had a median annual income of $83,648 (based on 2020-2021 earnings adjusted to 2022 dollars) five years after graduation. This figure exceeds both the midpoint for 4-year schools of $53,617 and the U.S. real median personal income of $40,460 for the year 2021 adjusted to 2022 dollars. Federally aided bachelor's graduates from the university's largest program, computer and information science, which had over 950 students in the 2020-21 cohort, had a median annual income of $153,297 five years after graduation. (Note: See College Scorecard)

According to data from the U.S. Department of Education, law tops the list of most valuable first professional degrees offered by the university when ranked by earnings potential in 2022, with its federally aided students earning a median salary of $197,273 five years after graduation. Dentistry ($158,677), pharmacy ($142,224), and medicine ($134,187) follow behind in that order.

The fields of business administration ($140,827), economics ($108,627), mathematics ($107,395), and statistics ($105,494) are among the bachelor's degree programs with the highest earning potential offered by the university. In 2022, the university's federally aided students in these programs were earning median salaries exceeding the $100,000 threshold five years after graduation. Additionally, various engineering disciplines such as computer engineering ($123,120), aerospace, aeronautical, and astronautical engineering ($113,025), industrial engineering ($109,239), electrical, electronics and communications engineering ($109,107), mechanical engineering ($101,514), chemical engineering ($100,000) are among the top-earning majors. Computer sciences ($153,297) and information science ($125,257) also fall into this high-earning category.

Among all first-time freshman students who enrolled at the university in fall 2017, 82.0% graduated within four years (by August 31, 2021); 10.2% graduated in more than four years but in five years or less (after August 31, 2021, and by August 31, 2022); 1.1% graduated in more than five years but in six years or less (after August 31, 2022, and by August 31, 2023). The percentage of undergraduate students from the fall 2022 cohort returning in fall 2023 was 98.0% for full-time freshman students.

=== Libraries and publications ===
The University of Michigan library system comprises nineteen individual libraries with twenty-four separate collections—roughly 13.3 million volumes as of 2012. The university was the original home of the JSTOR database, which contains about 750,000 digitized pages from the entire pre-1990 backfile of ten journals of history and economics, and has initiated a book digitization program in collaboration with Google. The University of Michigan Press is also a part of the library system.

Several academic journals are published at the university:

- The Law School publishes Michigan Law Review and six other law journals: The Michigan Journal of Environmental and Administrative Law, University of Michigan Journal of Law Reform, Michigan Journal of Race & Law, Michigan Telecommunications and Technology Law Review, Michigan Journal of International Law, and Michigan Journal of Gender and Law.
- The Ross School of Business publishes the Michigan Journal of Business.
- Several undergraduate journals are also published at the university, including the Michigan Journal of Political Science, Michigan Journal of History, University of Michigan Undergraduate Research Journal, the Michigan Journal of International Affairs, and the Michigan Journal of Asian Studies.

=== Museums and collections ===
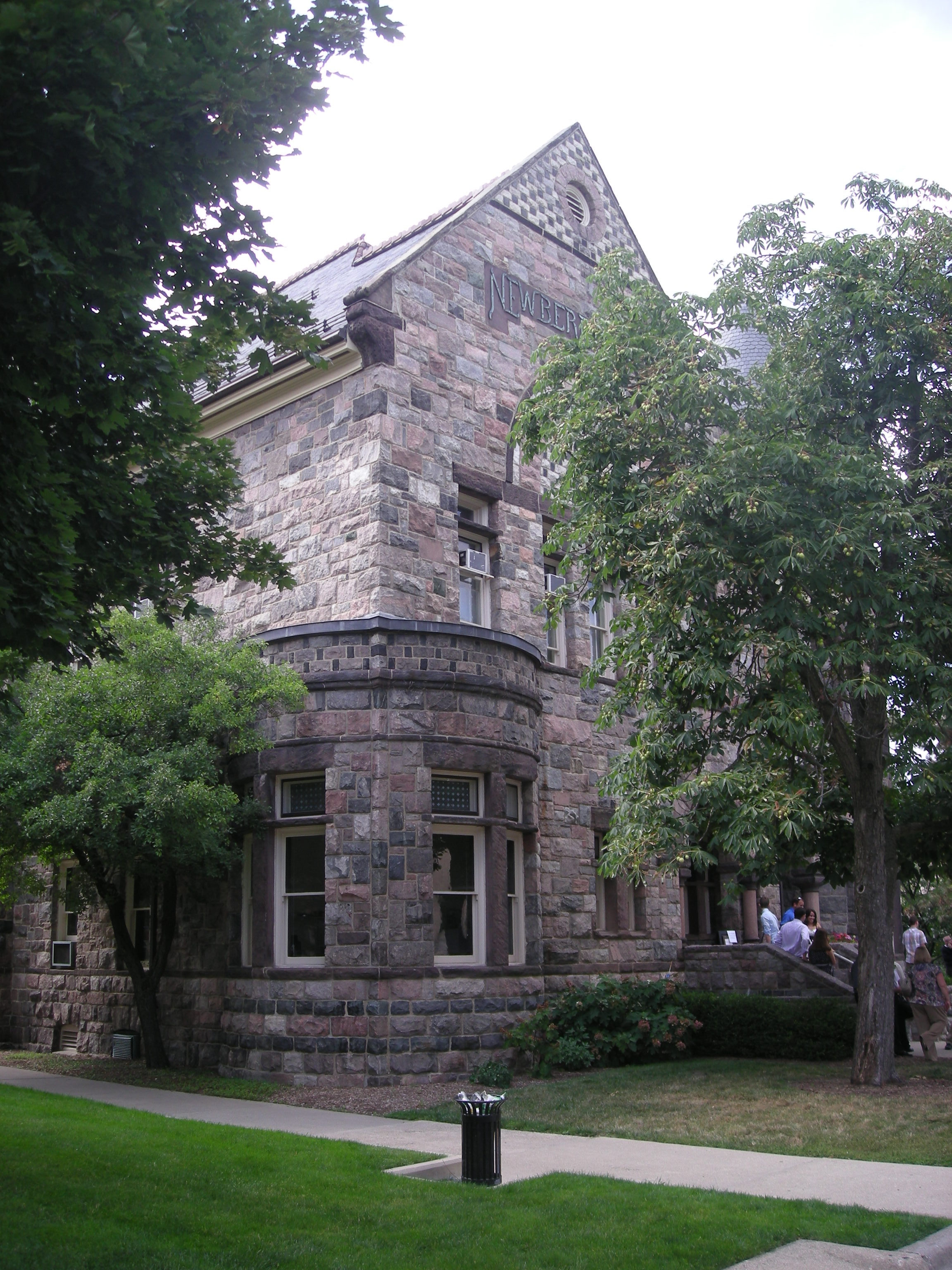
Newberry Hall (Kelsey Museum of Archeology)

The university is also home to several public and research museums including but not limited to the University Museum of Art, University of Michigan Museum of Natural History, Detroit Observatory, Sindecuse Museum of Dentistry, and the LSA Museum of Anthropological Archaeology.

Kelsey Museum of Archeology has a collection of Roman, Greek, Egyptian, and Middle Eastern artifacts. Between 1972 and 1974, the museum was involved in the excavation of the archaeological site of Dibsi Faraj in northern Syria. The Kelsey Museum re-opened November 1, 2009, after a renovation and expansion.

The collection of the University of Michigan Museum of Art include nearly 19,000 objects that span cultures, eras, and media and include European, American, Middle Eastern, Asian, and African art, as well as changing exhibits. The Museum of Art re-opened in 2009 after a three-year renovation and expansion. UMMA presents special exhibitions and diverse educational programs featuring the visual, performing, film and literary arts that contextualize the gallery experience.

The University of Michigan Museum of Natural History began in the mid-19th century and expanded greatly with the donation of 60,000 specimens by Joseph Beal Steere in the 1870s.

=== Reputation and rankings ===
Academic rankings

National
- Forbes: 21
- U.S. News & World Report: 25 (tie)
- WSJ/College Pulse: 25

Global
- ARWU: 35
- QS: 51
- THE: 23
- U.S. News & World Report: 21

The university places an emphasis on research and on attracting influential academics to join its faculty. It is a large, four-year, residential research university accredited by the Higher Learning Commission. The four-year, full-time undergraduate program comprises the majority of enrollments and emphasizes instruction in the arts, sciences, and professions with a high level of coexistence between graduate and undergraduate programs. The university has "very high" research activity and the comprehensive graduate program offers doctoral degrees in the humanities, social sciences, and STEM fields as well as professional degrees in medicine, law, and dentistry. The university has been included on the list of Public Ivies. (Note: Sources identify the University of Michigan as one of the Public Ivy institutions: Moll (1985, pp. 61–83); Greene & Greene (2001, p. 148); Gelber (2011, p. 177); Domina et al. (2019, p. 293))

==== Comprehensive rankings ====
The 2025-2026 U.S. News & World Report Best Global Universities report ranked the university 21st among world universities with a global score of 83.2.

University of Michigan-Ann Arbor was ranked 26th among world universities in 2023 by the Academic Ranking of World Universities, based on the number of alumni or staff as Nobel laureates and Fields Medalists, the number of highly cited researchers, the number of papers published in Nature and Science, the number of papers indexed in the Science Citation Index Expanded and Social Sciences Citation Index, and the per capita academic performance of the institution.

The 2024 edition of the CWUR Rankings ranked the university 13th nationally and 16th globally, with an overall score of 89.1, taking into account all four areas evaluated by CWUR: education, employability, faculty, and research. This metric evaluates the number of faculty members who have received prestigious academic distinctions (10% weight). The university's employability ranking is 42nd globally, based on the professional success of the university's alumni, measured relative to the institution's size (25% weight). In the education category, the university is ranked 35th globally. This metric assesses the academic success of the university's alumni, measured relative to the institution's size (25% weight).

In the 2025 QS World University Rankings, University of Michigan-Ann Arbor was ranked 44th in the world, its lowest position in 10 years, with an overall score of 79.

==== Specific rankings ====
Michigan was ranked 6th in the 2021 U.S. News & World Report Best Undergraduate Engineering Programs Rankings. Michigan was ranked 3rd in the 2021 U.S. News & World Report Best Undergraduate Business Programs Rankings. The 2020 Princeton Review College Hopes & Worries Survey ranked Michigan as the No. 9 "Dream College" among students and the No. 7 "Dream College" among parents.

Department rankings
| Institution | | US rank | Year | Change (Y/Y) | Source |
|---|---|---|---|---|---|
College of Engineering
| College of Engineering | Aerospace Engineering | 6 | 2024 | ▲1 | U.S. News |
| College of Engineering | Biomedical Engineering | =10 | 2024 | ▼1 | U.S. News |
| College of Engineering | Chemical Engineering | =7 | 2024 | | U.S. News |
| College of Engineering | Civil Engineering | =5 | 2024 | Steady | U.S. News |
| College of Engineering | Computer Engineering | =6 | 2024 | ▲1 | U.S. News |
| College of Engineering | Electrical Engineering | =7 | 2024 | ▼3 | U.S. News |
| College of Engineering | Environmental Engineering | =2 | 2024 | Steady | U.S. News |
| College of Engineering | Industrial Engineering | 2 | 2024 | Steady | U.S. News |
| College of Engineering | Materials Engineering | =8 | 2024 | ▼1 | U.S. News |
| College of Engineering | Mechanical Engineering | =6 | 2024 | ▼1 | U.S. News |
| College of Engineering | Nuclear Engineering | 1 | 2024 | Steady | U.S. News |
School of Public Health
| School of Public Health | Biostatistics | 4 | 2022 | | U.S. News |
| School of Public Health | Health Care Management | =3 | 2023 | | U.S. News |
| College of Literature, Science, and the Arts | Biological Sciences | =23 | 2022 | | U.S. News |
| College of Literature, Science, and the Arts | Chemistry | =14 | 2023 | | U.S. News |
| College of Literature, Science, and the Arts | Earth Sciences | =9 | 2023 | | U.S. News |
| College of Literature, Science, and the Arts | Economics | =12 | 2022 | | U.S. News |
| College of Literature, Science, and the Arts | English | =8 | 2021 | | U.S. News |
| College of Literature, Science, and the Arts | History | =2 | 2021 | | U.S. News |
| College of Literature, Science, and the Arts | Mathematics | 11 | 2023 | | U.S. News |
| College of Literature, Science, and the Arts | Physics | =13 | 2023 | | U.S. News |
| College of Literature, Science, and the Arts | Political Science | =4 | 2021 | | U.S. News |
| College of Literature, Science, and the Arts | Psychology | =3 | 2022 | | U.S. News |
| College of Literature, Science, and the Arts | Sociology | =2 | 2021 | | U.S. News |
| College of Literature, Science, and the Arts | Statistics | =7 | 2022 | | U.S. News |
| Stephen M. Ross School of Business | Part-time MBA | 6 | 2024 | ▲1 | U.S. News |
| School of Nursing | Midwifery | =6 | 2024 | ▼4 | U.S. News |

=== Research ===
R&D statistics, by year
| | National Science Foundation | | National Academies of Sciences, Engineering, and Medicine | |
|---|---|---|---|---|
| | Total R&D expenditures ($000) | National rank | National; Academy members | National rank |
| 2024 | – | – | 139 | – |
| 2023 | 1,925,875 | 4 | – | – |
| 2022 | 1,770,708 | 4 | – | – |
| 2021 | 1,639,645 | 3 | – | – |
| 2020 | 1,673,862 | 2 | – | – |
| 2019 | 1,675,805 | 2 | 120 | 10 |
| 2018 | 1,600,869 | 2 | 118 | 9 |
| 2017 | 1,530,139 | 2 | 113 | 12 |

The University of Michigan is one of the twelve founding members of the Association of American Universities, a consortium of the leading research universities in North America. The university manages the fourth-largest research budget of any university in the United States, with total R&D expenditures of $1.925 billion in 2023. The federal government was the main source of funding, with grants from the National Science Foundation, National Institutes of Health, NASA, Department of Defense, Department of Energy, Department of Transportation, and National Oceanic and Atmospheric Administration (NOAA), collectively accounting for over half of the research volume.

The first measurement of the magnetic moment and spin of free electrons and positrons was conducted by H. Richard Crane, an experimental physicist at the university. The university operated the Ford Nuclear Reactor from 1933 to 1955, during which it conducted extensive research related to nuclear energy. It currently hosts several major research centers focusing on optics, reconfigurable manufacturing systems, and wireless integrated microsystems.

A pioneer in computing technology, the university designed and built the Michigan Terminal System, an early time-sharing computer operating system, and was involved in the development of the NSFnet national backbone, which is regarded as the foundation upon which the global Internet was built. In 2024, the university began collaborating with Los Alamos National Laboratory on high-performance computing and AI research.

The first inactivated flu vaccine was developed by Thomas Francis Jr. and Jonas Salk at Michigan. This was the first of many advancements at the university related to vaccination, including the development of a live attenuated influenza vaccine by Hunein Maassab. The university also introduced histotripsy, a non-invasive technique that uses focused ultrasound to treat diseased tissue, and has made significant contributions to medical technology with innovations such as the EKG and gastroscope.

In the social sciences, the Klein–Goldberger model, an enhanced macroeconomic model, was developed by Lawrence Klein and Arthur Goldberger at the university. George Katona created consumer confidence measures in the late 1940s. J. David Singer initiated the Correlates of War project in 1963 to compile scientific knowledge about war. The American National Election Studies, established with a National Science Foundation grant in 1977, has been based at the university and partnered with Stanford University since 2005. The Institute for Social Research, established in 1949, is the nation's longest-standing laboratory for interdisciplinary research in the social sciences.

| | Clarivate (Web of Science) | Nature Index | | | ARWU | NTU Rankings | URAP |
|---|---|---|---|---|---|---|---|
| | Highly Cited; Researchers | Share** | National rank | Global rank | World rank | World rank | World rank |
| 2024 | 25 | – | – | – | 30 | 13 | – |
| 2023 | 28 | 380.50 | 4 | 21 | 26 | 10 | 16 |
| 2022 | 32 | 372.55 | 6 | 23 | 28 | 14 | 12 |
| 2021 | 27 | 338.53 | 6 | 24 | 26 | 9 | 8 |
| 2020 | 29 | 398.65 | 4 | 16 | 22 | 9 | 8 |
| 2019 | 37 | 343.97 | 5 | 19 | 20 | 8 | 8 |
| 2018 | 38 | 344.07 | 6 | 19 | 27 | 7 | 9 |
| 2017 | 20 | 336.04 | 5 | 16 | 24 | 7 | – |
**Time frame: January 1 – December 31

The university has been featured in multiple bibliometric rankings that assess its impact on academic publications through citation analysis. The University Ranking by Academic Performance for 2023–24 has positioned the university at 16th globally. Additionally, in 2024, the Performance Ranking of Scientific Papers for World Universities ranked it 13th worldwide. The university has a significant presence in the Nature Index, ranking 6th nationally and 23rd globally among research institutions, with a share of 365.97 and a count of 1199 in 2022. The university boasted 28 researchers who were recognized by Clarivate as being highly cited in 2023. In 2019, the university had 120 faculty members who were national academy members, placing it 10th among its peers in this metric.

The university is a member of the international research association Universities Research Association and the state-wide University Research Corridor. Beginning in 2005, the university operated the UM-SJTU Joint Institute with Shanghai Jiao Tong University, but in 2025, it withdrew from the partnership due to national security concerns.

== Student life ==
=== Student body ===
Race and ethnicity of undergraduate students^{†}
1. White (49.0%)
2. Asian (19.0%)
3. Hispanic (10.0%)
4. International (8.00%)
5. Black (5.00%)
6. Multiracial (5.00%)
7. Unknown (4.00%)
^{†} "Hispanic" includes Hispanics of any race. All other categories refer to non-Hispanics.

As of fall 2023, the Ann Arbor campus had 52,065 students enrolled: 33,730 undergraduate students and 18,335 graduate students. The total number of employees reached 53,831, which included 21,475 individuals working with Michigan Medicine, 6,114 supplemental staff, 7,820 faculty members, and 18,422 regular staff. The largest college at the university was the College of Literature, Science, and the Arts with 21,973 students (42.2% of the total student body), followed by the College of Engineering (11,113; 21.3%) and Ross School of Business (4,433; 8.1%). All other colleges each hosted less than 5% of the total student population.

Students come from all 50 U.S. states and nearly 100 countries. As of 2022, 52% of undergraduate students were Michigan residents, while 43% came from other states. The remainder of the undergraduate student body was composed of international students. Of the total student body, 43,253 (83.1%) were U.S. citizens or permanent residents and 8,812 (16.9%) were international students as of November 2023.

As of October 2023, 53% of undergraduate students self-identified as White, 17% as Asian, 7% as Hispanic, 4% as Black, 5% as belonging to two or more races, and 5% as having an unknown racial composition. The remaining 8% of undergraduates were international students.

According to a 2017 report by the New York Times, the median family income of a student at Michigan was $154,000. 66% of students came from families within the top 20% in terms of income. As of 2022, approximately 18% of undergraduate students received a Pell Grant.

=== Groups and activities ===
By 2012, the university had 1,438 student organizations. With a history of student activism, some of the most visible groups include those dedicated to causes such as civil rights and labor rights, such as local chapters of Students for a Democratic Society and United Students Against Sweatshops. Conservative groups also organize, such as the Young Americans for Freedom.

There are also several engineering projects teams, including the University of Michigan Solar Car Team, which has placed first in the North American Solar Challenge ten times and podium in the World Solar Challenge seven times and the Wolverine Soft student-run game studio, which has released more than 15 video games on itch.io and Steam. Michigan Interactive Investments, the Tamid Israel Investment Group, and the Michigan Economics Society are also affiliated with the university.

The university also showcases many community service organizations and charitable projects, including Foundation for International Medical Relief of Children, Dance Marathon at the University of Michigan, The Detroit Partnership, Relay For Life, U-M Stars for the Make-A-Wish Foundation, InnoWorks at the University of Michigan, SERVE, Letters to Success, PROVIDES, Circle K, Habitat for Humanity, and Ann Arbor Reaching Out. Intramural sports are popular, and there are recreation facilities for each of the three campuses.

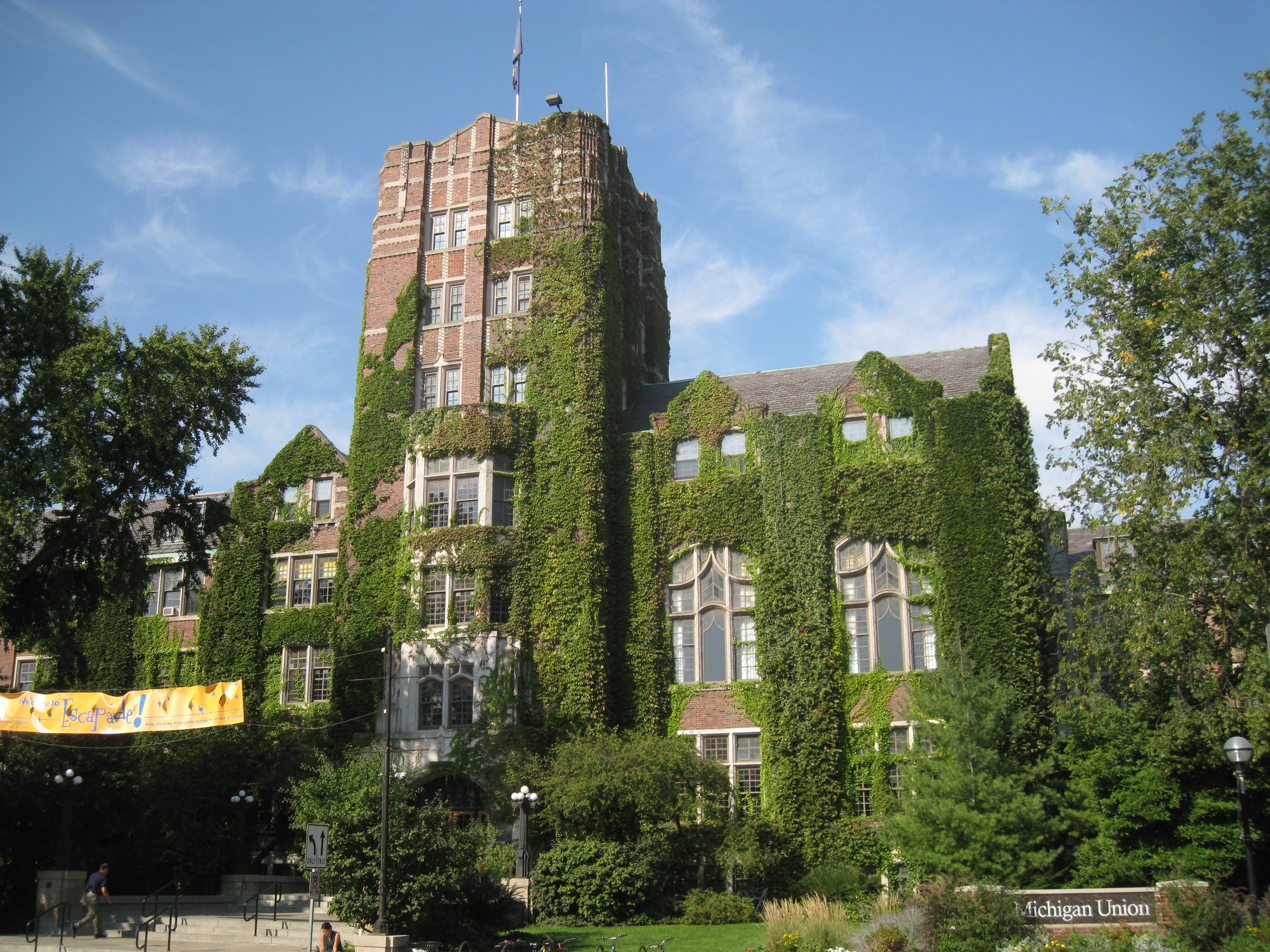
Michigan Union, a Collegiate Gothic building constructed on land wholly owned by the student society in 1917, was designed by Michigan alumni Irving Kane Pond and Allen Bartlit Pond.

The Michigan Union and Michigan League are student activity centers located on Central Campus; Pierpont Commons is on North Campus. The Michigan Union houses a majority of student groups, including the student government. The William Monroe Trotter House, located east of Central Campus, is a multicultural student center operated by the university's Office of Multi-Ethnic Student Affairs. The University Activities Center (UAC) is a student-run programming organization and is composed of 14 committees. Each group involves students in the planning and execution of a variety of events both on and off campus.

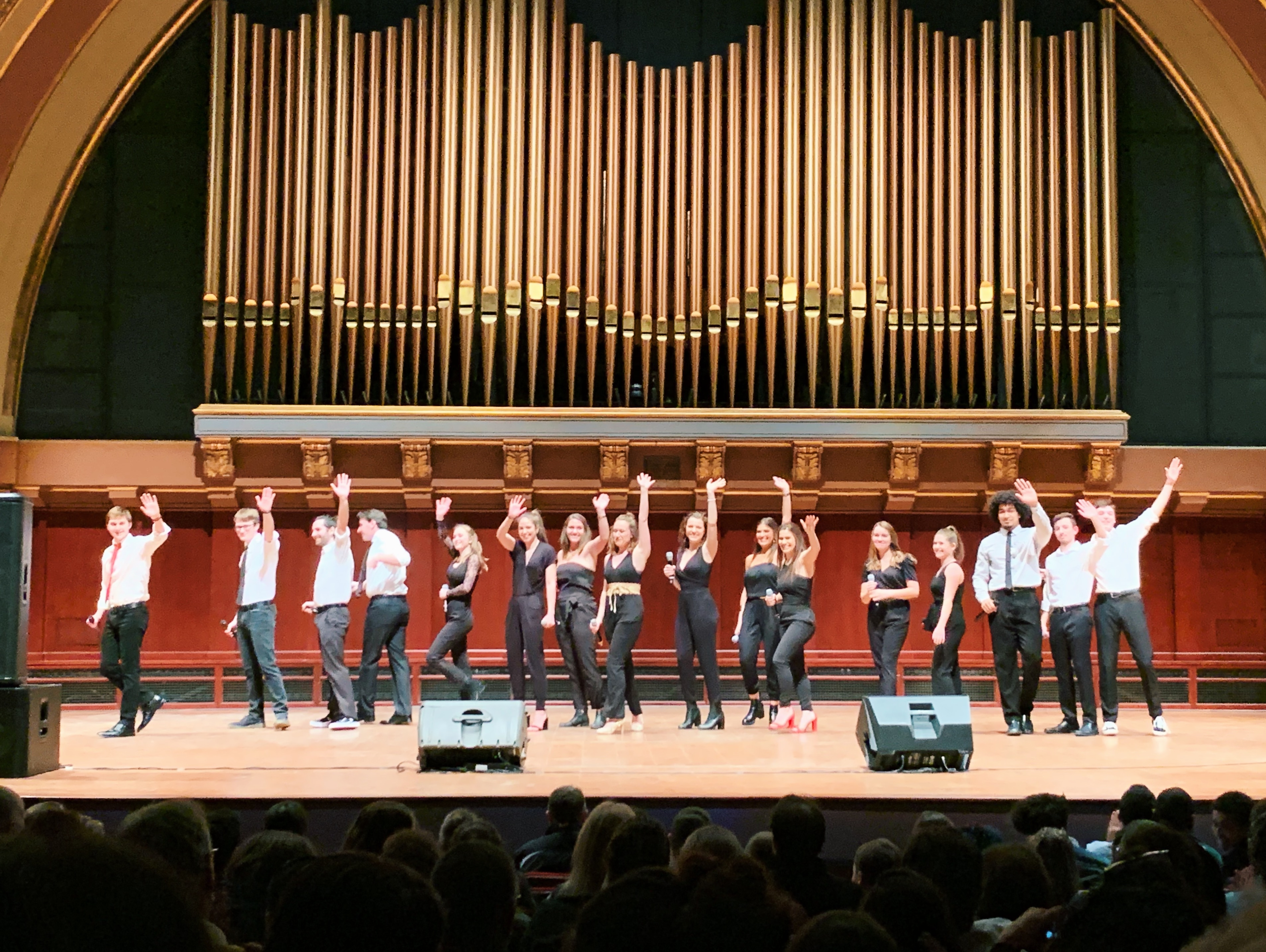
The Compulsive Lyres performing at the 2019 ICCA Quarterfinals

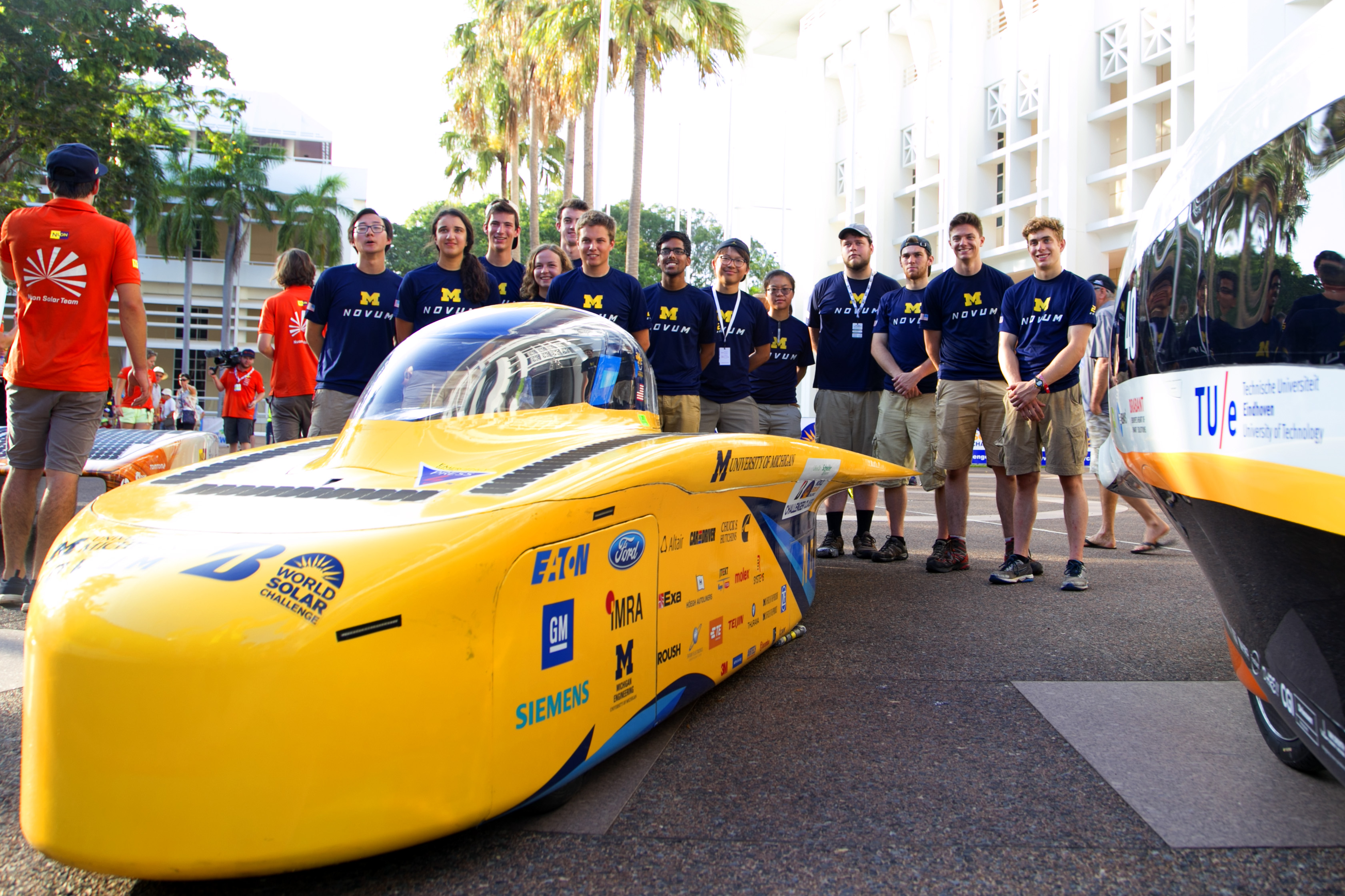
The Solar Car Team team poses for a group photo at the Bridgestone World Solar Challenge 2017 starting line.

The Michigan Marching Band, composed of more than 350 students from almost all of U-M's schools, is the university's marching band. Over 125 years old (with a first performance in 1897), the band performs at every home football game and travels to at least one away game a year. The student-run and led University of Michigan Pops Orchestra is another musical ensemble that attracts students from all academic backgrounds. It performs regularly in the Michigan Theater. The University of Michigan Men's Glee Club, founded in 1859 and the second oldest such group in the country, is a men's chorus with over 100 members. Its eight-member subset a cappella group, the University of Michigan Friars, which was founded in 1955, is the oldest currently running a cappella group on campus. The University of Michigan is also home to over twenty other a cappella groups, including Amazin' Blue, The Michigan G-Men, and Compulsive Lyres, all of which have competed at the International Championship of Collegiate A Cappella (ICCA) finals in New York City. The Michigan G-Men are one of only six groups in the country to compete at ICCA finals four times, one of only two TTBB ensembles to do so, and placed third at the competition in 2015. Amazin' Blue placed fourth at ICCA finals in 2017.

The University of Michigan also has over 380 cultural and ethnic student organizations on campus. These range the Arab Student Association to Persian Student Association to African Students Association to even the Egyptian Student Association.

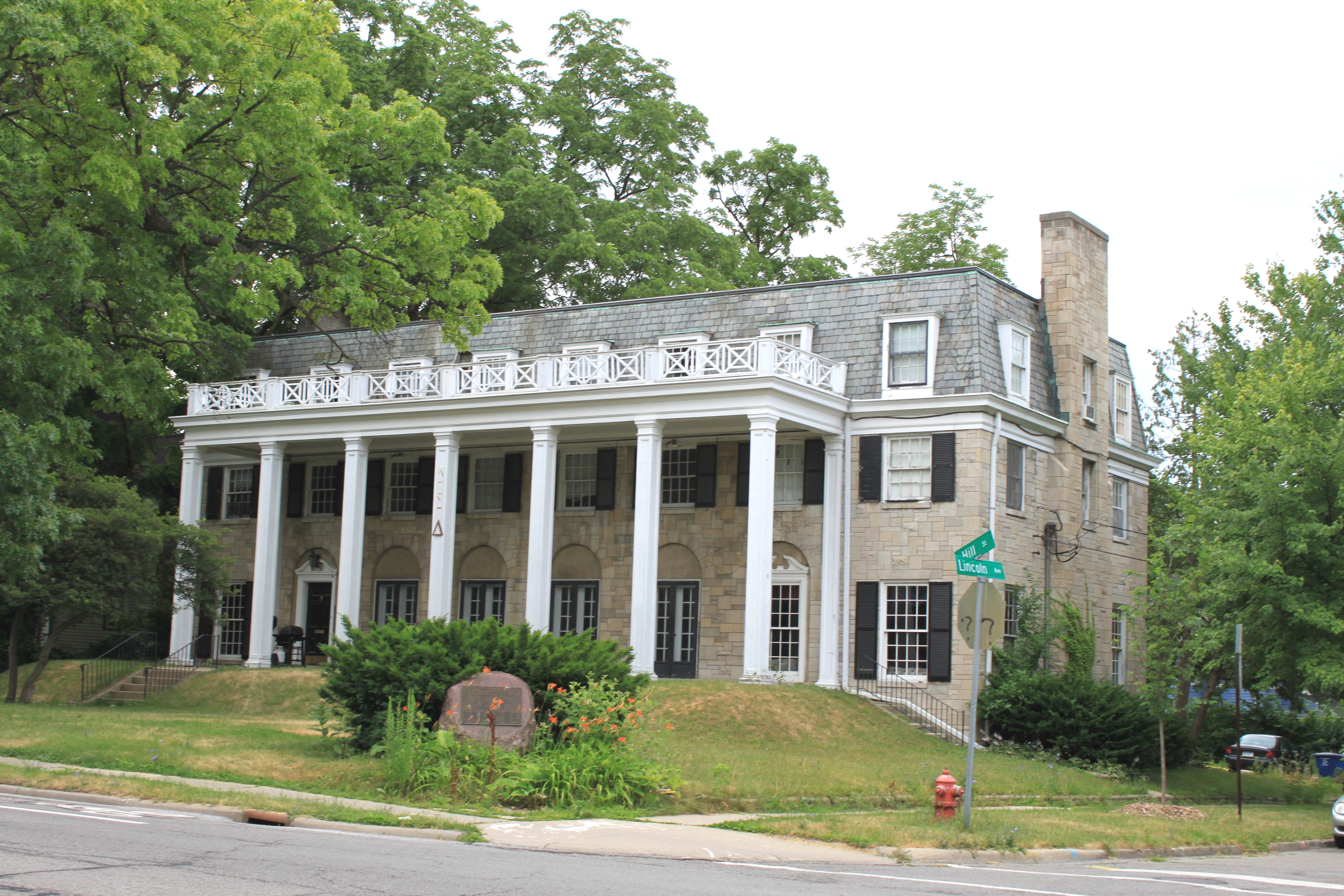
Delta Sigma Delta, the first dental fraternity in the world

Fraternities and sororities play a role in the university's social life; approximately seven percent of undergraduate men and 16% of undergraduate women are active in the Greek system. Four different Greek councils—the Interfraternity Council, Multicultural Greek Council, National Pan-Hellenic Council, and Panhellenic Association—represent most Greek organizations. Each council has a different recruitment process. National honor societies such as Phi Beta Kappa, Phi Kappa Phi, and Tau Beta Pi have chapters at U-M.

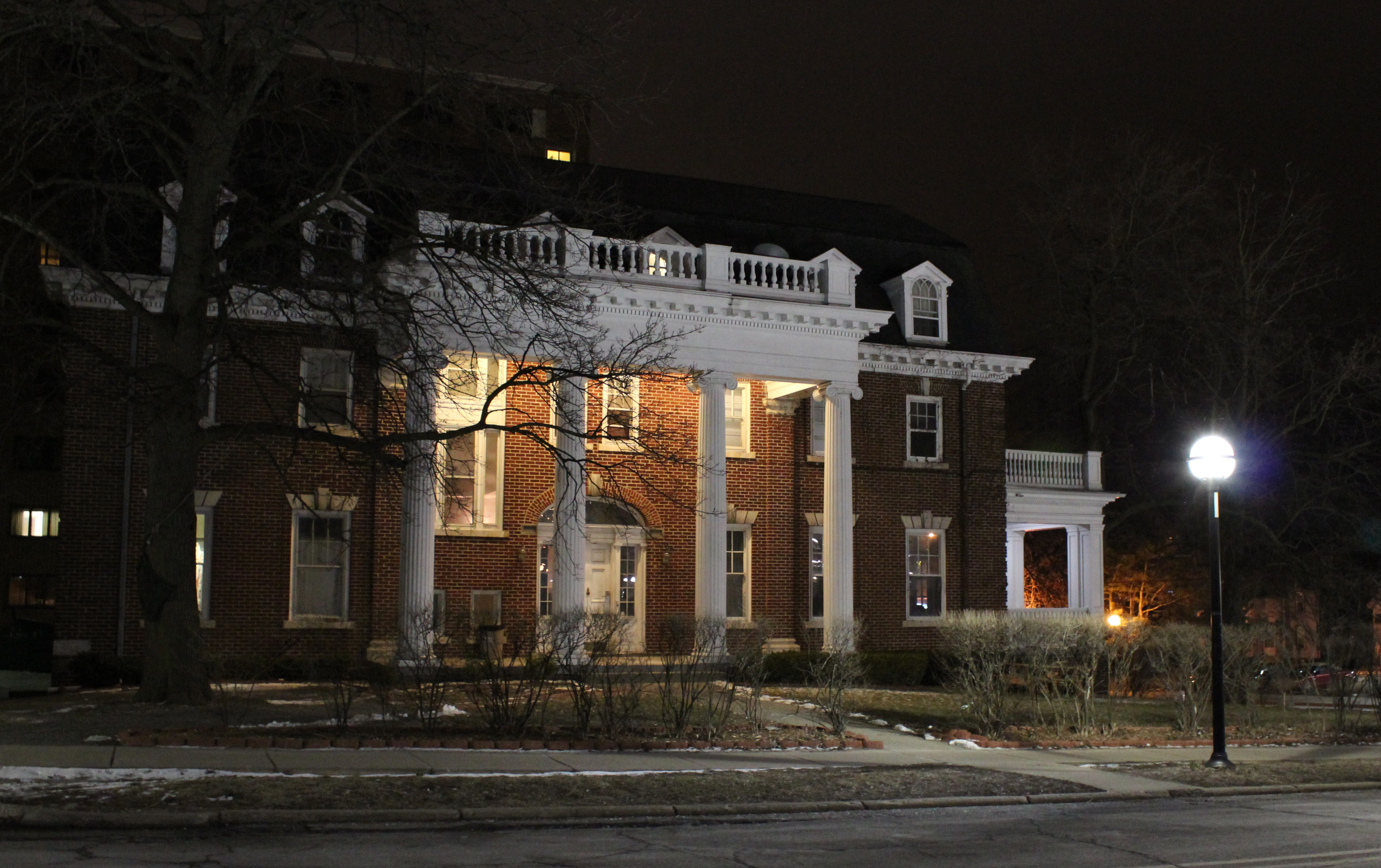
Phi Delta Phi, the oldest legal organization in continuous existence in the United States

The university hosts three secret societies: Michigauma, Adara, and the Vulcans. Michigauma and Adara were once under the umbrella group "The Tower Society", the name referring to their historical locations in the Michigan Union tower. Michigauma was all-male while Adara was all-female, although both later became co-ed.

- Michigauma, more recently known as the Order of Angell, was formed in 1902 by a group of seniors in coordination with university president James Burrill Angell. The group disbanded itself in 2021 due to public concerns about elitism and the society's history. The group was granted a lease for the top floor of the Michigan Union tower in 1932, which they referred to as the "tomb", but the society vacated the space in 2000. Until more recent reforms, the group's rituals were inspired by the culture of Native Americans. Some factions on campus identified Michigauma as a secret society, but many disputed that characterization, as its member list has been published some years in The Michigan Daily and the Michiganensian, and online since 2006 reforms.
- Adara, known as Phoenix, was formed in the late 1970s by women leaders on campus and disbanded itself in 2021 amid campus criticisms of secret societies. In the early 1980s they joined the tower society and occupied the sixth floor of the tower just below Michigamua.
- Vulcans occupied the fifth floor of the Union tower though were not formally a part of the tower society. They draw their heritage from the Roman god Vulcan. The group which used to do its tapping publicly is known for its long black robes and for its financial contributions of the College of Engineering.

=== Media and publications ===
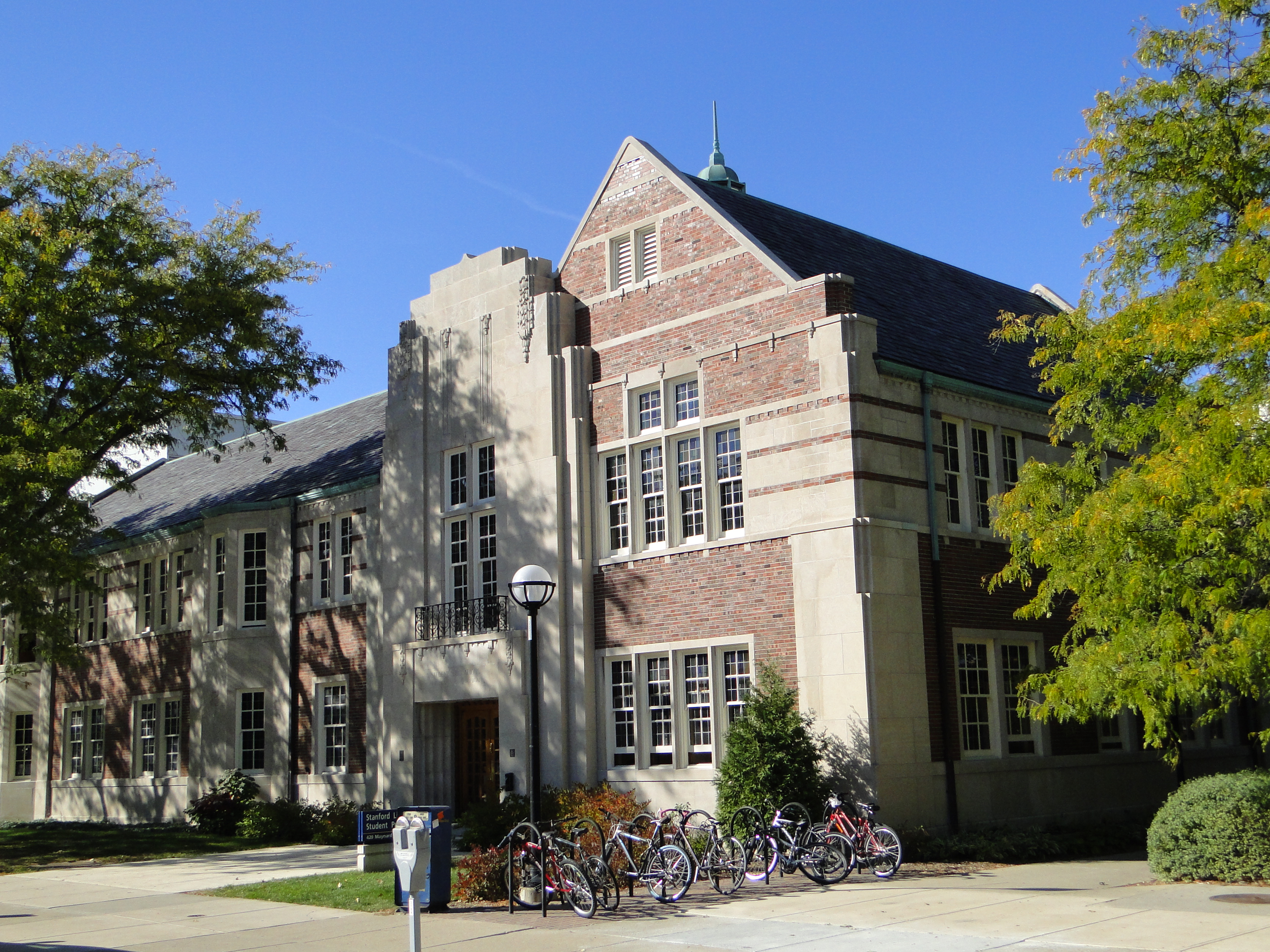
Stanford Lipsey Student Publications Building

The student newspaper is The Michigan Daily, which was founded in 1890 and is editorially and financially independent from the university. The Daily publishes daily online content and a weekly print edition. The yearbook is the Michiganensian, founded in 1896. Other student publications at the university include the conservative Michigan Review and the Gargoyle Humor Magazine.

WCBN-FM (88.3 FM) is the student-run college radio station which plays in freeform format. WOLV-TV is the student-run television station that is primarily shown on the university's cable television system. WJJX was previously the school's student-run radio station. A carrier current station, it was launched in 1953.

=== Safety ===
Violent crime is rare on campus, though there have been a few notorious cases, including Theodore Kaczynski's attempted murder of professor James V. McConnell and research assistant Nicklaus Suino in 1985. In 2022, David DePape, the man convicted of attacking Paul Pelosi, the husband of former U.S. House Speaker Nancy Pelosi, targeted Gayle Rubin, an associate professor of anthropology and women's studies at the university. DePape testified during his trial that he hoped to use Nancy and Paul Pelosi in an effort to get to Gayle Rubin.

In 2014, the University of Michigan was named one of 55 higher education institutions under investigation by the Office of Civil Rights "for possible violations of federal law over the handling of sexual violence and harassment complaints." President Barack Obama's White House Task Force to Protect Students from Sexual Assault was organized for such investigations. Seven years later, in 2021, the university attracted national attention when a report commissioned by the university was released that detailed an investigation into sexual assault allegations against doctor Robert Anderson who reportedly abused at least 950 university students, many of whom were athletes, from 1966 to 2003. Schembechler reportedly punched his then 10-year-old son Matthew after he reported abuse by Anderson. Following the exposure of a similar history of abuse at Ohio State University, male survivors of both Anderson at Michigan and Strauss at Ohio State spoke out to combat sexual abuse. The University of Michigan settled with the survivors for $490 million.

== Athletics ==
Burgee of University of Michigan

The university has 27 varsity intercollegiate sports, including 13 men's teams and 14 women's teams. Its intercollegiate sports teams participate in the Big Ten Conference in most sports, with the exception of the women's water polo team, which competes in the Collegiate Water Polo Association. The teams compete at the NCAA Division I level in all sports, including Division I FBS in football.

The teams share the nickname "Wolverines" with several other collegiate athletic teams in the country, such as the Utah Valley Wolverines, the Grove City Wolverines, and the Morris Brown Wolverines.

=== History ===
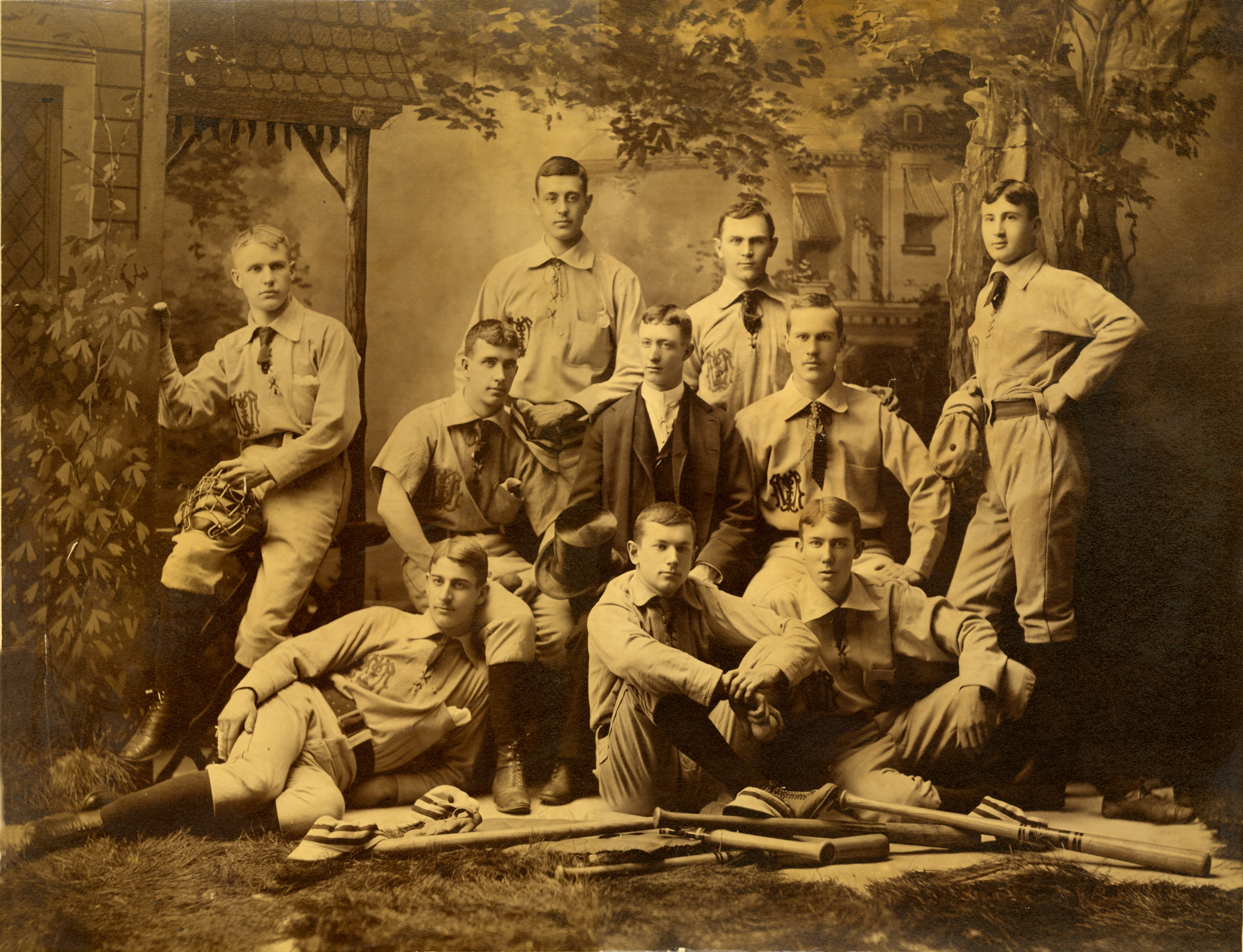
1886 Michigan baseball team

The university's athletic history dates back to the mid-19th century, beginning with the founding of the Pioneer Cricket Club in 1860. Varsity sports began in 1866 with the formation of the baseball team, followed by the football team in 1879 and the men's tennis team in 1893.

In 1896, the university became a founding member of the Intercollegiate Conference of Faculty Representatives, which later evolved into the Western Conference (1896–1899) and eventually became known as the Big Ten Conference (since 1950).

In 1905, the university found itself at the center of a national controversy regarding violence and professionalism in college football, which sparked discussions about potentially banning the sport from college campuses. That fall, Stanford President David Starr Jordan wrote a series of articles in Collier's, accusing various universities, including Michigan and its rival Chicago, of engaging in "professionalism". He labeled coach Fielding Yost as the "czar of Michigan's system" and claimed he was traveling across the country "soliciting expert players" who were not true student athletes. In response, Michigan President James Burrill Angell called for a reform conference on football and appointed Albert Pattengill to represent Michigan at the event.

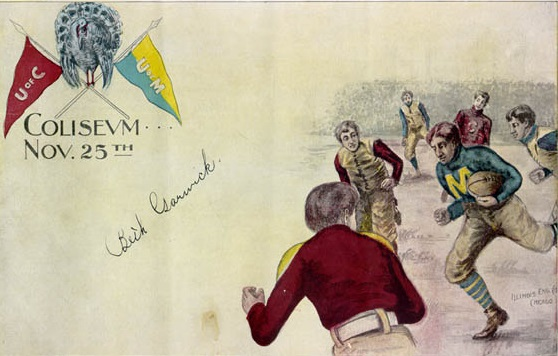
Souvenir program from 1897 for the Chicago–Michigan football rivalry game

The 1906 Angell Conference in Chicago led to several reform resolutions, including placing faculty in charge of gate receipts, banning summer training and the "training table", and capping admission prices for college athletic events at fifty cents. A key resolution targeted Michigan's highly paid football coach, Fielding Yost, by prohibiting the hiring of professional coaches. Michigan was expelled from the Big Nine Conference in April 1907 for noncompliance, partly due to the Yost Resolution. The university rejoined the conference in 1917 after a nine-year absence.

In 1926, Harvard made an agreement to play football against Michigan, dropping Princeton from its schedule due to past rough matches. Princeton perceived this move as a threat to the 'Big Three' relationship, fearing it would lose its status as a rival to Harvard and be relegated to a secondary class. By the 1930s, the 'Big Three' was restored and expanded into the Ivy League in 1939.

In 2023, during the NCAA's investigation into sign-stealing allegations against the football team's staff members, the university's board of regents considered the possibility of leaving the Big Ten Conference due to dissatisfaction with the conference's handling of the investigation. In 2025, the university again raised the possibility of leaving the Big Ten Conference to become independent, opposing the Big Ten's proposal for a media rights sale. Regent Jordan Acker stated that if Big Ten intended to move forward with the deal without the university, it "would be the end of Michigan, as far as I can see, in the Big Ten Conference."

=== Venues ===
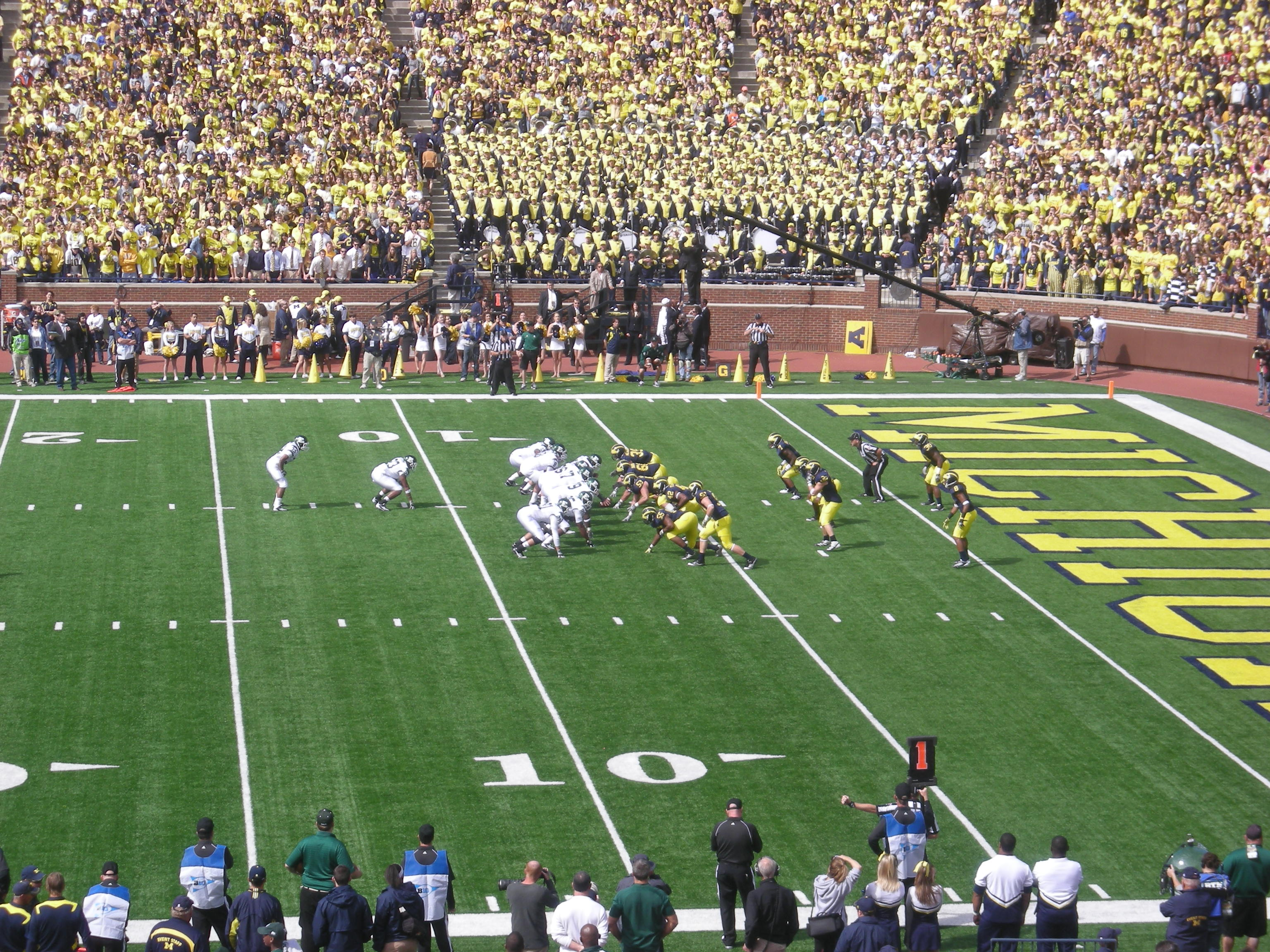
Michigan vs. Eastern Michigan football, 2011

The Ray Fisher Stadium, constructed in 1923, serves as the home venue for the baseball team. The Alumni Field at Carol Hutchins Stadium, formerly known as the Varsity Diamond, is the home field for the university's softball team. The Yost Ice Arena, opened in 1923, is the home arena for the men's ice hockey team. The Crisler Center, opened in 1967 and previously known as the University Events Building and Crisler Arena, serves as the home venue for the men's and women's basketball teams as well as the women's gymnastics team. The Phyllis Ocker Field, constructed in 1995 and built partially on the site of Regents Field, is the home venue for the university's field hockey teams.

Michigan Stadium is the largest stadium in the United States, and ranks third globally. Prior to the construction of Michigan Stadium in 1927, the football team played their home games at Regents Field. In 1902, Dexter M. Ferry donated land adjacent to Regents Field, and the entire complex was renamed Ferry Field. Ferry Field served as the home stadium for the football team until the opening of Michigan Stadium. Today, Ferry Field serves as a tailgating space for Michigan Stadium during football games.

=== Fight songs and chants ===
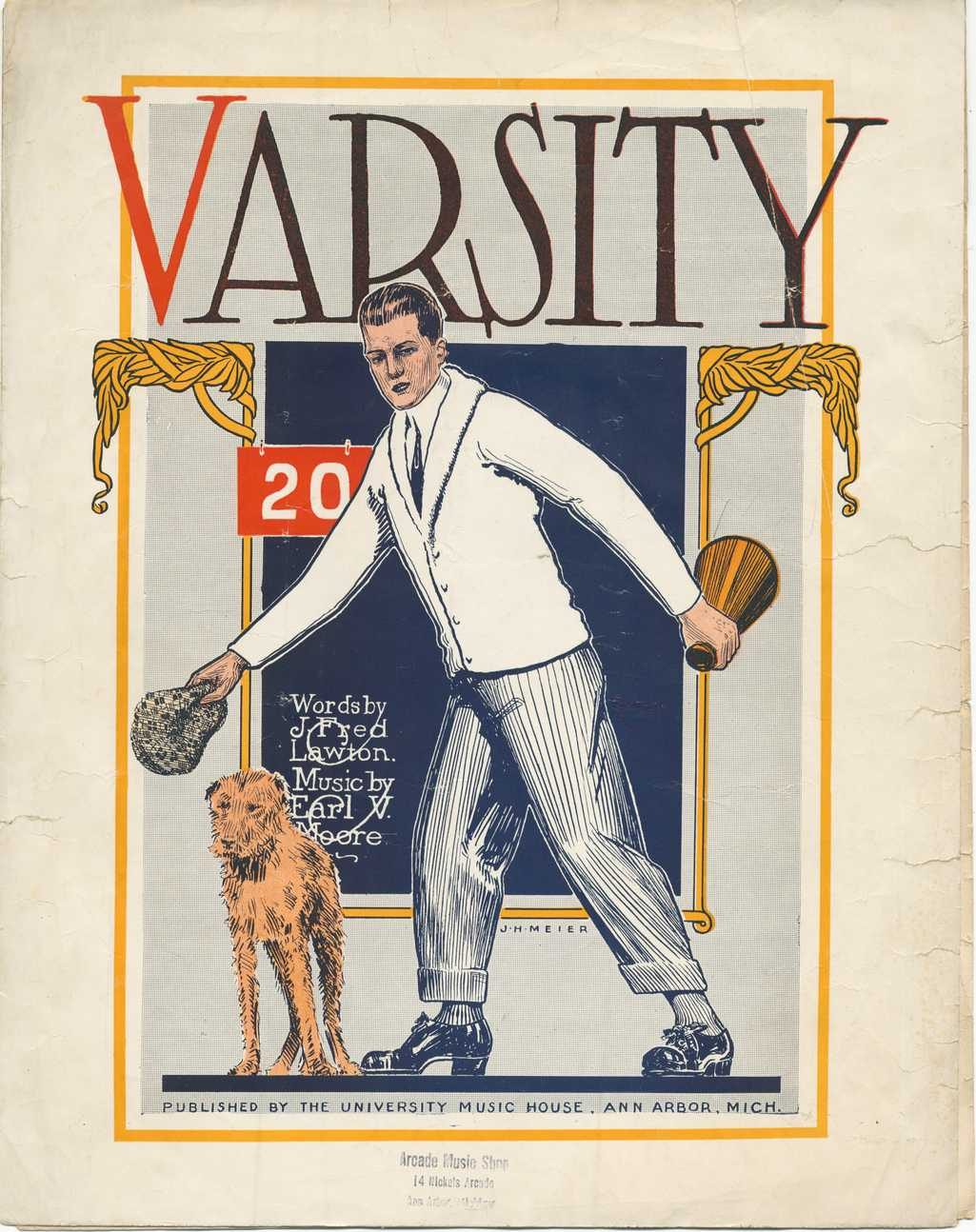
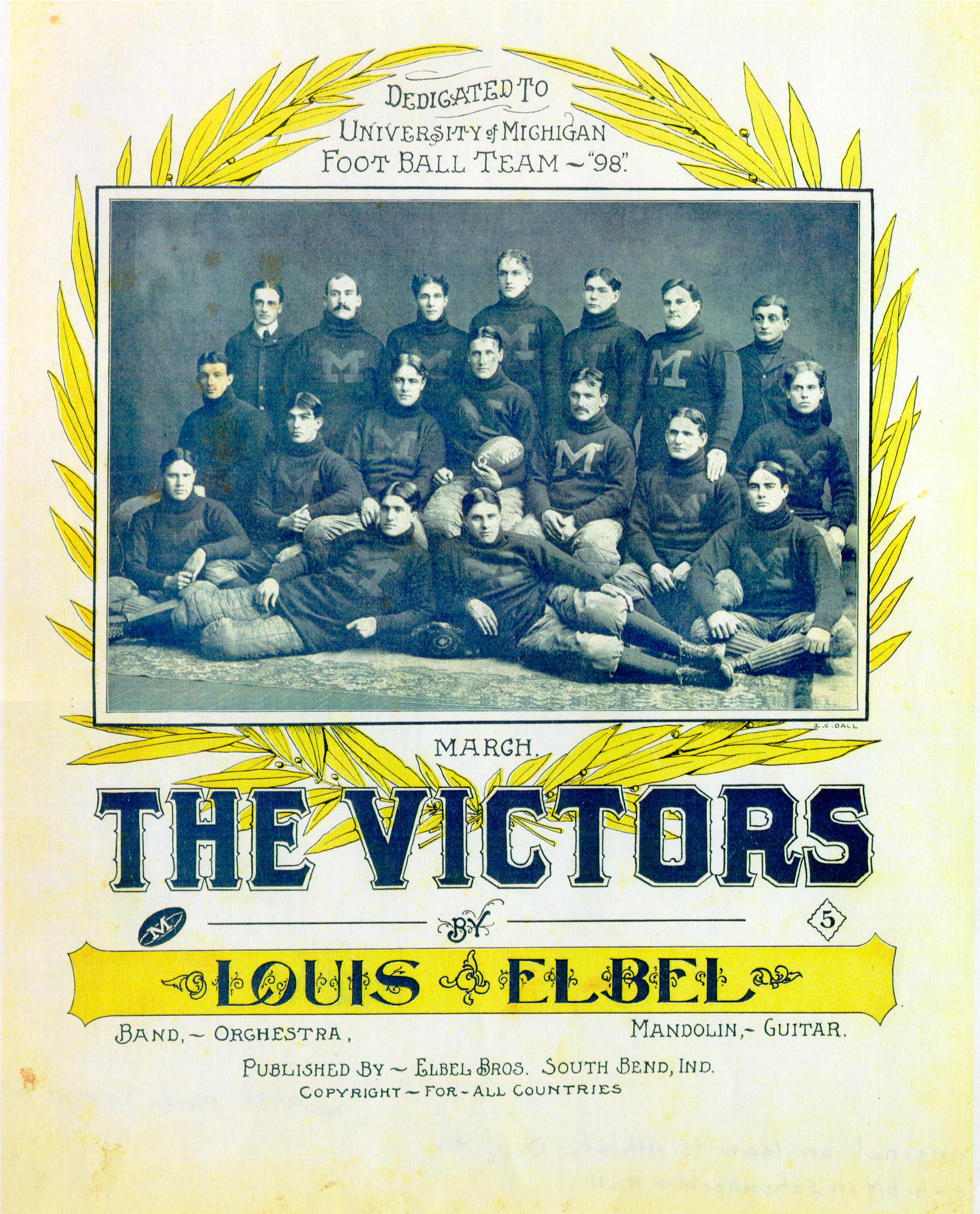
Sheet music covers of the Michigan fight songs "Varsity" (left) and "The Victors" (right)

The Michigan fight song, "The Victors", was written by student Louis Elbel in 1898. The song was declared by John Philip Sousa to be "the greatest college fight song ever written." The song refers to the teams as being "the Champions of the West". At the time, the Big Ten Conference was known as the Western Conference.

Although mainly used at sporting events, the Michigan fight song is often heard at other events as well. U.S. President Gerald Ford had it played by the United States Marine Band as his entrance anthem during his term as president from 1974 to 1977, in preference over the more traditional "Hail to the Chief", and the Michigan Marching Band performed a slow-tempo variation of the fight song at his funeral. The fight song is also sung during graduation commencement ceremonies. The university's alma mater song is "The Yellow and Blue". A common rally cry is "Let's Go Blue!" which has a complementary short musical arrangement written by former students Joseph Carl and Albert Ahronheim.

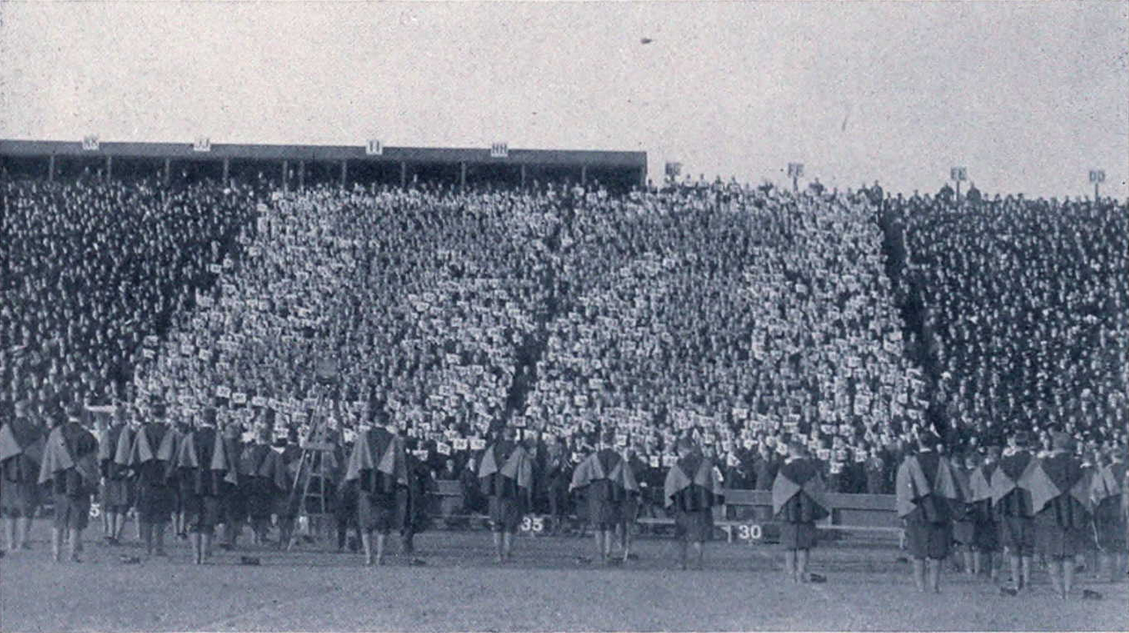
Singing The Yellow and the Blue between halves of the Penn Game, November 1916

Before "The Victors" was officially the university's fight song, the song "There'll Be a Hot Time in the Old Town Tonight" was considered to be the school song. After Michigan temporarily withdrew from the Western Conference in 1907, a new Michigan fight song, "Varsity", was written in 1911 because the line "champions of the West" was no longer appropriate.

=== Accomplishments ===
The Michigan football program ranks first in NCAA history in total wins (1,004 through the end of the 2023 season) and tied for 1st among FBS schools in winning percentage (.734). The team won the first Rose Bowl game in 1902. the university had 40 consecutive winning seasons from 1968 to 2007, including consecutive bowl game appearances from 1975 to 2007. The Wolverines have won a record 45 Big Ten championships. The program claims 12 national championships, most recently winning the 2024 National Championship Game, and has produced three Heisman Trophy winners: Tom Harmon (1940), Desmond Howard (1991), and Charles Woodson (1997). In 2025, the university made history by becoming the first institution in intercollegiate sports to have first-round draft picks in all five major professional sports leagues (NFL, NBA, NHL, MLB, and MLS) within the same year.

The men's ice hockey team, which plays at Yost Ice Arena, has won nine national championships.

The men's basketball team, which plays at the Crisler Center, has appeared in nine Final Fours, winning the 1989 national championship and the 2026 national championship. The program also voluntarily vacated victories from its 1992–1993 and 1995–1999 seasons in which illicit payments to players took place, as well as its 1992 and 1993 Final Four appearances. The men's basketball team has most recently won back-to-back Big Ten Tournament Championships.

More than 250 Michigan athletes or coaches have participated in Olympic events, and as of 2021 its students and alumni have won 155 Olympic medals. Through the 2012 Summer Olympics, 275 Michigan students and coaches had participated in the Olympics, winning medals in each Summer Olympic Games except 1896, and winning gold medals in all but four Olympiads. the university's students/student-coaches (e.g., notably, Michael Phelps) have won a total of 185 Olympic medals: 85 golds, 48 silvers, and 52 bronzes.

In 10 of the past 14 years concluding in 2009, the university has finished in the top five of the NACDA Director's Cup, a ranking compiled by the National Association of Collegiate Directors of Athletics to tabulate the success of universities in competitive sports. The university has finished in the top 10 of the Directors' Cup standings in 21 of the award's 29 seasons between 1993 and 2021, and has placed in the top six in nine of the last 10 seasons.

== Notable people ==
=== Benefactors ===
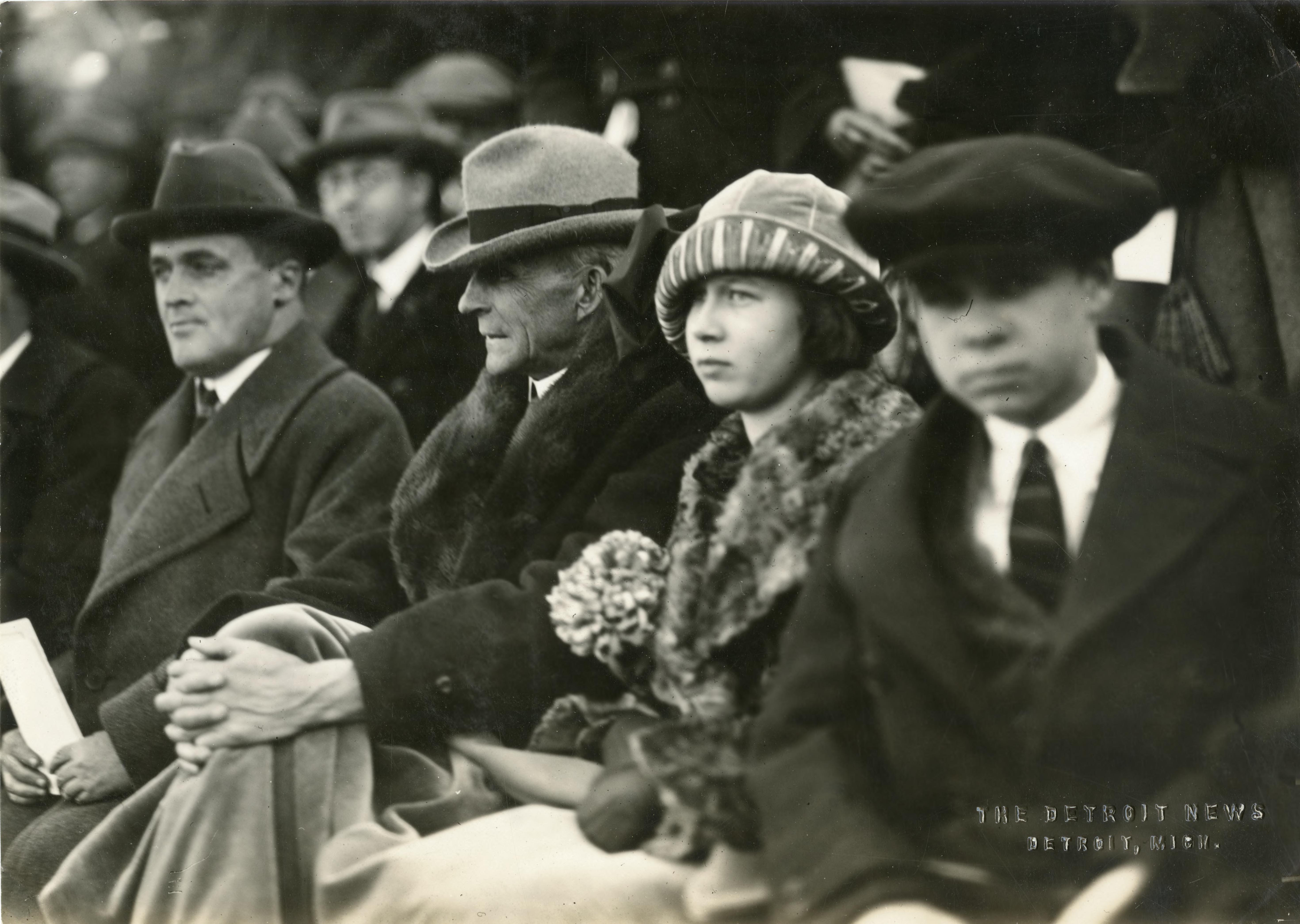
Henry Ford (second from the left) at the dedication of Yost Field House in 1923

The university received significant assistance in its formation during the 1810s from the Freemason Zion Lodge of Detroit, which provided much-needed financial support for its establishment. Of the total amount subscribed to start the university, two-thirds came from the Masonic lodge and its members. Notably, the Campau family, led by Joseph Campau (1769–1863) and his nephew John R. Williams (1782–1854), who was the first mayor of Detroit under the 1824 charter and whose family members were often referred to as the "Barons of Detroit", made substantial donations toward the construction of the university's first building.

Other families that contributed to the university include the Ford, Nichols, Marsal, and Tisch families. Additionally, the Zell Family Foundation and the Li Ka Shing Foundation, based in Hong Kong, are also listed among the donors. Among the individuals who have made significant donations commemorated at the university are William Wilson Cook, Dexter Mason Ferry, William Erastus Upjohn, John Stoughton Newberry, Clara Harrison Stranahan, William K. Brehm, William Morse Davidson, A. Alfred Taubman, Penny W. Stamps, Stephen M. Ross, Charles Munger, and Ronald Weiser.

=== Faculty ===
The university employs 8,189 faculty members, of whom 3,195 are tenured or on a tenure track. Among them, there are 37 members of the National Academy of Sciences, 62 members of the National Academy of Medicine, 30 members of the National Academy of Engineering, 89 Sloan Research Fellows, 17 Guggenheim Fellows, 99 members of the American Academy of Arts and Sciences, and 17 members of the American Philosophical Society. The university's current and former faculty includes fourteen Nobel laureates, eight Pulitzer Prize winners, three David M. Holland Medal winners, one John Bates Clark Medal recipient, and one Dan David Prize recipient.

Current faculty include physicists Mark Newman, Duncan G. Steel, Steven Cundiff, Stephen Forrest, and Gordon Kane; mathematicians Hyman Bass, Sergey Fomin, William Fulton, Robert Griess, and Melvin Hochster; chemist Melanie Sanford; Pulitzer Prize-winning historian Heather Ann Thompson; National Medal of Science recipients Huda Akil and Robert Axelrod; biostatistician Gonçalo Abecasis; philosophers Elizabeth S. Anderson, Allan Gibbard, and Peter Railton; and social psychologist Richard E. Nisbett. The faculty also includes feminist legal theorist Catharine MacKinnon, Strict Scrutiny co-host Leah Litman, engineer James P. Bagian, and A. Galip Ulsoy, co-inventor of the reconfigurable manufacturing system.

Notable faculty in physics have included Donald A. Glaser, the inventor of the bubble chamber; Samuel Goudsmit and George Uhlenbeck, discoverers of electron spin; Kazimierz Fajans, co-discoverer of protactinium; Peter Franken, who first demonstrated the second-harmonic generation; Juris Upatnieks and Emmett Leith, inventors of 3D holography; Gérard Mourou, inventor of chirped pulse amplification; and H. Richard Crane, who was called "one of the most distinguished experimental physicists of the 20th century". Wolfgang Pauli, a pioneer of quantum physics, served as a visiting professor at the university in 1931 and again in 1941. Physicists Martin Lewis Perl and Lawrence W. Jones served as co-advisors to Nobel laureate Samuel C. C. Ting at the university. Perl himself was also awarded the Nobel Prize in Physics in 1995 for his discovery of the tau lepton. Other distinguished physicists who have served on the faculty include Martinus Veltman, Carl Wieman, and Ernest Courant. Notable mathematicians Raoul Bott, Richard Brauer, Samuel Eilenberg (co-founder of category theory), Frederick Gehring, Herman Goldstine, and Anatol Rapoport have all served on the faculty.

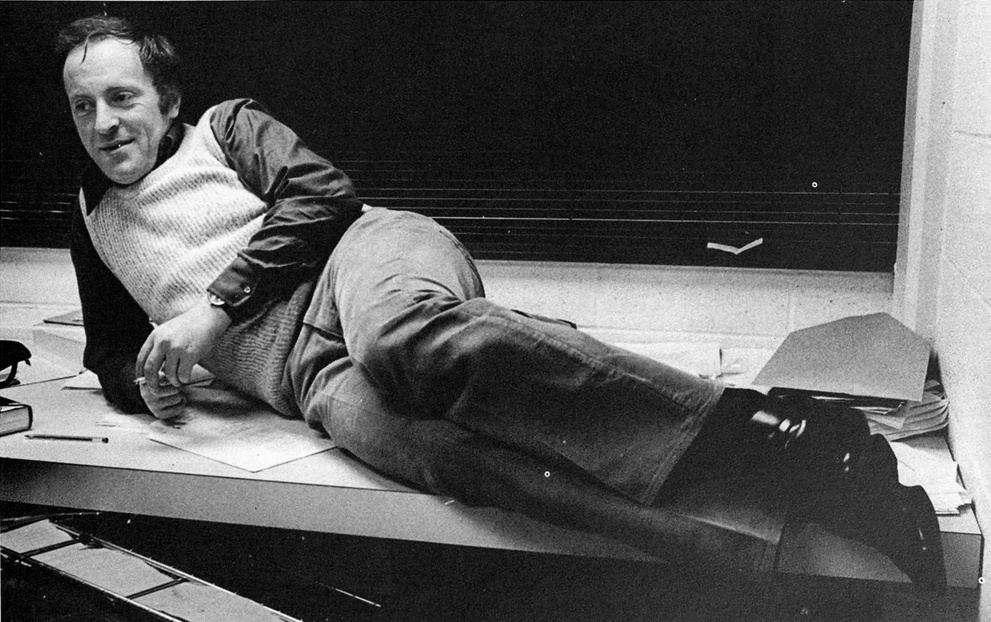
Photograph of Joseph Brodsky teaching at the University of Michigan

Philosophers who were members of the faculty include pragmatists John Dewey, Charles Horton Cooley, and George H. Mead, along with analytic philosophers William Frankena and Cooper Harold Langford. The faculty included notable writers such as Nobel Prize-winning essayist Joseph Brodsky, Pulitzer Prize-winning poet W. H. Auden, and Robert Frost, the only poet to receive four Pulitzer Prizes for Poetry.

In medicine, notable individuals who have served on the faculty include the former director of the National Institutes of Health Francis Collins, the developer of the polio vaccine Jonas Salk, Nobel Prize–winning physiologist Charles B. Huggins, co-discoverer of tumour-inducing viruses Peyton Rous, geneticist James V. Neel, neuroanatomist Elizabeth C. Crosby, and co-discoverer of restriction enzymes Hamilton O. Smith.

Past faculty have also included "the founding father of 21st-century sociology" Charles Tilly, social psychologist Robert Zajonc, chemical engineer Donald L. Katz, Supreme Court justice Henry Billings Brown, Pulitzer Prize-winning composer Leslie Bassett, Pulitzer Prize-winning photographer David C. Turnley, Nobel Prize-winning economist Lawrence R. Klein, and John Bates Clark Medal recipient Kenneth E. Boulding.

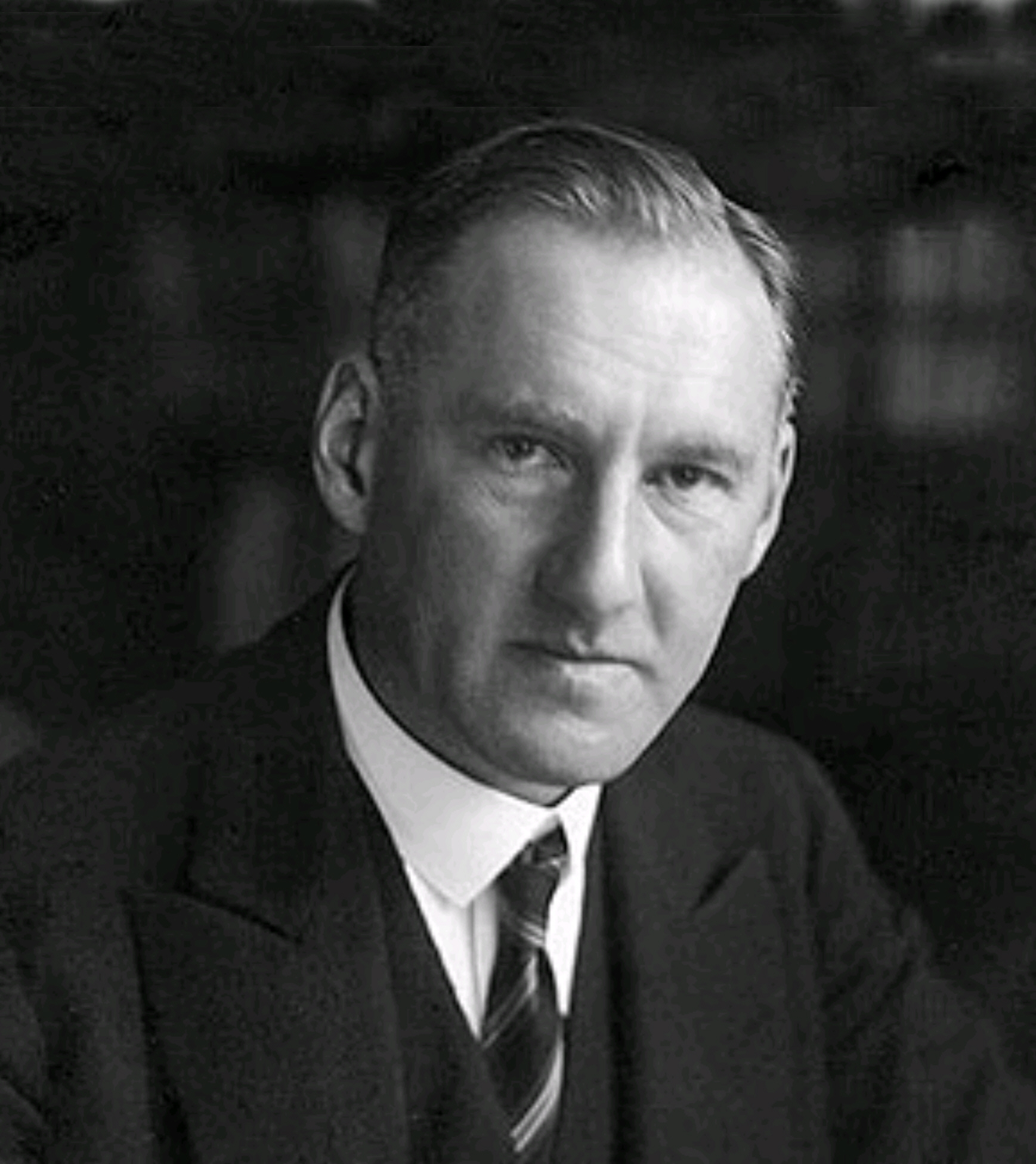
Kazimierz Fajans

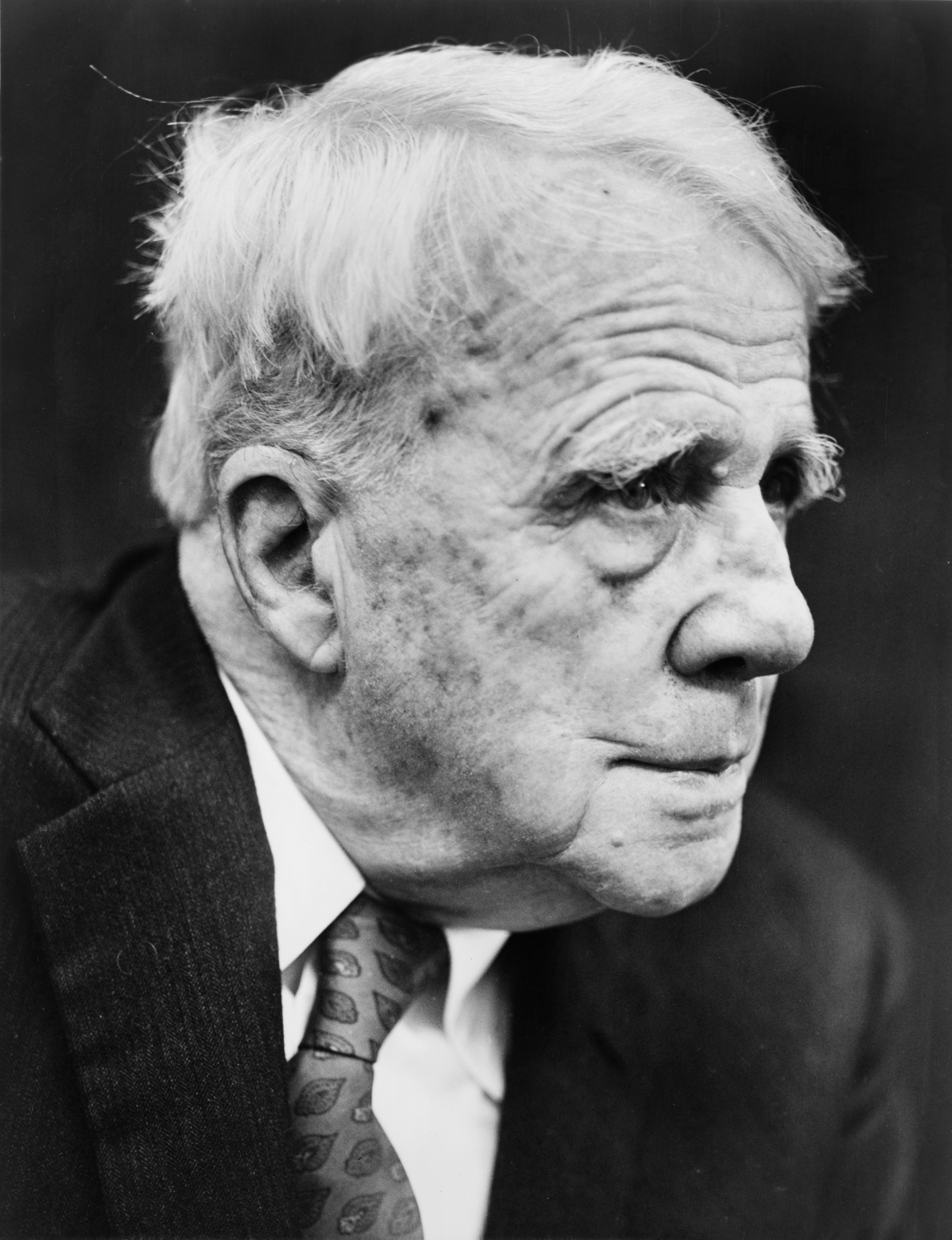
Robert Frost

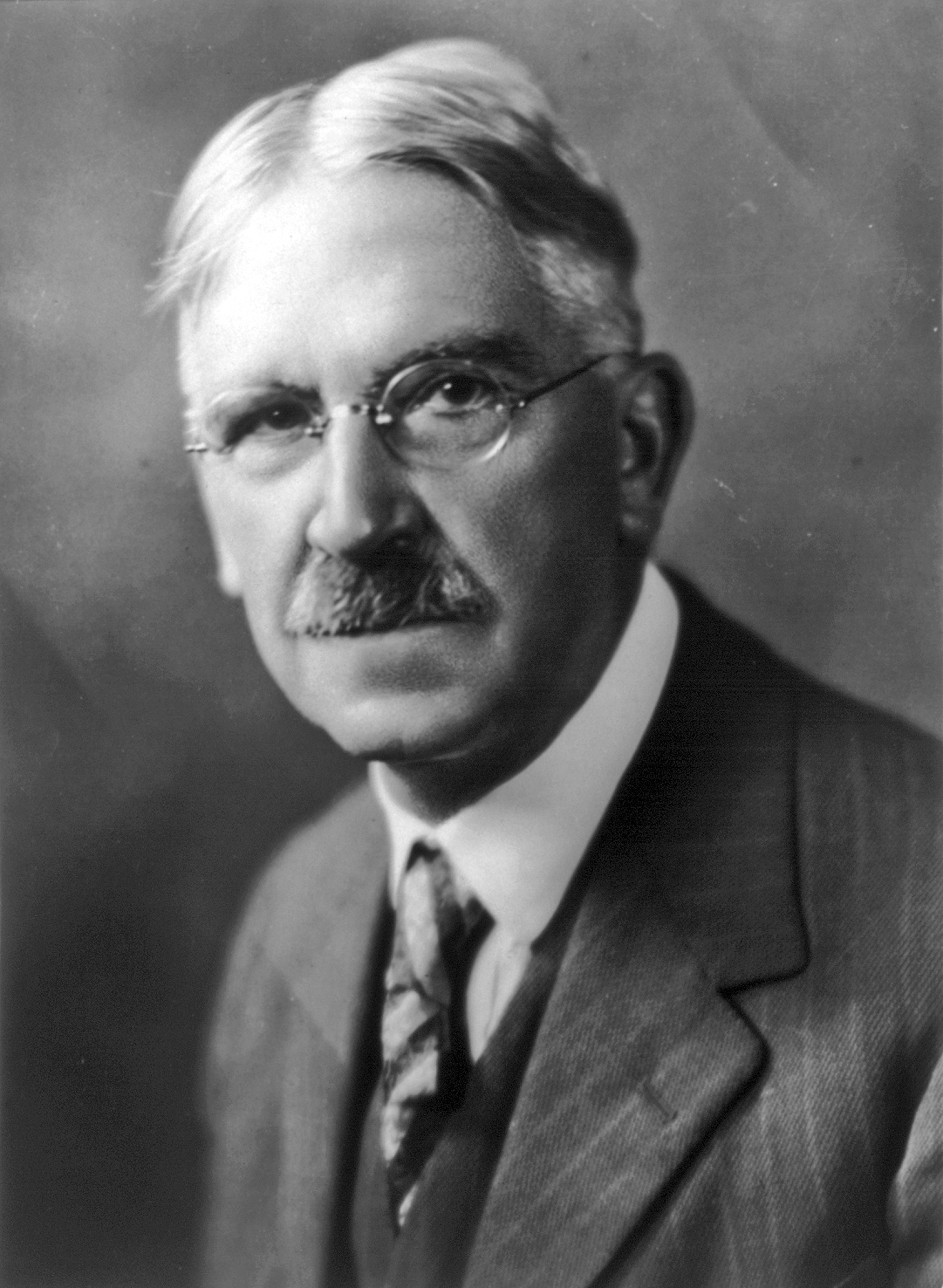
John Dewey

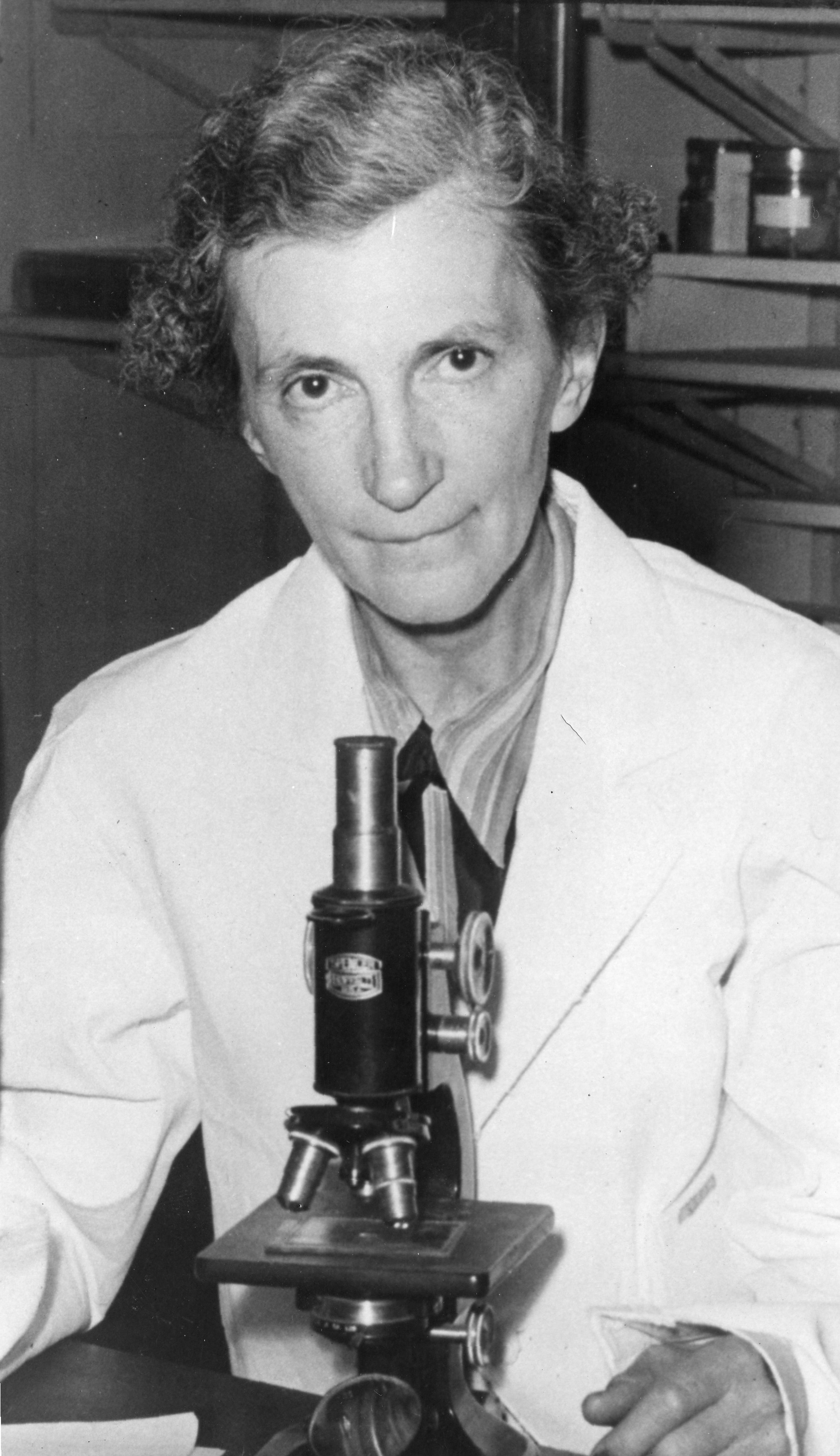
Elizabeth C. Crosby

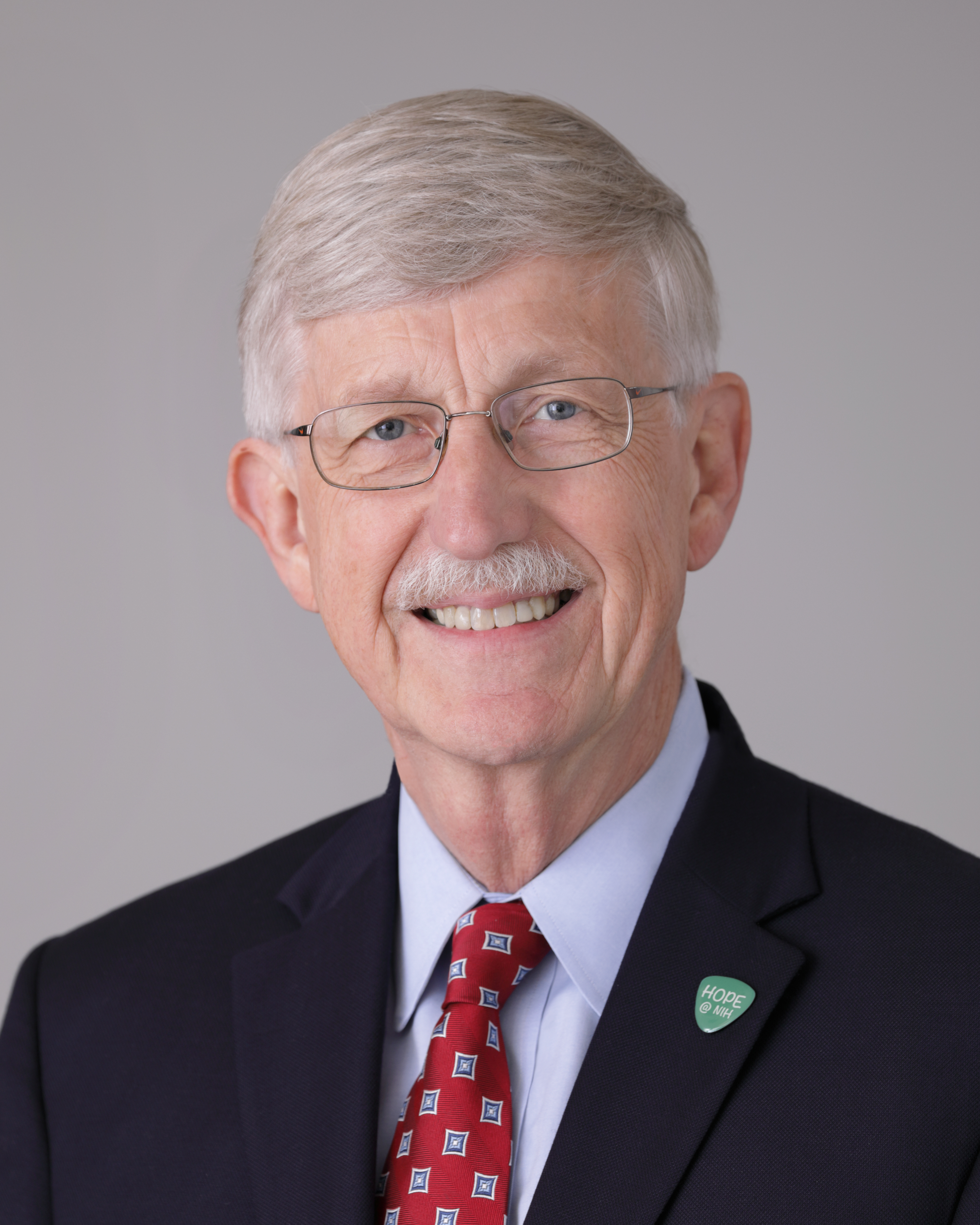
Francis Collins

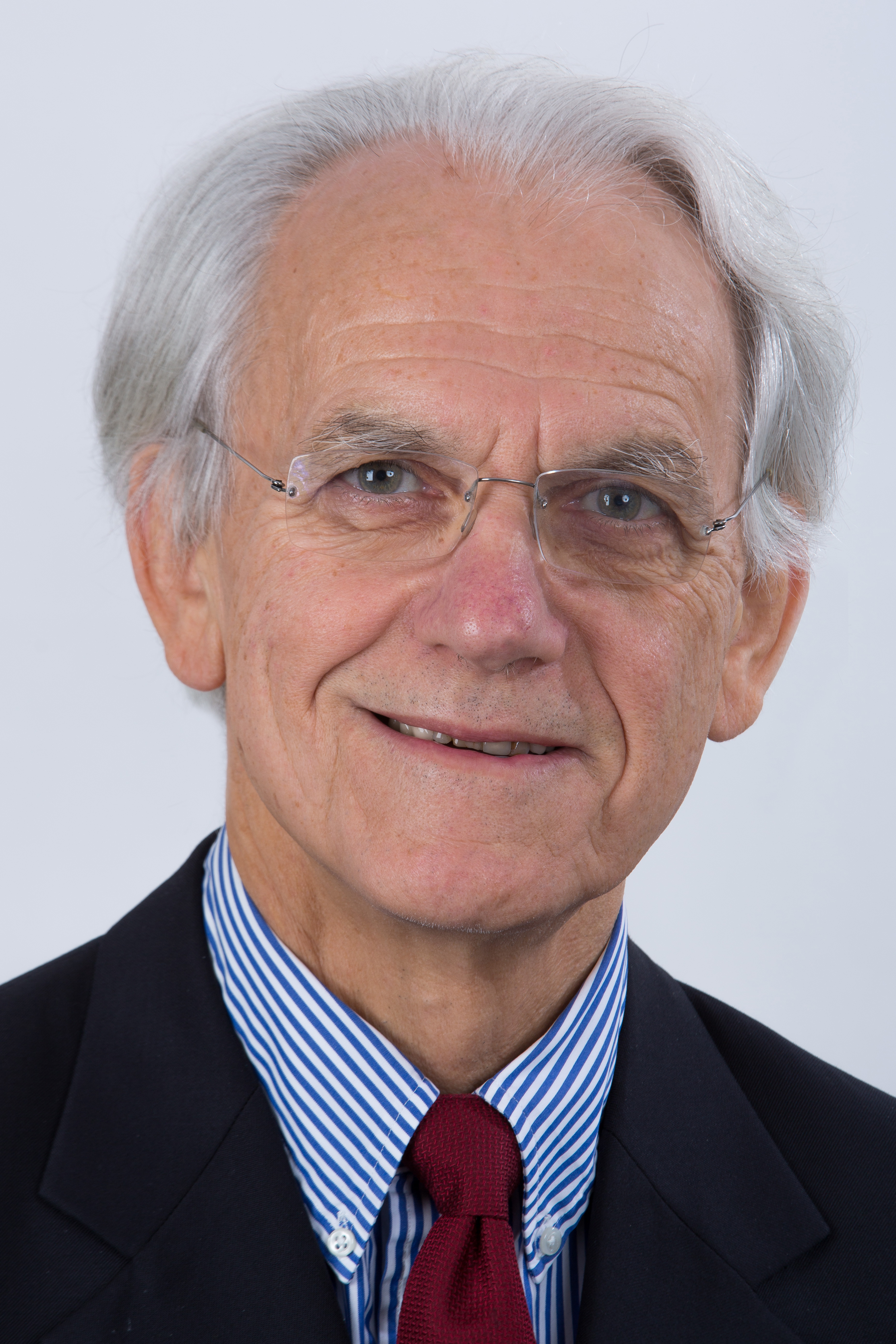
Gérard Mourou

=== Alumni ===
Michigan alumni include nine Nobel laureates, two Abel Prize winners (Isadore M. Singer and Karen Uhlenbeck), two Fields Medalists (June Huh and Stephen Smale), five Turing Award winners, and 35 Pulitzer Prize winners. By alumni count, Michigan ranks fifth as of 2018, among all universities whose alumni have won Pulitzers.

==== Mathematics and sciences ====
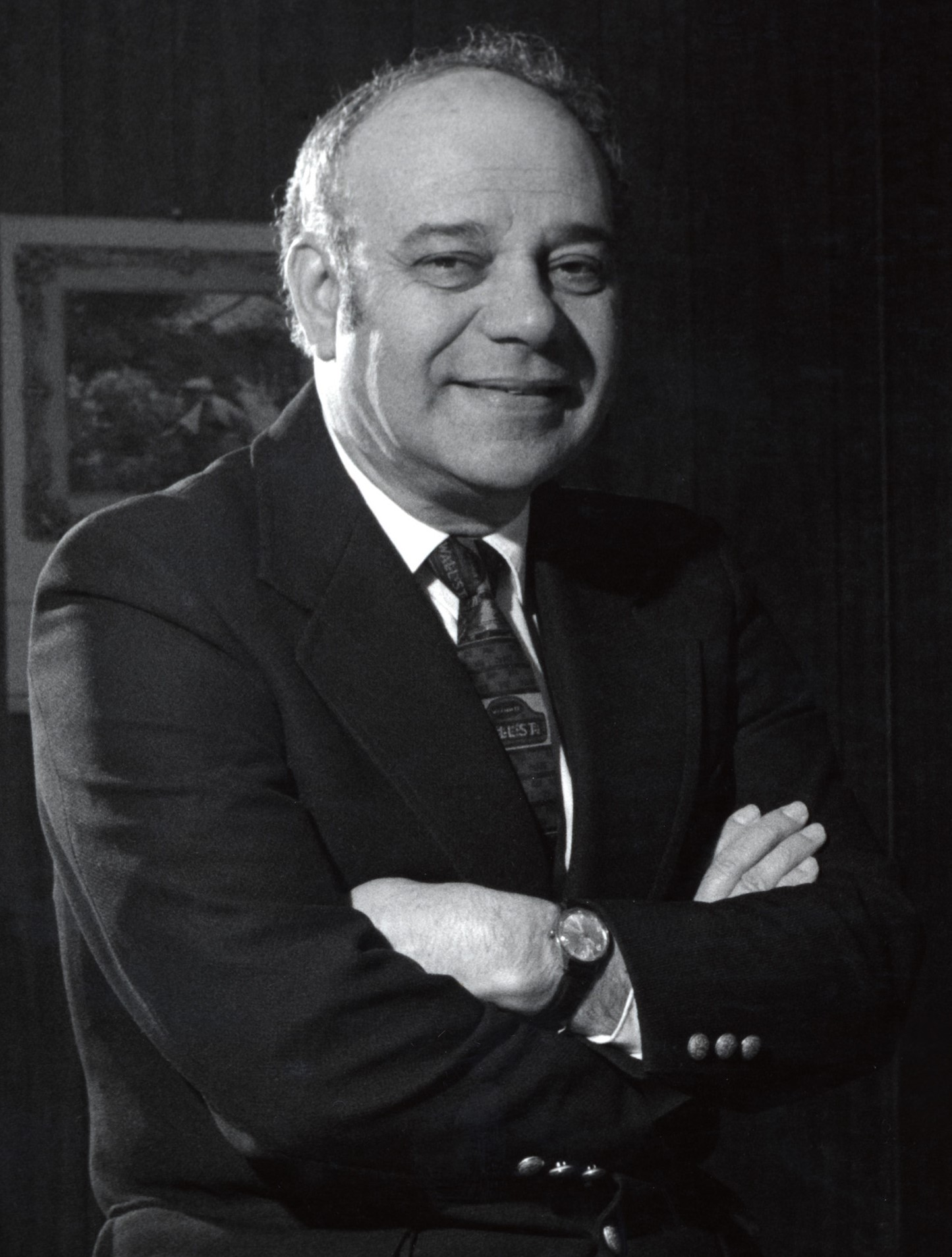
Jerome Karle, Ph.D. '43

Claude Shannon, BS '36, who laid the foundations of the Information Age, ranks among the most distinguished mathematicians from the university. Two Fields medalists Stephen Smale, PhD '56, and June Huh, PhD '14, both completed their Ph.D.s in Mathematics at Michigan. Isadore Singer, BS '44, the Abel Prize-winning mathematician who helped prove the Atiyah–Singer index theorem, studied physics at the university during World War II. Karen Uhlenbeck, BS '64, the first woman to win the Abel Prize, received her bachelor's degree from the university in 1964. Other mathematicians from the university include Kenneth Ira Appel, PhD '59, who, along with Wolfgang Haken, solved the famous Four Color Theorem; Leonard Jimmie Savage, PhD '41, who was known for his contributions to Bayesian statistics and decision theory; and Carl R. de Boor, PhD '66, a renowned mathematician in numerical analysis.

In physics, Nobel laureate Samuel C. C. Ting, PhD '62, who discovered the J/ψ particle, studied under Martin Lewis Perl, another Nobel-winning physicist who discovered the tau lepton, at the university. Theoretical physicist Elmer Imes, PhD '18, who demonstrated the application of quantum theory to the rotational energy of molecules, was the second African American to earn a PhD in physics. Chemist Jerome Karle, PhD '43, who revealed molecular structures, completed his PhD in Physics at Michigan in 1943. His wife, Isabella Karle, PhD '43, an alumna, developed techniques to extract plutonium chloride from plutonium oxide mixtures. Other alumni include nuclear physicist Robert Bacher, PhD '30, a leader of the Manhattan Project; Moses Gomberg, PhD 1894, a pioneer in radical chemistry.

Alumni in biology and medicine include Marshall Warren Nirenberg, PhD '57, famous for breaking the genetic code, who received his PhD in biochemistry from the university in 1957, and Nobel laureate Stanley Cohen, PhD '48, who discovered growth factors. Other alumni include cardiologist Frank Norman Wilson, MD '13; bacteriologist Frederick George Novy, MD 1891; biologist Raymond Pearl, PhD '02; and David Botstein, PhD '67, a leader of the Human Genome Project.

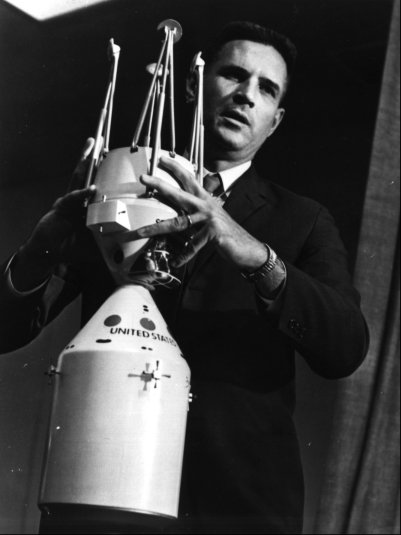
Joseph Francis Shea, Ph.D. '55

Other notable alumni in science include Edgar F. Codd, PhD '65, who developed the relational model of data and completed his PhD at Michigan, and computer scientist Michael Stonebraker, PhD '71, who also made contributions to database research. Both Codd and Stonebraker are Turing Award winners.

==== Engineering and technology ====
Many alumni have made significant contributions to the fields of engineering and technology, including Joseph Francis Shea, PhD '55, a key figure in the Apollo program, and aeronautical engineer Kelly Johnson, MS '33. The university produced numerous developers and original authors of widely recognized software programs, including Niels Provos, PhD '03, the creator of Bcrypt, and Thomas Knoll, MSE '84, the original author of Adobe Photoshop.

Several NASA astronauts attended Michigan including the all-Michigan crews of both Gemini 4, and Apollo 15. NASA astronaut Andre Douglas, MS '12, a member of the Artemis program, completed master's degrees in mechanical engineering and naval architecture and marine engineering from the university in 2012.

Starting in 1958, Willie Hobbs Moore made a mark at the university when she became the first African-American woman to earn a Bachelor of Science degree in electrical engineering at the university. Moore continued her studies, and in 1961 she became the first African-American woman to earn a Master of Science in electrical engineering at the university. The following decade, Moore became the first African-American woman in the nation to earn a Ph.D. degree in physics when she graduated for the third time from U-M in 1972.

==== Economics and business ====
Notable economists who graduated from the university include Nobel laureates Paul Milgrom, BA '70, and Robert J. Shiller, BA '67; government policymakers including former Vice Chair of the Federal Reserve Donald Kohn, PhD '71, and former chairman of the Council of Economic Advisers Gardner Ackley, PhD '40; financial analysts Diane Swonk, MA '85, and Peter Borish, MPP '82; labor and public policy economists David A. Jaeger, PhD '95, Patrick Kline, PhD '07, Maria Cancian, PhD '93, W. Steven Barnett, PhD '81, and Karl D. Gregory, PhD '62; trade and environmental economists Robert W. Staiger, PhD '85, and Eban Goodstein, PhD '89; and survey researchers Rensis Likert, BA '26, and Joanne Hsu, PhD '11.

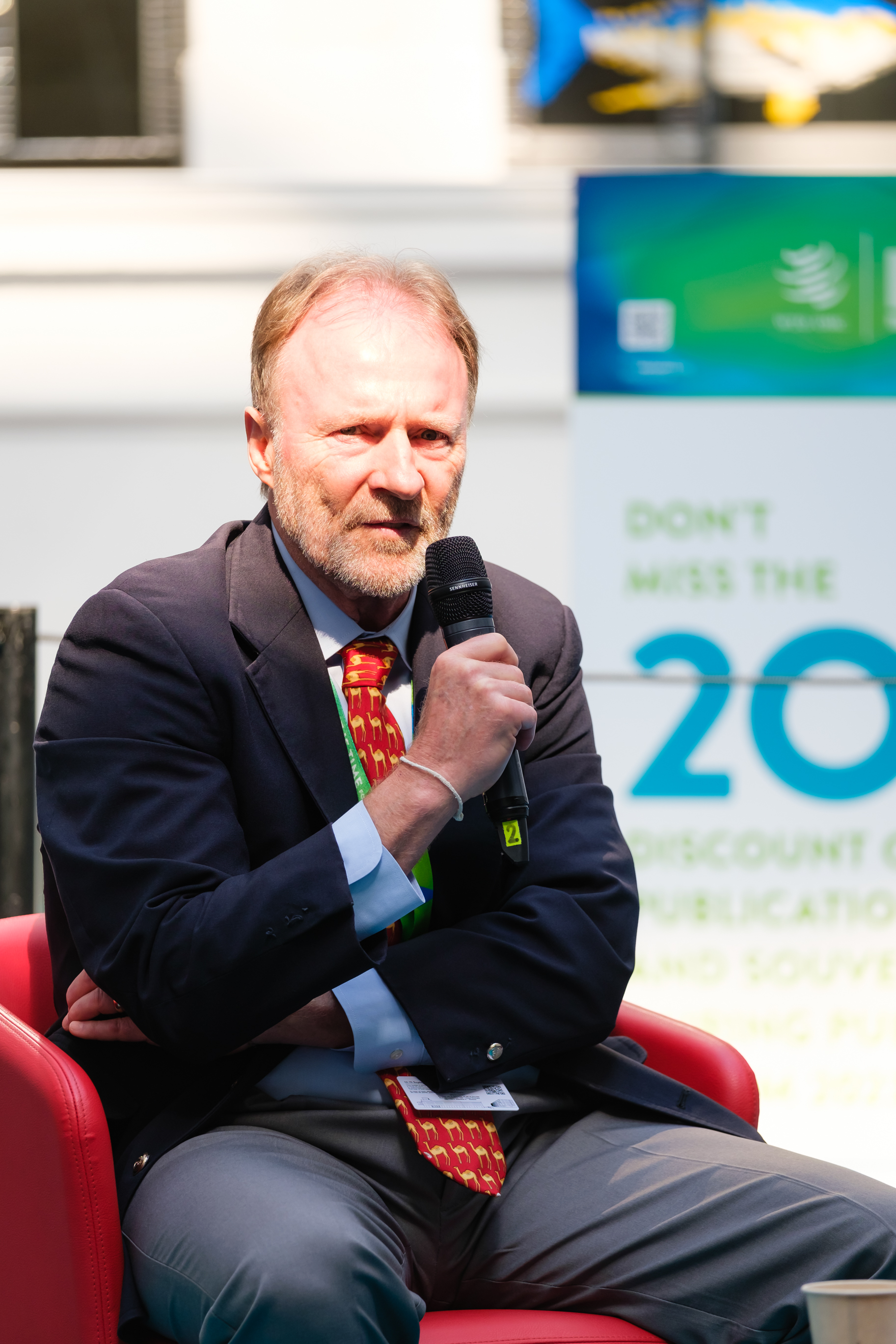
Robert W. Staiger, Ph.D. '85

Michigan alumni have founded or cofounded many prominent companies, such as Alphabet Inc. (Larry Page), Johnson & Johnson (Edward Mead Johnson), Abbott Laboratories (Wallace Calvin Abbott), Stryker Corporation (Homer Stryker), Emerson Electric Company (John Wesley Emerson), Loews Corporation (Preston Robert Tisch), Mayo Clinic (William James Mayo), Devon Energy (J. Larry Nichols), Merrill Lynch (Charles Edward Merrill), Leidos as SAIC (J. Robert Beyster), Illumina (David R. Walt), Twilio (Jeff Lawson, Evan Cooke, John Wolthuis), H&R Block (Henry W. Bloch), Admiral Group (Henry Engelhardt), and Akamai Technologies (Randall Kaplan).

The university counts several patriarchs of influential business dynasties, including George Getty of the renowned Getty family. The university also boasts a number of graduates from affluent families, including heirs and heiresses to major fortunes, such as Josiah K. Lilly Jr. (heir to Eli Lilly and Company); Charles Rudolph Walgreen Jr. (heir to Walgreens); John Gideon Searle (heir to G. D. Searle); Doug Meijer and Hank Meijer (heirs to Meijer); Christopher Ilitch (heir to Ilitch Holdings, Inc.); and Kenneth B. Dart (heir to Dart Container Corporation). Raoul Wallenberg, a member of the prominent Wallenberg family, one of the wealthiest families in the world, studied at the university in 1931.

As of May 2024, about 2.8% of all Fortune 1000 executives with MBAs are alumni from Michigan Ross, ranking it as the 6th highest among all business schools in the United States. Alumni have led several companies, including Berkshire Hathaway (Charlie Munger), Ford (James Hackett), General Motors (Roger Smith, Frederick Henderson, and Richard C. Gerstenberg), State Farm Insurance (Jon Farney), Citigroup (John C. Dugan), Tencent (Martin Lau), The Boeing Company (Edgar Gott), Wells Fargo (Timothy J. Sloan), Allstate Corp. (Thomas J. Wilson), PNC Financial Services (William S. Demchak), General Mills (Stephen Sanger), International Paper (John V. Faraci), KB Financial Group (Euh Yoon-dae), Chrysler Group LLC (C. Robert Kidder), BorgWarner Inc. (Timothy M. Manganello), Bunzl (Michael Roney), and Celanese (David N. Weidman).

==== Literature, music and theatre ====
Notable alumni in the arts include Academy Award-nominated actress Selma Blair, BFA '94 and Emmy Award-winning actor Darren Criss, BFA '09. The university's musical theatre performance program has produced Tony Award winner Gavin Creel, BFA '98, Tony Award winner Celia Keenan-Bolger, BFA '00, and the Oscar, Tony, and Grammy Award-winning composing duo Benj Pasek, BFA '06, and Justin Paul, BFA '06. The institution's graduates also include visual artists Mike Kelley, BFA '76, and Michele Oka Doner, MFA '69, as well as Pulitzer Prize-winning fiction writer Jesmyn Ward, MFA '05.

In literature and journalism, alumni include playwrights Arthur Miller, BA '38, and Lawrence Kasdan, BA '70; journalists Mike Wallace, BA '39, and Daniel Okrent, BA '69; authors Susan Orlean, BA '76, and Brad Meltzer, BA '92; and Pulitzer Prize-winning poet Theodore Roethke, BA '29. Other notable figures in the performing arts who attended the university include actors James Earl Jones, BA '55, and Lucy Liu, BA '90, alongside opera singer Jessye Norman, MM '68.

==== Law and government ====
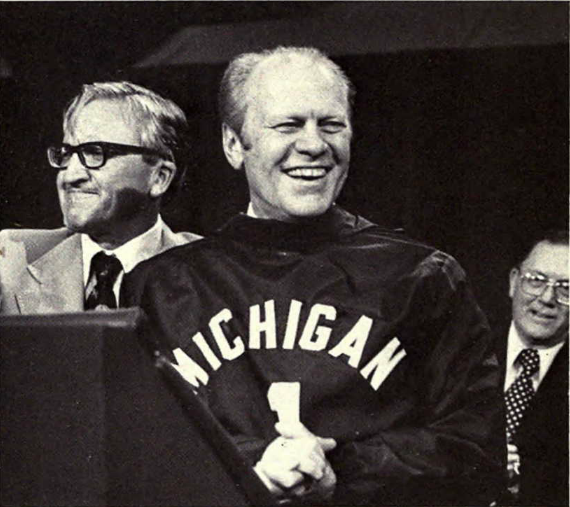
U.S. President Gerald Ford, BA '35, wearing a "Michigan #1" sweater during the kick-off of Ford's 1976 presidential campaign at the University of Michigan's campus in Ann Arbor

The university boasts several holders or candidates of the United States presidency, including Gerald Ford, BA '35, the 38th president and the Republican Party's nominee for president in 1976; Thomas E. Dewey, BA '23, who was the Republican Party's nominee for president in both 1944 and 1948; Arthur LeSueur, LLB 1898, a Socialist candidate for president in 1916; Gilbert Hitchcock, LLB 1881, a Democratic candidate in 1928; Ben Carson, MD '77, a Republican candidate in 2016; and Larry Elder, JD '77, a Republican candidate in 2024. John Worth Kern, LLB 1869, and Burton K. Wheeler, LLB '05, both ran for the vice presidency, with Kern representing the Democratic Party alongside William Jennings Bryan in 1908, and Wheeler as a Progressive Party nominee with Robert La Follette Sr. in 1924.

Among the 23 former governors of Michigan who hold formal college degrees, 10 are graduates of the university. (Woodbridge N. Ferris only attended for a year) As of 2021, the university has matriculated 63 U.S. governors or lieutenant governors, including former Governor of Michigan Rick Snyder, JD '82; first female lieutenant governor of Missouri Harriett Woods, BA '48; and former Governor of California Culbert Olson. More than 250 Michigan graduates have served as legislators as either a United States Senator (48 graduates) or as a Congressional representative (over 215 graduates), including former House Majority Leader Dick Gephardt, BS '62, and U.S. Representative Justin Amash, JD '05. Former Los Angeles Mayor Richard Riordan, former Chicago Mayor Lori Lightfoot, BA '84, and Detroit Mayor Mike Duggan, JD '83, are also Michigan graduates.

Michigan graduates have held a range of cabinet-level positions, including United States Secretary of State (William Rufus Day); United States Secretary of the Treasury (George M. Humphrey); United States Attorney General (Harry Micajah Daugherty); United States Secretary of the Interior (Kenneth Lee Salazar); United States Secretary of Agriculture (Clinton Anderson, Julius Sterling Morton, Arthur M. Hyde, and Dan Glickman); United States Secretary of Commerce (Roy D. Chapin and Robert P. Lamont); United States Secretary of Health and Human Services (Tom Price); and Director of the United States Office of Management and Budget (Rob Portman). Multiple alumni served in the judicial branch of the U.S. government, including William Rufus Day, Frank Murphy, and George Sutherland, all of whom served as Supreme Court justices. As of 2019, the university had placed onto various state supreme courts over 125 graduates, 40 of whom served as chief justice.

Foreign alumni include the Prime Minister of Singapore (Lawrence Wong); the current ruler of the Emirate of Ras Al Khaimah (Saud bin Saqr Al Qasimi); the 51st Prime Minister of Italy (Lamberto Dini); the Prime Minister of Antigua and Barbuda 1994–2004 (Lester Bird); the 47th President of Costa Rica (Luis Guillermo Solís); the Prime Minister of Peru 1993–1994 (Alfonso Bustamante); the Prime Minister of Jordan 2012–2016 (Abdullah Ensour); the 13th President of Pakistan (Arif Alvi); Chief Secretary of Hong Kong 2007–2011 (Henry Tang Ying-yen); Deputy Prime Minister of South Korea 2017–2018 (Kim Dong-yeon); Deputy Prime Minister of Bulgaria in the government of Boyko Borisov (Simeon Djankov); Deputy Prime Minister of Madagascar 1997–1998 (Herizo Razafimahaleo). British Members of Parliament Terry Davis and Howard Flight are also Michigan graduates. As of 2022, Michigan has matriculated 64 ambassadors who have served in more than 72 countries.
