= Dean Jones (academic) =

American biochemist and toxicologist

Dean P. Jones
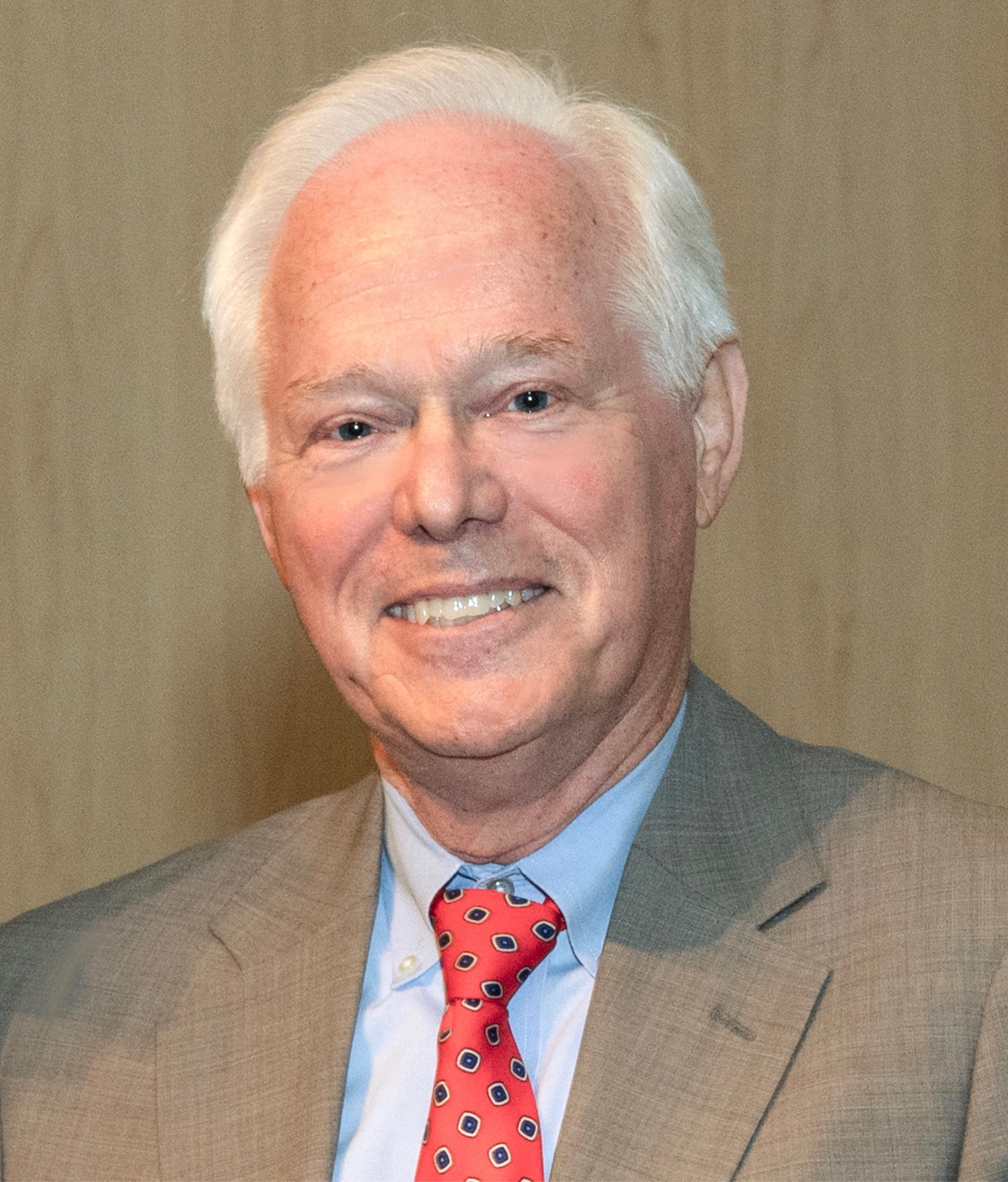
- Born: September 13, 1949 (age 76); Hazard, Kentucky, U.S.
- Citizenship: American
- Education: University of Illinois Urbana-Champaign (B.S., 1971); Oregon Health & Science University (Ph.D., 1976)
- Known for: Thiol/disulfide redox systems, high-resolution metabolomics, exposome research
- Scientific career
- Fields: Biochemistry, Toxicology, Redox biology, Metabolomics, Exposomics
- Workplaces: Emory University School of Medicine

Dean P. Jones (born September 13, 1949) is an American biochemist and toxicologist specialising in redox biology, metabolomics, and exposomics. He is a professor of medicine in the Division of Pulmonary, Allergy, Critical Care and Sleep Medicine at Emory University School of Medicine, where he also serves as director of the Clinical Biomarkers Laboratory. His research has focused on the role of oxidative stress, thiol/disulfide redox systems, mitochondrial mechanisms of cell death, and the application of high-resolution metabolomics to study the exposome.

== Early life and education ==
Jones was born in Hazard, Kentucky. He earned a Bachelor of Science degree with honours in chemistry and biochemistry from the University of Illinois Urbana-Champaign in 1971. He received his Ph.D. in biochemistry from Oregon Health & Science University in 1976.

Jones was awarded a National Science Foundation Postdoctoral Fellowship in nutritional biochemistry at Cornell University from 1976 to 1977.

== Career ==
Jones joined Emory University School of Medicine as an assistant professor of biochemistry in 1979. He was promoted to associate professor in 1985 and to full professor of biochemistry in 1991. In 2003, he was appointed as professor in the Department of Medicine. He holds joint or secondary appointments in the departments of biochemistry, ophthalmology, and paediatrics, as well as the Winship Cancer Institute.

From 1997 to 1998, Jones served as a Nobel Fellow at the Karolinska Institute. He served as director of the Clinical Biomarkers Laboratory since 2003, co-director of the Center for Clinical and Molecular Nutrition since 2002, and director of the Integrated Health Sciences Facility Core for the HERCULES Exposome Research Center from 2011 to 2021.

== Research ==
=== Redox biology and oxidative stress ===
Jones has researched thiol/disulfide redox systems, with a focus on glutathione and thioredoxin. He co-authored a redefinition of oxidative stress and, with Helmut Sies, developed the "Redox Code." His work showed that the plasma cystine-to-glutathione ratio predicts mortality in coronary artery disease patients. In collaboration with Young-Mi Go, he also characterized subcellular redox compartmentalization.

=== Mitochondrial mechanisms of cell death ===
Jones helped establish that Bcl-2 prevents apoptosis by blocking mitochondrial cytochrome c release. His group cloned human mitochondrial thioredoxin-2, showing its role in preventing oxidant-induced apoptosis, and contributed to evidence that the ADP/ATP translocase is not essential for the mitochondrial permeability transition pore.

=== Metabolomics and exposomics ===
Jones developed high-resolution metabolomics methods using Fourier-transform mass spectrometry to profile chemicals in biological samples. His group identified the microbiome-derived metabolite delta-valerobetaine as a diet-dependent obesogen that inhibits fatty acid oxidation and is hydroxylated to form homocarnitine, a carnitine analogue associated with body mass index and cognitive function.

== Awards and honours ==
- Albert E. Levy Faculty Research Award, Emory University (1985)
- R. Wayne Alexander Career Achievement Award (2013)
- Fellow, Society for Redox Biology and Medicine (2019)
- Albert E. Levy Senior Faculty Scientific Research Award (2022)
- Lifetime Achievement Award, UL Research Institutes (2024)

== Selected publications ==
- Yang, J.; Liu, X.; Bhalla, K.; Kim, C.N.; Ibrado, A.M.; Cai, J.; Peng, T.I.; Jones, D.P.; Wang, X. (1997). "Prevention of apoptosis by Bcl-2: release of cytochrome c from mitochondria blocked". Science. 275 (5303): 1129–1132. doi:10.1126/science.275.5303.1129. PMID 9027314.
- Jones, D.P. (2006). "Redefining oxidative stress". Antioxidants & Redox Signaling. 8 (9–10): 1865–1879. doi:10.1089/ars.2006.8.1865. PMID 16987039.
- Sies, H.; Berndt, C.; Jones, D.P. (2017). "Oxidative Stress". Annual Review of Biochemistry. 86: 715–748. doi:10.1146/annurev-biochem-061516-045037. PMID 28441057.
- Sies, H.; Jones, D.P. (2020). "Reactive oxygen species (ROS) as pleiotropic physiological signalling agents". Nature Reviews Molecular Cell Biology. 21 (7): 363–383. doi:10.1038/s41580-020-0230-3. PMID 32231263.
- Liu, K.H.; Owens, J.A.; Saeedi, B. (2021). "Microbial metabolite delta-valerobetaine is a diet-dependent obesogen". Nature Metabolism. 3 (12): 1694–1705. doi:10.1038/s42255-021-00502-8. PMC 8711632. PMID 34931082.
