= Walter J. Curran Jr. =

American Radiation Oncologist

- Citizenship: American
- Education: Medical College of Georgia

Walter "Wally" J. Curran, Jr. (born April 24, 1951) is an American radiation oncologist specializing in the treatment of malignant brain tumors and locally advanced lung cancer.

Curran was named chief of Piedmont Oncology Institute for Piedmont Healthcare in 2023, after serving as the global chief medical officer of GenesisCare. Previously, he was the executive director of Winship Cancer Institute of Emory University and professor and chairman of the Department of Radiation Oncology at Emory University School of Medicine in Atlanta, Georgia.

== Early life and education ==
Curran was born and raised in Beverly, Massachusetts. He graduated with honors from Dartmouth College in Hanover, New Hampshire and received his medical degree from the Medical College of Georgia in Augusta, Georgia. Originally interested in pediatric oncology, he became a radiation oncologist after taking an open slot in a radiation oncology elective at the former Joint Center for Radiation Therapy in Boston, Massachusetts. He completed his residency in the Department of Radiation Therapy at the University of Pennsylvania Medical Center and his internship in internal medicine at Presbyterian University of Pennsylvania Medical Center in Philadelphia, Pennsylvania.

== Career ==
After finishing his medical training, Curran joined the faculty of Fox Chase Cancer Center in Philadelphia. He was then recruited to Thomas Jefferson University in Philadelphia, where he was professor and chair of the Department of Radiation Oncology and clinical director of the Sidney Kimmel Cancer Center from 1994 to 2008.

From 2009 to 2021, Curran was the executive director of Winship Cancer Institute of Emory University and professor and chair of the Department of Radiation Oncology at Emory University School of Medicine in Atlanta. With that appointment, he became the first radiation oncologist to serve as director of a National Cancer Institute-designated cancer center.

In 2015, former President Jimmy Carter named Curran as one of the physicians treating him for metastatic melanoma.

In 2021, Curran was appointed as the global chief medical officer of GenesisCare, a provider of cancer and cardiovascular care. Piedmont Healthcare announced in 2023 that Curran would become the new chief of its Piedmont Oncology Institute in Atlanta starting in January 2024.

Curran served as a group chairman and a principal investigator of NRG Oncology, an international cancer clinical trials network group funded by the National Cancer Institute. He was the founding secretary/treasurer of the Coalition of Cancer Cooperative Groups and a member of the board of directors of the American Society of Clinical Oncology. He also served on the board of the Georgia Center for Oncology Research and Education (Georgia CORE).

In his research, Curran has led several landmark clinical and translational trials and is responsible for developing a universally adopted staging system for patients with malignant glioma.

== Honors and awards ==
Curran is a fellow of the American College of Radiology and the American Society of Clinical Oncology and has been awarded honorary memberships in the European Society of Therapeutic Radiology and Oncology and the Canadian Association of Radiation Oncology. The Blue Ridge Institute for Medical Research listed Curran among the top 20 principal investigators in terms of overall National Institutes of Health funding in 2012 and 2013, first in the state of Georgia, and first among cancer center directors. He was named a Georgia Research Alliance Eminent Scholar and Chair in Cancer Research in 2013. He received the Gold Medal Award from the American Society for Radiation Oncology in 2019.

== Personal life ==
Curran lives in Atlanta, Georgia, with his wife, Laura Palickar, and children. An avid runner, he is an age-competitive middle distance racer.
