= Hill and Barlow =

Defunct American law firm

Hill & Barlow was a law firm in Boston, Massachusetts that was dissolved on December 7, 2002 after 106 years of business. Founded in 1899, the firm had been one of the city's oldest and most elite firms, and was also the 12th largest in Boston at the time of its dissolution, employing 138 lawyers.

== History ==
The firm was founded by Arthur D. Hill, known for defending the anarchists Sacco and Vanzetti. Hill began his practice in 1895 and joined forces in 1899 with Robert Homans and Robert Barlow to form Hill & Barlow.

During the McCarthy era of the early 1950s, H&B attorneys John Saltonstall and Calvin Bartlett defended individuals accused by McCarthy's House on UnAmerican Activities in a time when other firms refused to do so.

By 1965, the firm, now called Hill Barlow Goodale & Adams, had 11 partners and 7-8 associates. In this same year, Hill Barlow Goodale & Adams merged with Peabody Koufman & Brewer and changed the firm name to Hill & Barlow. This was the first merger in Boston in 30 years and created one of the largest firms in the city with 31 lawyers.

The firm was incorporated in the early 1990s, meaning that employees could enjoy the tax benefits available to employees of a corporation. By this time, H&B had grown to 123 lawyers and was considered a mid-size firm.

Prior to its dissolution in 2002, Hill & Barlow attempted to prevent liquidation by focussing more on individual practice groups and cutting back on staff.

A group representing authors and movie producers were the first to leave for Fish & Richardson in January 2002. Yet, the final blow to Hill & Barlow occurred on December 6, 2002 when approximately 23 lawyers, one third of the firm, left in 2003 to eventually join Piper Rudnick (now DLA Piper). These 23 individuals primarily comprised the real estate sector of the firm (that generated 30 percent of the firm's revenue), Elliot Surkin, a real estate attorney who served 35 years at the firm commented to the press: "We didn't have confidence in going forward. The firm [Hill & Barlow] should dissolve. I saw it happening over the years. The firm was not operating successfully. Five or 10 years ago it could have done something." Surkin was later announced as managing partner of Piper Rudnick's new Boston office. The sudden departure of the real estate attorneys was catastrophic to Hill and Barlow due to the firm's reputation for representing complex equity and mortgage cases for development projects.

Remaining attorneys reported feeling "blindsided" by the unexpected upheaval, but those departing felt that the planned restructuring was coming too late.

== Attorney compensation ==
One of the main gripes that dissatisfied staff had with H&B was economics and compensation. By the late 1980s and '90s, the real estate sector of the firm had become by far the most lucrative practice. Many real estate litigators on staff felt that they were carrying the firm's economic viability; thus being unfairly compensated (the same as less-lucrative attorneys and sectors within the practice).

From 1965 until 1999, H&B used a formula system administered by an autonomous compensation committee. In the mid 1980s, the firm attempted to minimize the disparity between the top producing partners from the bottom by taking out 20% of the profit and distributing it as rewards for service or for need. In the 1990s, additional compensation was distributed based on one’s contribution to the firm, i.e. managing partner role etc. Whatever portion of the 20% was not allocated by need or service was equally distributed among the partners.

In 1999, the firm adopted a judgment system of compensation. The management committee became fully responsible for distributing the profits, and decisions regarding distribution were made in advance and paid at the beginning of the year rather than a calculation of a three year average paid in December.

== Notable alumni ==
Notable alumni of the firm include:

- David Alan Hoffman, John H. Watson, Jr. Lecturer on Law at Harvard Law School
- Robert Mueller, director of the Federal Bureau of Investigation
- Michael S. Greco, President of the American Bar Association, the Massachusetts Bar Association, the New England Bar Association, and the New England Bar Foundation
- Former Massachusetts governors Endicott Peabody, Michael Dukakis and William Weld
- Deval Patrick, the first African American Governor of Massachusetts and former U.S. assistant attorney general for Civil Rights under Bill Clinton
- Former federal district court judge Reginald C. Lindsay of the District of Massachusetts
- Former Massachusetts State Senator Jarrett Barrios
- John A. E. Pottow, professor of law at the University of Michigan Law School
- Herbert P. Gleason, former corporation counsel of Boston
- Richard W. Renehan, President of the Boston Bar Association, President of Boston College Alumni
- Jonathan C. Lipson, professor of law at Temple University-Beasley School of Law
