= John A. E. Pottow =

Law professor

John Anthony Edwards Pottow is the John Philip Dawson Collegiate Professor of Law at the University of Michigan Law School, specializing in international commercial law, bankruptcy and consumer finance. In addition to scholarship, Pottow is known for pro bono work and has argued pro bono cases before the United States Supreme Court and several United States Courts of Appeals, winning an award for pro bono service. His public service in international trade law includes service on the United States Delegation to the United Nations Commission on International Trade Law (UNCITRAL) and the State Department's Advisory Committee on Private International Law.

== Early life and education ==
Pottow was born in Canada. He graduated from Upper Canada College in 1989. He received an A.B. summa cum laude in psychology, Phi Beta Kappa, from Harvard College in 1993, While at Harvard, Pottow received the John Harvard Annual Scholarship all four years, and was awarded the Gordon Allport Prize in Psychology and the Thomas T. Hoopes, Class of 1919, Prize. Pottow also hosted a jazz program on WHRB-FM, and was a member of the Hasty Pudding Theatricals group and crew team and student conductor of the Harvard University Band. As a freshman, Pottow attended the last lecture ever delivered by B. F. Skinner. Pottow was interested in psycholinguistics and studied under social psychologist Roger Brown, who encouraged Pottow to pursue the practice of law. He was also a student under professor Elizabeth Warren, which later developed into a professional collaboration.

From 1993 to 1994, Pottow worked at Eos Partners, LP, a private equity hedge fund in New York, as chief financial officer.

Pottow earned his J.D. magna cum laude from Harvard Law School, where he was treasurer of the Harvard Law Review, in 1997. At Harvard Law School, Pottow was a National Scholar. Between his first and second years of law school, Pottow was a research assistant to Professor Arthur R. Miller on the supplement to Federal Practice and Procedure, co-authored by Miller, Charles Alan Wright, and Edward H. Cooper.

== Career ==
Pottow served as a law clerk to Judge Guido Calabresi of the U.S. Court of Appeals for the Second Circuit from 1997 to 1998 and to Chief Justice Beverley McLachlin of the Supreme Court of Canada from 1998 to 1999. Pottow entered private practice, first as a litigation associate at Hill & Barlow in Boston from 1999 to 2002, and then as of counsel at Weil, Gotshal & Manges in New York from 2002 to 2003.

Pottow joined the Michigan Law faculty in 2003 and received tenure in 2008. At Michigan, Pottow has taught international bankruptcy, bankruptcy, contracts, secured transactions, law and economics and other business courses, and served as the project director of the National Consumer Bankruptcy Project. Pottow has testified before congressional committees several times. In 2009, Pottow, Steven P. Croley, and Eric Posner were commissioned by the Troubled Asset Relief Program Congressional Oversight Panel to provide outside legal opinions on the Home Affordable Modification Program (HAMP) and TARP.

Pottow has written on the "stickiness of default rules," on elder bankruptcy, and on the effects of the Bankruptcy Abuse Prevention and Consumer Protection Act of 2005, which significantly revised the U.S. Bankruptcy Code. He has critiqued the nondischargeability of student loan debt in personal bankruptcy proceedings. Pottow has also written extensively on international business law issues. He was elected to the International Insolvency Institute in 2010 and won the Institute's first annual prize for international insolvency research.

Pottow co-authors a leading bankruptcy textbook, The Law of Debtors and Creditors (8th edition, Wolters Kluwer 2021), along with Elizabeth Warren, Jay Lawrence Westbrook, and Katie Porter. His pro bono litigation includes the successful representation of the respondent in Executive Benefits Insurance Agency, Inc. v. Arkison before the Supreme Court of the United States.

Pottow has provided commentary on legal issues in a variety of forums including New York Times, USA Today, and NPR. He has been an expert witness in several commercial law cases. He is a member of the American Bankruptcy Institute and is a member of the American Bankruptcy Institute Law Review advisory board. He won the 2005 L. Hart Wright Award for Excellence in Teaching at Michigan in 2005. Pottow was a visiting professor at Harvard in fall 2008.

Pottow was admitted to the bar in Massachusetts (in 1999) and Michigan (in 2011). He is also a licensed barrister and solicitor in Ontario.

Pottow is an occasional contributor to Credit Slips, a scholarly blog on credit, finance, and bankruptcy.

Pottow is an elected member of American Law Institute, American College of Bankruptcy, and International Insolvency Institute.

== Personal life ==
Pottow is married to Reshma Jagsi, a radiation oncologist and professor at the University of Michigan Medical School; they have two children. Pottow holds American, Canadian, and European Union citizenship.

Pottow is a political independent. He speaks American Sign Language and French.
