= Civil Rights Litigation Clearinghouse =

Website that provides searchable litigation resource

- Formation: 2005
- Type: NGO
- Purpose: Online library
- Location: Ann Arbor, MI
- Official language: English
- Parent organization: University of Michigan Law School
- Website: www.clearinghouse.net

The Civil Rights Litigation Clearinghouse is a website that serves as a searchable resource for information and documents relating to civil rights litigation. The Clearinghouse was founded by law professor Margo Schlanger in 2005, at Washington University in St. Louis, and moved in 2009 to the University of Michigan.

The Clearinghouse makes its information and documents available at no cost to policy-makers, researchers, advocates, teachers, students, and the general public. With 15,000 monthly visitors, it is the leading Internet source for the thousands of cases it covers, allowing the public unprecedented access to case documents, including court complaints and settlements. It posts both historical documents, like the original court complaint and the trial transcript from Brown v. Board of Education, and more modern ones, like the settlement agreement from Buycks-Roberson v. Citibank, a fair lending case President Barack Obama litigated in the 1990s. It has received funding from the National Science Foundation and acknowledgement in newspaper editorial pages.

The Civil Rights Litigation Clearinghouse is one of three law-school-based case Clearinghouses. The others, both at Stanford Law School, deal with intellectual property (the Stanford Intellectual Property Clearinghouse), and securities class action litigation (the Stanford Securities Class Action Clearinghouse, co-sponsored by Cornerstone Research).

== Mission ==
The goal of the Civil Rights Litigation Clearinghouse is to solve the informational scarcity that undermines understanding of large-scale civil rights cases.

It describes the problem on its website:

Civil rights litigation has been of tremendous import in this country, especially since the 1950s. The injunctions entered in civil rights cases have transformed a huge number of governmental institutions--schools, prisons, mental health facilities, housing authorities, police departments, child welfare agencies, etc. Injunctive cases have closed some institutions and opened others, dominated budget politics, become models for statutory interventions, and generally regulated practices. Thousands of such cases have been filed over the past fifty years and new cases are filed all the time; hundreds, old and new, are ongoing and remain influential. But information about the cases has always been exceedingly hard to come by.

== Scope of Collection ==
According to its website:

The Civil Rights Litigation Clearinghouse is a collection of documents and information about civil rights cases in selected case categories across the United States. Currently, the categories include: Child Welfare, Criminal Justice, Disability Rights-Public Accommodations, Education, Election/Voting Rights, Equal Employment, Fair Housing/Lending/Insurance, Immigration, Indigent Defense, Intellectual Disability (Facility), Jail Conditions, Juvenile Institution, Mental Health (Facility), Nursing Home Conditions, Policing, Prison Conditions, Public Accommodations, Public Benefits & Services, Public Housing, School Desegregation, Speech and Religious Freedom.

== Functionality ==
Users can search for cases by case-type, facility, court, location, court, issue, lawyer, or judge, or any combination. Case documents are posted in pdf. In addition, civil rights biographies and case-studies are cross-indexed.
