= John W. Reed =

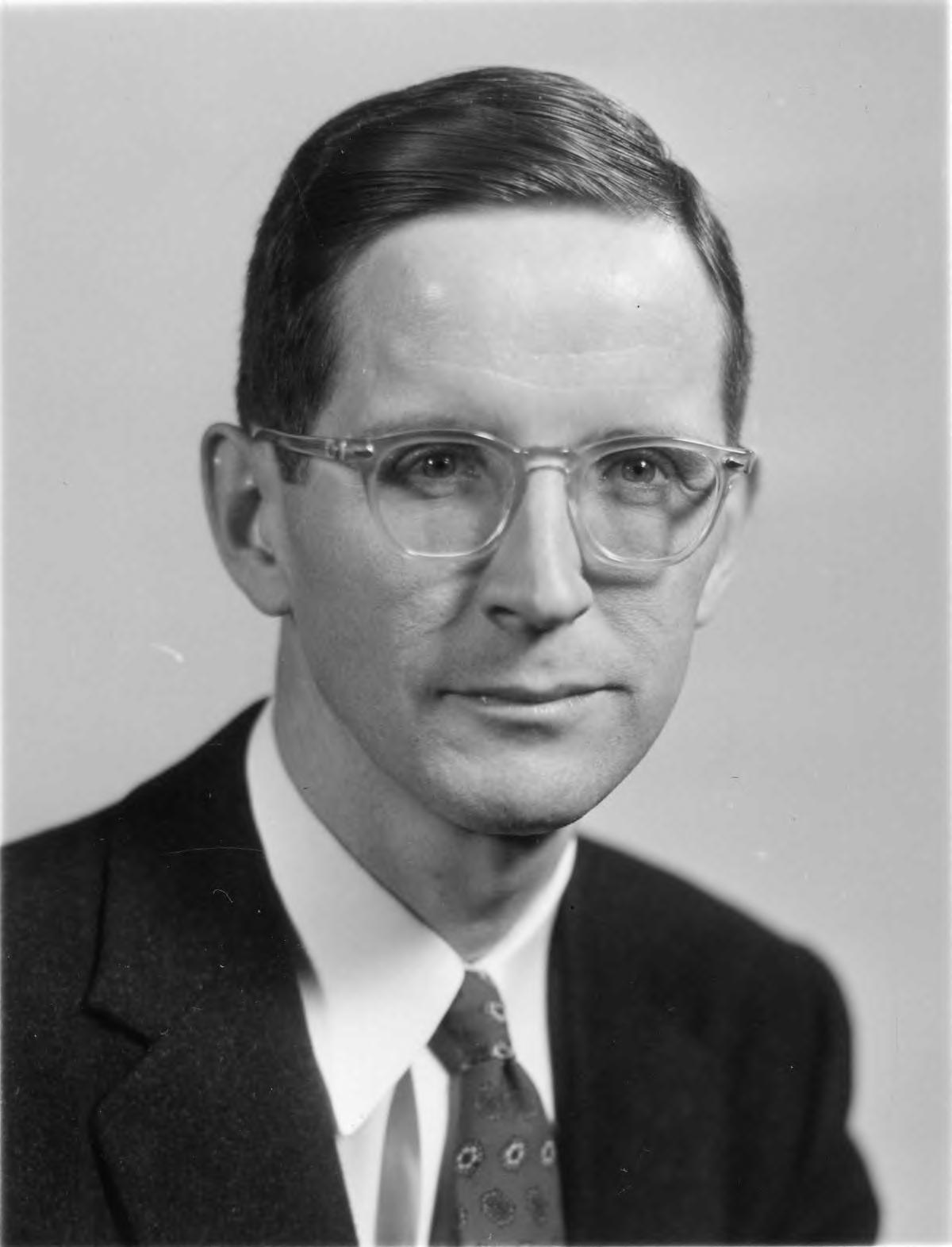
- Reed in 1956
- Born: December 11, 1918; Independence, Missouri, U.S.
- Died: March 6, 2018 (aged 99)
- Occupation: Law professor
- Title: Thomas M. Cooley Professor of Law Emeritus
- Spouse(s): Ivy F. Vonado Reed, Dorothy Elaine Floyd Reed
- Children: Alison Reed Robison, Mark (Deceased) and Randy (Deceased)

Academic background
- Education: William Jewell College (B.A.); Cornell Law School (LL.B.); Columbia Law School (LL.M., J.S.D.)

John W. Reed (11 December 1918 – 6 March 2018) was an American law professor and Thomas M. Cooley Professor of Law Emeritus at the University of Michigan Law School.

== Biography ==
Reed received law degrees from Cornell Law School (LL.B. 1942) and Columbia Law School (LL.M. 1949, J.S.D. 1957). Reed joined the Michigan Law faculty in 1949. Reed taught civil procedure, evidence, trial advocacy, and other courses at Michigan Law, and won many teaching awards.

Reed left Michigan to become dean of the University of Colorado Law School, but returned to Michigan in 1968. In retirement, he became dean of the Wayne State University Law School and taught there. Reed served as a visiting professor at Harvard, Yale, Chicago, NYU, and other law schools. Reed was succeeded as Thomas M. Cooley Professor of Law by Edward H. Cooper.

Reed received awards from the American College of Trial Lawyers, Association of Continuing Legal Education Administrators, and State Bar of Michigan. He is an academic fellow of the International Society of Barristers and was the society's administrative director and editor.

Reed was admitted to the bar in Michigan on June 10, 1953. The John W. Reed Michigan Lawyer Legacy Award of the State Bar of Michigan is named in his honor.

== Personal life ==
In 1946 Reed married Ivy Vonada and they had three children, Alison, Mark, and Randy. John is survived by Ivy Vonada Reed of Lynnwood, WA., and their daughter Alison Robison of Saline, MI.; and daughters of Dorothy - Victoria Peter, of Reston, PA., and Suzanne Unger of Pinckney, MI. Reed was married to Dorothy Elaine Floyd Reed, who lived from 1926 to 2012.

== Notes ==
Academic offices
Preceded by Edward C. King	7th Dean of the University of Colorado School of Law; 1964-1968	Succeeded by Don W. Sears
