= Robert S. Summers =

American legal scholar (1933–2019)

Robert Summers
- Born: September 19, 1933; Halfway, Oregon, U.S.
- Died: March 1, 2019 (aged 85); New Canaan, Connecticut, U.S.

Academic background
- Education: University of Oregon (BS); Harvard University (LLB)

Academic work
- Discipline: Law
- Sub-discipline: Jurisprudence; Statutory interpretation Contracts law Corporate law
- Institutions: Cornell Law School

Robert Samuel Summers (September 19, 1933 – March 1, 2019) was an American legal scholar who was the former William G. McRoberts Research Professor in the Administration of the Law at the Cornell Law School. He retired in 2011.

== Early life and education ==
Summers was born in 1933 on his family's 80-acre farm a few miles outside Halfway, Oregon. His early academic education was limited, due to the difficulty in attracting good teachers to the remote valley in eastern Oregon. After graduating from the University of Oregon, he studied at the University of Southampton as a Fulbright Scholar. He earned a Bachelor of Laws degree from Harvard Law School.

== Career ==
Summers taught for 50 years, 42 of them at Cornell Law School. He won international acclaim for his work in contracts, commercial law, jurisprudence, and legal theory. During his time at Cornell Law School, Summers authored and co-authored multiple works on various legal topics with a focus on contracts and commercial law. His treatise on the Uniform Commercial Code, co-authored with Professor James J. White, is the most widely cited on the subject. His other influential works include texts on legal realism, form and substance in the law, and on statutory interpretation. Summers has served as official advisor the drafting commissions of the Civil Code of Russia and Egyptian Civil Code. Summers was also named principal co-drafter of a new code of contract law for Rwanda. He lectured annually on jurisprudence and legal theory in Britain, Scandinavia, and Europe.

In the 1960s, Summers began advocating for more minority students in law schools, holding summer sessions around the country, with Robert M. O'Neil of the University of California, Berkeley, to recruit and prepare minority undergraduates.

Summers taught contracts and American legal theory with his class mascot, "the particularistic contract snail," and last completed a book on the varieties of legal form and their importance in law, which is titled Form and Function in a Legal System: A General Study, published by Cambridge University Press.

He was well known among Cornell Law School students for his inquisitive, spirited use of the Socratic method in instruction.

== Personal life ==
Summers died on March 1, 2019, at the age of 85.
