= James J. White =

American legal scholar (born 1934)

James White
- Born: James Justesen White; 1934 (age 91–92)

Academic background
- Education: Amherst College; University of Michigan

Academic work
- Discipline: Law
- Sub-discipline: Commercial law
- Institutions: University of Michigan

James Justesen White (born 1934) is an American legal scholar working as the Robert A. Sullivan Professor of Law at the University of Michigan Law School. He has published the most widely recognized treatise on commercial law, Uniform Commercial Code with Robert S. Summers.

== Education ==
White earned a Bachelor of Arts degree Amherst College in 1956, graduating magna cum laude and Phi Beta Kappa. He earned a Juris Doctor from the University of Michigan Law School in 1962, graduating as a member of the Order of the Coif. During law school, White was an editor of the Michigan Law Review. He was admitted to the California Bar in 1963, which he resigned from in 1974, and he was admitted to the Michigan Bar in 1967.

== Career ==
Before joining the faculty at the University of Michigan Law School in 1964, White practiced law with Latham & Watkins in Los Angeles. From 1978 until 1981, White served as the associate dean of the University of Michigan Law School. White has published nearly 20 books on contract and bankruptcy law, and he has published nearly 70 academic articles in numerous legal journals, including the Michigan Law Review, the Cornell Law Review, the Yale Law Journal, and the Cardozo Law Review. White received the L. Hart Wright Award for Excellence in Teaching for 2001–2002 and the Homer Kripke Achievement Award, given by the American College of Commercial Finance Lawyers. White took a three-year hiatus from the University of Michigan Law School in 2012; however, he returned in 2015. White has been a visiting professor at Harvard Law School, Columbia Law School, Cornell Law School, University of South Carolina School of Law, Tel Aviv University Law School, University of Toledo College of Law, and Wayne State University Law School.

White is a Reporter and member of the Drafting Committee for Implementation of the UN Convention on Independent Guarantees and Stand-by Letters of Credit. He is a member of the Permanent Editorial Board for the Uniform Commercial Code. White also served as a fighter pilot in the United States Air Force.

== Personal life ==
White is married to Nancy White and resides in Ann Arbor, Michigan.
