= Samuel Bagenstos =

American attorney and academic (born 1970)

Samuel R. Bagenstos
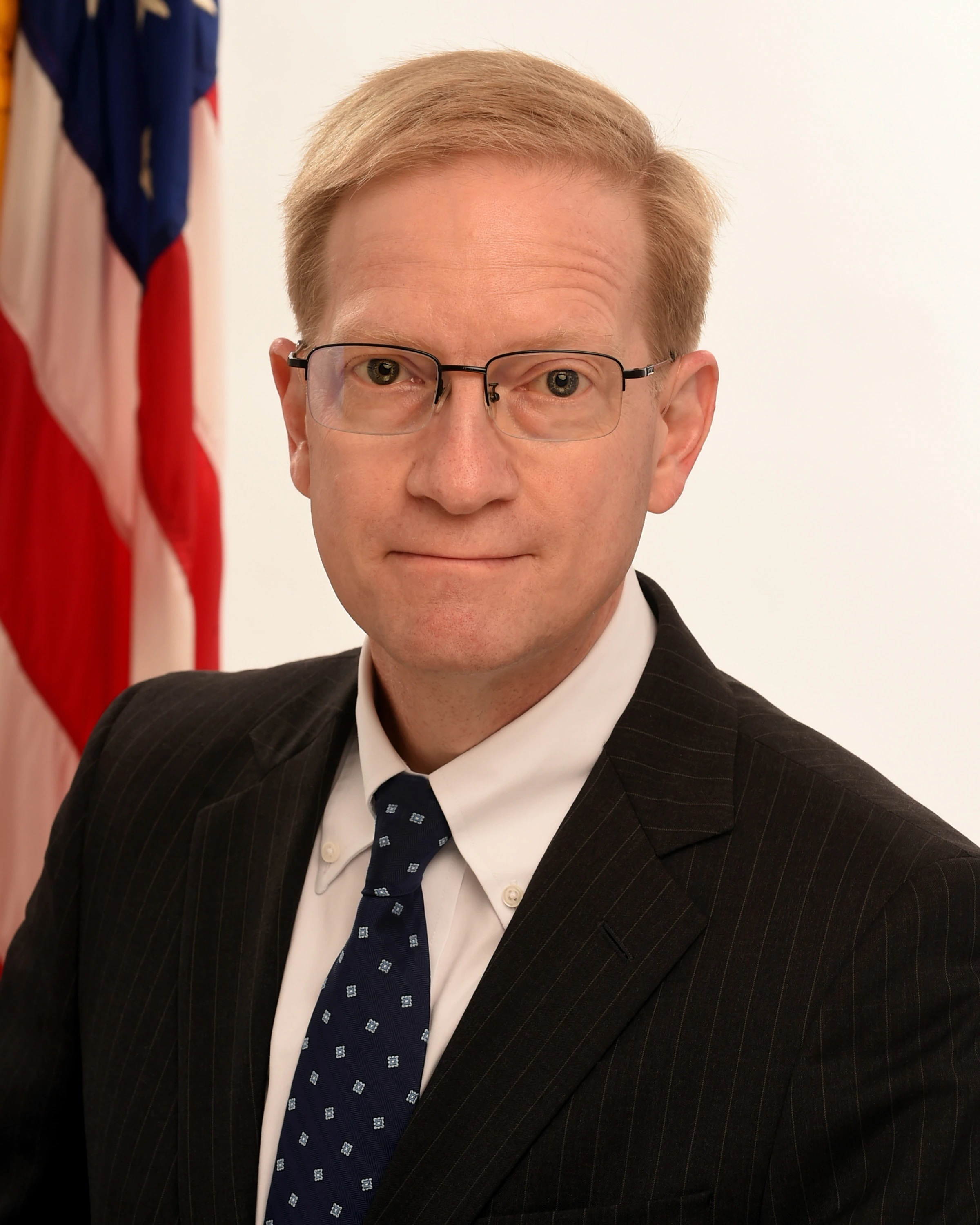

General Counsel of the United States Department of Health and Human Services
- In office June 15, 2022 – December 13, 2024
- President: Joe Biden
- Preceded by: Robert Charrow
- Succeeded by: Michael B. Stuart

General Counsel of the Office of Management and Budget
- In office January 20, 2021 – June 10, 2022
- President: Joe Biden
- Preceded by: Mark Paoletta
- Succeeded by: Daniel Jacobson

Personal details
- Born: Samuel Robert Bagenstos; 1970 (age 55–56)
- Spouse: Margo Schlanger (m. 1998)
- Education: University of North Carolina; Harvard Law School
- Occupation: Professor, attorney

Samuel Robert Bagenstos (born 1970) is an American attorney and academic who was the general counsel of the United States Department of Health and Human Services from June 2022 to December 2024, and general counsel of for the Office of Management and Budget from January 2021 until June 2022. He served for two years as the principal deputy assistant attorney general in the United States Department of Justice Civil Rights Division under Attorney General Eric Holder and Assistant Attorney General Tom Perez.

Bagenstos is a long-time civil rights lawyer, who began his career in the U.S. Department of Justice Civil Rights Division in 1994. His work has focused particularly on voting rights, disability rights, and workers' rights.

== Education ==
Bagenstos earned a Bachelor of Arts degree from the University of North Carolina in 1990 and a Juris Doctor from Harvard Law School in 1993, graduating magna cum laude. He received the Fay Diploma (awarded to valedictorian) and was Articles Office Co-chair for the Harvard Law Review.

== Career ==
Bagenstos clerked for Judge Stephen Reinhardt on the Ninth Circuit for one year, and then joined the Civil Rights Division of the U.S. Department of Justice. He served as law clerk to Justice Ruth Bader Ginsburg of the U.S. Supreme Court in the 1997–1998 Term.

He has argued four U.S. Supreme Court cases, representing the plaintiff. In Fry v. Napoleon Community Schools, 580 U.S. 154 (2017), he won a victory for a girl with cerebral palsy who sought to bring her service dog with her to school; the Court reversed a lower-court decision throwing the case out of court. In Young v. United Parcel Service, 575 U.S. 206 (2015), the Court established new protections for pregnant workers. In United States v. Georgia, 546 U.S. 151 (2006), the Court upheld the constitutionality of Title II of the Americans with Disabilities Act of 1990, as applied in the case of a prisoner who used a wheelchair. And in Chevron v. Echazabal, 536 U.S. 73 (2002), the Court rejected the plaintiff's argument that he should be the one to decide if chemicals in the workplace posed too much risk to his health, given that he had hepatitis.

In Mays v. Snyder, Bagenstos has been representing Flint residents seeking relief for injuries they received in the Flint water crisis; he litigated an appeal in which the 6th Circuit Court of Appeals held that Flint residents must receive the chance to make their constitutional case in court.

In Husted v. A. Philip Randolph Institute, Bagenstos filed a brief challenging Ohio's voter purge procedure, criticizing the Trump administration's reversal of longstanding U.S. Department of Justice policy on the National Voter Registration Act of 1993.

Bagenstos has signed briefs in the U.S. Supreme Court in support of the anti-discrimination case brought by transgender student Gavin Grimm, and opposing a constitutional right to discriminate against same-sex couples by businesses. He testified before Congress in favor of the Employment Non-Discrimination Act, which would protect workers against discrimination based on sexual orientation and gender identity.

As Principal Deputy Assistant Attorney General, Bagenstos was second-in-charge of the Civil Rights Division, and supervised the Civil Rights Division's appellate work, disability rights enforcement, and other matters. In the disability rights area, he emphasized intensified enforcement of the Supreme Court's decision in Olmstead v. L.C., which requires that states provide services to people with disabilities in the most integrated setting appropriate to their individual situation. He also focused on ensuring that emerging technologies are accessible to people with disabilities.

He has been a member of the faculty of Harvard Law School, and a visiting professor at UCLA School of Law and University of Michigan Law School. He was a professor of law from 2004 to 2009 at Washington University School of Law, and from 2007 to 2008.

He is the author of Law and the Contradictions of the Disability Rights Movement (Yale University Press 2009), and a Foundation Press casebook on disability law, along with numerous articles. In 2018, he was an unsuccessful candidate for the Michigan Supreme Court.

In January 2021, Bagenstos was appointed general counsel to the Office of Management and Budget in the Biden administration. He was nominated to serve as general counsel to the United States Department of Health and Human Services on August 6, 2021. The Senate's Health Committee held hearings on his nomination on October 26, 2021. On November 17, 2021, the committee deadlocked on Bagenstos' nomination in a party-line vote. On February 9, 2022, the entire Senate voted to discharge the nomination from the committee in a vote of 48–47, clearing the way for Bagenstos to be confirmed on June 9, 2022, by a 49–43 vote.

== Personal life ==
Bagenstos has been married to law professor Margo Schlanger since 1998.

== See also ==
- List of law clerks for the sixth seat of the Supreme Court of the United States
