= Reshma Jagsi =

American radiation oncologist

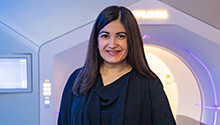
- Born: April 28, 1974 (age 52); England
- Spouse: John A. E. Pottow

Academic background
- Education: BA, Government, 1995, Harvard College; MD, Harvard Medical School; DPhil, Comparative Social Policy, University of Oxford
- Thesis: A comparative analysis of the political and professional regulation of junior doctors' work hours in the United States and United Kingdom. (2001)

Academic work
- Institutions: Emory University

Reshma Jagsi (born April 28, 1974) is an American Radiation oncologist. She is the Lawrence W. Davis Professor and Chair in the Department of Radiation Oncology and Senior Faculty Fellow in the Center for Ethics at Emory University. Overall, she is the author of over 450 published articles in peer-reviewed medical journals and continues scholarly research in three primary areas of interest: breast cancer, bioethics, and gender equity, with the support of grants from the National Institutes of Health (NIH), the Doris Duke Charitable Foundation, and the Susan G. Komen Foundation, for which she serves as a Senior Scholar.

== Early life and education ==
Jagsi was born on April 28, 1974 in England. Her family moved to the United States in 1978 so her father could redo his residency, which took three years, before settling in Texas. As a student at Midway High School, Jagsi recorded a perfect score on her Scholastic Aptitude Test as a 16-year-old senior.

After graduating from high school, Jagsi enrolled at Harvard College in Boston and majored in Government. In 1994, Glamour magazine listed Jagsi amongst their Top 10 College Women, earning a $1,000 scholarship for winning the competition. She also received both the Fay Prize, the Radcliffe College's highest undergraduate honor, awarded to the female graduate showing greatest promise in scholarship, conduct, and character, and Harvard College's Freund Prize, which is awarded to the summa cum laude graduate ranked first in the class, after completing her Bachelor of Arts's degree with Straight-As. Following this, she enrolled at Harvard Medical School with an entering class of more women than men. As a graduate student, she was named a Marshall Scholar and received a full tuition scholarship for two or three years of study at any British university, as well as books, travel and living expenses. While concurrently enrolled for her medical degree at Harvard, Jagsi enrolled at the University of Oxford to earn an MSc degree in Comparative Social Research and DPhil in Social Studies. She went on to complete her residency training in radiation oncology at Massachusetts General Hospital's Harvard Radiation Oncology Program and completed fellowship training in ethics at Harvard's Center for Ethics.

== Career ==
Jagsi joined the faculty at Michigan Medicine in 2006 and worked within the Center for Bioethics and Social Sciences in Medicine studying issues of bioethics arising from cancer care. Building on her seminal study published in the New England Journal of Medicine in 2007, documenting the "gender gap" in the authorship of articles published in major medical journals, she went on to receive grants from the American Medical Association, Burroughs Wellcome Fund, Robert Wood Johnson Foundation, and the National Institutes of Health to develop influential studies of challenges and interventions to promote women's advancement in the field of medicine. In 2012, she was the lead author of the paper, Gender Differences in the Salaries of Physician Researchers, published in JAMA, which found that women earned an average of $12,194 less than men a year when all other factors remained the same. A few years later, she led another study which found that 30 per cent of female doctors in the United States have been sexually harassed or assaulted in the workplace, compared to only 4 per cent of American male doctors. Beyond focusing on gender, Jagsi also conducted numerous large observational studies and leads national clinical trials seeking to optimize the quality of breast cancer care. In recognition of these contributions, she was appointed to the Early Breast Cancer Trialists Collaborative Group Steering Committee and the San Antonio Breast Cancer Symposium program planning committee. At the 2020 Symposium, she presented on the disconnect between physicians and patients' radiation therapy side effects.

As a professor and deputy chair of the Department of Radiation Oncology at the University of Michigan, Jagsi was appointed director of the Center for Bioethics and Social Sciences in Medicine at Michigan Medicine in 2017. In this role, she continued to study sexual harassment and gender inequality in academic medicine and earned the American Medical Women's Association Gender Equity Award for "promoting equality in the education and training of physicians by assuring equal opportunities for women and men to study and practice medicine." Jagsi was also elected to the American Society for Clinical Investigation and to the Board of Directors for the American Society of Clinical Oncology. Jagsi's work on research on inflammatory breast cancer and innovative radiotherapy approaches to intensify treatment was also supported by the Susan G. Komen Foundation.

In March 2019, Jagsi was named the Newman Family Professor at the University of Michigan Medical School. While serving in this role, she was the recipient of the Association of American Medical Colleges Group on Women in Medicine and Science Leadership Award for her "significant impact on the advancement of women’s roles in academic medicine and science." She was also elected a Fellow of the American Society of Clinical Oncology, the American Society for Radiation Oncology, and the American Association for Women Radiologists. Her work directly inspired a multi-million dollar investment by the Doris Duke Foundation to launch a national extension of a unique program she first evaluated titled the "Doris Duke Foundation's Fund to Retain Clinical Scientists."

During the COVID-19 pandemic in North America, Jagsi was elected a Hastings Center Fellow for her "outstanding accomplishments whose work has informed scholarship and public understanding of complex ethical issues in health, health care, science, and technology." Throughout the pandemic, she studied how income inequality for women in oncology was exacerbated by COVID-19. She found that "because the onus of balancing work and family continues to be primarily on women, the pandemic has had a more severe effect on the careers of female oncologists." By December, she was the recipient of the Center for the Education of Women's Carol Hollenshead Inspire award and the LEAD Woman Oncologist of the Year award for her contributions to equity, leadership, and breast cancer care.

Jagsi remains an adjunct professor at the University of Michigan, where she leads its M-PACT cultural transformation center, a $79M program that is supported by a U54 NIH FIRST grant on which she is PI together with Professor Robert Sellers.

In 2022, she began a new position leading the large Department of Radiation Oncology at Winship Cancer Institute of Emory University, which has multiple large sites of practice across the diverse metropolitan Atlanta area. She was recognized as a Fellow of the American Association for the Advancement of Science and received ASTRO’s inaugural mentorship award. She continues her bioethics work via her professional society service and as a Senior Faculty Fellow at Emory’s Center for Ethics.

Jagsi was elected a Member of the National Academy of Medicine in 2024.

== Personal life ==
Jagsi is married to John A. E. Pottow; they have two children.
