= Rachel Rothschild =

American historian and attorney

Rachel Rothschild is an American historian and attorney who is assistant professor at University of Michigan Law School. She is known for her work on environmental law.

== Life and career ==
Rothschild was raised in Sherborn, Massachusetts. She completed an undergraduate major at Princeton University in history of science. She has a PhD in history from Yale University and a JD from New York University School of Law.

She was assistant professor at New York University's Gallatin School of Individualized Study from 2015 to 2017.

She authored the 2019 book Poisonous Skies: Acid Rain and the Globalization of Pollution, which explores the history of scientific inquiry into acid rain and the subsequent international efforts to prevent acid rain.

Rothschild authored a 2022 memo which provided legal justification for requiring compensation by fossil fuel polluters for damage caused by extreme floods and wildfires. The memo influenced governments to pursue compensation claims against polluters. For her work, she became a target for a conservative group with ties to the fossil fuel industry and the Donald Trump administration.
