= Margo Schlanger =

American law professor (born 1967)

Margo J. Schlanger
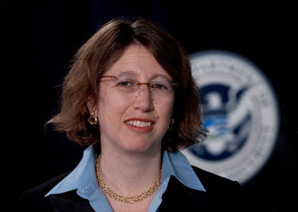
- DHS Portrait
- Born: 1967 (age 58–59)
- Occupations: Civil rights official Legal scholar
- Known for: Civil rights Prisoners rights Torts
- Spouse: Samuel Bagenstos (m. 1998)

Academic background
- Education: Yale University (BA, JD)

Margo Jane Schlanger (born 1967) is a professor of law at the University of Michigan Law School, and the founder and director of the Civil Rights Litigation Clearinghouse. Previously, she was at Washington University School of Law. From 2010 to 2012, while on leave from her professorial position, she served as the presidentially-appointed Officer for Civil Rights and Civil Liberties at the United States Department of Homeland Security. As the top civil rights official at the Department of Homeland Security, Schlanger led the office that advises department leadership about civil rights and civil liberties issues, engages with communities whose civil rights and civil liberties may be affected by Department activities, investigates and resolves civil rights complaints, and leads the Departments equal employment opportunity program. Schlanger's major initiatives as Civil Rights and Civil Liberties Officer included: creating and managing a structure for overseeing the Department's controversial Secure Communities program to ensure that it did not serve as a conduit for unconstitutional practices by local law enforcement agencies in jurisdictions covered by the program; publishing guidance for agencies that receive DHS funding on providing meaningful access to people with limited English proficiency; working with U.S. Immigration and Customs Enforcement on the reform of detention practices; and improving the department's civil rights complaint process.

She was a Commissioner of the blue-ribbon Commission on Safety and Abuse in America's Prisons, co-chaired by former United States Attorney General Nicholas Katzenbach and former United States Circuit Judge John Gibbons. She also served as the Reporter for the American Bar Association's Task Force on the Treatment of Prisoners. She has testified before Congress on community engagement in countering violent extremism, as well as on the impact of the Prison Litigation Reform Act. She also testified before the National Prison Rape Elimination Commission on the role of courts in eliminating sexual violence in jails and prisons.

Schlanger is a 1989 graduate of Yale College and a 1993 graduate of Yale Law School, where she won the Vinson Prize for clinical casework and served as the Book Reviews Editor of the Yale Law Journal. Between college and law school, she worked as a fact-checker for The New Yorker. After law school, she clerked for two years for Justice Ruth Bader Ginsburg on the Supreme Court of the United States, then worked as a trial attorney in the Civil Rights Division of the United States Department of Justice.

Schlanger has been married to Samuel Bagenstos since 1998.

In September 2021 Schlanger was nominated to be Assistant Secretary of Agriculture for Civil Rights in the Biden administration. Her nomination was resubmitted in 2023 but expired a year later and was not resubmitted.

== See also ==
- List of law clerks for the sixth seat of the Supreme Court of the United States
