= David Alan Hoffman =

American attorney and author (born 1947)

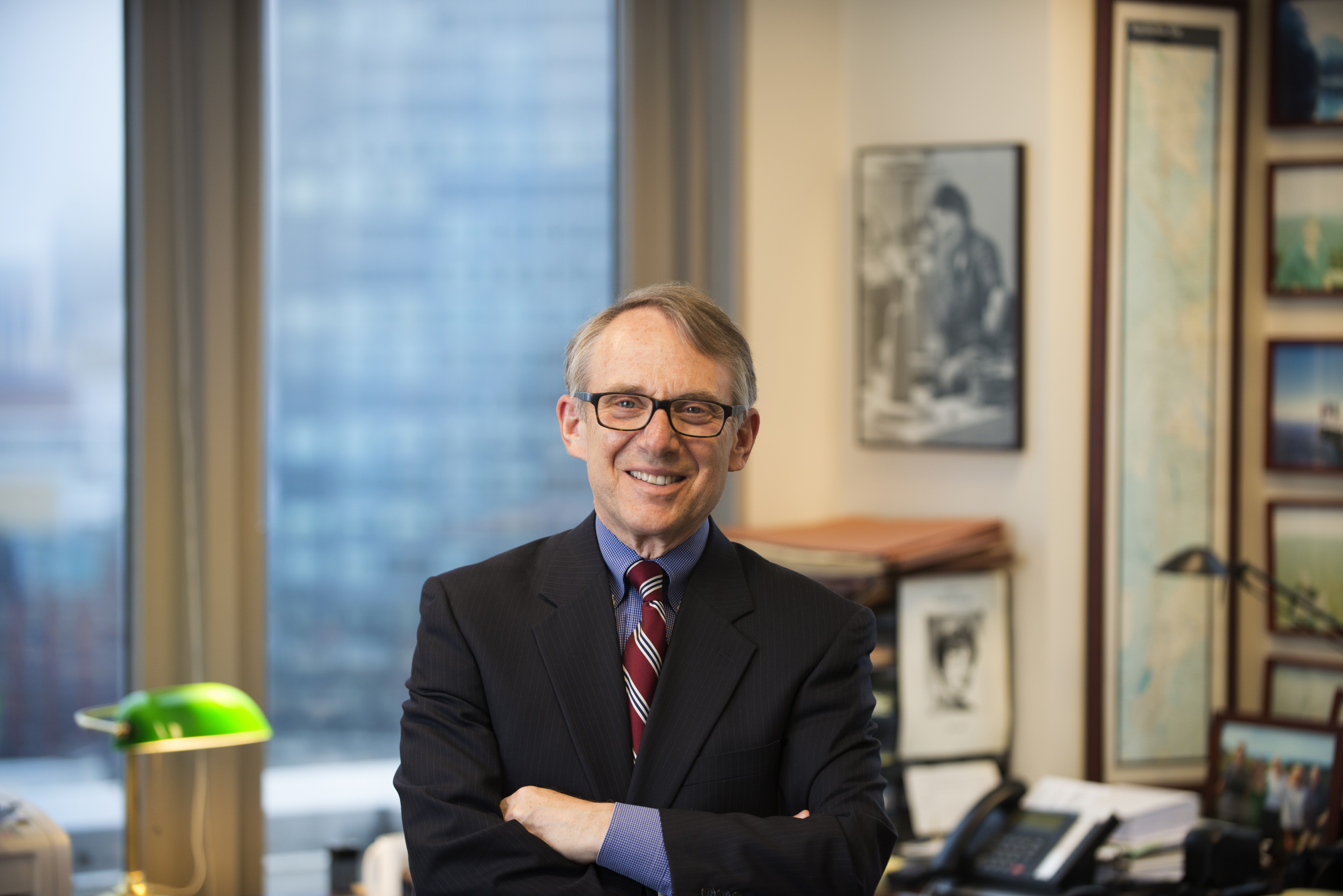
- Born: 1947 (age 78–79)
- Occupations: Attorney, mediator, and arbitrator
- Title: John H. Watson Jr. Lecturer on Law
- Awards: Distinguished Fellow, International Academy of Mediators; Lifetime Achievement Award, American College of Civil Trial Mediators; D'Alemberte-Raven Award, American Bar Association Section of Dispute Resolution; Professor Frank E.A. Sander Award in Dispute Resolution, Massachusetts Bar Association; Founders Award, Massachusetts Collaborative Law Council

Academic background
- Education: BA in English and American Literature, Princeton University; MA in American Studies, Cornell University; J.D., Harvard Law School

David Alan Hoffman is an American attorney, mediator, arbitrator, author, and academic. He is the John H. Watson, Jr. Lecturer on Law at Harvard Law School. He is also the founder of Boston Law Collaborative. His TEDx talk on Lawyers as Peacemakers describes his decision to discontinue courtroom advocacy and focus exclusively on mediation, arbitration and Collaborative law.

== Early life and education ==
Hoffman grew up in Baltimore, Maryland, and graduated from Baltimore City College. He went on to study at Princeton University, where he received a bachelor's degree in English and American Literature in 1970. He then studied at Cornell University (M.A. 1974, American Studies, all but dissertation completed toward PhD) and Harvard Law School (J.D. 1984). He clerked on the U.S. Court of Appeals for the First Circuit for Stephen G. Breyer.

In 1991 he was trained as an arbitrator by the American Arbitration Association, and in 1992 as a mediator by the Massachusetts Office of Dispute Resolution. In 2000, he was trained in Collaborative Law by the Massachusetts Collaborative Law Council. In 2019, he completed Level One training in the Internal Family Systems model from the IFS Institute, and in 2022 earned a Diversity and Inclusion Certificate from Cornell University.

== Career ==
After his studies at Cornell and before attending law school, Hoffman spent seven years as a woodworker, founding a woodworking business in Ithaca, New York called "Knock on Wood" (1974–81), which produced hand-crafted furniture, kitchen wares, games and toys.

After law school and a year of judicial clerkship, Hoffman joined the Boston law firm Hill & Barlow in 1985, where he served as a litigator in business, family and pro bono cases. In 1988–89, he took a one-year leave of absence from Hill & Barlow to work as staff attorney at the American Civil Liberties Union of Massachusetts. He became a partner at Hill & Barlow in 1992 and established an alternative dispute resolution practice group there. In 2002, he left Hill & Barlow to become a partner in The New Law Center, which focuses on non-adversarial law and dispute resolution practice.

In 2003 Hoffman founded Boston Law Collaborative (BLC), a law and dispute resolution firm. BLC has received two awards for its work in conflict resolution: in 2009 the American Bar Association gave BLC its annual Lawyer as Problem Solver Award and in 2010, the International Institute for Conflict Prevention and Resolution gave BLC its annual Law Firm Award for Excellence in ADR.

Hoffman has held numerous leadership positions in the field of alternative dispute resolution and bar association work including being the Chair of the American Bar Association section of Dispute Resolution, the Massachusetts Bar Association section of Individual Rights and Responsibilities and the Boston Bar Association ADR Committee. He has also been the President of the Massachusetts Chapter of the Association for Conflict Resolution and a Founding Member and board member of the Massachusetts Collaborative Law Council.

== Personal life ==
Hoffman is married to Leslie Warner; they have five children. In 2000, Hoffman took a six-month sabbatical from Hill & Barlow and hiked the Appalachian Trail end-to-end with his son. Hoffman is a member of a jug band, Uncle Jack's Rompin' Stompers, which formed in high school and continues to play old-time music. In 2007–09, Hoffman served as president of his synagogue, Kerem Shalom Congregation, in Concord, Massachusetts.

== Awards and honors ==
- 2005–present – Best Lawyers, U.S. News & World Report
- 2011 – John Adams Fiske Award, Massachusetts Council on Family Mediation
- 2014 – Lifetime Achievement Award, American College of Civil Trial Mediators
- 2014 – Scholar-Mentor award, Massachusetts Continuing Legal Education (MCLE) New England
- 2015 – D'Alemberte-Raven Award, ABA Section of Dispute Resolution
- 2018 – Professor Frank E.A. Sander Award in Dispute Resolution, Massachusetts Bar Association
- 2021 – Inaugural Founders Award, Massachusetts Collaborative Law
- 2021 – Top Lawyers, Boston Magazine
- 2023 – Family Mediation Lifetime Achievement Award, Academy of Professional Family Mediators,

== Bibliography ==
=== Books ===
- Massachusetts Alternative Dispute Resolution (1994) ISBN 9781663339171
- Bringing Peace into the Room: How the Personal Qualities of the Mediator Impact the Process of Conflict Resolution (2003) ISBN 9780787968502
- Mediation: A Practice Guide for Mediators, Lawyers, and Other Professionals (2013) ISBN 9781575898070

=== Selected articles ===
- Bowling, D., & Hoffman, D. (2003). Bringing peace into the room. How the Personal.
- Hoffman, D. A. (2006). The future of ADR practice: Three hopes, three fears, and three predictions. Negot. J., 22, 467.
- Hoffman, D. A. (2011). Mediation, Multiple Minds, and Managing the Negotiation Within. Harv. Negot. L. Rev., 16, 297.
- Hoffman, D. A. (2011). Mediation and the art of shuttle diplomacy. Negotiation Journal, 27(3), 263–309.
- Hoffman, D. A., & Wolman, R. N. (2012). The psychology of mediation. Cardozo J. Conflict Resol., 14, 75
- Hoffman, D. A., & Schepard, A. (2020). To Disclose or not to Disclose? That is the Question in Collaborative Law. Family Court Review, 58(1), 83–108.
- Hoffman, D.A. (2021). Teaching Diversity at Harvard Law School, Or: The Education of a Straight, White, Cis-Gender, Able-Bodied, Upper-Middle-Class Male Lecturer on Law.
- Hoffman, D.A., & Winter, H. (2022). Follow the Science: Proven Strategies for Reducing Unconscious Bias. Harv. Negot. L. Rev., 28(1).
