= Michigan Telecommunications and Technology Law Review =

Michigan Technology Law Review
- Discipline: Law review
- Language: English

Publication details
- History: 1994 to present
- Publisher: University of Michigan Law School ( (United States) USA)
- Frequency: Semiannually

Standard abbreviations
- Bluebook: Mich. Telecomm. & Tech. L. Rev.
- ISO 4: Mich. Technol. Law Rev.

Indexing
- ISSN: 1528-8625
- OCLC no.: 60637189

Links
- Journal homepage

The Michigan Technology Law Review (MTLR), previously known as the Michigan Telecommunications and Technology Law Review (MTTLR) before 2018, is a scholarly technology law journal at the University of Michigan Law School.

== Overview ==
MTLR is one of six legal journals published under the auspices of the University of Michigan Law School. The publication features a staff of over 50 student editors. MTLR's office is located in the University of Michigan's Legal Research Building.

=== Subject Matter ===
MTLR is dedicated to promoting discourse and thought on the interrelated legal, social, business and public policy issues raised by technology. MTLR provides a forum for examination of the concerns and tensions between law and technology. The articles in MTLR advance legal reasoning and often serve as a catalyst for critical analysis of the complex issues that deal with development of the law and technology.

=== Availability ===
MTLR is available in both print and electronic formats. MTLR articles can be obtained at the MTLR website for free, while print versions are available for a fee.

== History ==
MTLR was founded as a joint venture between the University of Michigan Law School and Ross Business School in 1994, and was originally titled the "Michigan Telecommunications and Technology Law Review." MTLR was one of the first law journals available over the internet in an electronic format. MTLR published annually for its first eight volumes, but has since moved to semiannual publication. MTLR changed its name from the "Michigan Telecommunications and Technology Law Review" to the "Michigan Technology Law Review" in 2018.

== MTLR Blog ==
In 2007, MTLR launched a scholarly blog. The blog features posts written by student editors, guest writers, and faculty contributors. Posts on the blog vary in their length and formality, ranging from just a few sentences to lengthy discussions.

== Symposia ==
MTLR has hosted ten different symposia that have covered a variety of topics involving the interplay of law and technology. The most recent symposium "Privacy, Technology, and the Law," examined the legal, business, and policy issues surrounding big data and privacy.
