= Robert Charrow =

American lawyer and government official

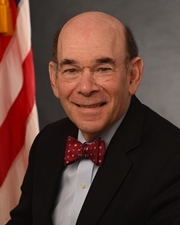

General Counsel of the United States Department of Health and Human Services
- In office January 2, 2018 – January 20, 2021
- President: Donald Trump
- Preceded by: William B. Schultz
- Succeeded by: Samuel Bagenstos

Principal Deputy General Counsel of the United States Department of Health and Human Services
- In office 1985–1989
- President: Ronald Reagan

Personal details
- Born: October 21, 1944 (age 82) St. Louis, Missouri
- Education: Harvey Mudd College; Stanford Law School

Robert Phillip Charrow (born October 21, 1944) is an American lawyer and government official.

Currently a shareholder at the law firm of Greenberg Traurig, he was nominated by President Donald Trump to be the General Counsel of the United States Department of Health and Human Services. He was confirmed on December 21, 2017. He previously worked for the law firm of Crowell & Moring. In the Ronald Reagan administration, Charrow served as Deputy and then Principal Deputy General Counsel for the U.S. Department of Health and Human Services. In those roles, he supervised the chief counsel for the Health Care Financing Administration, Office of Inspector General, the Food and Drug Administration, and the United States Public Health Service.
