= University of Michigan Law School =

Public law school in Ann Arbor, Michigan

Coordinates: 42°16′26.9″N 83°44′21.6″W

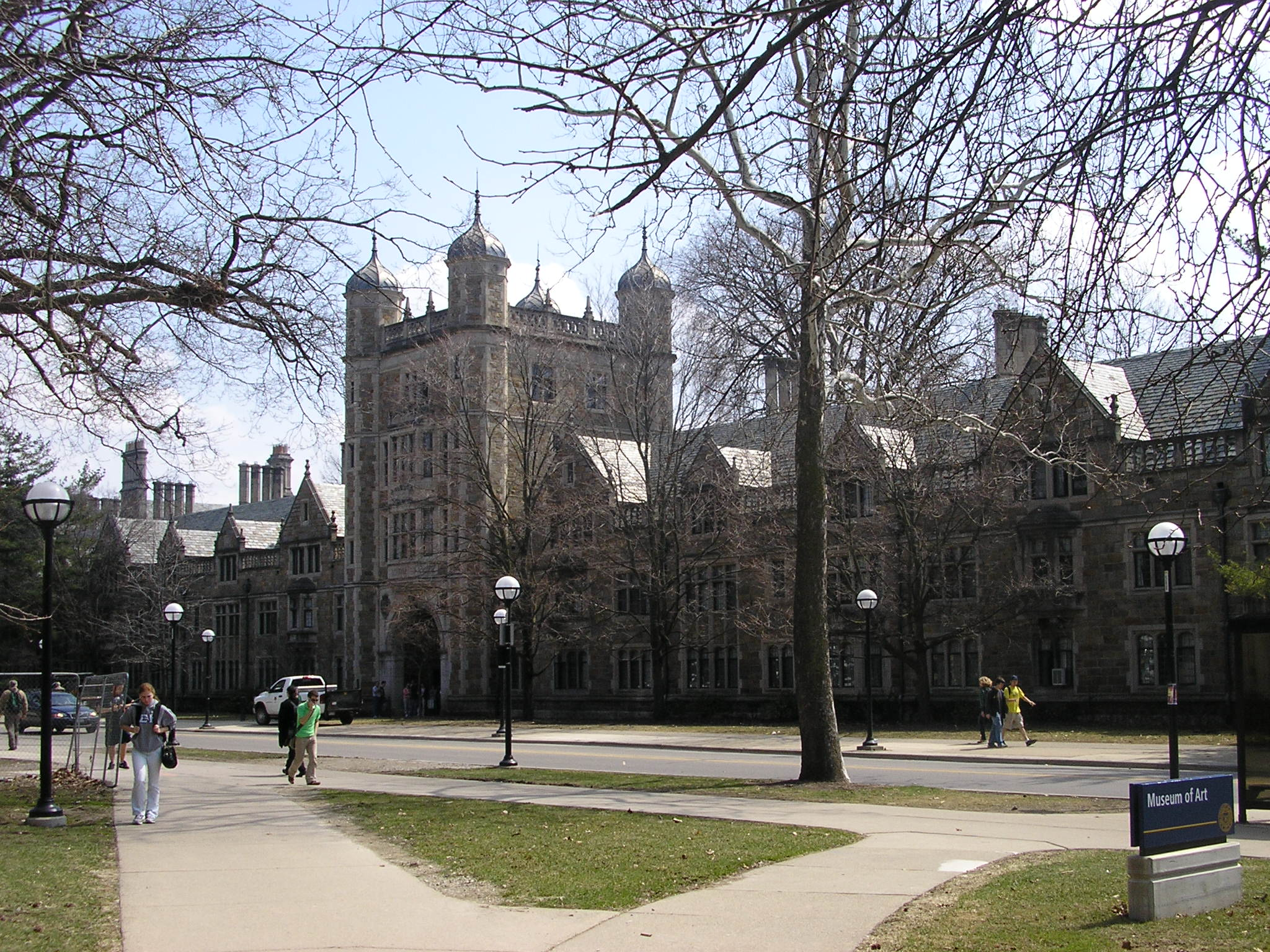
- Parent school: University of Michigan
- Established: 1859; 167 years ago
- School type: Public law school
- Endowment: $500 million (2019)
- Parent endowment: $17.9 billion
- Dean: Neel U. Sukhatme
- Location: Ann Arbor, Michigan, U.S.
- Enrollment: 1000
- Faculty: 119 (Full–time); 89 (Part–time)
- USNWR ranking: 8th (tie) (2025)
- Bar pass rate: 97.27%
- Website: michigan.law.umich.edu
- ABA profile: Standard 509 Report

The University of Michigan Law School (branded as Michigan Law) is the law school of the University of Michigan, a public research university in Ann Arbor, Michigan. Founded in 1859, the school offers Master of Laws (LLM), Master of Comparative Law (MCL), Juris Doctor (JD), and Doctor of the Science of Law (SJD) degree programs.

The law school is primarily supported through student tuition, private gifts, and endowment payouts, with less than 2% of its expenses covered by state appropriations.

As of 2024, the law school enrolls 990 students and employs 119 full-time faculty members and 89 part–time faculty members. Notable alumni include U.S. Supreme Court justices Frank Murphy, William Rufus Day, and George Sutherland, as well as a number of heads of state and corporate executives. Approximately 98% of Class of 2022 graduates were employed within ten months of graduation; its first time bar passage rate in 2023 was 95.45% and the passage rate for all graduates within two years was 99.20%.

== History ==
=== 19th century ===
Michigan Law is one of the oldest law schools in the United States. In 1837, the statute that created the Regents of the University of Michigan provided for Michigan University to have a department of law. Due to tight funds and the fact that lawyers-in-training preferred to learn alongside practitioners, it was not immediately created. The law school was eventually founded on October 4^{th} 1859, by Charles I. Walker, James V. Campbell and Thomas M. Cooley.

The law school inherited a progressive tradition from Michigan’s politics as a state that emphasized abolition of slavery and educational reform. In 1870, Gabriel Franklin Hargo graduated from Michigan Law as the second African American to graduate from law school in the United States. In 1871, Sarah Killgore, a Michigan Law graduate, became the first woman to both graduate from law school and be admitted to the bar.

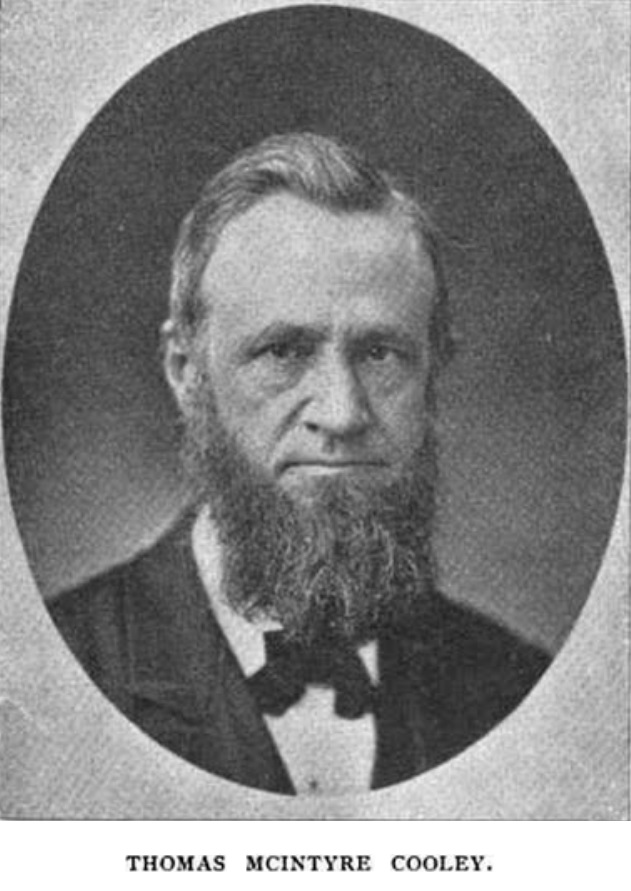
Michigan Justice and co-founder of University of Michigan Law School: Thomas McIntyre Cooley.

Paul D. Carrington describes there being a tension at the time between "populist-democratic aspirations of American law, represented by Cooley, and the rising technocratic-elitist pretensions of the profession, reflected in the emerging character of Harvard Law School." Cooley's beliefs were imprinted on Michigan Law School's founding, which emphasized practical training, Jacksonian common-man politics, and the belief that a public law school existed “to create an elite that would not be too elite.”

Carrington writes that Michigan Law School emphasized the historical and cultural origins of law, and the social and political aims it had, in contrast to elite institutions at the time, which emphasized law as self-contained and best practiced without regard for social and economic effects. This approach to legal teaching had a direct impact on other law schools, who adopted the Michigan model. For example, Cornell University invited Michigan Dean Harry Burns Hutchins to organize the Cornell Law School when it was founded in 1887.

At the start, the minimum requirements were only being over 18 years of age and a certificate of good moral character, and no tuition was charged. This was because the first students were already practicing lawyers or on the verge of taking the Bar. Junior and senior students took classes together, and graduates were awarded with an LLB. Eighteen years later in 1877, under Dean Henry Wade Rogers, the Law Department lengthened terms and began requiring entrance exams for all candidates that did not have a high school degree or comparable diploma. In October 1897, as the number of candidates grew, the law department raised criteria and required law students to satisfy the same admission requirements as Bachelor of Letters candidates.

=== 20th century ===
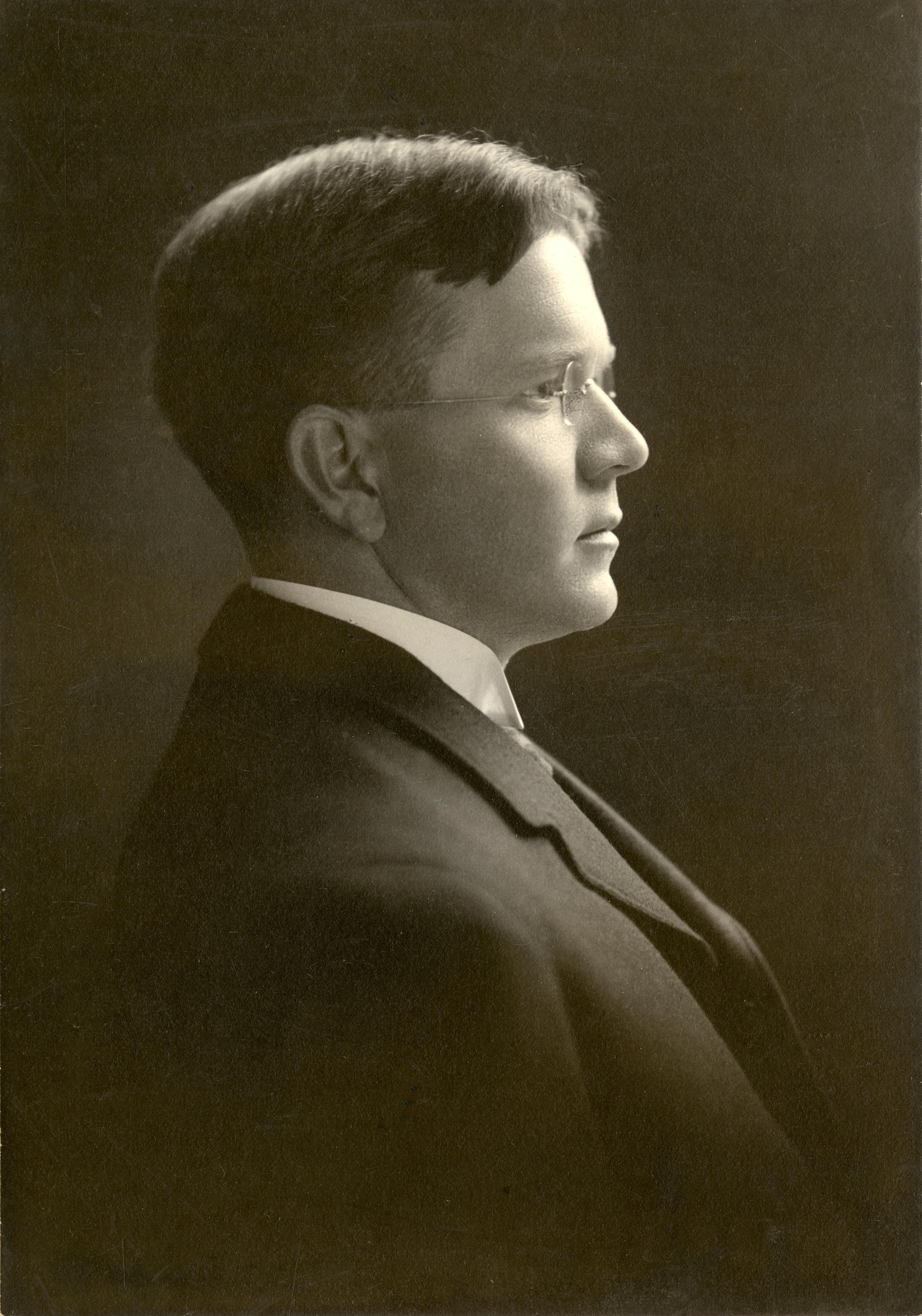
Henry Moore Bates, former dean of the University of Michigan Law School from 1910 to 1939

From 1910 to 1930, the school expanded with the Lawyer’s Club building, Hutchins Hall, Martha Cook Residence Hall, William W. Cook Legal Research Library, and the eventual Law Quadrangle. In 1915, admission requirements were again raised so candidates needed two years of prior college work, and the degree would be three years long. The Law Department was also renamed the Law School. With Michigan being located next to the Canada border and the University accepting international students, the law school emphasized international and comparative law.

Michigan Law and its professors and alumni made much progress in the 20th century. In 1902, the Michigan Law Review was established. Michigan Law School professor Edward S. Rogers authored the 1946 intellectual property Lanham Act, with his initial 1914 authorship appearing in the journal. James J. White, associate dean from 1978 to 1981, co-authored the Uniform Commercial Code that was adopted by all American states. Michigan professor James Boyd White is credited with initiating the law and literature movement with his 1973 book The Legal Imagination.

In the late 1960s, the law school introduced clinical programs to provide students with real-world experience and it quickly expanded under the deanship of Theodore J. St. Antoine.

=== 21st century ===
In 2009, Michigan Law began a $102 million enterprise to construct a new law building that would remain loyal to the English Gothic style. The enterprise was fully funded by endowments and private gifts. 2009 also marked the school's sesquicentennial celebration. As a part of the festivities, Chief Justice John Roberts visited the school and participated in the groundbreaking ceremony for the new building. The building was dedicated in 2012 and called South Hall. In December 2018, South Hall was renamed Jeffries Hall, after a record $33 million donation from real estate developer Christopher M. Jeffries.

The school's faculty continues to have a direct impact on national law. In 2022 assistant professor Rachel Rothschild authored a legal framework for climate superfunds that were adopted in Vermont and New York.

== Campus ==
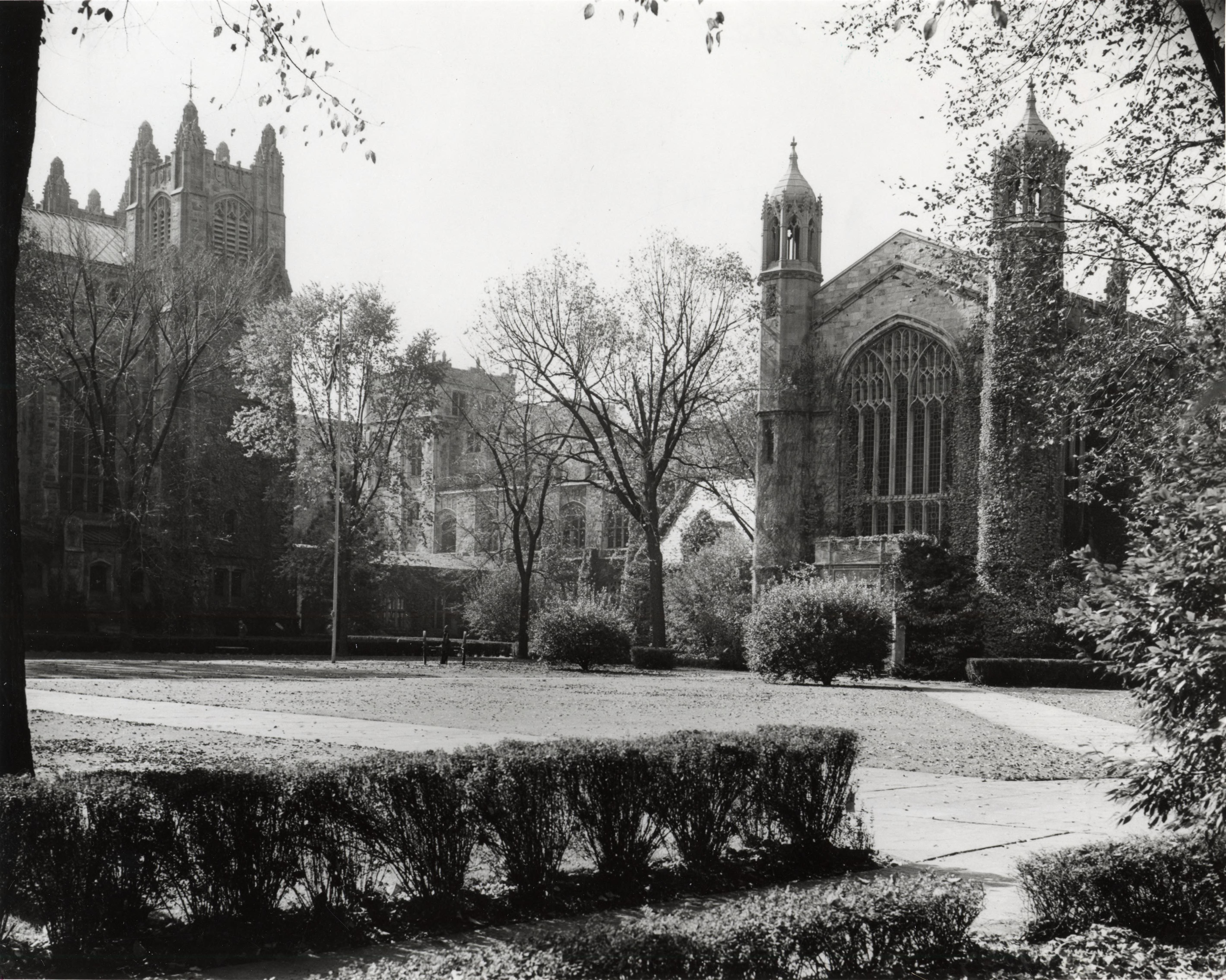
Law Quadrangle, c. 1930s

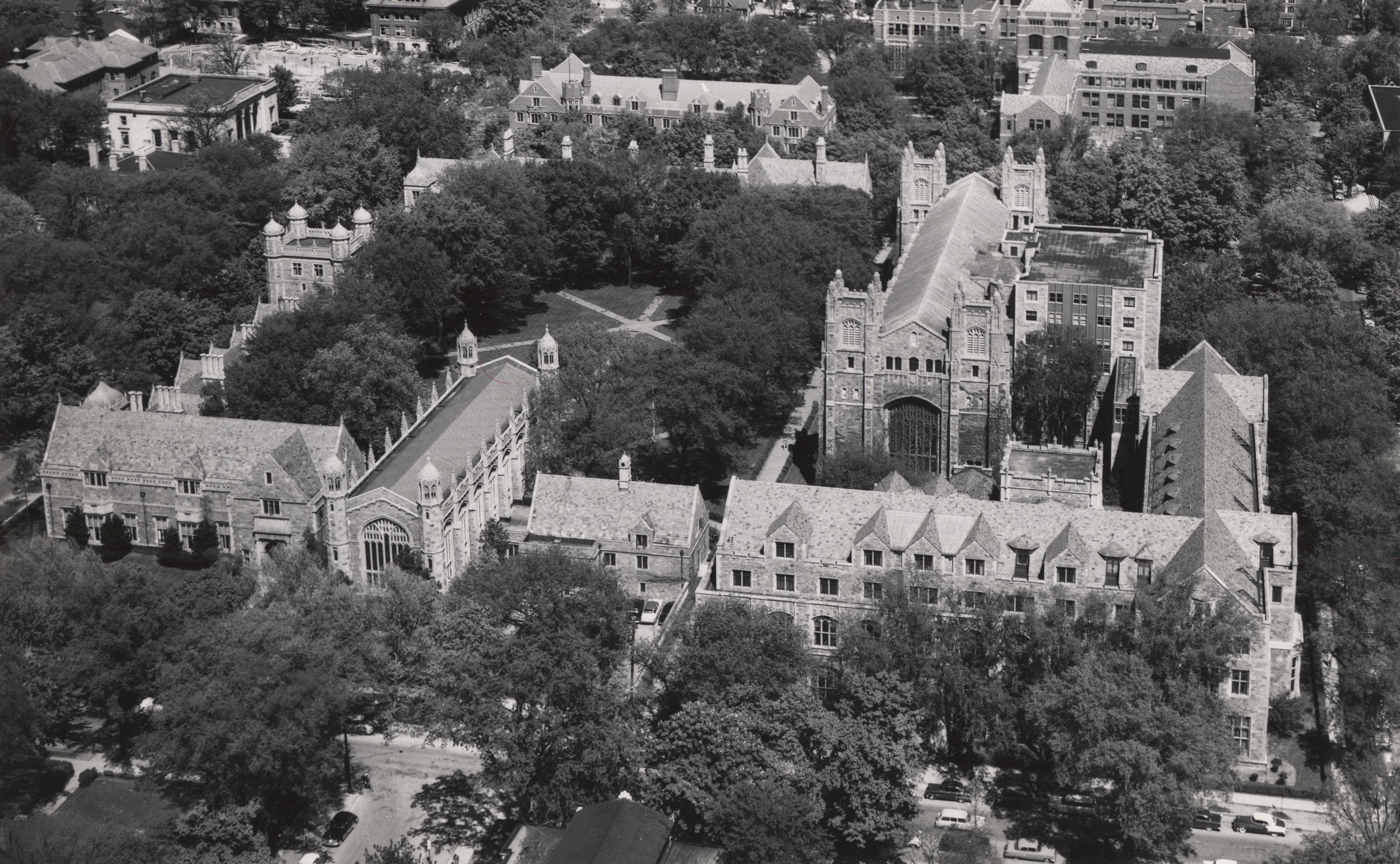
Aerial view of the University of Michigan Law Quadrangle, 1930-1940 ca.

Built between 1924 and 1933 by the architectural firm York and Sawyer with funds donated by attorney and alumnus William W. Cook, the Cook Law Quadrangle comprises four buildings:

- Hutchins Hall, the main academic building, named for former Dean of the Law School and President of the University, Harry Burns Hutchins
- The Legal Research Building
- John P. Cook Dormitory
- The Lawyer's Club, providing additional dormitory rooms and a meeting space for the residents of the Quad, is highlighted by a Great Lounge, and a dining room with a high-vaulted ceiling, an oak floor, and dark oak paneling.

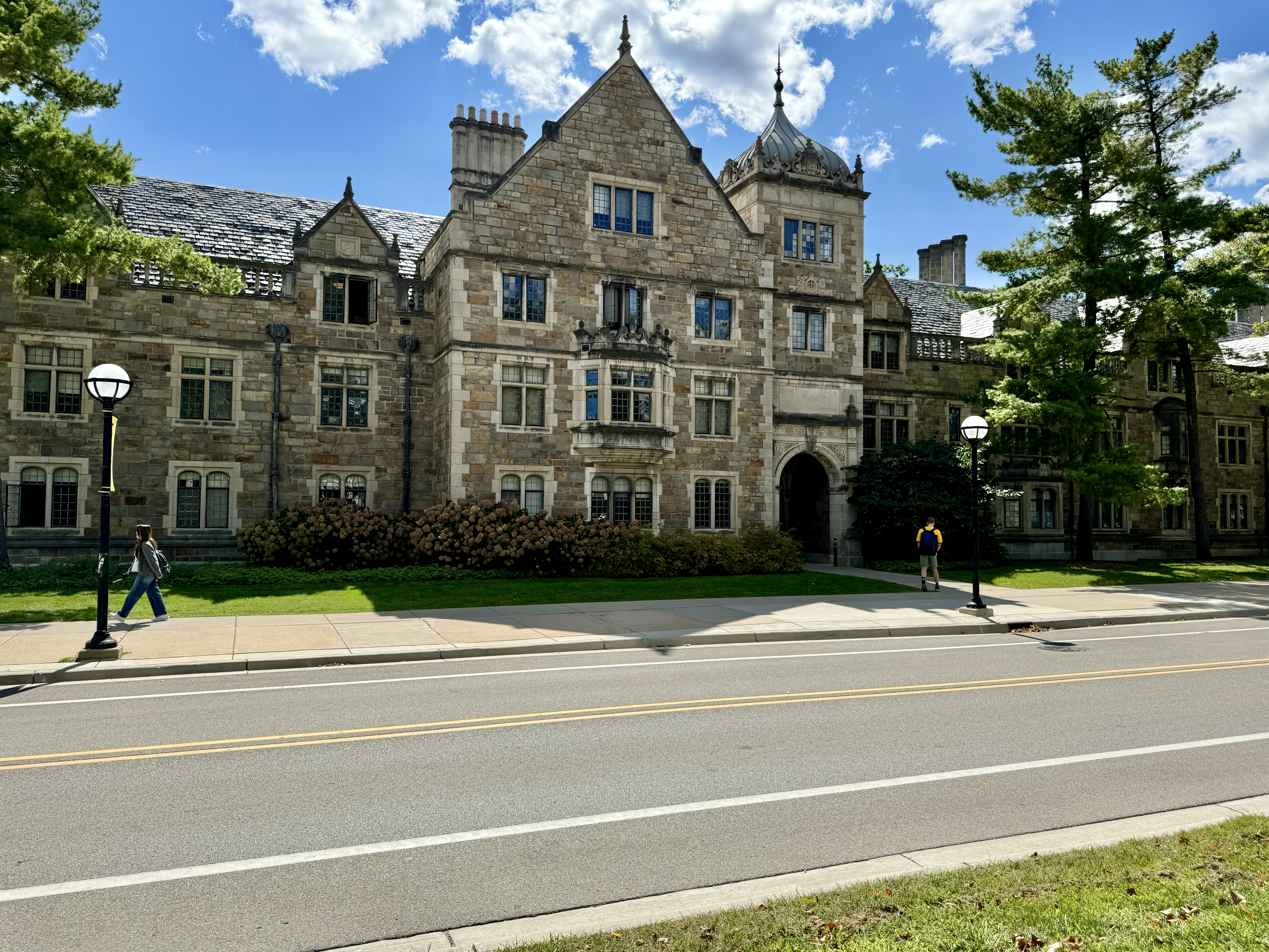
John P. Cook Dormitory

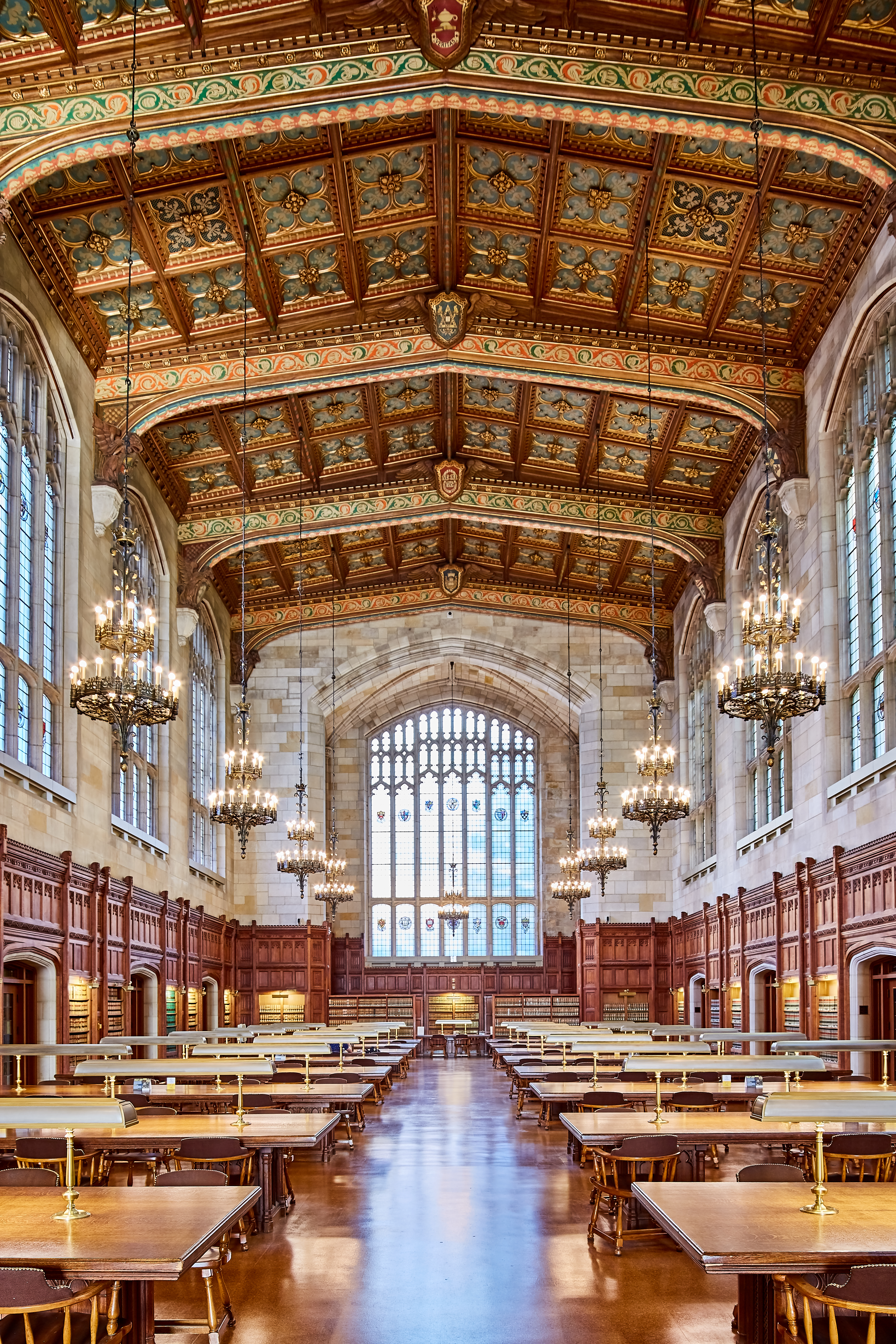
William W. Cook Legal Research Library

In 2012, extensive renovations of the Lawyers Club were undertaken thanks in part to a $20 million gift from Berkshire Hathaway vice-chairman Charles T. Munger, and was re-opened on August 19, 2013 for the 2013 school year.

== Academics ==
=== Admissions and costs ===
Admission to Michigan Law is highly selective. For the class entering in the fall of 2024, 802 applicants were accepted out of a total of 6,766, an acceptance rate of 11.85%. Out of those 802 accepted applicants, 307 students enrolled, a 38.28% enrollment rate. The 25th and 75th LSAT percentile scores for the entering class were 166 and 172, with a median of 171. The 25th and 75th undergraduate GPA percentile scores were 3.70 and 3.95, with a median of 3.86.

Tuition at the University of Michigan Law School for the 2020–2021 academic year is $63,680 for residents of the state of Michigan and $66,680 for non-residents. The estimated cost of living for a Michigan student is $21,900. Assuming no tuition increases, a typical three-year course of study at Michigan therefore costs $256,740 (or $85,580 per year) for residents and $265,740 (or $88,580 per year) for non-residents.

=== Publications ===
Michigan Law School students publish several law journals in addition to the Michigan Law Review, the sixth oldest legal journal in the United States. These include:

- University of Michigan Journal of Law Reform
- Michigan Journal of International Law
- Michigan Journal of Gender and Law
- Michigan Journal of Race & Law
- Michigan Telecommunications and Technology Law Review
- Michigan Journal of Environmental and Administrative Law
- Michigan Business & Entrepreneurial Law Review, formerly the Michigan Journal Private Equity and Venture Capital Law

Journal membership is obtained through participation in writing competitions.

=== Moot court ===
Students may compete in intramural moot court competitions, the oldest of which is the Henry M. Campbell Moot Court Competition, established in 1926 and first held in the 1927–1928 academic year. Other moot court competitions include the Child Welfare Law Moot Court Competition, Criminal Law Moot Court Competition, the Entertainment Media and Arts Moot Court Competition, the Environmental Law Moot Court Competition, the Intellectual Property Moot Court Competition, the Jessup International Law Moot Court Competition, the Vis International Arbitration Moot Court, the Native American Law Students Association Competition, the Manfred Lachs Moot Court, Michigan Law Corporate Counseling Competition, and the 1L Oral Advocacy Competition.

=== Clinics ===
Michigan Law's clinical program allows students to provide direct representation to clients under the supervision of full-time faculty. There are 18 clinical programs, including the Child Advocacy Law Clinic, the Entrepreneurship Clinic, the Environmental Law Clinic, the Federal Appellate Litigation Clinic, the International Transactions Clinic, the Michigan Innocence Clinic, the Transactional Lab, and the Unemployment Insurance Clinic.The Michigan Innocence Clinic has accomplished several exonerations for wrongful convictions.

=== Student groups ===
Michigan Law offers a wide array of student organizations centered around various interest areas, including politics, pro bono work, community service, race, gender, religion, and hobbies. Student organizations organize various annual events, from student pageants such as Mr. Wolverine to the Michigan Law Culture Show.

=== Externships and internships ===
Michigan's externship program is designed to provide students with real-world legal experience and advanced research opportunities beyond what is separately available in either a classroom or a clinic. Externships are available in places such as Switzerland, South Africa, and India.

== Reception ==
=== Rankings ===
Michigan Law was ranked third in the initial U.S. News & World Report law school rankings in 1987. Michigan Law is also one of the "T14" law schools, schools that have consistently been ranked in the top 14 since U.S. News began publishing rankings. In the 2025 U.S. News ranking, Michigan Law is ranked 8th overall. During the period 2010 through 2014, Michigan Law ranked 15th among U.S. law schools, tied with the Georgetown University Law Center, for the number of times its tenured faculty's published scholarship was highly cited in legal journals.

=== Employment ===
According to the University of Michigan Law School's ABA-required employment disclosures, 98% of the graduates of the Class of 2021 were employed or seeking an advanced degree. This includes the 94.2% of the class who had obtained jobs requiring a J.D. Of the Class of 2021, 55% were employed by firms of greater than 100 attorneys and 18% obtained clerkships. Michigan's Law School Transparency under-employment score is 5.8%, indicating the percentage of the Class of 2021 who are unemployed, pursuing an additional degree, or working in a non-professional, short-term, or part-time job nine months after graduation. In addition to Michigan, the majority of Michigan Law graduates work in New York, Illinois, California, and Washington, D.C.

== People ==
=== Notable faculty ===
- Theodore J. St. Antoine, Dean Emeritus – legal philosopher and labor law scholar
- Reuven Avi-Yonah – tax law scholar
- Samuel Bagenstos – constitutional scholar and expert on disability rights
- Evan Caminker, Dean Emeritus – constitutional law scholar
- Edward H. Cooper – civil procedure scholar
- Steven P. Croley – expert on administrative and regulatory law
- Donald Duquette – Clinical Professor of Law Emeritus
- Phoebe C. Ellsworth – scholar of law and psychology
- Samuel R. Gross – criminal law expert widely cited for work on exonerations
- Daniel Halberstam – comparative constitutional law, transnational law and European law scholar
- James C. Hathaway – international refugee law expert and scholar of public international law
- John Hudson – English legal historian
- Ellen D. Katz – voting rights and election law scholar
- Thomas E. Kauper – scholar of property law and antitrust
- Vikramaditya Khanna – expert on international commercial law and the laws of India
- James E. Krier – property law scholar
- Jessica Litman – intellectual property scholar
- Kyle D. Logue – insurance, tax and private law scholar
- Catharine MacKinnon – feminist theorist, scholar and activist
- Barbara McQuade – United States Attorney for the Eastern District of Michigan from 2010 to 2017
- Aaron Perzanowski – intellectual property scholar
- John A. E. Pottow – scholar of international commercial law, bankruptcy and consumer finance
- Richard Primus – constitutional theorist
- Margaret Radin – legal philosopher, contract and property theorist
- Margo Schlanger – civil rights scholar and founder of the Civil Rights Litigation Clearinghouse
- Rebecca J. Scott – legal historian
- Bruno Simma – German international law expert; served as a judge on the International Court of Justice from 2003 until 2012
- Mark D. West – former Dean and current Nippon Life Professor of Law- scholar of international commercial law, criminal law and Japanese law
- James Boyd White – founder of the "Law and Literature" movement
- James J. White – commercial law expert
- Christina B. Whitman – Francis A. Allen Collegiate Professor of Law

==== Former faculty ====
- Nathan Abbott – former dean of Stanford Law School and property law scholar
- T. Alexander Aleinikoff – international law scholar and former dean at Georgetown University Law Center
- Omri Ben-Shahar – law professor
- Lee Bollinger – former president of Columbia University, former President of the University of Michigan
- Henry Billings Brown – Justice of the Supreme Court of the United States
- Thomas M. Cooley – legal scholar and Chief Justice of the Michigan Supreme Court
- Harry T. Edwards – Senior Judge on the United States Court of Appeals for the District of Columbia Circuit
- Heidi Li Feldman – law professor
- Herbert Funk Goodrich – judge on the United States Court of Appeals for the Third Circuit and former dean of the University of Pennsylvania Law School
- Harry Hutchins – fourth President of the University of Michigan
- Charles Wycliffe Joiner – judge for the United States District Court for the Eastern District of Michigan
- Yale Kamisar, Professor Emeritus – criminal law and procedure expert (known as the "father of Miranda" for his influential role in the landmark U.S Supreme Court decision in Miranda v. Arizona (1966)
- Douglas Laycock – Constitutional law scholar
- Debra Ann Livingston – judge on the United States Court of Appeals for the Second Circuit
- Wade H. McCree – first African American appointed to the U.S. Court of Appeals for the Sixth Circuit
- John W. Reed – civil procedure expert
- Henry Wade Rogers – former judge on the United States Court of Appeals for the Second Circuit
- Lawrence G. Sager – Constitutional theorist and former dean at the University of Texas Law School
- Joseph Sax – environmental law scholar known for developing the public trust doctrine
- Joel Seligman – President of the University of Rochester
- A. W. B. Simpson – British legal historian
- Scott J. Shapiro – legal philosopher
- David S. Tatel – judge on the United States Court of Appeals for the District of Columbia Circuit
- Elizabeth Warren – bankruptcy expert and senior United States senator from Massachusetts
- Joseph H. H. Weiler – European law expert

=== Notable alumni ===
- Charles J. Beerstecher (LL.B. 1870), delegate to California's Second Constitutional Convention, member of the California Railroad Commission
- John Robert Brown – judge of the United States Court of Appeals for the Fifth Circuit, one of the Fifth Circuit Four
- Michael T. Cahill – dean of Brooklyn Law School
- Roger Carter (LL.M., 1968) – dean of University of Saskatchewan College of Law; recipient of the Order of Canada
- William W. Cook (J.D. 1882) – heavily published and cited author of textbooks on corporate law; donor of the quadrangle to Michigan
- Ann Coulter (J.D. 1988) – conservative author and commentator
- Jordan Harbinger (J.D. 2006) – broadcaster and talk show host
- George W. Crockett Jr. (LL.B. 1934) – civil rights activist; helped found the National Lawyers Guild. First African American lawyer hired by the Department of Labor. Recorder's Court Judge, Detroit, Michigan, 1966–74; U.S. House of Representatives (D-Mich.), 1980-91.
- Clarence Darrow (attended) – famous trial lawyer; defense counsel in the Scopes Monkey Trial and Leopold and Loeb case
- William R. Day (LL.B. 1870) – United States Secretary of State, 1898; United States Supreme Court Associate Justice, 1903-1922
- John Feikens (J.D.) – politician and judge from the U.S. state of Michigan. He was the Senior Judge, U.S. District Court for the Eastern District of Michigan (1986-present). Feikens had the unusual honor of being nominated to the same district court by three presidents.
- Harold Ford Jr. (J.D. 1996) – former U.S. Representative from Tennessee; Democratic Leadership Council chair
- Richard Gephardt (J.D. 1965) – U.S. Representative from Missouri (1977-2005). Served as House Majority Leader from 1989 to 1995, and as Minority Leader from 1995 to 2003.
- Ronald M. Gould (J.D. 1973) – judge, the United States Court of Appeals for the Ninth Circuit
- James P. Hoffa (LL.B. 1966) – President, International Brotherhood of Teamsters
- Sada Jacobson (J.D. 2011) – Olympic fencing silver and bronze medalist
- Valerie Jarrett, (J.D. 1981) – Senior Advisor to President Barack Obama
- Amalya Lyle Kearse (J.D. 1962) – judge, United States Court of Appeals for the Second Circuit
- Cornelia Groefsema Kennedy (J.D. 1947) – Senior Judge, United States Court of Appeals for the Sixth Circuit
- Raymond Kethledge (J.D. 1993) – United States circuit judge of the United States Court of Appeals for the Sixth Circuit
- Frank Murphy (LL.B. 1914) – United States Attorney General, 1939, and United States Supreme Court Associate Justice, 1940-1949
- Rob Portman (J.D. 1984) – United States senator from Ohio; former Director of the Office of Management and Budget
- Branch Rickey (LL.B. 1911) – Major League Baseball executive and Hall of Famer; created the modern minor league system and signed Jackie Robinson to a contract, breaking the sport's 20th-century color line
- Richard Riordan (J.D. 1956) – mayor of Los Angeles, 1993-2001
- Ken Salazar (J.D. 1981) – former U.S. Senator from Colorado and United States Secretary of the Interior, 2009-2013
- Rick Snyder (J.D. 1982) – former CEO of Gateway; former Governor of Michigan
- George Sutherland (attended 1891) – United States Supreme Court Justice
- John D. Voelker (J.D. 1928) – justice of the Michigan Supreme Court; author of Anatomy of a Murder.
- Moses Fleetwood Walker (attended 1881–1882) – baseball player and author; first African-American to play major league professional baseball
- Sarah Killgore Wertman (LAW: LLB 1871) – née Sarah Killgore, the first woman to be admitted to the bar of any state in the United States of America
- Sam Zell (J.D. 1966) – real estate development tycoon; founder of EQ Office; former National Association of Real Estate Investment Trusts chairman and current chairman and majority owner of the Tribune Company; billionaire

== See also ==
- List of University of Michigan law and government alumni
- List of University of Michigan legislator alumni
- List of University of Michigan alumni

== Notes ==
1. University of Michigan: Diversity Research & Resources, Proposal 2 Information. Link to UM website
2. Coalition to Defend Affirmative Action v. Granholm, No. 2:06-cv-15024 (E.D. Mi.) (Lawson); Nos. 06–2640, 06–2642 (6th Cir. 2007).
3. January 10, 2007 statement by Dean Evan Caminker.
