= List of University of Michigan legislator alumni =

The following is a list of University of Michigan legislator alumni. For more alumni, see the List of University of Michigan alumni, and University of Michigan.

Where the date or fact of graduation is uncertain, "(MDNG)" is used to indicate "matriculated, did not graduate."

== A ==
- J. Leroy Adair (LAW: JD 1911), congressional representative from Illinois
- Edward Payson Allen (LAW: JD 1867), congressional representative from Michigan
- Gideon Winans Allen (LAW: 1864), Wisconsin state assemblyman
- John Beard Allen (LAW: 1869?), delegate from the Territory of Washington and senator from Washington
- Leo Elwood Allen (AB 1923), congressional representative from Illinois
- Justin Amash (LAW: JD 2005), congressional representative from Michigan's 3rd congressional district
- Clinton Presba Anderson (AB ??), congressional representative and senator from New Mexico
- Daniel Read Anthony, Jr. (MDNG?), congressional representative from Kansas
- Henry Fountain Ashurst (MDNG), senator from Arizona

== B ==
- Donald Allen Bailey (BA 1967), congressional representative from Pennsylvania
- Joseph Edward Baird (LAW: JD 1893), congressional representative from Ohio
- Lucien Baker (LAW: JD), senator from Kansas
- Bert Andrew Bandstra (AB 1953), congressional representative from Iowa
- Henry Towne Bannon (AB 1889), congressional representative from Ohio
- Samuel Willard Beakes (LAW: JD 1883), congressional representative from Michigan
- Rand Beers (MA 1970)
- Alvin Morell Bentley (AB 1940, MA 1963), served as vice consul and secretary with the United States Diplomatic Corps in Mexico
- Michael D. Bishop (A.B. 1989), State of Michigan Senate majority leader
- Roswell Peter Bishop (1868–1872) (LAW: JD 1875), congressional representative from Michigan
- William Wallace Blackney (LAW: JD 1912), congressional representative from Michigan
- Melvin Morella Boothman (LAW: JD 1871), congressional representative from Ohio
- William Patterson Borland (LAW: JD 1892), congressional representative from Missouri
- Samuel Myron Brainerd (LAW), congressional representative from Pennsylvania
- Abraham Lincoln Brick (LAW: JD 1883), congressional representative from Indiana
- William McNulty Brodhead (LAW: JD 1967), congressional representative from Michigan
- Marriott Brosius (LAW), congressional representative from Pennsylvania
- Arthur Brown (LAW: JD 1864), senator from Utah
- Charles Bruce Brownson (AB 1935), congressional representative from Indiana
- Ferdinand Brucker (LAW: JD 1881), congressional representative from Michigan
- William John Bulow (LAW: JD 1893), senator from South Dakota
- Anson Burlingame (MDNG? 1838–1841), congressional representative from Massachusetts

== C ==
- Benjamin Taylor Cable (AB 1876), congressional representative from Illinois
- Martha Hughes Cannon (MED: 1880), on November 3, 1896, became the first woman elected as a state senator in the United States
- William Randolph Carpenter (LAW: JD 1917), congressional representative from Kansas
- William Wallace Chalmers (AB 1887), congressional representative from Ohio
- Walter Marion Chandler (AB 1897), congressional representative from New York
- John Logan Chipman (1843–1845), congressional representative from Michigan
- Ralph Edwin Church (AB 1907), congressional representative from Illinois
- Robert Henry Clancy (AB 1907, LAW: DNG?), congressional representative from Michigan
- Kit Francis Clardy (LAW: JD 1925), congressional representative from Michigan
- Raymond Francis Clevenger (LAW: JD 1952), congressional representative from Michigan
- George Pierre Codd (AB 1891), congressional representative from Michigan
- Don Byron Colton (LAW: 1905), congressional representative from Utah
- George Hamilton Combs, Jr. (MDNG), congressional representative from Missouri
- Solomon Gilman Comstock (MDNG), congressional representative from Minnesota
- Michael Francis Conry (LAW: JD 1896), congressional representative from New York
- Allen Foster Cooper (LAW: JD 1888), congressional representative from Pennsylvania
- Royal Samuel Copeland (MED: MD 1889), senator from New York
- John Kissig Cowen (LAW: ??), congressional representative from Maryland
- William Elijah Cox (LAW: JD 1889), congressional representative from Indiana
- Louis Convers Cramton (LAW: JD 1899), congressional representative from Michigan
- Philip Miller Crane (MDNG), congressional representative from Illinois
- Fred Lewis Crawford, congressional representative from Michigan
- George William Crockett, Jr. (LAW: JD 1934), congressional representative from Michigan
- Maurice Edgar Crumpacker (LAW: JD 1909), elected as a congressional representative to the Sixty-ninth and Seventieth Congresses
- Shepard J. Crumpacker, Jr. (LAW: JD 1941), congressional representative from Indiana
- Paul Harvey Cunningham (LSA: AB 1914; LAW: JD 1915), congressional representative from Iowa
- Gilbert Archibald Currie (LAW: JD 1905), congressional representative from Michigan
- Byron M. Cutcheon (AB 1861, LAW: JD 1866), congressional representative from Michigan

== D–E ==
- Archibald Bard Darragh (1857–1858, AB 1868), congressional representative from Michigan
- Cushman Kellogg Davis (AB 1857), senator from Minnesota
- Stephen Albion Day (AB 1905), congressional representative from Illinois
- Marion De Vries (LAW: JD 1888), congressional representative from California
- John Richard Dellenback (LAW: JD 1949), congressional representative from Oregon
- Gerrit John Diekema (LAW: JD 1883), congressional representative from Michigan
- Charles Coles Diggs, Jr. (1940–1942), congressional representative from Michigan
- Francis Henry Dodds (LAW: JD 1880), congressional representative from Michigan
- Sheridan Downey (LAW: JD 1907), elected as a Democrat to the United States Senate
- Robert Blackford Duncan (LAW: LLB 1948), congressional representative from Oregon
- Warren Joseph Duffey (LAW: JD 1911), congressional representative from Ohio
- Robert F. Ellsworth (LAW: JD 1949), congressional representative from Kansas
- Abdul El-Sayed (BS: 2007), Senator-elect from Michigan.
- Marvin Leonel Esch (AB, MA 1951, Ph. D 1957), congressional representative from Michigan
- Robert Emory Evans (LAW: JD 1886), congressional representative from Nebraska

== F–G ==
- John Franklin Farnsworth, congressional representative from Illinois
- Homer Samuel Ferguson (AB 1913), senator from Michigan
- Woodbridge N. Ferris (MED: MD 1874), senator from Michigan
- Peter G. Fitzgerald (LAW: JD 1986), senator from Illinois
- George Ford (LAW: JD 1869), congressional representative from Indiana
- Gerald Rudolph Ford, Jr. (AB 1935), congressional representative from Michigan, vice president, and thirty-eighth president of the United States
- Harold Ford, Jr. (LAW: JD 1996), congressional representative from Tennessee
- Hiram Robert Fowler (LAW: JD 1884), congressional representative from Illinois
- Louis Frey, Jr. (LAW: JD 1961), congressional representative from Florida
- Frank Ballard Fulkerson (LAW: MDNG), congressional representative from Missouri
- Harry Conrad Gahn (LAW: JD 1904), congressional representative from Ohio
- John James Gardner (LAW: 1866, 1867), congressional representative from New Jersey
- Richard Andrew Gephardt (LAW: JD 1965), congressional representative from Missouri
- Ernest Willard Gibson (LAW: 1899), congressional representative and senator from Vermont
- Joseph John Gill (LAW: JD 1868), congressional representative from Ohio
- Paul Gillmor (LAW: JD 1964), congressional representative, Ohio 5th
- Paul Eugene Gillmor (LAW: JD 1964), congressional representative from Ohio
- Robert Henry Gittins (LAW: JD 1900), congressional representative from New York
- Dan Glickman (BA History 1966), congressional representative from Kansas
- James Stephen Golden (LAW: LLB 1916), congressional representative from Kentucky
- Stephen Goldsmith (LAW: JD 1971), mayor of Indianapolis 1992–99; US Army Reserve 1968–74
- James William Good (LAW: JD 1893), congressional representative from Iowa
- William Gordon (LAW: JD 1893), congressional representative from Ohio
- James Sedgwick Gorman (LAW: JD 1876), congressional representative from Michigan
- Jim Graham (LAW: JD), Democrat representing Ward 1
- Levi Thomas Griffin (AB 1857, LAW:), congressional representative from Michigan
- Robert Paul Griffin (LAW: JD 1950), congressional representative and senator from Michigan
- Martha Wright Griffiths (LAW: JD 1940), congressional representative from Michigan

== H–J ==
- William Flavius Lester Hadley (LAW: JD 1871), congressional representative from Illinois
- John Eugene Harding (AB 1900), congressional representative from Ohio
- Darius Dodge Hare (LAW: JD 1964), congressional representative from Ohio
- Byron Berry Harlan (LAW: JD 1909; LS&A: 1911), congressional representative from Ohio
- William H. Harries (LAW: JD 1868), congressional representative from Minnesota
- Philip Aloysius Hart (Law: JD 1937), senator from Michigan
- Dow Watters Harter (LAW: JD 1907), congressional representative from Ohio
- James Harvey (LAW: LLB 1948), congressional representative from Michigan
- Nils Pederson Haugen (LAW: JD 1874), congressional representative from Wisconsin
- Walter Ingalls Hayes (LAW: JD 1863), congressional representative from Iowa
- Guy T. Helvering (LAW: JD 1906), congressional representative from Kansas
- Charles Belknap Henderson (LAW: JD 1895), senator from Nevada
- John Earl Henderson (LAW: JD 1942), congressional representative from Ohio
- Joseph Lister Hill, congressional representative and senator from Alabama
- William Henry Hinebaugh, congressional representative from Illinois
- John Carl Williams Hinshaw (BUS: MDNG), congressional representative from California
- Gilbert Monell Hitchcock (LAW: JD 1881), congressional representative and senator from Nebraska
- Peter Hoekstra (BUS: MBA 1977), congressional representative from Michigan
- Adoniram Judson Holmes (LAW: JD 1867), congressional representative from Iowa
- Craig Hosmer (MDNG), representative from California
- Jay Abel Hubbell (AB 1853), congressional representative from Michigan
- William Leonard Hungate (MDNG), congressional representative from Missouri
- J. Edward Hutchinson (AB 1936, LAW: JD 1938), congressional representative from Michigan
- Orange Jacobs (MDNG?), delegate from the Territory of Washington
- Albert Webb Jefferis (LAW: JD 1893), congressional representative from Nebraska
- Adna Romulus Johnson (LAW: JD 1887), congressional representative from Ohio
- Bartel John Jonkman (LAW: JD 1914), congressional representative from Michigan

== K ==
- Marcia Carolyn "Marcy" Kaptur (MA 1974), congressional representative from Ohio
- Nancy Kassebaum (AB 1954), senator from Kansas
- Frank Bateman Keefe (LAW: JD 1910), congressional representative from Wisconsin
- Edwin William Keightley (LAW: JD 1865), congressional representative from Michigan
- Patrick Henry Kelley (LAW: JD 1900), congressional representative from Michigan
- Joseph Morgan Kendall (MDNG), congressional representative from Kentucky
- Mark Kennedy (BUS: MBA 1983), congressional representative in the U.S. Congress from Minnesota
- John Worth Kern (LAW: JD 1869), senator from Indiana
- Winfield Scott Kerr (LAW: JD 1879), congressional representative from Ohio
- Dale Kildee (MA 1962), congressional representative
- Carolyn Cheeks Kilpatrick (MS 1977), congressional representative from Michigan
- Henry Mahlon Kimball (LAW: JD 1904), congressional representative from Michigan
- Moses Pierce Kinkaid (LAW: JD 1876), congressional representative from Nebraska
- Snyder Solomon Kirkpatrick, congressional representative from Kansas
- Milton Kraus (LAW: JD 1886), congressional representative from Indiana

== L ==
- James Laird (LAW: JD 1871), congressional representative from Nebraska
- Frederick Landis (LAW: JD 1895), congressional representative from Indiana
- Oscar John Larson (LAW: JD 1894), congressional representative from Minnesota
- Steven C. LaTourette (BA 1976), congressional representative from Ohio
- Scott Leavitt (MDNG?), congressional representative from Montana
- John Camillus Lehr (LAW: JD 1900), congressional representative from Michigan
- John Jacob Lentz (AB 1882), congressional representative from Ohio
- Elliott Harris Levitas (LAW: 1954–1955), congressional representative from Georgia
- William Lewis (MDNG), congressional representative from Kentucky
- Roland Victor Libonati (AB 1921; LAW: ??), congressional representative from Illinois
- Charles August Lindbergh (LAW: JD 1883), congressional representative from Minnesota
- Cyrus Locher (LAW: MDNG), senator from Ohio
- Oren Ethelbirt Long (AB 1916), senator from Hawaii
- Alfred Lucking (LAW: JD 1878), congressional representative from Michigan

== M ==
- Verner Wright Main (LAW: JD 1914), congressional representative from Michigan
- Carl Edgar Mapes (LAW: 1899), congressional representative from Michigan
- Ernest Whitworth Marland (LAW: JD 1893), congressional representative from Oklahoma
- Eben Wever Martin (LAW: 1879, 1890), congressional representative from South Dakota
- William Cotter Maybury (AB 1870; LAW: 1871), congressional representative from Michigan
- James Henry Mays (LAW: JD 1895), congressional representative from Utah
- Porter James McCumber (LAW: JD 1880), senator from North Dakota
- Jonas Hartzell McGowan (AB 1861), congressional representative from Michigan
- Robert John McIntosh (LAW: JD 1948), congressional representative from Michigan
- James Campbell McLaughlin (AB 1879, LAW: JD 1883), congressional representative from Michigan
- Rolla Coral McMillen (LAW: JD 1906), congressional representative from Illinois
- George Meader (AB 1927; LAW: JD 1931), congressional representative from Michigan
- Rice William Means (LAW: JD 1901), senator from Colorado
- Carrie P. Meek (M.S. 1948), member of the Florida state house of representatives, congressional representative
- George de Rue Meiklejohn (LAW: JD 1880), congressional representative from Nebraska
- David Henry Mercer (LAW: JD 1882), congressional representative from Nebraska
- William Smith Mesick (LAW: JD 1881), congressional representative from Michigan
- Earl Cory Michener (LAW: 1901–1902, DNG), congressional representative from Michigan
- Seth Crittenden Moffatt (LAW: JD 1863), congressional representative from Michigan
- Bernie Moreno (BUS), senator from Ohio
- James William Murphy (LAW: JD 1880), congressional representative from Wisconsin

== N–O ==
- Lucien Norbert Nedzi (BA 1948; LAW: JD 1951), congressional representative 1952
- James Carson Needham (LAW: JD 1889), congressional representative from California
- John Stoughton Newberry (AB 1847), first provost marshal for the State of Michigan
- Edward Thomas Noonan (LAW: 1883?), congressional representative from Illinois
- Charles Gibb Oakman (AB 1926), congressional representative from Michigan
- James Grant O'Hara (AB 1954, LAW: JD 1955), congressional representative from Michigan
- John Henry O'Neall (LAW: JD 1864), congressional representative from Indiana
- Theobald Otjen (LAW: JD 1875), congressional representative from Wisconsin
- James W. Owens (LAW: 1864–1865), congressional representative from Ohio

== P–Q ==
- Jasper Packard (AB 1955), congressional representative from Indiana
- Thomas Witherell Palmer (MDNG), senator from Michigan
- Seymour Howe Person (AB 1901), congressional representative from Michigan
- Samuel Ritter Peters (LAW: JD 1867), congressional representative from Kansas
- Augustus Herman Pettibone (AB 1859), congressional representative from Tennessee
- William Wallace Phelps (AB 1846), congressional representative from Minnesota
- John Alfred Pickler (LAW: JD 1872), congressional representative from South Dakota
- Walter Marcus Pierce (MDNG?), congressional representative from Oregon
- Frank Plumley (LAW), congressional representative from Vermont
- John Edward Porter (LAW: JD 1961), congressional representative from Illinois
- Robert Jones "Rob" Portman (LAW: JD 1984), lawyer, junior United States senator from Ohio
- Tom Price (BA 1976; MED: MD 1979), congressional representative from Georgia
- Joseph Very Quarles (AB 1966; LAW: JD 1867), senator from Wisconsin

== R ==
- Clark T. Randt (BA, MED: MD), U.S. congressman
- Henry Augustus Reeves (MDNG), congressional representative from New York
- John Birchard Rice (MED: 1857), congressional representative from Ohio
- Donald Wayne Riegle, Jr. (AB 1960), congressional representative and senator from Michigan
- Dick Riordan (LAW: JD 1956), mayor of Los Angeles 1993–2001
- Lynn Nancy Rivers (BA 1987), congressional representative from Michigan
- Mike Rogers (MDNG), congressional representative, Michigan 8th
- Philip Edward Ruppe (MDNG 1944–1946), congressional representative from Michigan
- Jon Daniel Runyan, 2010 congressional representative for New Jersey's 3rd congressional district

== S ==
- Ken Salazar (LAW: JD 1981), senator from Colorado, secretary of the interior
- John J. H. (Joe) Schwarz (BA 1959), congressional representative from Michigan
- Frank Douglas Scott (LAW: JD 1901), congressional representative from Michigan
- John Franklin Shafroth (AB 1875), congressional representative and senator from Colorado
- William Graves Sharp (LAW: JD 1881), congressional representative from Ohio
- John M. C. Smith (AB 1879, LAW: JD 1880), congressional representative from Michigan
- Samuel William Smith (LAW: JD 1878), congressional representative from Michigan
- Horace Greeley Snover (AB 1969; LAW: JD 1871), congressional representative from Michigan
- Neil Oliver Staebler (BA 1926), congressional representative from Michigan
- Robert Theodore Stafford (AB), congressional representative and senator from Vermont
- Ozora P. Stearns (AB 1858, LAW: JD 1860), senator from Minnesota
- K. William Stinson (AB 1952), congressional representative from Washington
- Byron Gray Stout (AB 1851), congressional representative from Michigan
- George Sutherland (LAW), congressional representative and senator from Utah
- Edwin Forrest Sweet (LAW: JD 1874), congressional representative from Michigan
- Oscar William Swift (AB: ca 1895?), congressional representative from New York

== T ==
- John Charles Tarsney (LAW: JD 1869), congressional representative from Missouri
- Timothy Edward Tarsney (LAW: JD 1872), congressional representative from Michigan
- Edward Thomas Taylor (LAW: JD 1884), congressional representative from Colorado
- Charles Spalding Thomas (LAW: JD 1871), senator from Colorado
- Henry Franklin Thomas (MED: 1868), congressional representative from Michigan
- Charles A. Towne (AB 1881), congressional representative and senator from Minnesota; representative from New York
- Charles Elroy Townsend (MDNG), congressional representative and senator from Michigan
- Jerald F. ter Horst, AB 1947, Gerald Ford's short-term press secretary

== U–Z ==
- Lauren Underwood (BS 2008), congressional representative from Illinois
- Frederick Stephen Upton (BA 1975), congressional representative from Michigan
- Arthur Hendrick Vandenberg (LAW: 1900–1901), senator from Michigan
- Guy Adrian Vander Jagt (LAW: JD 1960), congressional representative from Michigan
- Bird J. Vincent (LAW: JD 1905), congressional representative from Michigan
- Weston Edward Vivian (Ph. D. 1959), congressional representative from Michigan
- James Franklin Ware (LAW: 1873), Wisconsin State Assembly and Senate
- William Warner (LAW: 1861?), congressional representative and senator from Missouri
- Thad F. Wasielewski (BA 1927), congressional representative from Wisconsin
- Charles Winfield Waterman (LAW: JD 1889), senator from Colorado
- Thomas Addis Emmet Weadock (LAW: JD 1873), congressional representative from Michigan
- John Stanley Webster (LAW: 1897–1899), congressional representative from Washington
- William Walter Wedemeyer (LAW: JD 1895), congressional representative from Michigan
- Alvin F. Weichel (MDNG), congressional representative from Ohio
- Carl May Weideman (MDNG), congressional representative from Michigan
- Adonijah Strong Welch (AB 1846), senator from Florida
- Benjamin Franklin Welty (AB 1896), congressional representative from Ohio
- Charles Stuart Wharton (LAW: 1896), congressional representative from Illinois
- Burton Kendall Wheeler (LAW: JD 1905), senator from Montana
- John Jefferson Whitacre (MDNG), congressional representative from Ohio
- John Daugherty White (LAW: JD 1872; MED), congressional representative from Kentucky
- Robert Henry Whitelaw (LAW: 1873?), congressional representative from Missouri
- Justin Rice Whiting (MDNG: 1863–1865), congressional representative from Michigan
- Alexander Wiley (MDNG?), senator from Wisconsin
- Edwin Willits (AB 1955), congressional representative from Michigan
- Edgar Wilson (LAW: JD 1884), congressional representative from Idaho
- William Warfield Wilson, congressional representative from Illinois
- Thomas Jefferson Wood (LAW: JD 1867), congressional representative from Indiana
- William Robert Wood (LAW: JD 1882), congressional representative from Indiana
- Rebecca Young (1955), Wisconsin State Assembly
