= Redox Biology =

- Discipline: Free radicals biology
- Language: English
- Edited by: Tilman Grune and Christopher Kevil

Publication details
- History: Published since 2013
- Publisher: Elsevier (Netherlands)
- Frequency: Monthly
- Open access: Yes
- Impact factor: 16.2 (2025)

Standard abbreviations
- ISO 4: Redox Biol.

Indexing
- ISSN: 2213-2317

Links
- Journal homepage; Online access

Redox Biology is an open-access peer-reviewed scientific journal and an official journal of the Society for Redox Biology and Medicine and the Society for Free Radical Research-Europe. The journal covers research on redox biology, aging, signaling, biological chemistry and medical implications of free radicals for health and disease. According to the Journal Citation Reports, the journal's 2025 impact factor is 16.2.

== Abstracting and indexing ==
The journal is abstracted and indexed in ADONIS, BIOSIS, CAB Abstracts, Chemical Abstracts, Current Contents, EMBASE, EMBiology, MEDLINE, Science Citation Index, Scopus and Toxicology Abstracts.
