= Edward H. Cooper =

American lawyer

- Occupation: Law professor
- Title: Thomas M. Cooley Professor of Law

Academic background
- Education: Dartmouth College (A.B.); Harvard Law School (LL.B.)

Edward Hayes Cooper is the Thomas M. Cooley Professor of Law Emeritus at the University of Michigan Law School. He is a leading scholar of civil procedure and federal jurisdiction. Cooper is among the most widely cited authorities in civil procedure.

== Career ==
Cooper's hometown is Detroit, Michigan. Cooper received his A.B. in economics from Dartmouth College and his LL.B. from Harvard Law School. He was a law clerk to Judge Clifford Patrick O'Sullivan of the U.S. Court of Appeals for the Sixth Circuit before practicing law in Detroit. He was admitted to practice in Michigan on January 5, 1965.

Cooper's first teaching job was as an adjunct professor at Wayne State University in Detroit. Following this, he was associate professor at the University of Minnesota Law School for five years before joining the Michigan Law school faculty in 1972. He was named the Thomas M. Cooley Professor of Law in 1988. His predecessor in the chair was John W. Reed. At Michigan, Cooper teaches civil procedure and jurisdiction and choice of law, and other courses. In the past, he also taught antitrust.

Cooper is the co-author, with Charles Alan Wright and Arthur R. Miller, of the first, second, and third editions of Federal Practice & Procedure, the leading legal treatise on federal jurisdiction and procedure. The first version of the treatise was published in 1975.

Cooper served as a member of the Advisory Committee on Civil Rules of the Judicial Conference of the United States from 1991 to 1992, and has been reporter for that committee since 1992. Cooper has been a member of the Council of the American Law Institute since 1988 and has served as adviser to the ALI Federal Judicial Code, International Jurisdiction and Judgments, and Transnational Procedure projects.

Cooper is married, and he and his wife have two children and three grandchildren.
