= Winship Cancer Institute =

U.S. cancer research and care center

Winship Cancer Institute of Emory University

Geography
- Location: Atlanta, Georgia, USA
- Coordinates: 33°47′34″N 84°19′10″W

Organisation
- Care system: Public
- Type: Specialist
- Affiliated university: Emory University, Emory University School of Medicine, NCI-designated Cancer Center

Services
- Beds: 587
- Speciality: Cancer

History
- Founded: 1937; 89 years ago

Links
- Website: winshipcancer.emory.edu

Winship Cancer Institute of Emory University is a nonprofit cancer research and patient care center based in Atlanta, Georgia. Winship Cancer Institute is the only National Cancer Institute-designated Comprehensive Cancer Center in Georgia.

== History ==
The Robert Winship Clinic was established in 1937 through a gift to Emory of $50,000 from Coca-Cola CEO Robert W. Woodruff, who named the center after his maternal grandfather, Robert Winship, in honor of his mother, Emily Winship, who died from breast cancer. Woodruff's vision was to create a center in Georgia that focuses on research, education and patient care. The Robert W. Woodruff Foundation, Inc. has continued to support Emory in achieving this vision, and in 2003 Emory dedicated the 275,000-square-foot (25,500 m^{2}) Winship Cancer Institute building, constructed with funds from the Robert W. Woodruff Foundation, Inc.

== Locations ==
Winship Cancer Institute is located on the campus of Emory University in Atlanta, Georgia. Affiliate locations include Emory University Hospital, Emory University Hospital Midtown, Emory Johns Creek Hospital, Emory Saint Joseph's Hospital, Emory Decatur Hospital and Emory Hillandale Hospital. Faculty members from Winship Cancer Institute also provide medical care at Grady Memorial Hospital and the Atlanta VA Medical Center.

The Emory Proton Therapy Center, opened in December 2018, is Georgia's only proton therapy facility serving patients with cancer in Atlanta and the Southeastern U.S. with care managed by radiation oncologists from Winship Cancer Institute.

Winship at Emory Midtown, a 17-story cancer care center, opened in May 2023 on the Emory University Hospital Midtown campus.

== Research and treatment ==
In 2014, Winship Cancer Institute was selected as a Lead Academic Participating Site for the National Cancer Institute's National Clinical Trials Network.

In 2019, Winship Cancer Institute was awarded a five-year, $9.7 million Specialized Program of Research Excellence (SPORE) grant from the National Cancer Institute, the first grant of its kind to be awarded in the state of Georgia, to study new approaches for lung cancer treatment.

Supported by gifts from the Wilbur and Hilda Glenn Family Foundation and Southern Company, Winship Cancer Institute launched the Winship Center for Cancer Health Equity Research in 2023 to focus research efforts on eliminating cancer disparities in Georgia and nationwide.

== Recognition ==
Emory University Hospital is ranked one of "America's Best Hospitals" for cancer by U.S. News & World Report.

== Controversies ==
In the aftermath of the 2025–2026 Iranian protests and ensuing 2026 Iran massacres, 2026 Internet blackout in Iran, and 2026 Iranian diaspora protests, a group of Iranian Americans in Atlanta, Georgia protested the employment of Fatemeh Ardeshir-Larijani, daughter of Ali Larijani, outside her place of employment at the Winship Cancer Institute. Ali Larijani has been described as the mastermind of the massacres, according to former Iranian government officials. Fatemeh Ardeshir-Larijani was fired from her position following the protests. Buddy Carter, a Republican congressman for the state of Georgia, has demanded that Ardeshir-Larijani's medical license to treat patients in the United States be revoked, calling it a threat to national security.

== Notable persons ==
- Rafi Ahmed – Virologist and immunologist. Co-Leader of the Cancer Immunology Program.
- Max Dale Cooper – Immunologist. Co-discoverer of T cells and B cells
- Reshma Jagsi - Radiation oncologist and expert in breast cancer and bioethics research. Chair of Radiation Oncology.
- Jonathan S. Lewin – Neuroradiologist. Member of the Discovery and Developmental Therapeutics Program.
- Sagar Lonial – Hematologist specializing in multiple myeloma. Chief Medical Officer of Winship Cancer Institute.
- Suresh Ramalingam - Medical oncologist expert in lung cancer. Executive Director of Winship Cancer Institute.

== See also ==
- Emory Healthcare
- Emory University
- Emory University School of Medicine
- Nell Hodgson Woodruff School of Nursing
- Rollins School of Public Health
