= Aaron Dworkin =

American violinist and music educator (born 1970)

- Born: September 11, 1970 (age 56); Monticello, New York, U.S.
- Education: University of Michigan
- Title: Founder of the Sphinx Organization
- Musical career
- Genre: Classical
- Occupations: Violinist; music educator
- Instrument: Violin
- Website: aarondworkin.com

Aaron Paul Dworkin (born September 11, 1970) is an American violinist and music educator. He founded the Sphinx Organization to foster diversity in classical music.

== Early life ==
Dworkin was born on September 11, 1970 in Monticello, New York, to Vaughn and Audeen Moore, but they were forced to give their son up for adoption. His biological mother is of Irish descent and his biological father is African-American. When he was two weeks old, he was adopted by Barry and Susan Dworkin. The Dworkins were both New York City College professors, with a specialization in neuroscience. Susan had been an amateur violinist before Aaron's adoption, and when he was about five years old, she began to play again. She played Bach pieces which gave Aaron an interest in music. At age 10, his parents moved the family from Manhattan to Hershey, Pennsylvania because they both got jobs at the Hershey Medical Center.

In his youth, he attended the Peabody Institute and Philadelphia's New School of Music. By his teens, he was performing regularly with the Hershey Youth Orchestra and the Harrisburg Youth Symphony. For his junior and senior year of high school, he attended the Interlochen Arts Academy, after his parents convinced him he needed to transfer. He had been unhappy about attending his other high school because he'd encountered racial prejudice.

== College career ==
Dworkin enrolled at Penn State, where he was concertmaster for the Penn State Philharmonic Orchestra. He was enrolled as a business major, however, and he withdrew without earning a degree for financial reasons.

He then decided to move to Michigan. He worked until he obtained enough funds to attend the University of Michigan. He graduated from the University of Michigan School of Music, Theatre & Dance, with a bachelor's degree (in 1997) and a Master's of Music in violin performance, graduating with high honors in 1998.

== Career ==
Inspired by the works of William Grant Still, Dworkin realized there was a lack of minorities involved in classical music. He created the Sphinx Organization to help reflect the diversity in the United States in orchestras. He is the founder and former president of the Sphinx Organization.

He became dean of the University of Michigan School of Music, Theatre & Dance on July 20, 2015. On April 5, 2017, he announced his resignation as dean at the conclusion of the 2016–17 academic year planning to focus on his family. He currently serves as a Professor of Arts Leadership & Entrepreneurship at the university.

Dworkin has written a variety of books and worked on a multitude of creative projects. He has authored a children's book, a science fiction novel, two memoirs, and a book entitled The Entrepreneurial Artist: Lessons from Highly Successful Creatives. His film, An American Prophecy, won an Emmy Award and honors from multiple festivals. He also created a digital art project entitled Fractured History.

Dworkin has received a variety of appointments and honors. He was President Obama’s first appointment to the National Council on the Arts and is a member of President Biden’s Arts Policy Committee. Additionally, Dworkin is a member of the American Academy of Arts and Sciences, the Academy of American Poets and the Recording Academy. He is on the APB speakers bureau’s roster and regularly serves as the keynote speaker at universities and conferences.

He has served on the Board of Directors and Advisory Boards for multiple arts organizations including the National Council on the Arts, Knight Foundation, Motown Museum, National Association of Performing Arts Professionals, Avery Fisher Artist Program, Independent Sector, League of American Orchestras, Ann Arbor Area Foundation, Michigan Theater and Chamber Music America.

== Poetjournalism ==
Poetjournalism, as termed by Aaron Dworkin, is “the research, creation, and distribution of writing that evokes an emotional connection to news-related subjects or other relevant ideas utilizing elements of sound, meter, rhythm and/or creative illustration”. Poetjournalism focuses on discussing important societal issues, which is a common theme in poetry.

Dworkin holds the title of Poetjournalist-in-Residence at several organizations, including The Rodham Institute at George Washington University, the City of Ann Arbor’s Bicentennial, Grantmakers in the Arts, the Max M. & Marjorie S. Fisher Foundation, the Wright Museum of African American History, Ovation TV Network, Complexions Contemporary Ballet and Shar Music. His pieces created in collaboration with these organizations focus on the specific societal issues that each organization aims to impact.

In 2024, Dworkin founded The Institute for Poetjournalism, which organizes a competition and serves as a news bureau for poetjournalism. The organization’s Dworkin Prize offers the competition winner a $150,000 award, larger than any other prize in poetry and journalism. The prize honors the impact of poetry and journalism.

Dworkin is the author of multiple poetry collections and has performed spoken-word poetry across the United States. His collections include The Poetjournalist and They Said I Wasn’t Really Black. As a spoken-word artist, he has performed his poetry at Carnegie Hall, Galapagos Theater in New York, Harvard University, Chautauqua, University of Michigan, Minneapolis Orchestra Hall, NJPAC, the Wright Museum, Orchestra Hall and more.

== Awards ==
- 2003 Michigan Governors Award for Arts & Culture
- 2003 Michiganian of the Year, Detroit News
- 2005 MacArthur Fellows Program
- 2006 Newsweek Giving Back Award
- MLK Spirit Award
- 2013 Honorary Member of the Royal Philharmonic Society
- National Governors Association Distinguished Service to State Government Award
- BET’s History Makers in the Making Award
- Detroit Symphony Orchestra’s Lifetime Achievement Award
- National Black MBA’s Entrepreneur of the Year
- Honorary Doctorate of Humane Letters from Skidmore College in 2025, 114th Commencement

== Discography ==
- Ebony Rhythm Ethnovibe
- Bar-Talk. Ethnovibe

== Personal life ==
Dworkin is married to Afa Sadykhly Dworkin and has two children, Noah Still and Amani Jaise.

== Sources ==
- "Aaron Dworkin 1970-". Biography Today. 16 (2). Omnigraphics, Inc. 2007. ISSN 1058-2347.
