= Sphinx Organization =

Musical organization

- Formation: 1996
- Type: Non-profit
- Purpose: Development of young Black and Latino classical musicians
- Location: Detroit, Michigan
- Region served: United States
- President and Artistic Director: Afa S. Dworkin
- Website: sphinxmusic.org

The Sphinx Organization is a non-profit organization dedicated to the development of young Black and Latino classical musicians. Based in Detroit, Michigan, it was founded by the American violinist Aaron Dworkin. The Sphinx was chosen to represent this organization because of what it symbolizes: "the power, wisdom and persistence" that the organization hopes to instill in its participants.

== History ==
At age 25, Aaron P. Dworkin began the Sphinx Competition. While he was immediately met with skepticism from his violin teacher and the dean of the University of Michigan School of Music, his passion about the endeavor won them over. He was allotted $40,000 over the course of three years from the dean, Dr. Paul Boylan and gained grant money from other organizations including Ann Arbor Area Community Foundation, Ford Motor Co., Masco Corp., and the Wolfensohn Family Foundation. In January 2010 the Sphinx Competition celebrated its 13th year. Since the start of the first annual competition, Sphinx has also begun a number of other programs to help the growth of minority involvement in classical music.

== Music ensembles ==
The Sphinx Organization has supported the formation of six ensembles. The organization itself has an orchestra known as the Sphinx Symphony Orchestra, composed of Black and Latinx professionals from around the U.S. The other groups formed are the Catalyst Quartet, Harlem Quartet, Sphinx Honors Orchestra, Sphinx Virtuosi, and most recently, the Exigence Vocal Ensemble. The Sphinx Virtuosi is a professional chamber orchestra, and Exigence is a professional vocal ensemble highlighting Black and Latinx artistry. The Catalyst Quartet comprises Sphinx Competition laureates and alumni, and the Harlem Quartet comprises first-place competition winners.

== Annual Sphinx Competition ==
The Annual Sphinx Competition began in 1997. The Sphinx Competition give Black and Latino classical string players a chance to compete, work with an internationally renowned panel of judges and to perform with professional musicians. Prizes include over $100,000 in scholarships and cash prizes, as well as solo performances with major orchestras across the United States. Many of the past laureates have gone on to either study at very prestigious schools or began careers in solo or orchestra playing. Notable judges include Anthony Elliot, Sanford Allen, Atar Arad, Paul Katz, and Kim Kashkashian.

== Outreach programs ==
The Sphinx Organization is known not only for its annual competition, but also for the education it provides across the United States. Its outreach programs are free, non-profit programs aimed at developing interest and education towards classical music in urban underserved areas in the United States. These programs include: Musical Encounters, School Dayz, Sphinx Preparatory Institute, Sphinx Performance Academy, and Sphinx Journeys. Musical Encounters creates opportunities for children to encounter the instruments of the orchestra and learn more about them at school. School Dayz is a program in which the Harlem Quartet visits schools in New York to provide exposure for elementary school children to classical music through performance. The Sphinx Preparatory Institute is a program offering Saturday classes to Detroit students in music history, theory, and instrumental performance. It serves string, woodwind, brass, percussion, and piano instrumentalists, ages 11–18 and is designed to address the needs of students in pursuit of music studies at beginning and intermediate levels who lack access to adequate training. The Sphinx Performance Academy is a music festival held by the Sphinx Organization in which Black and Latino students ages 12–17 study with the Harlem Quartet and other Sphinx Competition alumni. During their time at the Academy, students receive both private and masterclass instruction in chamber and solo music. Finally, Sphinx Journeys is a program that founder Aaron Dworkin hosts. It is a radio show that highlights classical music produced by Black and Latino musicians. The program is a co-production with WRCJ-FM in Detroit.

The Sphinx Organization also offers professional development programs and grants. Its annual SphinxConnect conference in Detroit, focused on diversity and inclusion in the arts, launched in 2017 and now attracts nearly a thousand attendees per year, including musicians; administrators; conductors; composers; funders; artist representatives; and students and parents. Major speakers have included Jade Simmons, Martina Arroyo, and Daniel Bernard Roumain. The 2020 conference included the announcement of the first Sphinx Venture Fund grants, part of a $1.5 million investment to transform the future of cultural diversity, equity, and inclusion in the arts. The Sphinx Medal of Excellence is awarded annually to three artists, and includes a $50,000 career grant.

== Finances ==
While the Sphinx Organization began with a modest start financially, it has since grown into a major organization. Between 2006-2008, 80% of the organization's expenses were related to the program itself, while only about 7% went to administrative costs and 10% to fundraising. Growth varied from year to year. While in 2006, primary revenue was 16.6% and rose to 34.2% the next year, in 2008 it fell dramatically to -15.2% due to $1 million lost in contributions while the organization's expenses rose from 27% in 2006 to 35.8% in 2008. Despite these ups and downs, Sphinx had accumulated net assets of over $3 million by 2008. By 2019, its total net assets were $13.9 million.

As of 2016, Sphinx had provided over $1.5 million in artist grants, over $500,000 worth of instruments to students and musicians, over $2.5 million in scholarships to students and musicians, and had commissioned 16 musical works. Its 2019 income was $8.8 million, representing a 145% increase in budget from 2015. Of its $5.3 million in 2019 expenses, 90% went to programming, 2% of administration, and 8% to fundraising.

== Notable alumni ==
- Danielle Belen, violinist
- Joseph Conyers, double bassist
- Harlem Quartet (all members)
- Ilmar Gavilán, violinist
- Kelly Hall-Tompkins, violinist
- Jessie Montgomery, violinist and composer
- Marilyn de Oliveira, cellist
- Elena Urioste, violinist
- Francisco Vila, cellist
