= Charles A. Baird =

American athletic director (1870–1944)

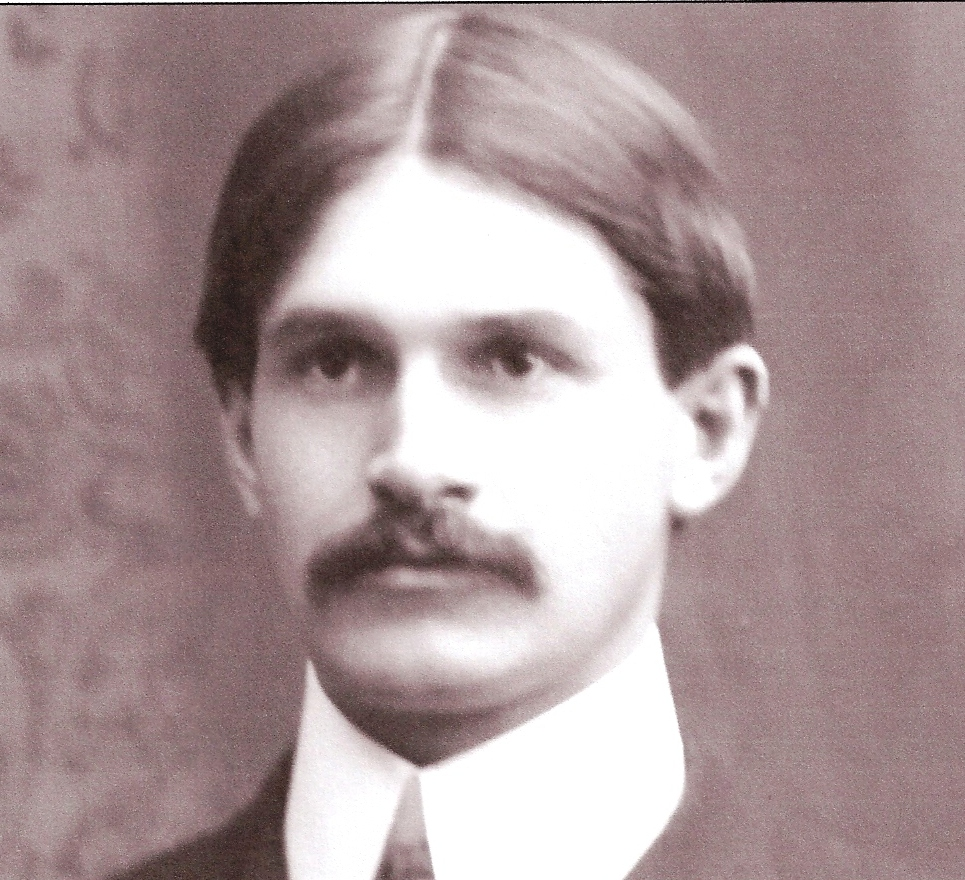
- Baird cropped from 1900 Michigan football team photograph
- Born: January 17, 1870; Vanceburg, Kentucky, U.S.
- Died: November 30, 1944 (aged 74); Kansas City, Missouri, U.S.
- Resting place: Forest Hill Calvary Cemetery; Kansas City, Missouri, U.S.
- Education: University of Michigan
- Occupations: Athletic director; banker
- Known for: First athletic director at University of Michigan, 1898–1909; Donated Baird Carillon to University of Michigan, 1935

Charles A. Baird (January 17, 1870 – November 30, 1944) was an American football manager, university athletic director, and banker.

He was the manager of the University of Michigan football team from 1893 to 1895 and the school's first athletic director from 1898 to 1909. During his time as Michigan's athletic director, he was responsible for the hiring of Coach Fielding H. Yost and the construction of Ferry Field, the largest college athletic grounds in the United States at that time. Michigan teams excelled in all fields of athletics during Baird's tenure at Michigan, including football and track. Michigan's track teams won six Western Conference team championships and 16 Olympic medals (including 7 gold medals) during Baird's eleven years as athletic director. Baird also presided over Michigan athletics for the school's first Western Conference football championship in 1898 and Yost's "point-a-minute" teams from 1901 to 1905. His business acumen has been credited with turning Michigan's athletic department into a major success and a model for other universities in the early 20th century.

Baird became embroiled in controversy in 1905 when Stanford University President David Starr Jordan published allegations that "the firm of Yost & Baird, victory-makers," were engaged in "professionalism" at Michigan. Baird was also a central player in the 1907 withdrawal of the University of Michigan from the Western Conference in protest over strict regulations imposed by conference faculty, including a reduction in the football season to five games (reduced from 13 in 1905) and a fifty cent limit on ticket prices.

Baird left his position as athletic director in 1909 and moved to Kansas City, Missouri where he became a successful banker and investor. In 1935, Baird donated the Charles Baird Carillon, the fourth heaviest carillon in the world, to the University of Michigan.

== Early years ==
Charles Baird enrolled in the University of Michigan in 1890 as a student in the law department. In 1891, he entered the literary department and was elected to the athletic board as its freshman representative. In 1893, he was elected as the manager of the football team and held that position in the 1893, 1894, and 1895 seasons. Despite receiving his A.B. degree in 1895, he was employed as the football team's manager for the ensuing fall, reportedly "by reason of his business ability." His brother, James Baird, who earned an Engineering degree in 1896, played on the football team and was Captain in 1894.

University of Michigan Football
Year	Record	Points Scored	Points Allowed
1893	7–3	278	102
1894	9–1–1	244	84
1895	8–1	266	14
Total	24–5–1	788	200

== Michigan's first athletic director ==
=== 1898 season ===
By 1897, the finances of the Michigan Athletic Association under constantly changing student control were "at a low ebb." In 1898, Baird was asked to return to Ann Arbor as the "graduate manager" or "superintendent" of athletics. Baird was given "complete control of all branches of athletics at Michigan" in order to induce him to return to the school. One of Baird's first moves was to persuade trainer Keene Fitzpatrick to rejoin him at the school. Fitzpatrick had been the trainer of the 1894 and 1895 teams with Baird, but spent the 1896 and 1897 seasons as the trainer for Yale's football team. Gustave Ferbert, who had played on the 1893–1895 teams managed by Baird stayed on as coach in 1898.

The 1898 Wolverines went 10–0 and won the Western Conference (now known as the Big Ten Conference) championship. The 1898 team outscored its opponents 205 to 26, and closed the season with a 12–11 win over Amos Alonzo Stagg's University of Chicago team on November 24, 1898. The game was played in Chicago with a paid attendance of 12,000—the largest crowd to watch a Michigan football game up to that time. The 1898 victory over Chicago served as the inspiration for Louis Elbel to write The Victors, Michigan's fight song. Elbel's lyric, "Champions of the West," refers to Michigan's having won the 1898 Western Conference championship—the first in the school's history.

=== 1899 season ===
Seeking to increase the prestige of Michigan's football program, Baird traveled during the winter of 1899 seeking to arrange games with the country's top teams. In January 1899, he met with representatives of Pennsylvania, Princeton, and Harvard—then considered the top football programs in the country. He succeeded in signing a contract with Penn for a November game in Philadelphia. In February 1899, he traveled to Madison, Wisconsin where he signed a two-year contract for football, baseball and track matches with the University of Wisconsin—a program with which Michigan had cut off relations in 1893.

The 1899 football team finished the season with an 8–2 record, losing 11–10 to Penn in Philadelphia, and 17–5 to Wisconsin. The Wisconsin game, however, was an early demonstration of Baird's business acumen. Baird contracted for the game to be played in Chicago on Thanksgiving. Both schools had a large alumni base in Chicago, and the site was within an easy train ride from each school. As a result, the game drew 18,000 paying spectators—breaking the Michigan attendance record set the prior year in the Chicago game.

When Baird arrived in 1898, the athletic department was $3,000 in debt. By the end of the 1899 season, Baird had paid off the debt and restored the department's credit. In December 1899, Baird was rewarded for his efforts when the university appointed him "director of outdoor athletics," with the rank of junior professor in the university and a salary of $2,000.

=== 1900 season ===
In January 1900, Baird met with Amos Alonzo Stagg in Ann Arbor and negotiated a two-year contract with rival, the University of Chicago, including a Thanksgiving game in Chicago. Though Chicago would be playing at home in 1900, Baird required that Stagg agree to "an equal division of the gate receipts." In May 1900, Baird lost his head football coach, Gustave Ferbert, to the Klondike Gold Rush. Ferbert left Ann Arbor to join "two other prominent Michigan football men" to prospect for gold in Alaska. (Ferbert returned from Alaska in 1908 as a millionaire after striking gold, though these claims are debated by modern historians.) Langdon "Biff" Lea was hired to replace Ferbert as coach for the 1900 football season. Lea had played at Princeton from 1892 to 1895 and was considered one of the greatest football players in Princeton's history. The 1900 team finished in 5th place in the Western Conference with a 7–2–1 record, losing to rival Chicago and to Iowa.

== Yost's "point-a-minute" teams ==
=== Hiring of Fielding Yost ===
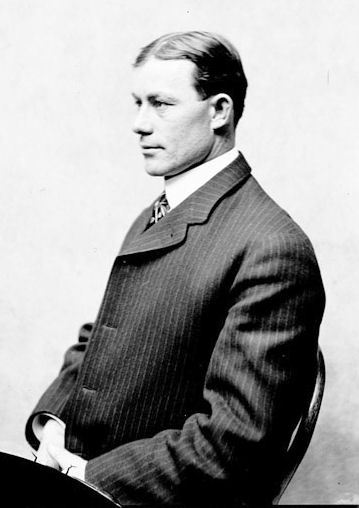
Fielding H. Yost in 1902

In January 1901, Langdon Lea returned to his alma mater, Princeton, as its first "official" football coach. Baird was left without a football coach for the second time in eight months. At the end of the 1900 football season, Stanford University passed a rule requiring all coaches to be alumni. The decision left Stanford's football coach, Fielding H. Yost, who was not an alumnus, without a job. Yost wrote to the University of Illinois in December 1900 seeking a job. Illinois did not have an opening, but the school's athletic director passed along Yost's letter to Baird at Michigan. Baird asked Yost to come to Ann Arbor to interview for the football coaching job. Before leaving for Ann Arbor, Yost sent Baird a box of clippings and scrapbooks. Baird met Yost at the Ann Arbor train station, where Yost is reported to have told Baird, "There are three things that make a winning football team, spirit, manpower and coaching. If your boys love Meeshegan, they've got the spirit, you see. If they turnout, that takes care of the manpower. I'll take care of the coaching." Baird offered Yost the job at a salary of $2,300 (the same as a full professor) for only three months work. Baird reportedly told Yost, "Well, you've got a real job ahead of you. You've got to beat Chicago."

=== 1901 season ===
The 1901 football team is considered by some the greatest Michigan football team of all time. In Yost's first year as coach, Michigan finished 11–0, did not allow a single point to be scored by an opposing team, and outscored its opponents 550–0. The 1901 Wolverines became known as the "point-a-minute" team, as their offensive production resulted in an average of one point being scored every minute. Even after the 1901 season had commenced, Baird continued to seek opportunities to increase revenues from the team's success. In mid-October 1901, Baird signed a contract with the University of Iowa for a Michigan-Iowa game to be played on Thanksgiving Day at Chicago's West Side baseball park. The location was chosen because of the large potential for receipts, as the Michigan-Wisconsin game there in 1899 had generated more than $15,000. In November 1901, Baird issued a public offer that Michigan would play any rival claimant for the Western Conference championship in a post-season game. The proposed game, which would have matched Michigan against the winner of the Minnesota-Wisconsin game, would have allowed for the determination of an undisputed champion, and also presented an opportunity for substantial receipts at the gate. Michigan's offer was reported in the press as "practically a challenge," but the offer was declined.

=== The first Rose Bowl game ===
During the fall of 1901, the organizers of the Tournament of Roses Parade decided to hold a football game in order to bring tourism into the area. Tournament of Roses Association president, James Wagner, guaranteed $3,500 to cover the expenses of bringing the football teams to Pasadena, California. In October 1901, Wagner wrote to Baird, offering to pay Michigan's expenses to travel to play in the game. Baird proved his reputation as a negotiator in his correspondence with Wagner. On October 30, 1901, Baird wrote:

We desire to make the trip to the Pacific coast during the holidays, providing it can be made to pay. The University of Washington has written us in regard to a game at Seattle, and we would be willing to play them there Christmas. We would be glad to play the winner of the Stanford-California game at Los Angeles on New Years day. However, if this trip is made to the coast, it will be necessary for us to secure, in advance, a guarantee of expenses. To play two games it will be necessary for us to carry eighteen players, in addition to the two coaches, trainer and myself, or in other words, we must secure enough to cover the expenses of twenty-two men, traveling in first-class style...

Wagner offered Michigan $2 a day for meal money, to which Baird replied, "We won't come unless we can go comfortably and in reasonable style. We want $3 a day meal money."

Baird's financial demands were met, and Michigan traveled to Pasadena to play in the first Rose Bowl on January 1, 1902. The game featured Michigan playing Stanford, the school which had terminated Yost as its football coach after the 1900 season. The Michigan team compiled a 49–0 lead in the game, and with eight minutes remaining Stanford captain Ralph Fisher asked that the game be stopped, and Michigan agreed. Following the mismatch, Michigan was not invited to play again in the Rose Bowl for 46 years, when it defeated USC by an identical score of 49–0 in the 1948 Rose Bowl.

=== 1902 season ===
Having lost the opportunity to play Wisconsin in a post-season game to settle the championship of the Western Conference in 1901, one of Baird's first objectives after returning from the Rose Bowl was to negotiate a match with Wisconsin. Baird sought to maximize the revenue from the contest between the two unbeaten teams by proposing that the game be played in a large stadium. Baird traveled to Milwaukee in February 1902, where he was assured that the city's baseball park had seating for 6,000 people and that 4,000 temporary seats could be erected for the game. Baird noted that "a game played in Milwaukee would tend to bring out the full strength of Milwaukee and surrounding territory." However, Baird was not satisfied and arranged for the game to be played in Chicago. The match between Michigan and Wisconsin drew a record 20,000 spectators; Michigan won the game 6–0. The 1902 team compiled the school's second consecutive undefeated season and National Championship and outscored opponents 644–12.

=== 1903–1904 seasons ===
Michigan's undefeated streak continued through the 1903 and 1904 seasons (with one tie against Minnesota in 1903). Over the course of Yost's first four seasons at Michigan, the team was 44–0–1, outscoring opponents 2,331–40.

== Acclaim for Baird's role as athletic director ==
=== Media coverage of Baird's role in Michigan's success ===
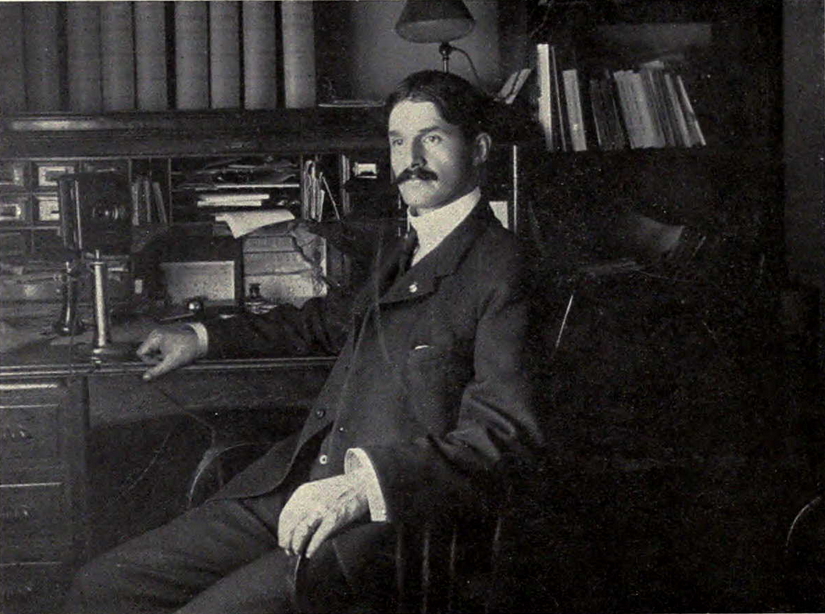
Baird at his desk in Ann Arbor, c. 1903

Michigan was the most successful football team in the country, and while Yost received the lion's share of the credit, much praise was also paid to Baird for his role in building Michigan's athletic programs. Baird has been called the "financial genius" of the Yost era football teams. In March 1903, an eastern newspaper wrote about the success Baird had achieved in his five years in control of athletics at Michigan:

In that time the Michigan athletics treasury has acquired a large cash balance and the teams have been universally successful. For the past two years Michigan's teams have won the western championship in every branch of sport except baseball, and in a financial way the Baird administration has been phenomenally successful.

In October 1903, another eastern newspaper ran a lengthy article profiling "Michigan's 'Big Three,' Yost, Baird, Fitzpatrick." The writer noted Baird's foresight in developing the program:

He constantly plans for coming years and to his foresight is due the present healthy condition of athletics in the university.... He is considered without peer as a manager of college athletics.

In December 1903, newspapers reported that Michigan "pays the three men who are responsible for her supremacy in athletics $10,250 a year" — $3,750 for Yost, $3,500 for Baird, and $3,000 for trainer, Keene Fitzpatrick. One paper observed that their compensation was "over double that of United States Senators," though each was "conceded to be worth all he gets." Baird was praised as a "clever diplomat" who arranged all the schedules and "looks after the business end." Baird reported at the time that, after all expenses, the football program would have a balance of $20,000 – $25,000 which would be used to support other sports that were not as well patronized as football. The Los Angeles Times wrote the following about Baird's role at Michigan:

But no amount of physical ability will get the money without a good business head to overlook the plebeian affairs at the gate. Member No. 3 of the Michigan Athletic Triumvirate is found in the person of Charles Baird, graduate student manager, an accredited college diplomat, arranger of schedules and collarer of collegiate finances. He, too, is a masterpiece in his line, witness the ability of the Ann Arbor college to pay such amounts for its athletic supremacy. When any of the eastern universities were founded the idea that eventually there would be practically a 'chair of football,' a 'chair of athletics' and a 'student business manager' would have been greeted with hearty guffaws … But 'de world do move,' and the broader idea is that physical culture and mental culture are a worthy pair, and should go hand in hand.

=== Track and Olympic championships ===
Michigan's success was not limited to football during the Baird era. Baird asked trainer Keene Fitzpatrick to serve as track coach in addition to his responsibilities as trainer for the football team. Michigan's track teams under Fitzpatrick from 1901 to 1910 compiled a 24–2–1 record in dual meets and won Western Conference track championships in 1900, 1901, 1902, 1903, 1904, and 1906.

Michigan's athletes also excelled in Olympic competition during the Baird years. Over the course of four Olympic Games held during Baird's tenure as athletic director, Michigan athletes won 16 medals, including 7 gold medals. In 1900, funds were solicited from faculty, students, alumni and Ann Arbor businessmen to send four Michigan track athletes to the Olympics in Paris. The Michigan athletes won three silver medals in Paris—John McLean in the high hurdles, Charles Dvorak in the pole vault, and Howard Hayes in the 800 meter race.

One of the highlights for Michigan athletics during the Baird era came at the 1904 Summer Olympics in St. Louis, Missouri, which have sometimes been referred to as the "Michigan Olympics." Six University of Michigan athletes won 10 medals: six gold, two silver, and two bronze. The Michigan medal winners at the 1904 Olympics were:

- Archie Hahn – gold medals in the 60 meters, 100 meters, and 200 meters;
- Ralph Rose – gold medal in the shot put, silver medal in the discus, and bronze medal in the hammer throw;
- Charles Dvorak – gold medal in the pole vault;
- Fred Schule – gold medal in the 110-meter hurdles;
- Wesley Coe – silver medal in the shot put; and
- Jam Handy – bronze medal in the 440-yard breaststroke.

At the 1906 Summer Olympics in Athens, Archie Hahn repeated as the 100-meter champion, winning his fourth gold medal. And at the 1908 Summer Olympics in London, Michigan athlete Ralph Rose repeated as the gold medalist in the shot put, and John Garrels won a silver medal in the 110-meter hurdles and a bronze in the shot put.

=== Development of Ferry Field ===
Michigan's football team became a major attraction after the success of Coach Yost, and Regent Field with its 800-seat grandstand could not accommodate the paying crowds that sought to watch the team play. Baird improved the university's athletic fields and "was responsible for the construction of Ferry Field to replace the outdated Regents Field." When Baird resigned as athletic director, one newspaper wrote: "Baird's greatest work for Michigan was planning and building Ferry field, which is the largest college athletic ground in the United States."

In 1902, Detroit businessman Dexter M. Ferry purchased and donated 20 acres (81,000 m^{2}) north of Regent Field for use in constructing a new athletic facility. Baird began by constructing new bleacher seating for 6,000 adjacent to the existing grandstand. One thousand circus seats were also installed. In November 1902, a Thanksgiving Day game against the University of Minnesota was held at Ferry Field with 10,000 spectators in attendance.

By 1906, the new Ferry Field with seating for 18,000 spectators was opened. The facility included a brick wall and ornamental gate with ten ticket windows. The gateway was designed by Albert Kahn Architects of Detroit and constructed at a cost of over $10,000. In the 1890s, a $3.00 membership granted students admission to all athletic events. By 1904, a general admission ticket for a big game cost as much as $3.00. With a seating capacity of 18,000, Baird's athletic department could generate $50,000 in revenue from a single game. When Ferry Field was completed, Baird expressed his pride in the facility:

Speaking of the field, Michigan today has the finest athletic grounds in the United States. With the completion of the operations we are making the total expenditure for permanent improvement of the field will cost $150,000. On it we have a gridiron for practice, another where the old field was, and the splendid new one, drained, leveled, sodded, surrounded by a concrete wall.

=== Boston Red Sox seek to hire Baird from Michigan ===
In January 1903, Baird was reappointed by the university's Board of Regents for a term of three years. Baird's phenomenal success drew interest from professional sports. In March 1903, Boston Red Sox owner Henry Killilea offered Baird a contract as the baseball team's business manager and financial secretary, replacing Joseph Gavin. Press accounts indicated, though Baird was loath to quit Michigan, the "financial inducements offered by Mr. Killilea were so far in excess of Baird's present salary at the University of Michigan that there is hardly any doubt but that he will accept, although alumni are working tooth and nail to keep him at Michigan." When it was announced that Baird had signed a contract with the Boston team, the student body at Michigan signed petitions seeking to retain Baird as athletic director. On receiving the petitions from the Michigan student body, Red Sox owner Killilea, who was a Michigan alumnus, agreed to release Baird from the contract.

== Later years at Michigan: 1905–1909 ==
=== 1905 season: Allegations of professionalism ===
The 1905 season began with Michigan on top of the football world, having completed four consecutive undefeated seasons. In early 1905, Baird wrote an article for the Illustrated Sporting News commenting on the differences between low-scoring Eastern football and high-scoring Western football. Baird commented on differences in coaching and on the Western teams' focus on speed and continuous development of multiple formations, alternating line plays with end runs, introducing the element of uncertainty and inspiring the spectator.

Michigan continued its "point-a-minute" offense, outscored opponents 495–2, and finished the season 12–1.

However, the 1905 season also found Baird and Yost mired in scandal. In the week before the Western Conference championship game against Chicago, Stanford University President David Starr Jordan, wrote a feature article in Collier's making allegations of "professionalism" at Michigan. Yost was described as the "czar of Michigan's system" and Baird as the "business man of Michigan athletics and silent partner in the firm of Yost & Baird, victory-makers." Jordan accused Yost of traveling across the country "soliciting expert players" who were not true student athletes. Baird was also accused of traveling much and "practically proselyting for athletes." While some accounts noted that Jordan "does not come forward with any direct evidence against the Michigan athletes," the story was printed in newspapers across the country. Even President Theodore Roosevelt spoke at the time calling for a "gentleman's agreement" among American colleges and universities providing for the removal of any player who engaged in brutality or foul play and of the player who is not a bona fide student and amateur.

Baird responded to Jordan's allegations by calling them "the merest bosh" and by denying there were any inducements or special favors for athletes. He later noted: "President Jordan has made these charges several times, and never brought forth one iota of proof to establish his claim." Former Michigan player and then Drake coach, Willie Heston, one of the players named as a professional in Jordan's article, responded: "I was in a position to know what was going on and I believe that I am safe in saying that no Michigan athlete ever did anything since Baird took hold of things there."

One week after Jordan's article was published, Michigan's four-year unbeaten streak ended in the last game of the season, a 2–0 loss to rival Chicago.

=== 1906 season and withdrawal from the Western Conference ===
Lingering concerns about professionalism and the integrity of amateur athletics led Michigan's president, James Burrill Angell, to call for a special conference of Western Conference faculty in January 1906. The committee condemned the "money end" of football and resolved that university faculty should have charge of gate receipts. The Angell Committee also voted in March 1906 to prohibit summer training, to eliminate professional coaches and the "training table," and to limit the admission price to college athletic events to a maximum of fifty cents.

One of the most drastic reforms enacted in 1906 restricted conference schools to five football games per year. Accordingly, and despite playing 13 regular season games in 1905, Michigan was permitted to play only five games in 1906. Michigan finished 4–1 in 1905, losing the final game of the season to the University of Pennsylvania. The Pennsylvania game was negotiated by Baird and played in Philadelphia before 26,000 spectators—setting a new record for the highest attendance at a Michigan football game.

Dissatisfied with Michigan's treatment by the Western Conference, Baird wrote to the Intercollegiate Athletic Association in December 1906 asking Michigan's admission to the eastern conference for the next athletic season.

In January 1907, a "close friend" of Baird told the press that Baird found the Western Conference's new restrictions to be unacceptable and warned that Baird would resign unless the conference loosened up on the rules. Nevertheless, a proposal to extend the football schedule to seven games and to eliminate the harsh effects of applying the three-year rule retroactively was rejected. One of the most troubling rules going into effect in 1907 limited eligibility to three years. The rule was applied retroactively so that many of the conference's best players, including Michigan's captain Germany Schulz, would be ineligible to play as seniors even though they had played as freshman when such play was within the rules. Six of the university's eight regents favored withdrawal, and Regent Arthur Hill noted, "We have to beat Pennsylvania, and we cannot do it under conference rules."

In April 1907, Michigan announced that it would not comply with the new restrictions, and all athletic competition between Michigan and other Western Conference schools was severed. The Washington Post noted that the new Western Conference rules had made it difficult for western schools to compete in the east and criticized the conference for its "mistake" in "virtually driving Michigan out of the conference."

=== 1907 season ===
Because the decision not to comply with conference rules was not made until the summer of 1907, Baird was not able to sign contracts for a full schedule of football games. In February 1907, he announced that he had signed contracts with two football powers from regions outside the Midwest—Penn from the east and Vanderbilt from the south. However, the uncertainty over Western Conference rules forced Baird in May 1907 to turn down games with Dartmouth and the Naval Academy. The Vanderbilt games marked the first time Michigan played a football game south of the Mason–Dixon line. But the year's premiere matchup was the rematch with Penn to be played in Ann Arbor. Baird predicted that the Western Conference matchup between Minnesota and Chicago "will not hold a candle" to the Penn-Michigan game. Baird continued in his comments about the Penn game:

I think it will eclipse in point of interest and attendance any football game ever played in the Middle West. If we do not draw close to 28,000 spectators, it will be because something has gone wrong.

The 1907 season saw Michigan go 5–0 in its first five games, outscoring opponents 107–0. However, Michigan lost the final game of the season to Penn, 6–0, before a crowd of 19,000 at Ferry Field.

=== 1908 season ===
During the winter and spring of 1908, the controversy over withdrawal from the Western Conference continued. In November 1907, rumors were prevalent that Baird and Fitzpatrick intended to resign unless Michigan withdrew from the conference. In April 1908, the school's Board in Control of College Athletics voted in favor of withdrawal, and Michigan ceased being a member of the conference for the next nine years.

With the mandatory reduction in both ticket prices and the number of games in 1906 and 1907, Baird's ability to generate a profit for the athletic department had been impaired. In September 1908, Baird announced that the department would be in debt $6,000 at the beginning of the football season—the same as 1907. Baird noted: "This was caused by a poor baseball season and the usual expenditures on the grounds. No, we will not erect any more seats. We now have a seating capacity of 20,000 persons and that will be sufficient."

Unrestrained by Western Conference rules, Baird arranged an eight-game football schedule for 1908 that included games against eastern powers Penn and Syracuse, two southern schools in Kentucky and Vanderbilt, and three budding Midwest independents, Ohio State, Notre Dame and Michigan State.

Seeking to re-focus attention on Michigan as a national power, Baird wrote a column about the team's prospects for 1908 to be published in newspapers across the country. Baird noted that the forward pass was a "radical change." Baird was positive about the forward pass, stating that it "opens a field for development of skill and science along lines that have been uncultivated" and making the game "more spectacular than ever." Baird wrote that "the big game of the year" would be the Michigan-Penn game—marking only the second visit to the west of the teams of any of the larger eastern universities since 1896. Baird expected "a fierce and hard" game and noted that Michigan had erected bleachers seating over 20,000 people, with arrangements for 7,000 to 8,000 more in standing room accommodations. Baird also predicted that Ohio State, then operating under former Michigan star, Albert Herrnstein, would prove to be a "strong and excellent team."

The 1908 season proved a disappointment as the football team closed with consecutive losses to Penn (29–0) and Syracuse (28–4) and a record of 5–2–1.

=== Baird's resignation ===
In December 1908, Baird announced his intention to resign as Michigan's athletic director. Newspaper accounts of his resignation focused on two factors. First, Baird's father-in-law had died earlier in the year, leaving a million-dollar fortune to his wife. Second, Baird was reported to have an interest in using his family's new wealth to purchase a professional baseball franchise. The following account is typical of the press coverage at the time:

It has become known here that Charles Baird, long the leading figure in athletics at the University of Michigan, has sent his resignation to the faculty.... The popular leader will have no fear of the wolf for many a day to come. At present he can be regarded as the richest man connected with the university; that is, by figuring on the wealth of his wife, Mrs. Baird, it has turned out, is the only heir to her father's estate in Kansas City. Mrs. Baird's father died some time ago and left a fortune well over the $1,000,000 mark. Consequently, Baird himself is anxious to make his home in Kansas City. Baird also has a 'bug' about becoming a baseball magnate. He, of course, loves athletics and is anxious to become an owner. Rumours have him with the Kansas City American association club … The loss of Baird to the University of Michigan would be a severe blow to athletics. The fact that Baird will leave probably is the cause of Coach Yost's hesitation about remaining after next year. The two have worked like a team ever since Yost came here.

Before leaving the school, Baird traveled to Madison, Wisconsin to engage in a final round of diplomacy seeking to restore athletic relations between Michigan and Wisconsin. Baird announced in March 1909 that his resignation would become final at the end of the then-present college term.

== Banker and businessman in Kansas City ==
In June 1902, Baird married Georgia O. Robertson at the Washington Hotel in Kansas City, Missouri. Baird and his wife first became acquainted while both were students at the University of Michigan. His wife was the daughter of John Duffy Robertson, "a leading business man and capitalist of Kansas City." Baird's father-in-law, the president of Kansas City's Interstate National Bank, fell ill with diabetes and carbuncles on the back of his neck, and died in January 1908.

Baird moved to Kansas City, Missouri in 1909, where he lived for the remainder of his life. In 1912, Baird paid $49,000 for one of the finest homes in Kansas City, a 3-acre (12,000 m^{2}) estate "with forest trees" on Sunset Drive overlooking the Country Club. In March 1914, Baird, who was then engaged in the investment and farm mortgage business, purchased the Western Exchange Bank in Kansas City and was elected its president. At various times, Baird was also a director of the Inter-State National Bank, a director of the Morris Plan Company, and treasurer of the Anchor Savings and Loan Association, all of Kansas City.

In 1911, he was in negotiations to purchase the Boston National League baseball team, but opted not to do so. An article reporting on his interest in the Boston Rustlers baseball club noted:

Baird is a capitalist of Kansas City. For a number of years he was director of athletics at the University of Michigan and established a reputation in the business end of the game that is second to none. The Kansas City man has always taken a keen and intelligent interest in professional baseball, and has been anxious to obtain a controlling interest in some major league club.

Baird did own an interest in the Kansas City Packers of the Federal League in 1915.

Baird also served on the Board of Visitors of the University of Missouri from 1921 until at least 1937, also acting as the President of the Board for several years.

== Baird Carillon ==
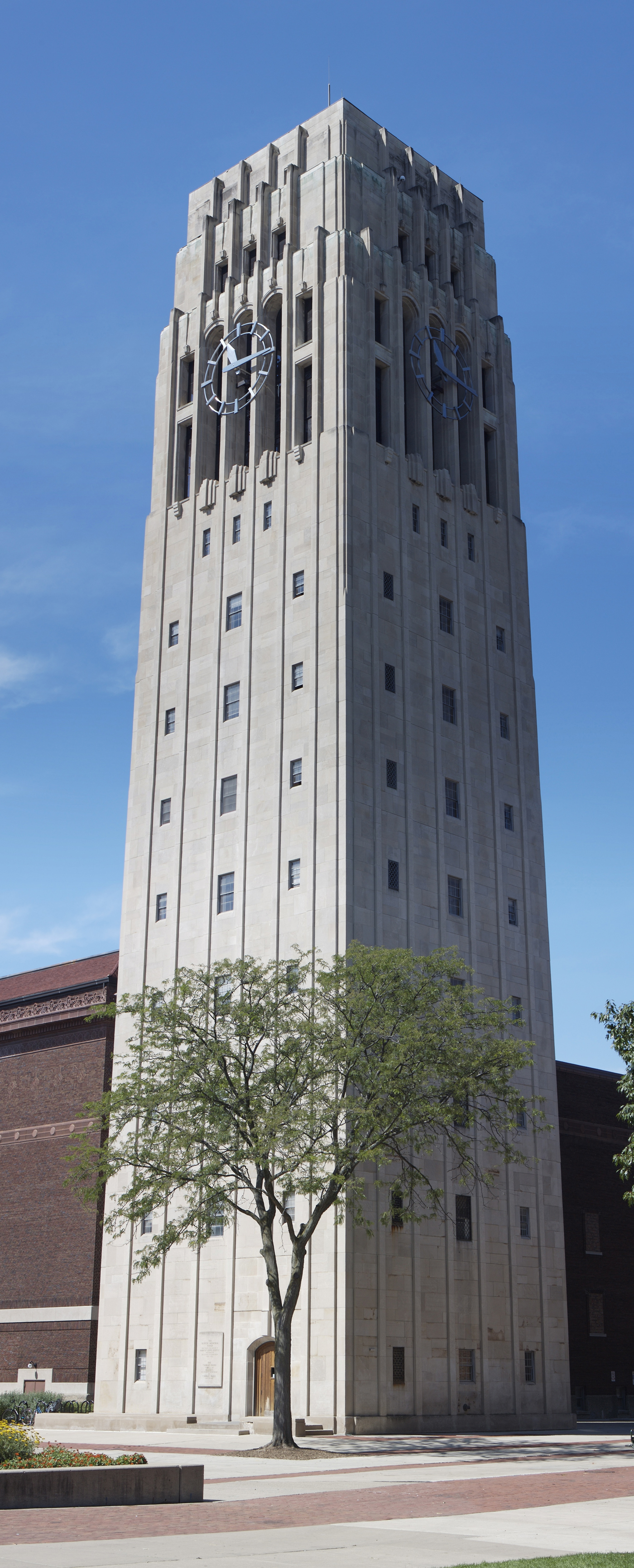
The Charles Baird Carillon is housed in the Burton Memorial Tower.

In his later years, Baird became a benefactor of the University of Michigan. His most prominent gift was the Charles Baird Carillon, a carillon consisting of 53 bells that was the third heaviest in the world in 1936. The carillon was purchased with a $70,000 gift from Baird. When Baird first offered the carillon to the university, the Burton Memorial Tower had not been built. The school initially set aside $35,000 to house the carillon in the tower of the Michigan Union. When the Union was found to be an unsuitable home, the Regents developed a more ambitious plan to construct a bell tower. The plan resulted in the construction of the Burton Tower, which opened in November 1936. The carillon weighs 43 tons and was cast by John Taylor Bellfoundry, in Loughborough, England. It has been housed in the Burton Tower since 1936.

Baird also donated one of the most well-known sculptures on the University of Michigan campus, "Sunday Morning in Deep Waters" by Swedish sculptor, Carl Milles. Baird made the gift of the bronze sculpture in 1940 in memory of Thomas McIntyre Cooley, an early professor and dean of the law school. The sculpture is located on the Ingalls Mall, between the Michigan League and Burton Tower.

== Death ==
Baird died in November 1944 at age 74 following a heart attack in Kansas City. He was buried at the Forest Hill Calvary Cemetery in Kansas City.
