= Shar Music =

Musical instrument retail

- Industry: Musical instrument retail
- Founded: 1962
- Founder: Michael Avsharian Sr.
- Headquarters: Ann Arbor, Michigan, United States
- Key people: Charles Avsharian (CEO)
- Services: Musical instrument retail, repair, restoration, and music education
- Website: www.sharmusic.com

Shar Music is an American retailer and service provider specializing in string instruments, operated by Shar Products Company and headquartered in Ann Arbor, Michigan. Its business focuses on bowed string instruments including violins, violas, cellos, and double basses, as well as bows, strings, instrument cases, sheet music, and related accessories. The company also provides instrument repair and restoration services.

== History ==
Shar was established in 1962 as a mail-order business by Michael Avsharian Sr., an Armenian immigrant living in Ann Arbor, at the age of 57. The idea came from his sons, the violinists Michael Avsharian Jr. and Charles Avsharian, who had observed that string players often waited weeks for strings and accessories. Charles, then a student at the Curtis Institute of Music, had begun importing strings and selling them to fellow musicians at a discount. The company sold strings and accessories for the violin, viola and cello by catalogue.

As the business grew, a string distributor sought to cut off Shar's supply of strings; according to the Ann Arbor Observer, the dispute ended after the family appealed to Michigan's members of Congress and the Attorney General's office intervened.

Michael Avsharian Jr. joined the company in 1964 after leaving a teaching position at North Texas State University, and Charles Avsharian left the faculty of the University of Michigan School of Music to join it in 1970. By 1980 the two brothers ran the company. In 1979 Shar bought a 27,000 square feet (2,500 m^{2}) building on South Industrial Highway in Ann Arbor, the former headquarters of KMS Fusion. By 1980 it had opened a retail outlet there, manufactured items such as mutes, bridges and instrument cases, and had added sheet music to its catalogue, whose mailing list held about 30,000 names.

Members of the Avsharian family remained involved in the company for several decades. Hiag Avsharian, son of Charles, worked with his father and uncle and served as a co-owner and president of Shar Music for approximately 20 years. He left the company in 2015 and sold his ownership interest in 2017.
