= Joseph Conyers =

American double bassist (born 1981)

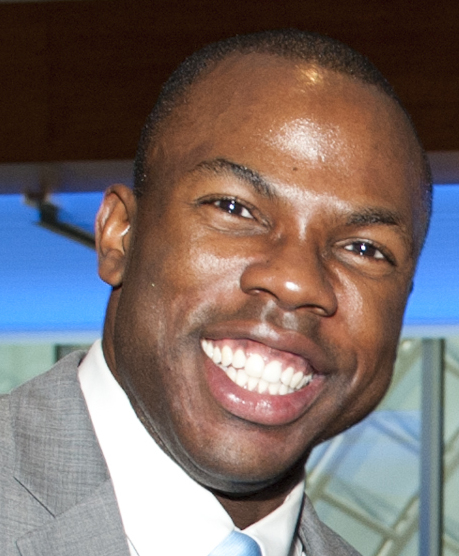
- Conyers in 2014

Background information
- Born: Joseph Hawkins Conyers; 1981 (age 44–45); Savannah, Georgia, U.S.
- Instrument: Double bass
- Member of: Philadelphia Orchestra
- Website: josephconyers.com

Joseph Hawkins Conyers (born 1981) is an American double bassist and music instructor. Since 2023, he has been the principal double bassist of the Philadelphia Orchestra; He is also the co-founder of Project 440, a non-profit organization dedicated to teaching Philadelphia high school musicians entrepreneurship and life skills.

== Early life and career ==
Conyers was born in Savannah, Georgia. He began learning his first instrument, the piano, at age 5. He began learning the double at age 11 after being gifted one by his teacher, Lynne Tobin. He graduated from the Curtis Institute of Music in 2004.

Prior to his appointment with the Philadelphia Orchestra, Conyers was a member of the Grand Rapids Symphony - as principal bassist until 2009 - the Atlanta Symphony Orchestra, and the Santa Fe Opera. He uses an 1802 Italian Double Bass called Norma, which he first acquired while a part of the Grand Rapids Symphony in 2005 and purchased in 2007.

In 2010, Conyers was appointed as the assistant principal of the Philadelphia Orchestra, a position he held for approximately 14 years. In 2023, his promotion to principal bass in the orchestra made him the first Black principal instrumentalist in the orchestra's history. In addition to performing, he has taught at schools such as the Juilliard School, Temple University, and the Boston University Tanglewood Institute.

Conyers has received the awards: The Curtis Institute Young Alumni (2015), Award the C. Hartman Kuhn Award (2018), The Sphinx Organization's Medal of Excellence (2019), and the Theodore L. Kesselman Award (2019). In 2018, he was listed in Musical America's 30 Top Professionals – Innovators, Independent Thinkers, and Entrepreneurs.
