= School of Music, Theatre, and Dance =

Performing arts school at the University of Michigan

Coordinates: 42°17′25.1″N 83°43′15.6″W

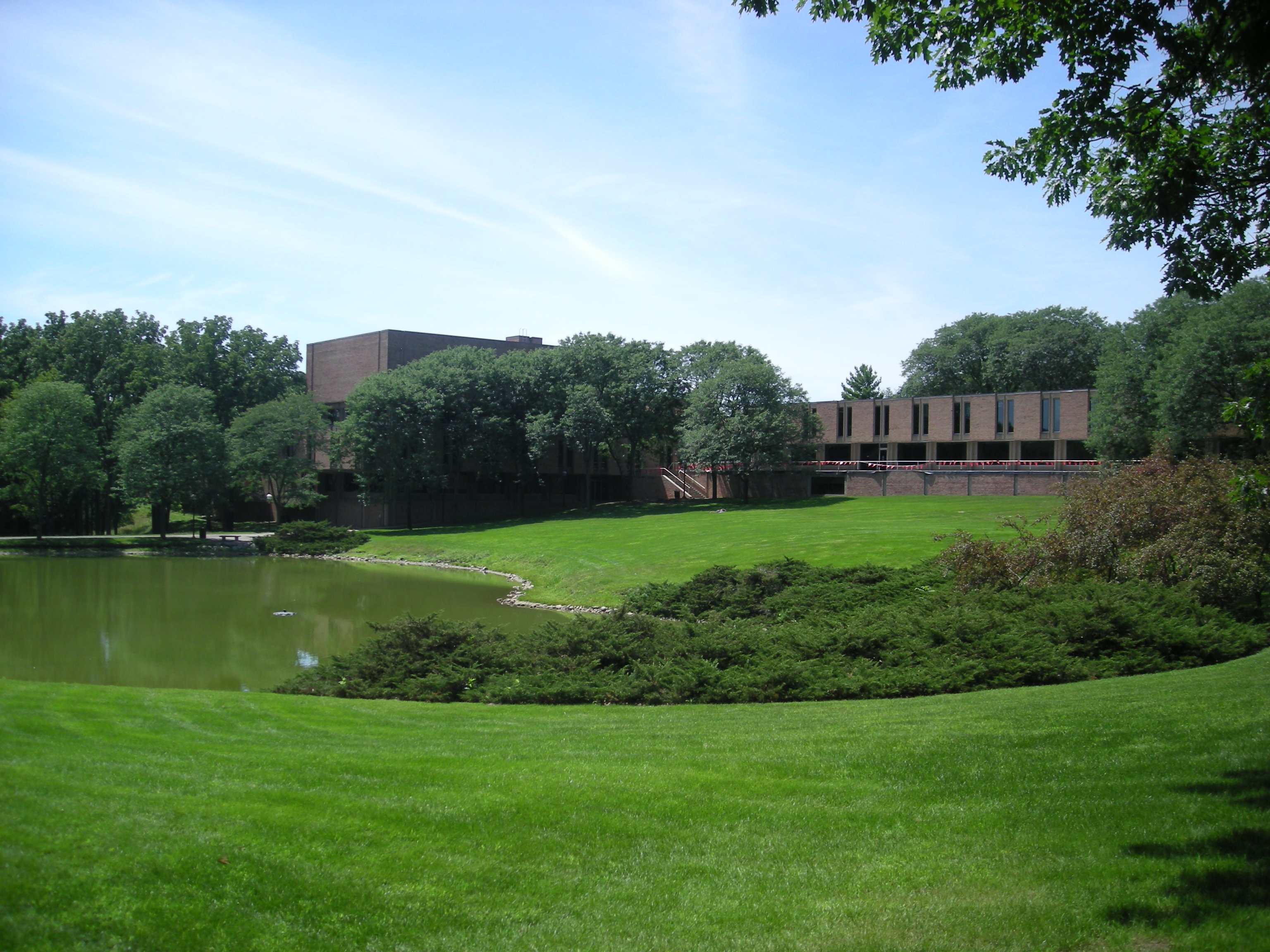
- Earl V. Moore Building
- Type: Public
- Established: 1880; 146 years ago
- Parent institution: University of Michigan
- Dean: David Gier
- Faculty: 155
- Students: 1,105 (2020-2021)
- Undergraduates: 832
- Postgraduates: 273
- Location: Ann Arbor, Michigan, United States
- Campus: Urban
- YouTube: youtube.com/@umichsmtd
- Website: smtd.umich.edu

The School of Music, Theatre, and Dance (SMTD) is the undergraduate and graduate school for the performing arts of the University of Michigan, in Ann Arbor, Michigan, United States.

The school was founded in 1880 as the Ann Arbor School of Music. It was originally independent from the university until 1929.

The School is located on the University of Michigan's North Campus, which is also home to the College of Engineering, the Stamps School of Art and Design, and the Taubman College of Architecture and Urban Planning.

== History ==
The school was founded in 1880 after Henry Simmons Frieze, founder and president of the Choral Union and the University Musical Society, urged leaders to include music among the school's offerings. Administrators and Deans include Charles Sink, Earl V. Moore, James B. Wallace, Allen Britton, Paul Boylan, Karen Wolff (2000–05), Christopher Kendall (2005–15), Aaron Dworkin (2015-18), and David Gier (2018–present). Known then as the Ann Arbor School of Music, the school was originally independent from the university. It was later formally incorporated into the University of Michigan in 1929, with Earl V. Moore as its director.

=== Notable alumni ===
Well known alumni include playwright Arthur Miller, actors James Earl Jones, Gavin Creel, Joe Serafini, Darren Criss, Jo Ellen Pellman, David Alan Grier and Lucy Liu, musicians Jessye Norman, Yakov Kreizberg, Ashley Putnam, William Albright, George Crumb, Alexander Frey, Normand Lockwood, Cynthia Phelps, Colin Stetson, David Daniels, Chip Davis, and Michael Fabiano, as well as the pop star Madonna.

See also the list of University of Michigan arts alumni.

== Performance training areas ==
The university puts on more than a dozen main stage productions and concerts every year. Besides its main stage productions, the school also offers performance opportunities through studio productions and student-run groups.

=== Main stage and studio productions ===
Main stage and studio productions staged by the university every year include:

- Three main stage musicals and a musical theatre studio show (often a play)
- Two main stage operas as well as opera scenes, and two studio productions
- Four or five main stage plays
- Multiple dance productions

=== Ensembles ===
Musicians have the opportunity to perform in many ensembles in connection with the university. These include choral ensembles, orchestras, wind bands, historical music ensembles, jazz ensembles, electronic and new music ensembles, chamber music groups, and world music ensembles.

==== Gamelans ====
The school is home to one of the longest-established Javanese gamelan ensembles in the United States. This group of instruments, known formally as Kyai Telaga Madu (Venerable Lake of Honey), has been at the university since 1966, when its purchase was negotiated and organized by Bill Malm. From 1968 until 2002, the ensemble was under the direction of faculty ethnomusicologist Judith Becker. The ensemble is currently directed by Gavin Ryan.

==== Bands ====
Wind ensembles, under the University Bands, provide a central performance and training opportunity for students at the school. The wind ensembles provide a primary training opportunity for most instrumentalists at the school, who may audition to perform in one of the two top ensembles, the Symphony Band and Concert Band. The Michigan Marching Band is also a component of the University Bands and provides music and entertainment at university athletic events. Students attending all U-M campuses (Ann Arbor, Dearborn, and Flint), with any major, are welcome to audition for any of the Athletic Bands.

==== Orchestras ====
Students also receive training in large orchestral ensembles. Ensemble opportunities for students include the University Symphony Orchestra, the University Philharmonia Orchestra, the Contemporary Directions Ensemble, and pit orchestra for opera productions. In addition, two Campus Orchestras are composed of non-music major students, faculty members, staff, and alumni of the University of Michigan.

=== Student organizations ===
Student organizations through the university include:

- Arts Enterprise which invites students to create projects and make connections to the local, national, and international cultural spheres.
- Basement Arts which allows students the opportunity to direct, produce and star in studio productions. This student group is well known for performing student written works such as A Very Potter Musical.
- MUSKET, founded in 1908, puts on two large scale productions of musicals every year run entirely by students. Recent Productions have included: Rent, How to Succeed in Business Without Really Trying and Into the Woods.
- The University of Michigan Gilbert and Sullivan Society, which produces main stage productions of operettas every year. Most of these are works by Gilbert and Sullivan, however they have also ventured into other works.

== Facilities ==
The school's facilities are located in Ann Arbor, Michigan. On the University of Michigan north campus, these include the Earl V. Moore Building, the Stearns Building, the Walgreen Drama Center, the Dance Building and the Lurie Carillon. Specific north campus facilities include studios in the James and Anne Duderstadt Center, as well as the Arthur Miller Theater and the Stamps Auditorium (both in the Walgreen Drama Center). The Miller Theater is the only theater given permission by the estate of Arthur Miller to bear the playwright's name. On central campus, the school's facilities include Hill Auditorium, the Power Center and Burton Memorial Tower, which houses the Charles Baird Carillon. The university's south campus is home to William D. Revelli Hall, which houses offices and rehearsal space for the University of Michigan Marching Band.

=== History of the Moore Building ===
The majority of the school's teaching spaces, faculty offices, and music library, are located in the Earl V. Moore School of Music Building. This building is named after a previous dean of the school, and was designed in a mid-century modern style by architect Eero Saarinen. Saarinen was commissioned to design the master plan for the University of Michigan's North Campus, he requested to design the music school building (now the Earl V. Moore Building).

The original scheme called for an L-shaped building and a circular concert hall. Completed in 1964, the result was a five-level pavilion with flanking wings. Saarinen envisioned a building in harmony with nature, and so designed the building to be built into a hill overlooking a pond. The brick-clad concrete structure has narrow vertical windows that contrast with the horizontal brick patterns, thought to represent the alternating colors of piano keys. The brick color is known as "Cranbrook Buff" for its reference to the color of the buildings on the campus of the Cranbrook Education Community. The style of this building has influenced almost all of the later construction on North Campus.

The original building contained 2 rehearsal/concert halls, 45 performance teaching studios, 18 classrooms, 40 offices, a large library, 120 practice rooms, including 12 organ practice rooms, and other special facilities for piano, harp, harpsichord and percussion practice. The construction of this building allowed for the first increase in enrollment since 1946.

During construction of the building, Saarinen was diagnosed with a brain tumor, but he was able to watch the progress of the building from his room at University Hospital.

According to the financial report submitted by President Harlan Hatcher to the Board of Regents in 1966, the University of Michigan had the second academic music school in the United States, after the University of Indiana School of Music. The Ann Arbor campus and the University Division of the National Music Camp at Interlochen enrolled the largest summer music session in the U.S.

=== Renovation ===
On October 30, 2012, University of Michigan President Mary Sue Coleman announced an $8-million gift from William K. Brehm and Delores S. Brehm, a major contribution toward the cost of renovating and expanding the Moore Building. Of the total cost, another $14 million is allocated from the university, with the remaining balance to come from additional fundraising, including a gift from Glenn E. Watkins, emeritus professor of musicology. Construction for the project commenced in early 2014 and was finished in the fall of 2015. The renovation, which cost $29.5 million and added 34,000 square feet, includes a rehearsal with the footprint of Hill Auditorium, revamping of the McIntosh Theater, a lecture hall, an entrance and lobby, and new practice and teaching rooms.

== Departments and degree programs ==
The School of Music, Theatre & Dance offers degrees from the bachelors to the doctoral level. Seventeen academic departments make up the School of Music, Theatre & Dance, each offering several degree programs. They include:

- Department of Chamber Music—MM and Specialist in chamber music.
- Department of Composition—BM, MM, MA, PhD and DMA in composition.
- Department of Conducting—MM and DMA in Conducting (Band/Wind Ensemble, Orchestral and Choral programs).
- Department of Dance—BFA and MFA in Dance. Minor in Dance.
- Department of Entrepreneurship & Leadership—Certificate in Arts Entrepreneurship & Leadership; Minor in Performing Arts Management & Entrepreneurship.
- Department of Jazz & Contemporary Improvisation—BFA in Jazz & Contemplative Studies; BM and DMA in Jazz & Contemporary Improvisation; MM in Improvisation
- Department of Music Education—BM in Choral or Instrumental Music Education, MM (regular term or summer options) and PhD in Music Education.
- Department of Music Theory—BM and PhD in Music Theory. PhD in Composition & Music Theory. Certificate in Music Theory Pedagogy. Minor in Music, Minor in Popular Music Studies.
- Department of Musical Theatre—BFA in Musical Theatre. Minor in Musical Theatre Composition.
- Department of Musicology—BM and Certificate programs in Musicology; PhD in Historical Musicology; PhD in Ethnomusicology.
- Department of Organ—BM in Organ Performance & Sacred Music; BMA in Organ Performance; BMA in Multidisciplinary Studies (Organ); MM in Sacred Music, MM Carillon Performance, MM in Early Keyboard Instruments, MM Harpsichord Performance, MM Organ Performance, DMA Organ Performance, and DMA in Sacred Music.
- Department of Performing Arts Technology—BM in Music and Technology; BFA in Performing Arts Technology; BS in Sound Engineering; MA in Media Arts; and PhD in Performing Arts Technology.
- Department of Piano—BM in Piano Performance; BMA in Piano Performance; BMA in Multidisciplinary Studies (Piano); MM in Chamber Music (Piano); MM in Collaborative Piano; MM in Early Keyboard Instruments; MM in Fortepiano Performance; MM in Piano Performance; MM in Piano Pedagogy & Performance; Specialist in Collaborative Piano; Specialist in Piano Performance; DMA in Piano Performance; DMA in Collaborative Piano; and DMA in Piano Pedagogy & Performance.
- Department of Strings—Harp, Violin, Viola, Cello, Double Bass: BM or BMA in Performance; BMA in Multidisciplinary Studies (Strings); MM in Performance; MM in Chamber Music; Specialist in Performance; DMA in Performance.
- Department of Theatre & Drama—BFA in Theatre Performance (Acting, Directing); BFA in Theatre Design and Production; BFA in Interarts Performance; BTA in Theatre. Minor in Playwriting. Minor in Theatre Design & Production.
- Department of Voice & Opera—BM, BMA, MM, Specialist and DMA in Performance. BMA in Multidisciplinary Studies (Voice).
- Department of Winds & Percussion—BM in Performance (Multiple Wind Instruments or Winds & Percussion); BMA in Winds & Percussion; BMA in Multidisciplinary Studies (Winds & Percussion); MM in Performance; MM in Chamber Music; MM in Wind Instruments; Specialist in Performance; and DMA in Performance.

== Notable projects ==
Michigan Performance Outreach Workshop

- In 2011, musical theatre students Ashley Park and Laura Reed founded the Michigan Performance Outreach Workshop, or MPOW. The group coordinates a one-day event every semester which brings in 5th grade students from Southeast Michigan for a day of arts performances and lessons. All of the activities and performances are given and led by U of M students from a variety of disciplines, including singers, dancers, musicians and actors. The event is provided free of charge and includes lunch for students, and is dedicated to providing youth who have limited creative outlets with exposure to as many aspects of the performing arts as possible. The group also performs in other community service settings such as at C.S. Mott Children's Hospital in 2023.

The Gershwin Initiative

- In 2013, the School entered into a partnership with the Gershwin family to undertake a two-part initiative that will bring the music of George and Ira Gershwin to students, scholars, performers and audiences across campus and worldwide through new critical editions of all the Gershwin brothers' works. In 2013, it was announced that An American in Paris (edited by Mark Clague) and Rhapsody in Blue (jazz band version) were planned to be the first editions published. As of 2023, the initiative's website lists ten planned series.

University of Michigan Javanese Gamelan

- Since the 1960s, the school has been home to one of the longest-established Javanese gamelan ensembles in the United States. This group of instruments, known formally as Kyai Telaga Madu (Venerable Lake of Honey), has been at the university since 1966, when its purchase was negotiated and organized by Bill Malm. From 1968 until 2002, the ensemble was under the direction of faculty ethnomusicologist Judith Becker. The ensemble has actively given performances in Ann Arbor since 1967, and has benefitted from many guest artist instructors from Java who have been in residence at the university to teach Indonesian performance styles such as wayang. The gamelan is housed in a special room built at the school with support from a bequest from Rosannah Steinhoff, who with her husband Bill, was a loyal member of the gamelan in the 1980s, and it is supported with a special endowment fund at the university. The gamelan instruments are part of the Stearns Collection of Music Instruments.

EXCEL Program

- Founded in 2015, the career program at the School of Music, Theatre & Dance, EXCEL (Excellence in Entrepreneurship, Career Empowerment, and Leadership), provides individual career coaching, workshops, and more than $100,000 in annual funding for student projects, including new venture incubation (the EXCELerator) and an annual $10,000 EXCELprize.

Center for World Performance Studies

- Established in 2000, the Center for World Performance Studies (CWPS) originated in the University of Michigan International Institute before shifting to the College of Literature, Science & the Arts in 2015 as part of the U-M Residential College, and in 2024 became a part of the School of Music, Theatre & Dance.

== Research ==
- American Music Institute
- U-M Amerigrove Project
- Gershwin Initiative
- EXCEL
- MPOW
- Center for World Performance Studies
