= Harlem Quartet =

Harlem Quartet is a string quartet that was originally composed of first-place laureates of the Sphinx Competition for Black and Latino string players. They were formed in 2006. The members are first violinist Ilmar Gavilán, second violinist Melissa White, violist Jaime Amador, and cellist Felix Umansky. The Quartet won Best Instrumental Composition at the 2013 Grammy Awards for Mozart Goes Dancing.

== Career ==
=== 2006–2008: Career Beginnings and Take the "A" Train ===
The Harlem Quartet debuted at Carnegie Hall in the fall of 2006 at the Sphinx Organization's 10th anniversary gala concert, and played there again in late January 2007 as participants in Arts Presenters' prestigious and highly competitive Young Performers Career Advancement (YPCA) program as well as in October 2008 with the Cleveland Quartet's cellist Paul Katz at the annual Sphinx gala. They have returned to Carnegie on numerous other occasions. In 2006 it made its debut at Harlem's legendary Apollo Theatre with a well-received performance of Wynton Marsalis's At the Octoroon Balls. In collaboration with cellist Carter Brey, it performed in December 2008 at the Library of Congress in a concert including Schubert's Cello Quintet which employed the Library's matched collection of Stradivari instruments. The Harlem Quartet has been featured on WNBC, CNN, the Today Show, WQXR-FM, and the Art Beat section of the NewsHour with Jim Lehrer website. In 2007 White Pine Music issued the quartet's first CD, Take the "A" Train, a release that was featured in the November issue of Strings magazine that year.

=== 2009−2011: Paul Chihara: "Love Music" and greater success ===
The quartet opened its 2009−10 season returning as featured soloists on the national Sphinx Chamber Orchestra Tour, making thirteen stops coast-to-coast including Carnegie Hall, Eastman School of Music, Oberlin College, and Cerritos Center for the Performing Arts. In December it played two performances at the White House for guests of President Obama and First Lady Michelle Obama, and made an appearance Christmas morning on NBC's Today Show. In 2009 the quartet also performed by invitation with Itzhak Perlman at the Metropolitan Museum of Art and made its London debut performing at the residence of the US ambassador to the UK. Throughout the season the quartet will collaborate with seasoned artists such as Carter Brey, Yehuda Hanani and Paul Freeman and the Chicago Sinfonietta, performing Mozart's "Sinfonia Concertante", Brahms's "Double Concerto", and Michael Abels's "Delights & Dances" for solo string quartet and orchestra. Its second CD, featuring works of Walter Piston, was released in 2010 by Naxos. On a third recording by the quartet Eternal Evolution they collaborated with pianist Awadagin Pratt to showcase works by Judith Lang Zaimont.

In the summer of 2008, as participants in The Perlman Music Program, the quartet members worked daily with such master musicians as Itzhak Perlman, Donald Weilerstein, Paul Katz, and Roger Tapping. The quartet spent two week at Great Lakes Chamber Music Festival in June 2009, performing and giving master classes, and has been invited to return for the 2010 festival. The Quartet started touring around this time.

=== 2012−present: Delights & Dances success and touring ===
In 2012 the quartet start touring performing in the US and UK. They also are featured on Delights & Dances with Mei-Ann Chen and Chicago Sinfonietta released on 28 May 2013. The Quartet won Best Instrumental Composition at the 2013 Grammy Awards for Mozart Goes Dancing. In 2012, former cellist Paul Wiancko and former violist Juan Miguel Hernandez both left to pursue other careers. In replacing Wiancko, White and Gavilán decided to no longer categorize the quartet by color.

Harlem Quartet along with Chick Corea and Gary Burton, recorded the album titled “Hot House.” The ensemble is set to continue their “Hot House Tour” in Japan in June 2014.

== Discography ==
- Take the 'A' Train (White Pine) (2007)
- Paul Chihara: Love Music (2011)
- Delights & Dances (2013)
- Havana Meets Harlem (2024)

== Awards and nominations ==
Year	Organization	Award	Work	Result	Ref.
2013	Grammy Awards	Best Instrumental Composition	"Mozart Goes Dancing"	Won	
2024	Grammy Awards	Best Classical Compendium	"Passion for Bach and Coltrane"	Won	
