= Jessie Montgomery =

American composer (born 1981)

Jessie Montgomery (born December 8, 1981, New York City) is an American violinist, composer, chamber musician, and music educator. Her compositions focus on the vernacular, improvisation, language, and social justice. She is the 2025 Classical Woman of the Year, awarded by the radio program Performance Today.

== Early life and education ==
Jessie Montgomery, who is of African American heritage, was raised in Manhattan's Lower East Side by playwright and performer Robbie McCauley and composer Ed Montgomery. She began her violin studies at the Third Street Music School Settlement. She holds a bachelor's degree in violin performance from the Juilliard School, and completed a master's degree in Composition for Film and Multimedia at New York University in 2012.

Starting in 1999, Montgomery became involved with the Sphinx Organization, a Detroit-based nonprofit that supports young African American and Latino string players. After receiving multiple Sphinx awards and grants as a young performer and composer, she now serves as composer-in-residence for the Sphinx Virtuosi, the organization's professional touring ensemble.

== Career ==
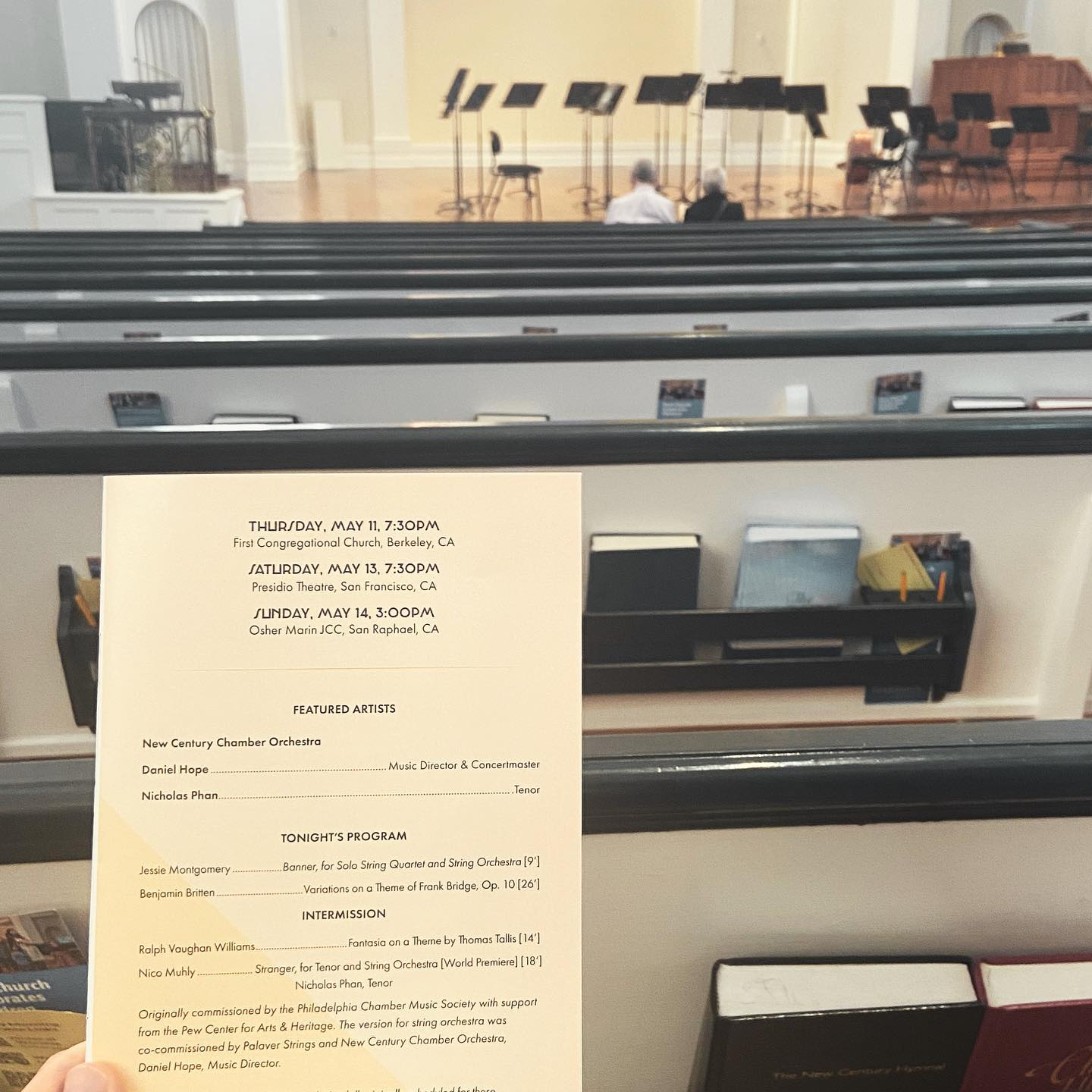
Program and scene at a 2023 concert by the New Century Chamber Orchestra in Berkeley, California, where Montgomery's Banner was played

Montgomery devoted her early career to performance and to teaching at organizations such as Community MusicWorks in Providence, Rhode Island. She co-founded the string ensemble PUBLIQuartet in 2010, and performed with the Catalyst Quartet until January 2021.

She has increasingly focused on composing solo, chamber, vocal, and orchestral works. Montgomery has completed commissions for the Metropolitan Museum of Art, the Orpheus Chamber Orchestra, the Albany Symphony, the Sphinx Organization, the Joyce Foundation, the National Choral Society, and The Guild of Carillonneurs in North America. She has received additional grants and awards from the ASCAP Foundation, Chamber Music America, American Composers Orchestra, and the Sorel Organization. Her music has been performed by the Royal Concertgebouw Orchestra, the Philharmonia Orchestra, Atlanta Symphony, Dallas Symphony, Minnesota Orchestra, and San Francisco Symphony, and choreographed by the Dance Theatre of Harlem.

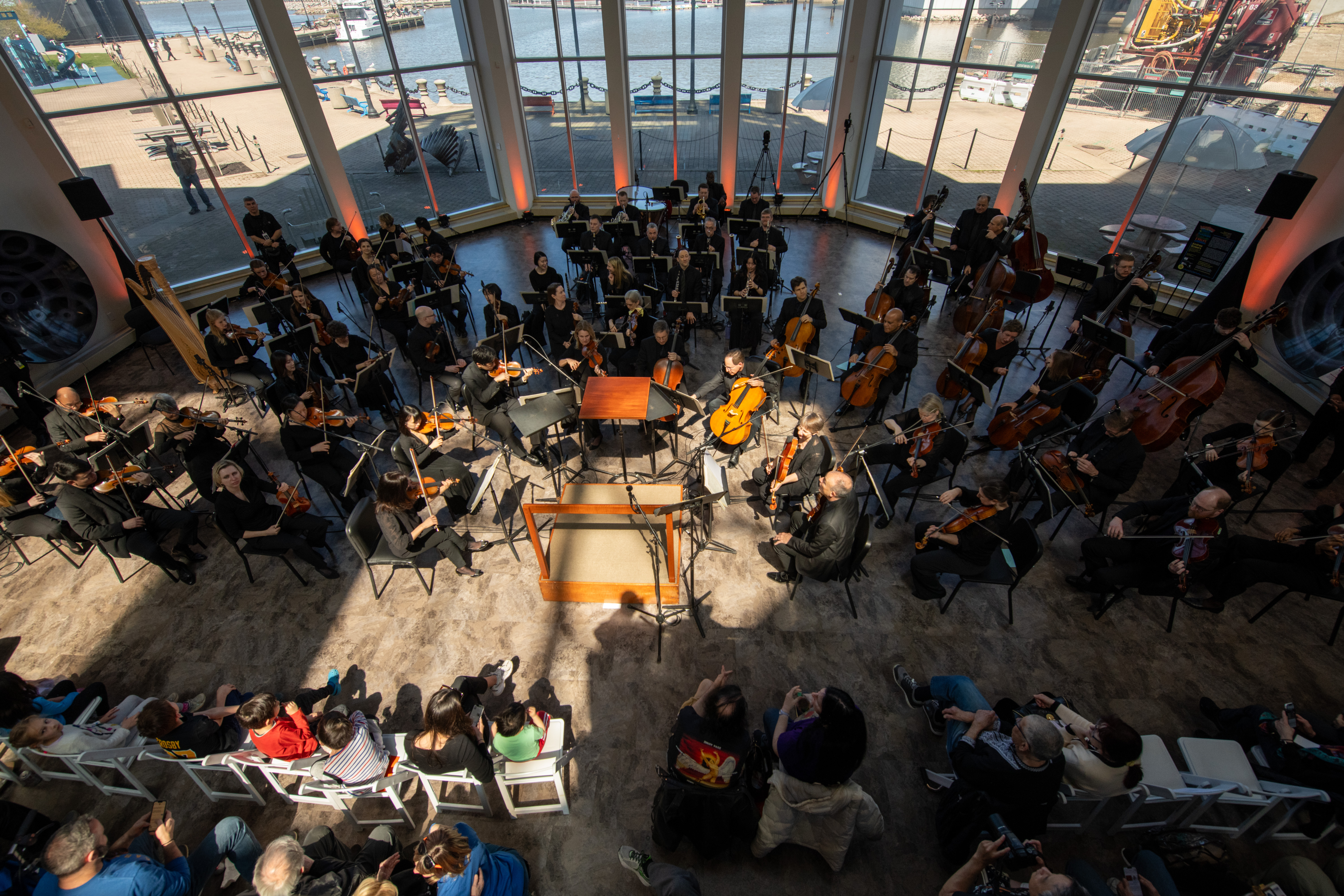
The Cleveland Orchestra performing an "Out of this World" concert program that included Montgomery's Starburst, 2024

In 2014, New York Times music critic Anthony Tommasini highlighted her piece Banner for solo string quartet and string ensemble, commissioned by the Sphinx Organization and the Joyce Foundation as a response to the 200th anniversary of "The Star-Spangled Banner", for "daringly transform[ing] the anthem, folding it into a teeming score that draws upon American folk and protest songs, and anthems from around the world, including Mexican, Puerto Rican and Cuban, to create a musical melting pot".

In 2016, Montgomery was elected to the board of Chamber Music America.

In 2019, Fanfare also discussed her multicultural New York influences, noting that listeners could expect to hear "English consort, samba, mbira, Zimbabwean dance, swing, techno... occasionally veering, somewhat ecstatically, towards a modern jazz jam session" in her work.

She is part of the duo big dog little dog with bassist Eleonore Oppenheim. New Amsterdam released their first record in 2019.

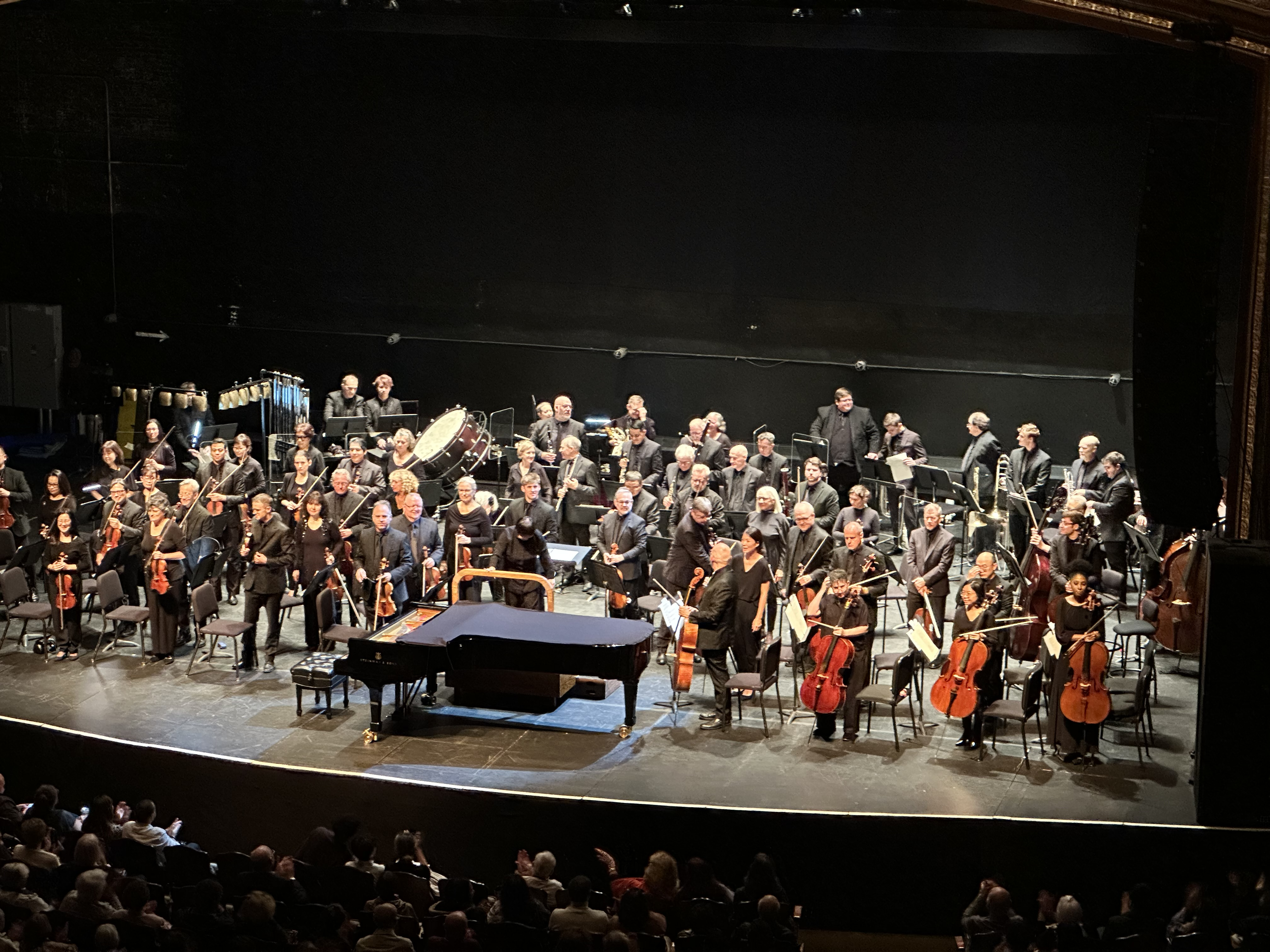
Conductor Xian Zhang and the New Jersey Symphony receiving applause after their 2025 performance of Montgomery's Hymn For Everyone

In 2021, she became the Chicago Symphony Orchestra's Meade Composer-in-Residence. Her 2021 composition, Hymn for Everyone, composed as a response to the COVID-19 pandemic, opens the Grammy-winning album, Contemporary American Composers (2023). Her Strum for String Orchestra and L.E.S. Characters were performed in the Naumburg Orchestral Concerts in the Naumburg Bandshell, Central Park, in the summer series in 2021 and 2023 (the New York premiere), respectively.

== Discography ==
- Bach / Gould Project (2015), Azica
- Strum: Music for Strings (2015), Azica 71302
- Contemporary American Composers (2023), CSO Resound
- Songs for Our Times (2023), Deutsche Grammophon
- Montgomery: Rhapsody No. 1 (2024), Rubicon
- Standard Stoppages (2025), Cedille

== Works ==
- Play (1999), for flute, clarinet, violin, and cello
- Strum (2006, rev. 2012), for string quartet/string quintet/string orchestra
- Voodoo Dolls (2008), for string quartet/string quintet
- Starburst (2012), for string orchestra
- Break Away (2013), for string quartet
- Source Code (2013), for string quartet/string orchestra
- Banner (2014), for solo string quartet and string orchestra (version for solo string quartet and chamber orchestra, 2017)
- Cadenzas (2014), for Cello Concerto No. 2 in D Major by Joseph Haydn
- In Color (2014), for tuba and string quartet
- Rhapsody No. 1 (2014), for solo violin (version for solo viola, 2021; version for solo cello, 2022)
- Duo (2015), for violin and cello
- I Want To Go Home (2015, rev. 2021), for soprano and string quartet/string quintet/string orchestra
- Soul Force (2015), for orchestra
- Caught by the Wind (2016), for orchestra
- Danse Africaine (2016), for SSAA choir
- Loisaida, My Love (2016), for mezzo-soprano and cello
- Records from a Vanishing City (2016), for orchestra
- Coincident Dances (2017), for orchestra (version for concert band, 2024)
- Tower City (2018), for solo carillon
- Lunar Songs (2019), for voice and string quartet
- Passage (2019), for flute, clarinet, horn, and string quartet (version for orchestra, 2022)
- Shift, Change, Turn (2019), for chamber orchestra
- D Major Jam! (2020), for string ensemble
- I Have Something to Say (2020), for SATB chorus, children's choir, and orchestra
- Peace (2020), for clarinet/violin and piano (version for viola and piano, 2022; version for cello and piano, 2023; version for bassoon and piano, 2026)
- Rhapsody No. 2 (2020), for solo violin (version for solo viola, 2021)
- Because (2021), for narration and orchestra
- Five Freedom Songs (2021), for voice, percussion, and string orchestra
- Hymn for Everyone (2021), for orchestra
- L.E.S. Characters (2021), for solo viola and orchestra
- Passacaglia (2021), for flute quartet
- Divided (2022), for solo cello and string orchestra
- Overture (2022), for orchestra
- Rounds (2022), for piano and string orchestra
- Musings (2023), for two violins
- Snapshots (2023), for orchestra
- Space (2023), for solo violin and orchestra
- Study No. 1 (2023), for percussion quartet
- Transfigure to Grace (2023), for orchestra
- Concerto Grosso (2024), for oboe/clarinet, harp/piano, violin solo, and string quintet
- Procession (2024, rev. 2026), for solo percussion and orchestra
- Chemiluminescence (2025), for string orchestra
- Flight (2025), for solo cello
- Rhapsody No. 3 (2026), for solo violin
- These Righteous Paths (2026), for solo cello and orchestra
