= Sarah Goddard Power =

University of Michigan regent (1935–1987)

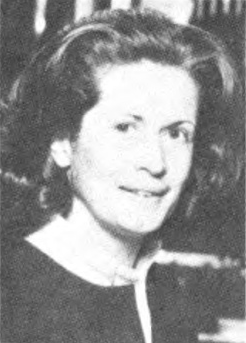
- Sarah Goddard Power c. 1975
- Born: Sarah Goddard; June 19, 1935; Detroit, Michigan, U.S.
- Died: March 24, 1987 (aged 51); Ann Arbor, Michigan, U.S.
- Resting place: Forest Hill Cemetery, Ann Arbor, Michigan
- Education: Vassar College; New York University

Sarah Goddard Power (June 19, 1935 – March 24, 1987) was a United States Democratic Party activist and University of Michigan Regent. She was a Democratic National Convention delegate in 1976 and she was a Deputy Assistant Secretary of State for Human Rights and Humanitarian Affairs in 1980 and 1981. She died by suicide on the University of Michigan campus in 1987.

== Early life ==
Born in Detroit in 1935 and a graduate of Vassar College, Goddard also received a diploma in French at the Alliance Francaise in Paris and a master's degree in politics and international relations from New York University in 1965.

== Career ==
After serving as an executive assistant on the personal staff of Governor Nelson A. Rockefeller (the leading liberal Republican) from 1959 to 1963, she married newspaper publisher Phillip Power. From 1966 to 1969, Sarah Power was executive director of the New York City Commission for the United Nations and Consular Corps in the administration of Mayor John V. Lindsay. She chaired the U.S. national commission for UNESCO, and was a delegate to four worldwide United Nations-related conferences.

Elected a University of Michigan Regent in 1974, she was a supporter of Jimmy Carter and served as a delegate to Democratic National Convention in 1976. In 1980, Carter named her deputy assistant secretary of state for human rights and social affairs, U.S. Department of State, a position she held until 1981, when she returned to the university.

== Death ==
On March 24, 1987, Sarah Goddard died by suicide by jumping to her death from the eighth floor of the 212-foot-high Burton Tower.

After her death, the Burton Tower's structure was modified, with the addition of stops to prevent windows from opening more than a few inches.

== Legacy ==
Michigan governor James Blanchard appointed Phil Power to his wife's Regents seat; he served in that capacity until he was defeated in a close four-way election in 1998. Phillip's father, Eugene B. Power, had also served as a U of M Regent, from 1955 to 1971.

The Sarah Goddard Power Distinguished Service Award is given every year at the University of Michigan for "significant achievement in contributing to the betterment of women in the following areas: distinguished leadership, scholarship, or other activities related to their professional lives."

Sarah Power was inducted into the Michigan Women's Hall of Fame in 1988.
