= Joseph G. Gavin Jr =

American engineer (1920–2010)

Joseph G. Gavin Jr. (September 18, 1920 – October 30, 2010) was an American engineer responsible for the development of the Lunar Module used in the Apollo program, as well as president, chief operating officer and chairman of the executive committee of the Grumman Corporation.

He was director of the Lunar Module program for Apollo. In that capacity he managed the team of 7,500 people which oversaw landing of the lunar module on the Sea of Tranquility on the Moon, on July 20, 1969. He was also critical to saving the Apollo 13 mission. Gavin was also in charge of development of Orbiting Astronomical Observatory at Grumman.

In 1971, Gavin received NASA's Distinguished Public Service Medal for his role in resolving the Apollo 13 crisis. He was elected to the National Academy of Engineering in 1974 "for leadership in the design and the production of the Apollo Lunar Module". Neil Armstrong called him a "highly regarded aerospace engineer".

== Chronology ==
- 1920: born on September 18 in Somerville, Massachusetts
- 1937: graduated Boston Latin School
- 1941: B.S. in aeronautical engineering, Massachusetts Institute of Technology
- 1942: M.S. in aeronautical engineering, Massachusetts Institute of Technology
- 1942–1946: officer with U.S. Navy
- 1946–1985: career with Grumman
  - 1946: joined Grumman, a design engineer
  - 1957: chief missile and space engineer at Grumman, in charge of development of Orbiting Astronomical Observatory
  - 1962-1972: Vice President and Director, Lunar Module Program, Project Apollo
  - 1974: elected to the National Academy of Engineering
  - 1976: president and Chief Operating Officer of Grumman
  - 1985: retirement from Grumman
- 2010: died on October 30
