= Burton Memorial Tower =

Bell tower in Ann Arbor, Michigan, US

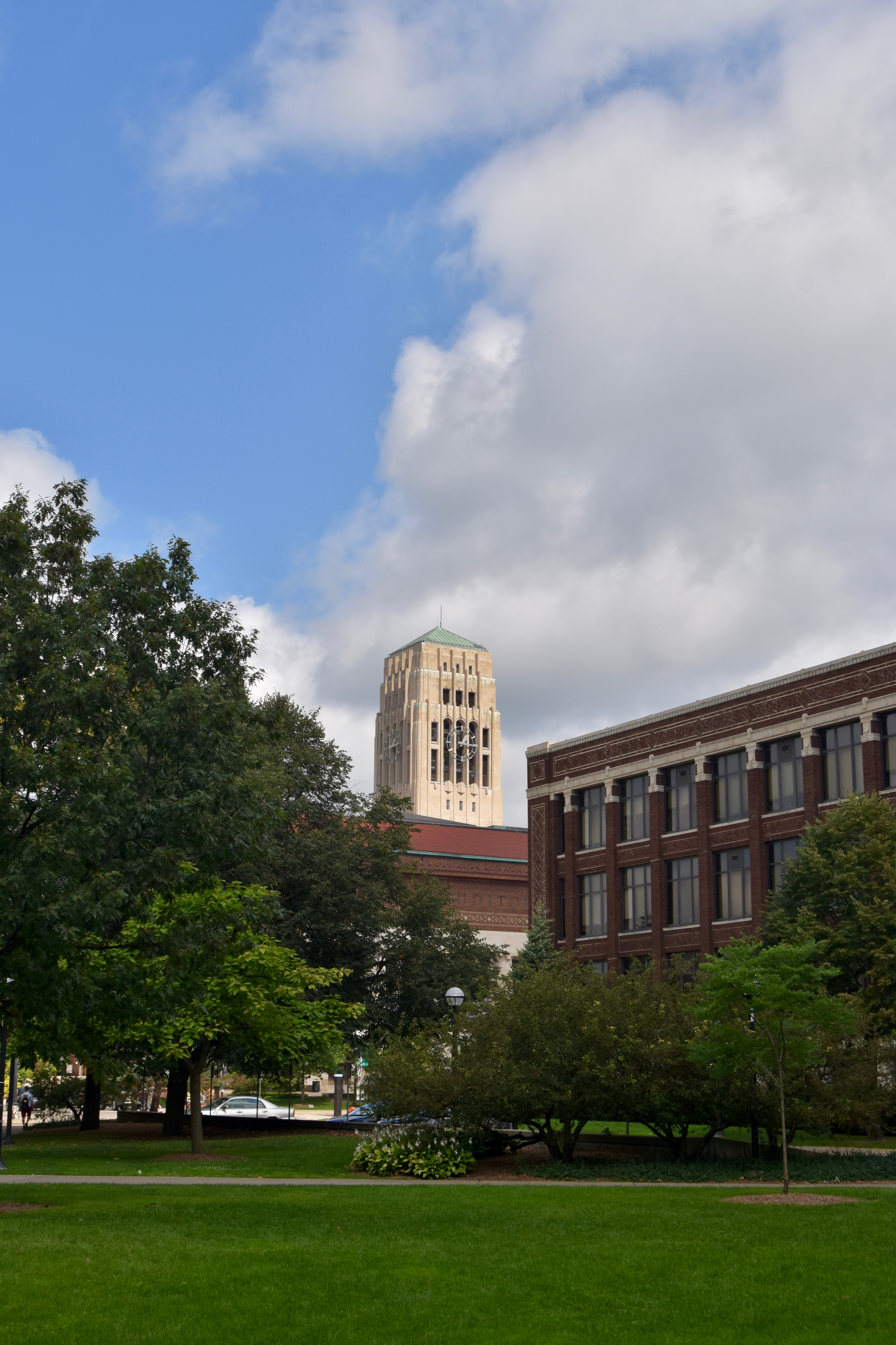
- Interactive map of the Burton Memorial Tower area

Record height
- Tallest in Ann Arbor from 1936 to 1967^{[I]}
- Preceded by: St. Thomas the Apostle Catholic Church (Ann Arbor, Michigan)
- Surpassed by: Tower Plaza

General information
- Architectural style: Art Deco, art moderne
- Location: 230 North Ingalls Street, Ann Arbor, Michigan
- Coordinates: 42°16′45.9″N 83°44′18.5″W
- Year built: 1935-1936

Height
- Height: 192 ft (59 m)

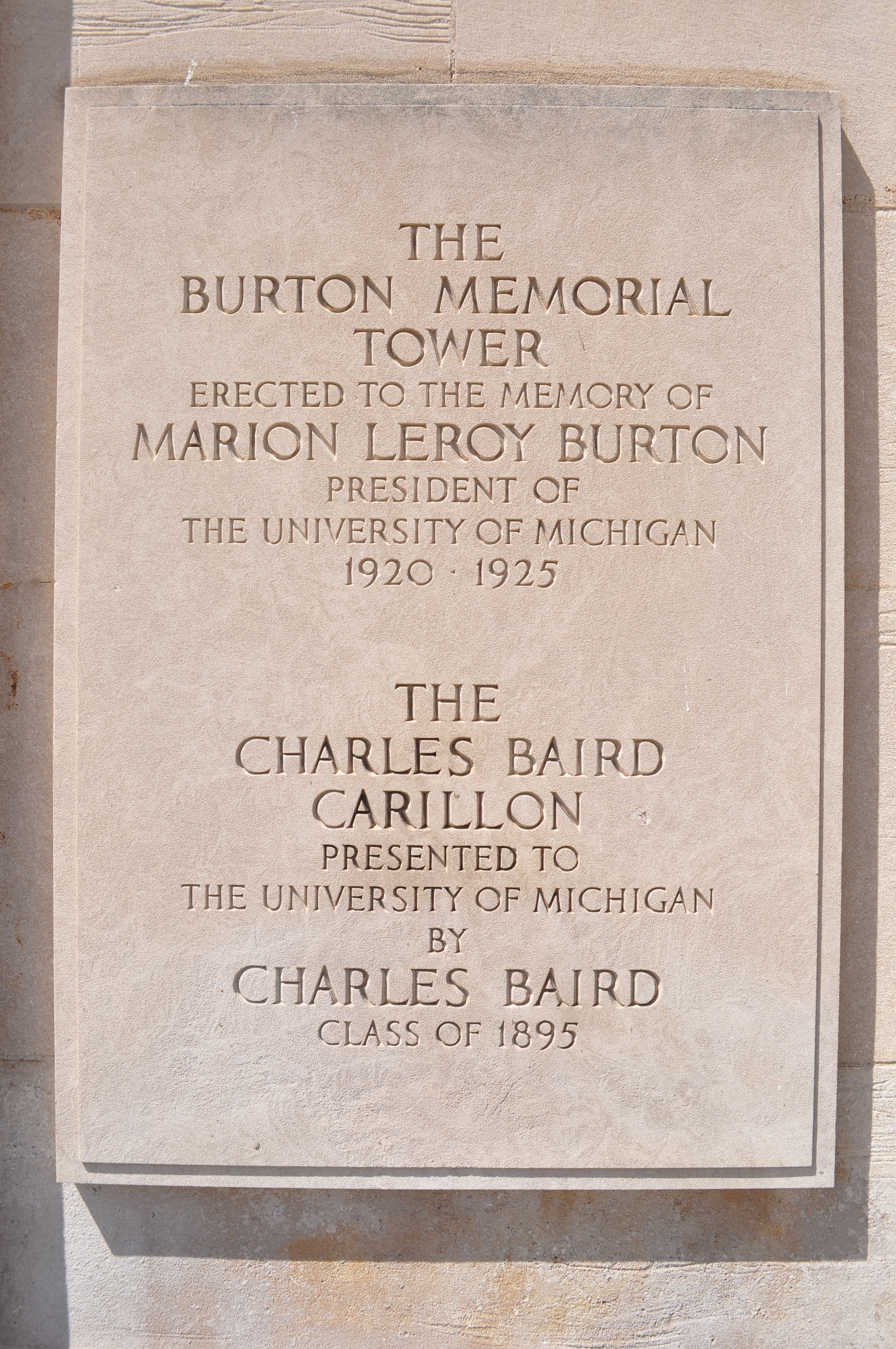
The plaque on Burton Tower

The Burton Memorial Tower is a clock tower located on Central Campus at the University of Michigan in Ann Arbor at 230 North Ingalls Street. Housing a grand carillon, the tower was built in 1936 as a memorial for University President Marion Leroy Burton (presidency: 1920–1925). This carillon is the world's fourth-heaviest, containing 53 bells and weighing a total of 43 tons.

== History ==
The monument was constructed in 1935 and finished in 1936. It stands at 192 feet, with the floor of the bell chamber at 120 feet from the ground. It is located at the University of Michigan campus, and is used for housing education offices. The high-rise tower was designed in an interesting mixture of Art Deco and art moderne architectural styles, constructed with a reinforced concrete shell faced with limestone over a plan 42 feet (13 m) square. The design was greatly influenced by Eliel Saarinen, who had submitted an earlier scheme. At the top is the 43-ton, 53-bell Baird Carillon. The tower chimes the Westminster Quarters every quarter hour in the key of E-flat.

While this building houses a memorial carillon, it is primarily a conventional high-rise, contains classrooms for the University of Michigan's school of music, and houses offices for the departments of musicology, ethnomusicology, musical theatre and for the University Musical Society.

The Burton Memorial Tower was designed by Albert Kahn, who also designed the William L. Clements Library, Angell Hall, and Hill Auditorium for the University of Michigan. Its carillon was donated by Michigan alumnus Charles A. Baird, a lawyer and the first U-M athletic director, and has been christened the "Charles Baird Carillon". Baird had the bells cast in England and gave them to the university. He also commissioned “Sunday Morning in Deep Waters”, the fountain on Ingalls Mall between Burton Tower and the Michigan League.

After University of Michigan Regent Sarah Goddard Power committed suicide by jumping to her death from the eighth floor of Burton Tower in 1987, slight modifications were made to the structure, such as the addition of stops to prevent windows from opening more than a few inches.

The University of Michigan campus has two of only twenty-three grand carillons in the world, barely two miles apart. The other is housed at the Ann and Robert H. Lurie Tower on the North Campus.

On April 8, 2017, in celebration of the university's bicentennial, the tower was illuminated in maize and blue, the university's colors. The carillon and spire can also be lit in other colors by the LED illumination system installed for the bicentennial.

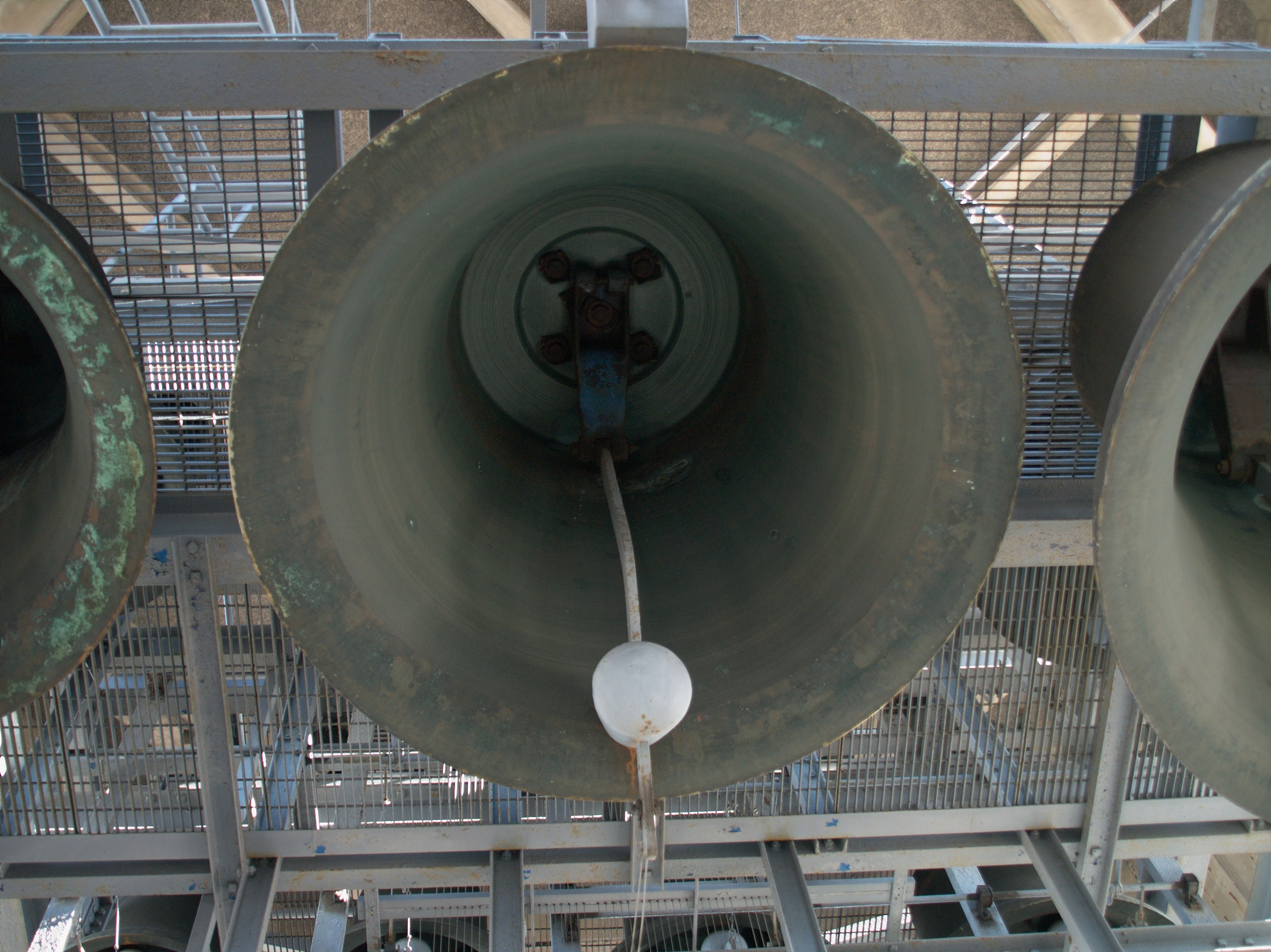
Upwards view into a middle-register bell of the Charles Baird Carillon

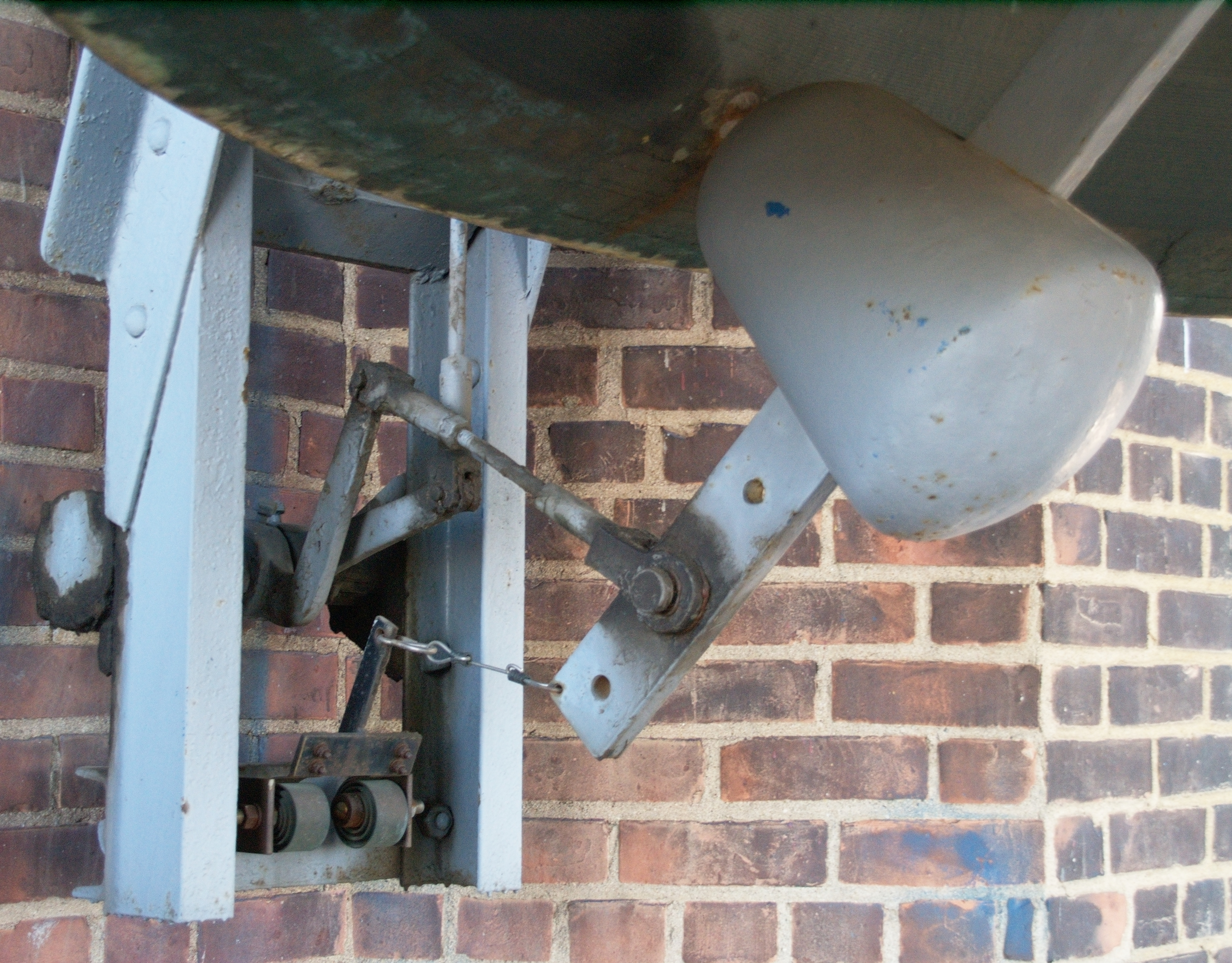
The clapper of one of the largest bells in the Charles Baird Carillon

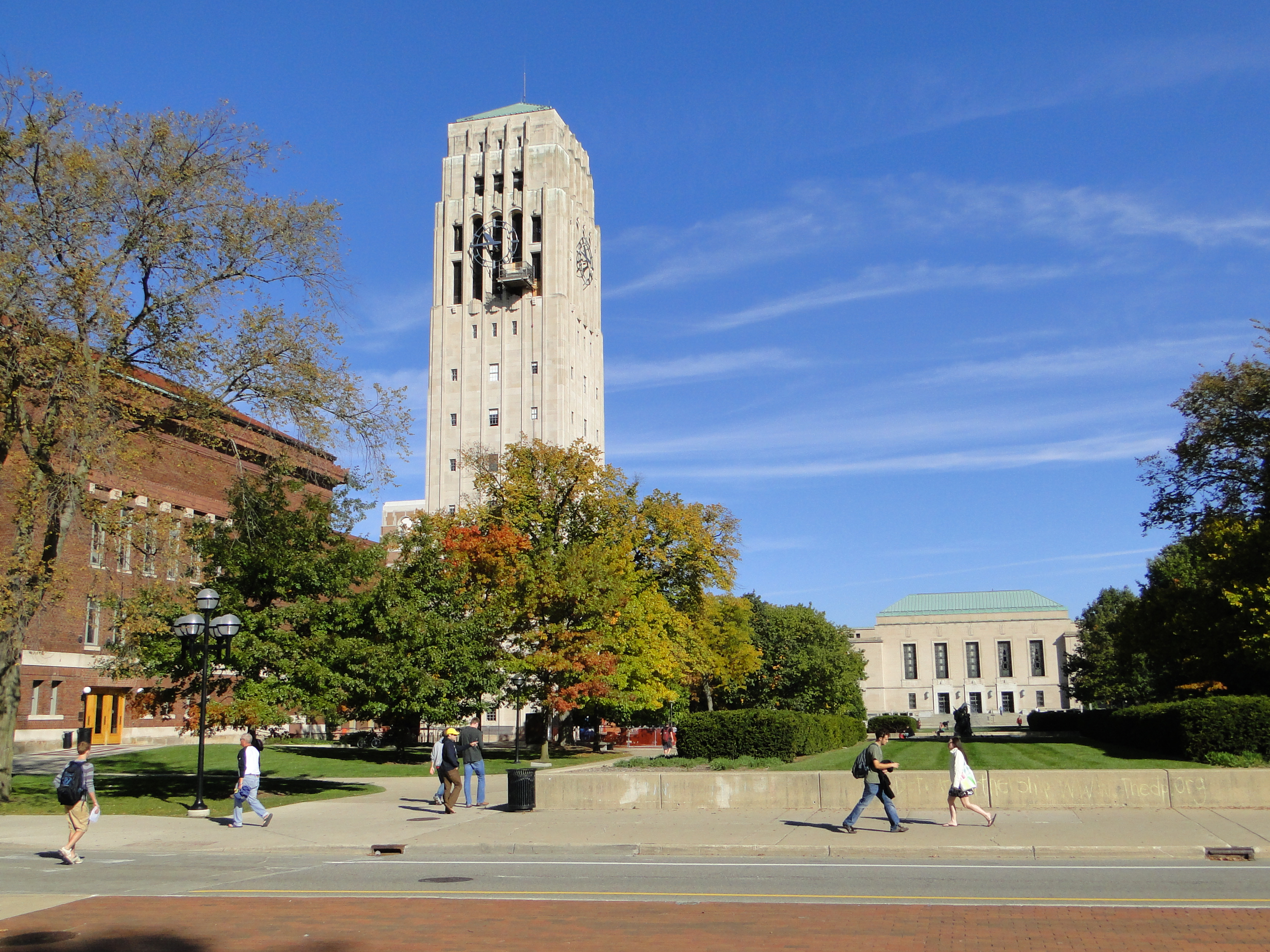
View of Burton Memorial Tower from N. University Avenue

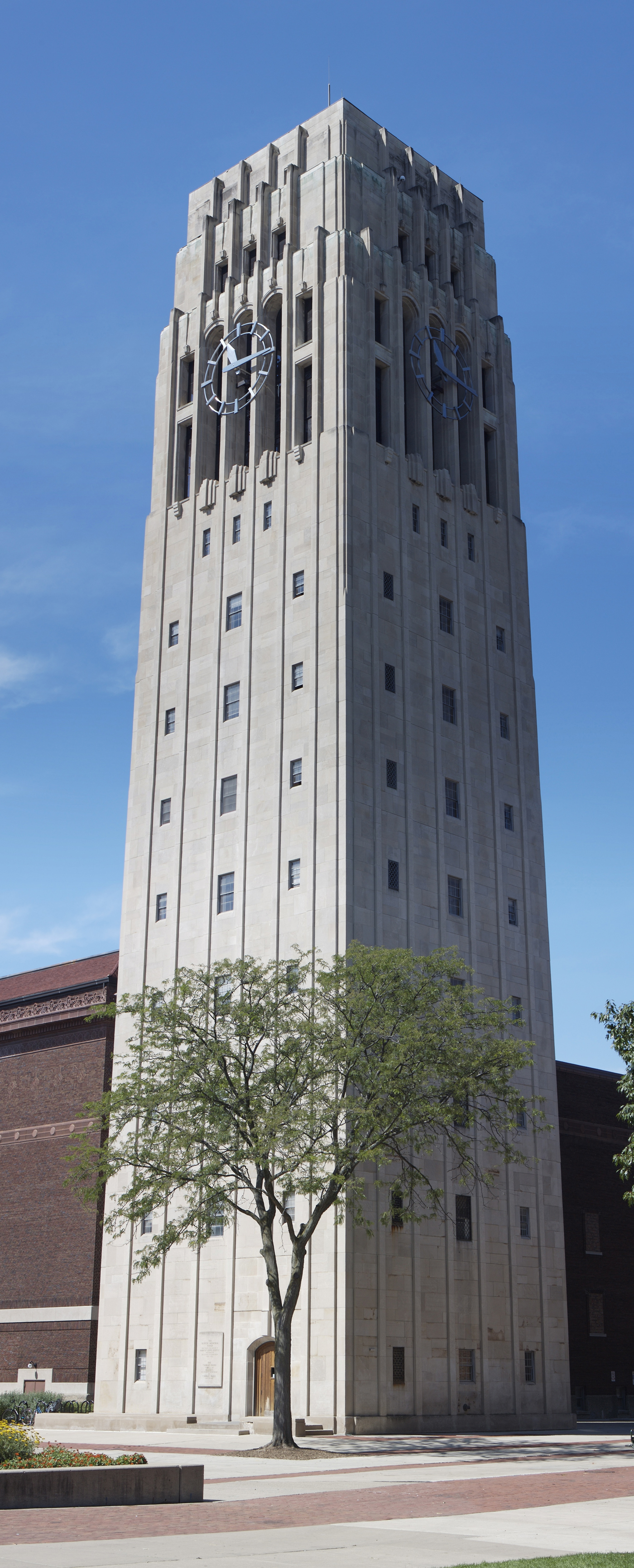
Burton Memorial Tower

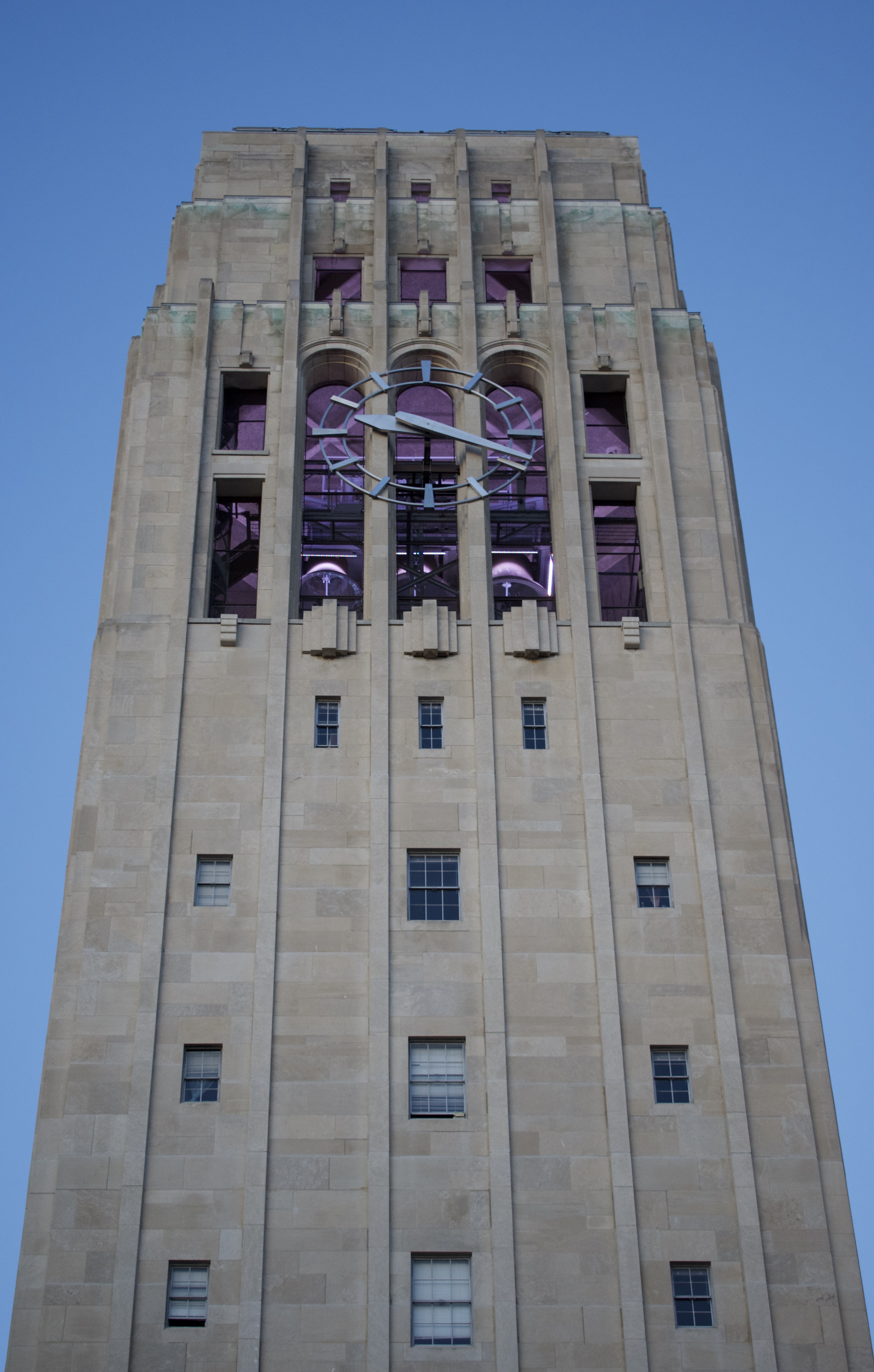
The bicentennial illumination system lights up the tenth floor belfry

== Statistics ==
=== The tower ===
- Building height: 212 feet (65 m)
- Tower specification: 41 feet (12 m) x 7 inches square
- Floor area: 19,848 square feet (1,843.9 m^{2})
- Designer: Albert Kahn
- Final cost (1936): $243,664.61
- Recent renovation cost: $1.8 million
- Construction date: 1935 to 1936
- Construction materials: reinforced concrete shell, faced with limestone
- Dedicated on: December 4, 1936
- Dedicated to: U-M President Marion Leroy Burton (Presidency 1920–1925)

=== Charles Baird Carillon ===
- Location: Atop the Burton Memorial Tower
- World position: Tied for fourth heaviest carillon in the world
- Technical Specification:
  - No. of bells: 53
  - Total weight 43 tons
  - Largest bell: 12 tons; strikes every hour
  - Smallest bell: 16.5 pounds
  - Height of support: Bells hang 120 feet (37 m) above campus
  - Others: Bells are stationary, and only the clappers move via mechanical linkage
- Cast by: John Taylor Bellfoundry, in Loughborough, England, in 1936 and 1975
- Current carillonist: Tiffany Ng

== See also ==
- List of carillons in the United States
