= Lurie Tower =

Bell tower in Ann Arbor, Michigan, US

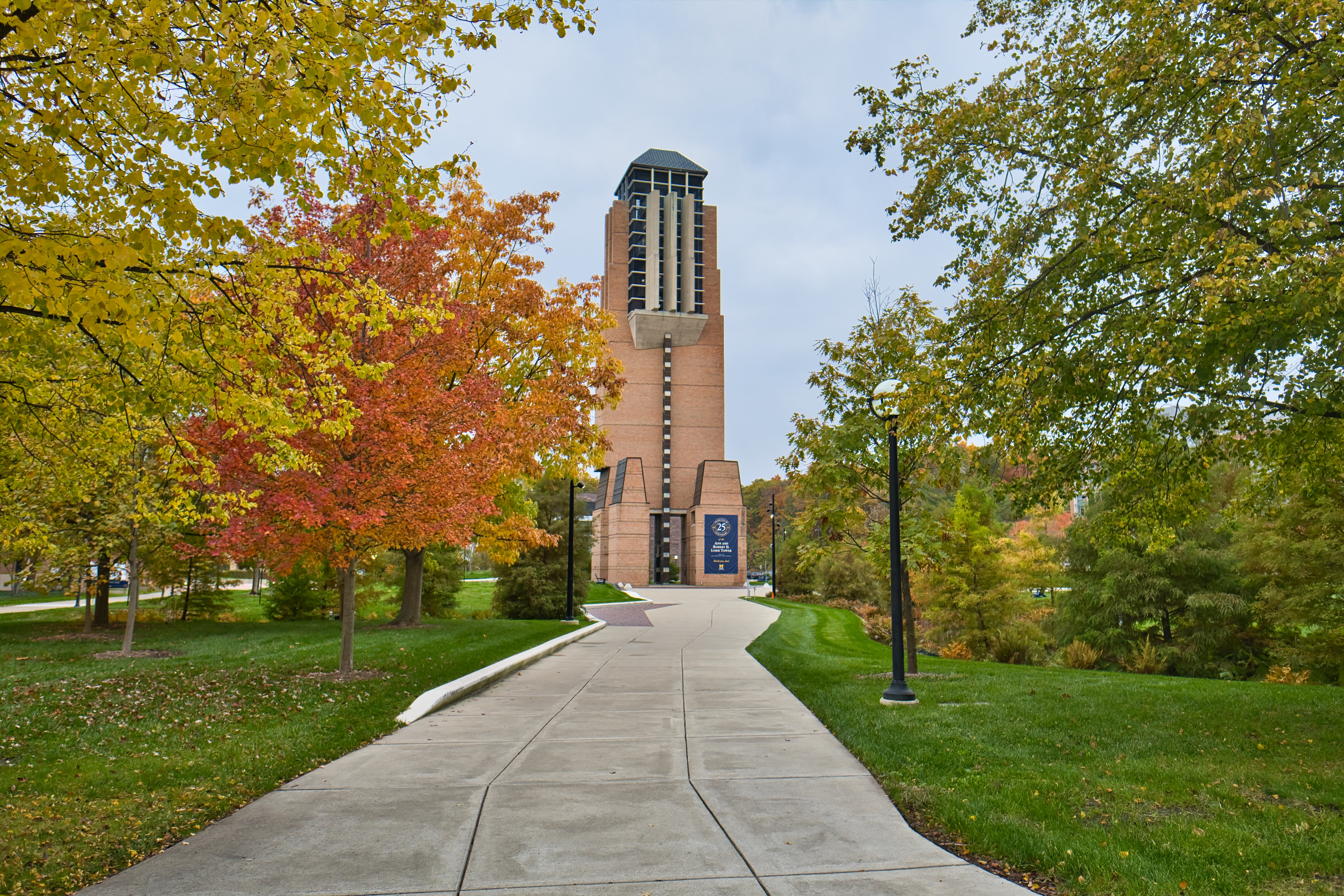
- Interactive map of the Lurie Tower area

General information
- Location: University of Michigan North Campus, Ann Arbor, Michigan, United States
- Coordinates: 42.292°N 83.716°W
- Inaugurated: 1996; 30 years ago

Height
- Height: 167 feet (51 m)

Design and construction
- Architect: Charles Moore

The Ann and Robert H. Lurie Tower, a memorial built in 1996 for Michigan alumnus Robert H. Lurie, is located on North Campus at the University of Michigan in Ann Arbor. It houses a 60-bell grand carillon, one of the university's two grand carillons; the other is housed in Burton Tower on Central Campus. These are two of only 23 grand carillons in the world.

== Design and history ==
The Lurie Tower was designed by Michigan alumnus Charles Moore (AB '47, Hon Arch Ph.D. '92), with structural engineering done by Robert M. Darvas Associates. The tower was dedicated in October 1996. A gift of the Ann and Robert H. Lurie Family Foundation, it has 60 bells. Ann Lurie of Chicago donated $12 million in memory of her husband, Robert H. Lurie (BSE '64, MSE '66), to help fund the construction of North Campus buildings, including the bell tower. Completed in late 1995, the 167-foot (51 m) tall tower is a significant landmark on North Campus.

The bronze bells of the Lurie Carillon are lighter in weight than the bells of the carillon in Burton Memorial Tower. They were cast at the Royal Eijsbouts bell foundry in Asten, Netherlands, in the customary proportion of 80 percent copper to 20 percent tin. The North Campus bourdon bell weighs six tons.

== Carillonists ==
- Margo Halsted (1996–2003)
- Steven Ball (2008–2013)
- Tiffany Ng (2015– )

== See also ==
- List of carillons in the United States
