= Sophia (given name) =

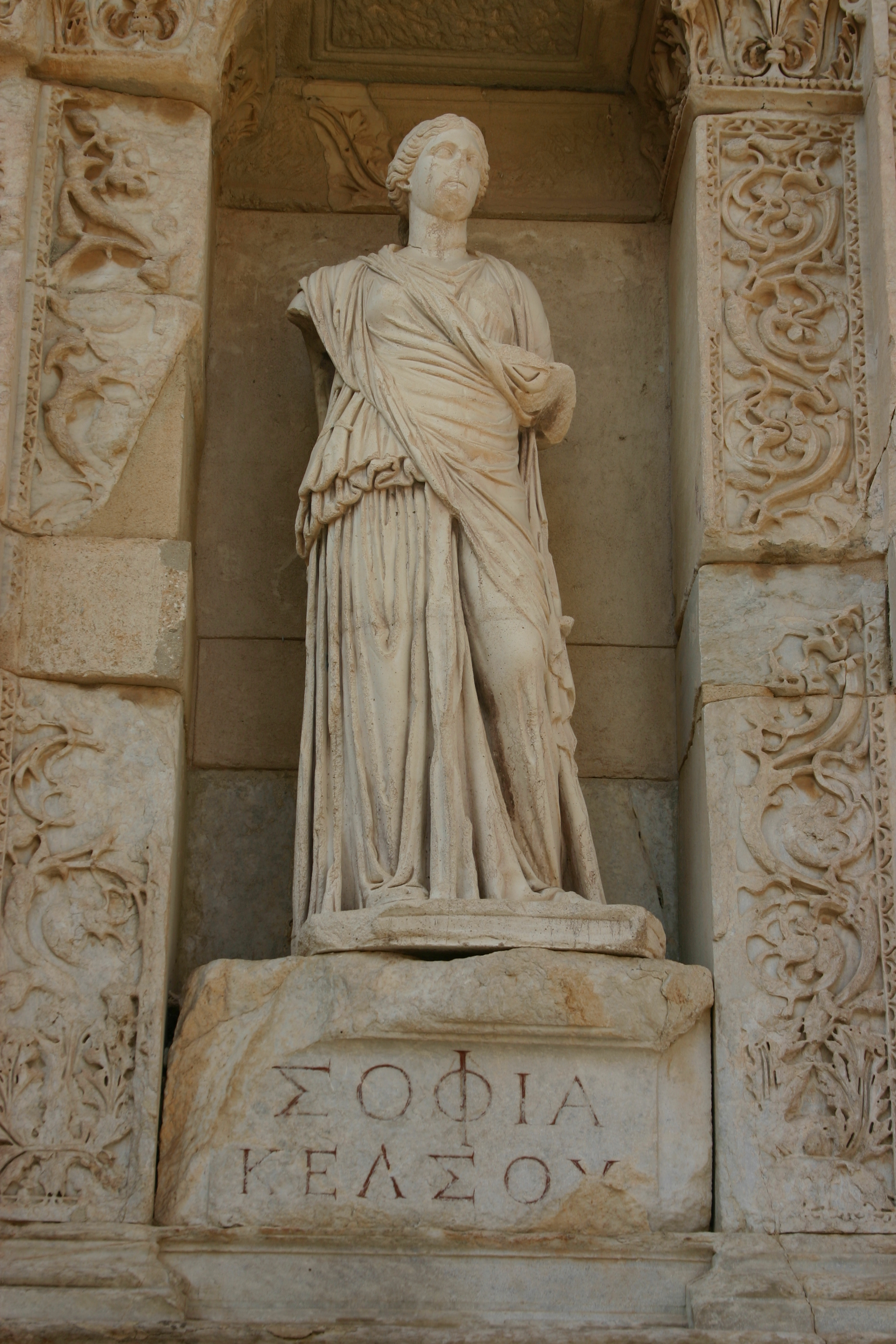
- A statue of Sophia, the personification of wisdom, in the Celsus Library in Ephesus, Turkey.
- Gender: feminine

Origin
- Origin: Greek
- Derivation: from Greek Σοφία, Sophía
- Meaning: Wisdom
- Region of origin: Byzantine Empire

Other names
- Alternative spelling: Sofia
- Variant forms: Sophie, Sophy, Sofie
- Related names: Sofija, Sofiya, Sofya, Sophus
- See also: Sonia

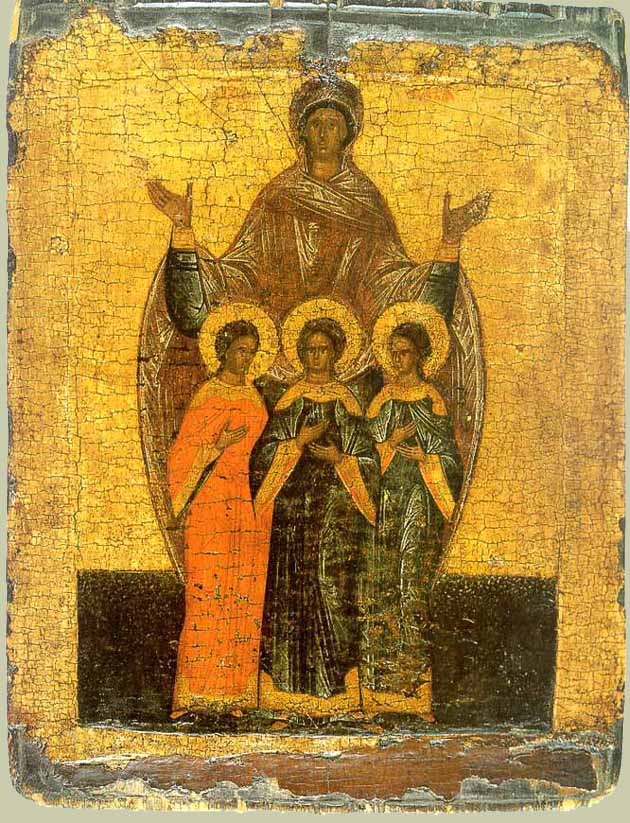
A depiction of Saint Sophia and Her Three Daughters, Faith, Hope and Charity (icon of the Novgorod school, 16th century).

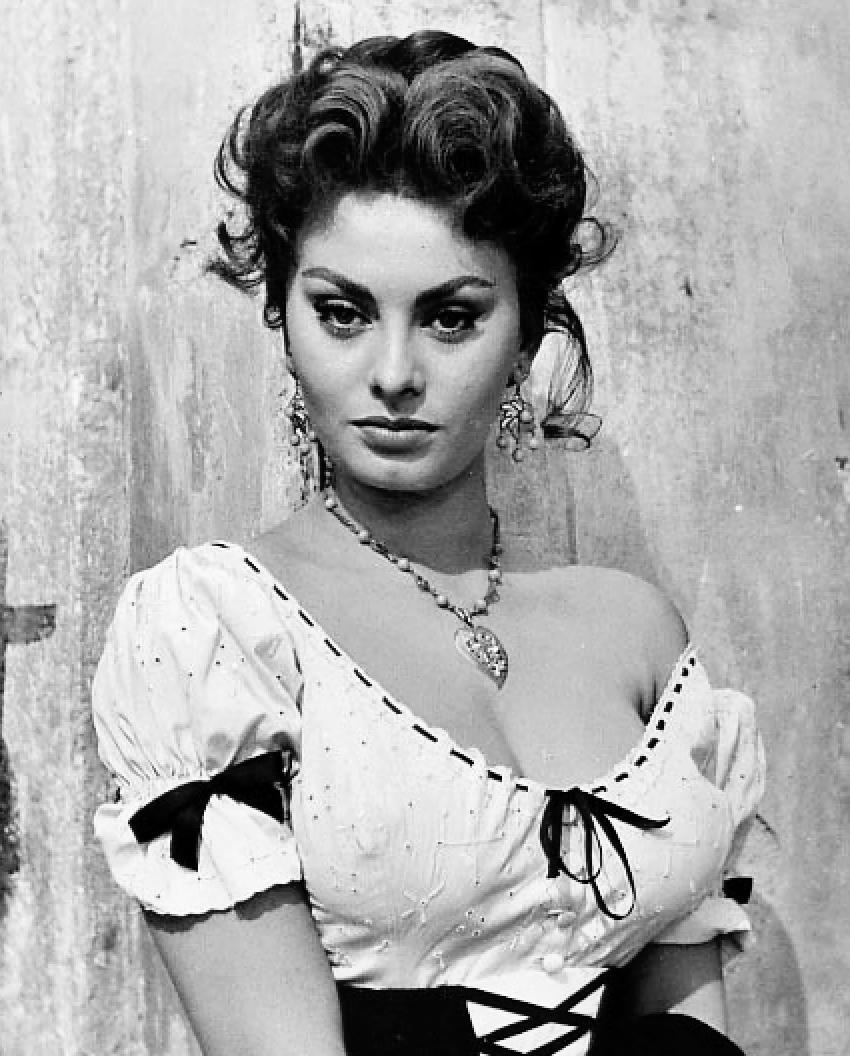
Sophia Loren in 1955

Sophia, also spelled Sofia, is a feminine given name, from the Greek personification of wisdom (Greek: Σοφία, romanized: Sophía). Other forms include Sophie, Sofiya, Sofija, Sophy, Sophea, and Sofie.

== History ==
The given name is first recorded in the beginning of the 4th century.

== Popularity ==
Sophia is a common female name in the Eastern Orthodox countries. It became very popular in the West beginning in the later 1990s and became one of the most popularly given girls' names in the Western world in the first decades of the 21st century.

Sophia was known as the personification of wisdom by early Christians and Saint Sophia is also an early Christian martyr. Both associations contributed to the usage of the name. The name was comparatively common in continental Europe in the medieval and early modern period. It was popularized in Britain by the German House of Hanover in the 18th century.

It was repeatedly popularised among the wider population, by the name of a character in the novel Tom Jones (1749) by Henry Fielding, in The Vicar of Wakefield (1766) by Oliver Goldsmith, and in the 1960s by Italian actress Sophia Loren (b. 1934).

Sophia was comparatively popular in the United States in the late 19th and early 20th century; its use declined in the 1920s to 1950s; it became again moderately popular during the 1960s and increased in use.

During the 1990s to the 2010s, the popularity of the name rose dramatically in many countries throughout the western world. Suggested influences for this trend include Sofía Vergara and Sofia Coppola (popular from the late 1990s) and Sofia Hellqvist (popular from the 2000s). Sophia and variants of the name remain among the most currently popularly given names for girls in countries across Europe as well as countries in North and South America, Australia, New Zealand, and others.

In 2022, Sophia was the fifth most popular name given to girls in Canada, while Sofia was 13th.

== Name variants ==
Greek Σοφία was adopted without significant phonological changes into numerous languages, as Sophia (German, and thence English) and Sofia (Romance languages, and thence also to Germanic languages and Finnish, etc.). The spelling Soffia is Icelandic and Welsh. Hungarian has Zsófia. Modern Spanish uses the acute diacritic, Sofía. South and East Slavic and Baltic languages have Sofija (Софија), Sofiya (София) and Sofya (Софья). West Slavic (Polish and Czech-Slovak) introduced a voiced sibilant, Zofia, Žofia, Žofie.

French has the (disyllabic) hypocoristic Sophie, which was also introduced in German, Dutch/Flemish, English, and Scandinavian in the spelling Sofie and Sophy. A Dutch hypocoristic is Sofieke. Russian has the hypocoristic Соня (Sonya), which in the late 19th century was introduced to Western languages, in the spellings Sonya, Sonia and Sonja, via characters with this name in the novels Crime and Punishment by Fyodor Dostoyevsky (1866, English translation 1885) and War and Peace by Leo Tolstoy (1869, English translation 1886).

Turkish Safiye is from the unrelated Arabic Safiyya (صفية "pure").

Persian Sofia (Persian: صوفیا) is from unrelated Sufi, a sect of Islam.

== Saints ==
- Saint Sophia of Milan, feast day 17 September
- Saint Sophia of Rome, martyr, feast day 15 May

== Royalty ==
=== Sofia ===
- Sofia of Bavaria Wittelsbach (1376–1425), Queen of Bohemia
- Queen Sofía of Spain (born 1938), Queen consort of Spain
- Princess Sofia, Duchess of Värmland (born 1984), wife of Prince Carl Philip, Duke of Värmland
- Infanta Sofía of Spain (born 2007), a Spanish princess

=== Sophia ===
- Sophia (530–c. 601), 6th-century Byzantine empress
- Sophia, 10th-century Byzantine empress
- Sophia of Minsk (d. 1198), Danish queen
- Sophia of Halshany (1405–1461), Queen of Poland and Grand Duchess of Lithuania
- Sophia Palaiologina (1455–1503), Grand Duchess of Moscow
- Sophia Stuart (1606), daughter of James VI and I
- Sophia of Hanover (1630–1714), heir to the English throne
- Sophia Dorothea of Schleswig-Holstein-Sonderburg-Glücksburg (1636–1689), German noblewoman
- Sophia Alekseyevna (1657–1704), Russian regent
- Sophia Dorothea of Celle (1666–1726), Duchess of Brunswick-Lüneburg, wife of George I of Great Britain
- Sophia Dorothea of Hanover (1687–1757), Queen Consort of Prussia, daughter of George I of Great Britain
- Sophia Magdalen of Brandenburg-Kulmbach (1700–1770), Queen consort of Denmark-Norway
- Princess Sophia Dorothea of Prussia (1719–1765), daughter of Frederick William I of Prussia and Sophia Dorothea of Hanover
- Margravine Sophia Dorothea of Brandenburg-Schwedt (1736–1798), Duchess of Württemberg
- Sophia Frederica of Mecklenburg-Schwerin (1758–1794), Princess and Duchess of Mecklenburg-Schwerin
- Princess Augusta Sophia of the United Kingdom (1768–1840), Duchess of Brunswick and Lüneburg
- Princess Sophia of the United Kingdom (1777–1848), British princess
- Princess Sophia of Gloucester (1773–1844), British princess
- Sophia Sidney, Baroness De L'Isle and Dudley (1796–1837), daughter of William IV
- Sophia of Nassau (1836–1913), Queen Consort of Sweden and Norway
- Sophia of Prussia (1870–1932), Queen consort of Greece
- Sophia Bulkeley, Scottish Jacobite courtier
- Sophia Campbell (1777–1833), early Australian settler
- Sophia Chichester (1795–1847), English patron of religious and political unorthodoxy
- Sophia Crichton-Stuart, Marchioness of Bute (1809–1859), Scottish noblewoman
- Sophie Dawes, Baronne de Feuchères (1790–1840), British courtesan
- Sophia Desta (1934–2021), Princess of Ethiopia
- Sophia Howe (1762–1835), British noblewoman
- Sophia Kingdom (1775–1855), British aristocrat
- Sophia Magdalena Krag-Juel Vind (1734–1810), Danish nobility
- Sophia Amalia Marschalk, Danish noble and courtier
- Sophia Palaiologina (c. 1449–1503), Byzantine princess
- Sophia Razumovskaya (1746–1803), Russian courtier
- Sophia Sidney, Baroness De L'Isle and Dudley (1796–1837), British baroness
- Sophia Stuart (1606), English princess
- Sophia Sergeyevna Trubetskaya (1836–1898), Russian princess

=== Other versions ===
- Safiye Sultan (1550–1619), wife of Murad III, mother of Mehmed III; originally named Sofia
- Princess Sophie of Greece and Denmark (1914–2001), later Princess of Hesse, Princes of Hannover
- Sophie, Duchess of Edinburgh (born 1965), wife of Prince Edward, Duke of Edinburgh
- Sofya Shcherbatova (1798–1885), Russian philanthropist
- Sofya Urusova (1804–1889), Russian lady-in-waiting and the favourite of Nicholas I

== Arts and entertainment ==
- Sofia (Filipino singer), Filipino singer
- Sofia (Swedish singer) (née Sofia Berntson), Swedish singer
- Sophia Abrahão (born 1991), Brazilian actress
- Sofia Achaval de Montaigu, Argentine fashion model
- Sofia Adlersparre (1808–1862), Swedish artist
- Sophia Agranovich, Ukrainian-American pianist, recording artist and music educator
- Sofia Ahlbom (1803–1868), Swedish artist
- Sophia Ahrens (born 1996), German-English fashion model
- Sofia Akimova (1824–1889), Russian actress
- Sophia Al Maria, Arabic-American artist, writer and filmmaker
- Sofia Alaoui, French-Moroccan director and screenwriter
- Sofia Alexander, Mexican animator and voice actress
- Sophia Ali (born 1995), American actress
- Sophia Aliberti (born 1963), Greek actress and TV presenter
- Sophia Nahli Allison, American filmmaker and photographer
- Sofia Alves (born 1973), Portuguese actress
- Sofia Amara (born 1968), French-Moroccan journalist
- Sofia Andres (born 1998), Filipina actress and commercial model
- Sophia de Mello Breyner Andresen (1919–2004), Portuguese poet
- Sofia Andrukhovych (born 1982), Ukrainian writer and translator
- Sofia Aparício (born 1970), Portuguese model and actress
- Sofia Areal, Portuguese artist
- Sophia Arvaniti (born 1968), Greek singer
- Sofia Ashraf, Indian rapper and singer
- Sophia Baddeley (1745–1786), English actress
- Sofia Bano (1938–2024), Pakistani film actress
- Sofia Banzhaf (born 1991), Canadian actress and filmmaker
- Sofia Barclay (born 1988), English actress
- Sophia Barclay (born 2000), Brazilian performer
- Sofía Bassi (1913–1998), Mexican artist
- Sophia Beale (1837–1920), British portrait painter
- Sophia Bennett, British writer
- Sofia Black-D'Elia (born 1991), American actress
- Sofía Blanco, Guatemalan singer
- Sofia Bohdanowicz, Canadian film director
- Sofia Boutella (born 1982), French-Algerian actress, model and dancer
- Sofía Bozán (1904–1958), Argentine actress and dancer
- Sophia Briscoe, English author
- Sophia Brous, Australian singer
- Sofia Bryant (born 1999), American-Finnish actress
- Sophia Burrell, English poet and dramatist
- Sophia Bush (born 1982), American actress
- Sophia Cacciola, American film director
- Sophia Alice Callahan (1868–1894), American novelist
- Sofia Camara, (born 2002), Portuguese-Canadian musician
- Sofía Camará (born 1991), Argentine drag performer
- Sofía Cancino de Cuevas (1897–1982), Mexican composer, pianist, opera promoter, singer and conductor
- Sofia Carson (born 1993), American singer and actress
- Sophia Anne Caruso (born 2001), American actress
- Sofía Casanova (1861–1958), Spanish poet, novelist and journalist
- Sofía Castro (born 1996), Mexican actress
- Sophia Chang, Korean-American music director, manager and author
- Sofia Charlebois (1887–1948), American opera singer
- Sofiko Chiaureli (1937–2008), Georgian actress
- Sophia Choi (born 1971), American news broadcaster
- Sofia Asunción Claro (born 1944), Chilean-born classical harpist
- Sofia Coll (born 1999), Spanish singer, dancer and actress
- Sofia Coppola (born 1971), American actress and director
- Sofía Córdova, Puerto Rican artist
- Sofia Crespo (born 1991), Argentine visual artist
- Sophia Dashing, American singer-songwriter
- Sophia de Mello Breyner Andresen (1919–2004), Portuguese poet and writer
- Sofía del Prado (born 1995), Spanish model
- Sophia Dellaporta, Greek composer
- Sophia Delza (1903–1996), American modern dancer, choreographer, author, and practitioner of Wu-style tai chi
- Sofia Depassier, Chilean beauty pageant titleholder
- Sophia Di Martino (born 1983), English actress
- Sofia Djama, Algerian film director
- Sophia Domancich (born 1957), French pianist and jazz composer
- Sophia Dominguez-Heithoff (born 2000), Mexican-American model and beauty queen
- Sophia Dussek (1775–1831), Scottish composer
- Sophia May Eckley (1823–1874), American poet
- Sofia El Marikh (born 1981), Moroccan singer
- Sofia Ellar (born 1993), Spanish singer and songwriter
- Sofia Escobar (born 1984), Portuguese soprano singer and actress
- Sofía Espinosa (born 1989), Mexican actress, writer and director
- Sofia Essaïdi (born 1984), Franco-Moroccan singer
- Sofia Ester, Portuguese writer
- Sophia Everest (born 1992), Burmese singer and actress
- Sophia Ewaniuk (born 2002), Canadian actress
- Sophia Lyon Fahs (1876–1978), American writer
- Sophia Forero (born 1967), American jewelry designer
- Sophia Foster-Dimino, American comics artist and illustrator
- Sophia Fredskild (born 1998), Danish-Malaysian singer-songwriter and composer
- Sofia Fuoco (1830–1916), Italian ballerina
- Sofía Gala (born 1987), Argentine actress
- Sophia Smith Galer (born 1994), British journalist
- Sofía Gallisá Muriente, Puerto Rican visual artist and filmmaker
- Sofía Gandarias (1957–2016), Spanish painter
- Sophia Gennusa (born 2003), American actress
- Sophia George (born 1964), Jamaican singer
- Sophia Gholz (born 1980), American writer
- Sofya Giatsintova (1895–1982), Soviet and Russian film and theatre actress
- Sofia Giordano (1778–1829), Italian artist
- Sofia Gisberg (1854–1926), Swedish sculptor, textile artist and educator
- Sofia Ameli Gojić (born 1968), Croatian mezzo-soprano
- Sofya Gollan, Australian actress
- Sofia Golovkina (1915–2004), Soviet and Russian ballet dancer
- Sofya Goslavskaya, Russian actress
- Sofia Gubaidulina (1931–2025), Russian-Tatar composer
- Sofya Gulyak (born 1979), Russian pianist
- Sophia Hadjipanteli (born 1997), Greek-Cypriot American model
- Sophia Hammons (born 2006), American actress
- Sophia Handa, Indian actress and model
- Sofia Harmanda (born 1996), Greek model and actress
- Sofia Hasmik (born 1991), American actress
- Sofia Hayat (born 1974), British-Indian model and actress
- Sofia Helin (born 1972), Swedish actress
- Sophia McIlvaine Herrick (1837–1919), American writer and editor
- Sophia Hewitt Ostinelli (1799–1845), American classical musician
- Sophia Hoare, British photographer
- Sofia Hoffmann (born 1980), Portuguese-German singer, songwriter and multi-instrumentalist
- Sophia Holt (1658–1734), Dutch painter
- Sofia Hublitz (born 2000), American actress
- Sophia Hull (1786–1858), English writer
- Sophia Hutchins (1996–2025), American talent manager, charity executive, and television personality
- Sophia Isberg (1819–1875), Swedish artist
- Sofia Isella (born 2005), American singer-songwriter and music producer
- Sophia James (born 1999), American singer-songwriter
- Sofia Jannok (born 1982), Swedish Sami singer
- Sofia Jernberg (born 1983), Swedish experimental singer
- Sofía Jirau (born 1997), Puerto Rican fashion model
- Sofia Jozeffi, Russian actress
- Sophia Kalkau, Danish artist
- Sofia Källgren (born 1970), Swedish recording artist and singer
- Sofia Kappel (born 1998), Swedish actress
- Sofia Karemyr (born 1994), Swedish actress
- Sofia Karlberg (born 1996), Swedish singer and songwriter
- Sophia Karp (1861–1904), Romanian actress
- Sofia Karstens, Canadian television and film actress
- Sophia Kennedy (born 1996), American singer-songwriter
- Sofya Khalyutina (1875–1960), Russian and Soviet actress
- Sofia Khvoshchinskaya (1824–1865), Russian painter
- Sophia Kiely (born 2000), English actress
- Sofia Kokkali, Greek actress
- Sophia Kokosalaki (1972–2019), Greek fashion designer
- Sofia Kourtesis (born 1985), Peruvian DJ
- Sophia Ivanovna Kramskaya (1867–1933), Russian artist
- Sophia Kruithof (born 2002), Dutch singer-songwriter
- Sofia Kuvshinnikova, Russian painter
- Sophia La Porta (born 1990), English actress
- Sophia Laforteza (born 2002), Filipino-American singer, dancer and member of girl group Katseye
- Sofía Lama (born 1987), Mexican actress
- Sofia Landon Geier (born 1949), American actress
- Sophia Laskaridou (1882–1965), Greek artist
- Sophia Latjuba (born 1970), Indonesian actress
- Sofia Lebedeva (born 1993), Russian actress
- Sofia Ledarp (born 1974), Swedish actress
- Sophia Lee (1750–1824), English novelist
- Sofia Levin, Australian food journalist
- Sofya Levitina (1877–1950), Soviet actress
- Sofia Levkovskaya (1965–2011), Russian composer
- Sophia Li, Chinese American journalist and film director
- Sofia Liljegren (c. 1765–1795), Swedish-Finnish soprano
- Sophia Lillis (born 2002), American actress
- Sophia Lin, American film producer
- Sofia Lisboa, Portuguese singer
- Sophia Locke (born 1985), American pornographic actress
- Sophia Lombardo (born 1955), Italian actress
- Sophia Loren (born 1934), Italian actress
- Sophia Lucia (born 2002), American dancer
- Sofia Maldonado, Puerto Rican artist
- Sophia Martineck, German illustrator, designer and comics artist
- Sofia Martins de Sousa (1870–1960), Portuguese painter
- Sofia Masson (born 1998), American actress
- Sofia Mattsson, Swedish-American actress
- Sofia Mazagatos (born 1974), Spanish model, actress and television presenter
- Sophia McDougall (born 1979), British author
- Sofia Mechetner (born 2000), Israeli model
- Sofya Melikyan (born 1978), Armenian pianist
- Sophia Mendonça (born 1997), Brazilian writer
- Sophia Mengrosso, Russian-American singer-songwriter
- Sophia Michahelles (born 1976), American puppeteer
- Sofia Milos (born 1969), Swiss actress
- Sophia Minnaert, American journalist
- Sofia Mogilevskaya (1903–1981), Russian children's writer
- Sophia Montecarlo (born 1986), Filipino musician
- Sophia Augusta Moore (1861–1945), New Zealand artist
- Sofia Moran (born 1940), Filipina actress, singer and record artist
- Sophia Mort (1807–1882), British children's author
- Sofia Moshevich, Ukrainian-born pianist
- Sophia Myles (born 1980), English actress
- Sophia A. Nelson (born 1967), American author and journalist
- Sofia Nerbrand (born 1973), Swedish journalist
- Sofía Nieto (born 1984), Spanish actress
- Sofia Nikitchuk (born 1993), Russian model
- Sofia Niño de Rivera (born 1981), Mexican stand-up comedian and actress
- Sofia Nizharadze (born 1985), Georgian singer, actress and songwriter
- Sofia Nolan (born 1999), Australian actress
- Sofía Oria (born 2002), Spanish actress
- Sofía Osío (born 2000), Colombian model
- Sofía Otero (born 2013), Spanish actress
- Sofia Oxenham, English actress
- Sofia Pablo (born 2006), Filipina actress and commercial model
- Sofia Papaioannou, Greek journalist and television host
- Sophia Yakovlevna Parnok (1885–1933), Russian poet
- Sophia Patsalides (born 2000), Greek Cypriot singer
- Sofia Pekkari (born 1985), Swedish actress
- Sofia Pernas (born 1989), American actress
- Sofia Petropoulou (born 1964), Greek painter
- Sophia Powers (born 2009), Canadian actress
- Sofía Reca (born 1984), Argentine actress
- Sofía Recondo (born 1985), Argentine actress
- Sofia Rei, Argentine musician
- Sophia Reid-Gantzert (born 2010), Canadian actress and dancer
- Sophia Reuter (born 1971), German violinist
- Sofia Reyes (born 1995), Mexican singer and songwriter
- Sofia Rivera Torres (born 1992), American actress, TV presenter, radio host, internet celebrity and reality television personality
- Sofía Rocha (1967–2019), Peruvian actress
- Sofía Rodríguez (born 1981), Uruguayan journalist and television presenter
- Sophia Romero, American writer
- Sophia Romma (born 1973), American playwright
- Sofía Rosado, Ecuadorian lyrical soprano, pianist, cellist and harpist
- Sofia Rosinsky (born 2006), American actor
- Sofia Rotaru (born 1947), Ukrainian singer
- Sofia Rudieva (born 1990), Russian actress, model and beauty pageant titleholder
- Sofia Samatar (born 1971), Somali-American writer
- Sofia Samoilova (1787–1854), Russian opera singer
- Sofia Santos (1869–1945), Portuguese actress
- Sofia Scalchi (1850–1922), Italian opera singer
- Sophia Mitri Schloss (born 2002), American actress
- Sophia Schröder, 18th-century Swedish soprano
- Sophia Senoron (born 1999), Filipino actress, host, model and a beauty pageant titleholder
- Sophia Sergio (born 1992), Italian beauty pageant titleholder
- Sofia Shamia (born 2004), Ukrainian model
- Sofia Shinas (born 1968), Canadian artist
- Sofía Sisniega (born 1989), Mexican actress
- Sofya Skya (born 1987), Russian ballet dancer and actor
- Sofia Soboleva (1840–1884), Russian writer
- Sophia Somajo (born 1985), Swedish singer-songwriter
- Sofia Sondervan, Dutch-American film producer
- Sofia Sotnichevskaya (1916–2011), Soviet and Russian theatre actress
- Sofia Starnes, American Poet Laureate of Virginia
- Sofía Suescun (born 1996), Spanish television personality, model and influencer
- Sofia Sukhovo-Kobylina (1825–1867), Russian artist
- Sophia Takal (born 1986), American actress, writer and director
- Sofia Talvik (born 1978), Swedish singer-songwriter
- Sofia Tarasova (born 2001), Ukrainian singer and actress
- Sofya Tartakova (born 1989), Russian sports journalist
- Sofía Tartilán (1829–1888), Spanish writer
- Sophia Tatum (born 1999), American actress
- Sophia Tavoularis, Greek stage actress
- Sofia Tekela-Smith (born 1970), New Zealand artist
- Sophia Thomalla (born 1989), German media personality
- Sophia Thoreau (1819–1876), American book editor
- Sophia Tolli, Australian fashion designer
- Sophia Tolstaya (1844–1919), Russian diarist and copyist
- Sofia Tornambene (born 2002), Italian singer
- Sofia Toufa (born 1983), German rapper
- Sofia Trazona (born 2002), Filipino drag performer, dancer, content creator, and former singer
- Sofia Trimarco (born 1999), Italian beauty pageant titleholder
- Sophia Turkiewicz, Australian film and television director
- Sofia Vakman (1911–2000), Soviet and Russian pianist and teacher
- Sofía Valdés, Panamanian singer-songwriter
- Sophia Valverde (born 2005), Brazilian film actress
- Sophia Vari (1940–2023), Greek painter and sculptor
- Sofia Vassilieva (born 1992), American actress
- Sofia Vembo (1910–1978), Greek singer
- Sofía Vergara (born 1972), Colombian model and actress
- Sofia Vicoveanca (born 1941), Romanian folk singer
- Sofia Vitória (born 1979), Portuguese singer
- Sofia Vogiatzaki (born 1971), Greek actress
- Sofía von Ellrichshausen (born 1976), Argentine architect and artist
- Sofia von Porat (born 1989), Swedish writer
- Sophia Vossou (born 1961), Greek singer
- Sofia W. D. (1924–1986), Indonesian actress and film director
- Sophia Wallace, American conceptual artist
- Sophia Wanuna, Kenyan journalist
- Sophia Maria Westenholz (1759–1838), German composer, musician, singer and music educator
- Sofia Wistam (born 1966), Swedish television host
- Sofia Wolfson, American indie rock musician
- Sophia Woodward (born 2004), American actress
- Sofia Wylie (born 2004), American actress
- Sofia Yablonska (1907–1971), Ukrainian-French travel writer and photographer
- Sophia Yan (born 1986), American classical pianist
- Sofía Zámolo (born 1983), Argentine model, actress and TV presenter
- Sofia Zengo Papadhimitri (1915–1976), Albanian painter
- Sofia Zida, Finnish singer and songwriter

== Politics ==
- Sophia Karen Edem Ackuaku (born 1972), Ghanaian politician
- Sophia Adinyira (born 1949), Ghanaian Supreme Court judge
- Sophia Aggelonitis, Canadian politician
- Sophia Akuffo (born 1949), Ghanaian judge
- Sofía Almeida, Ecuadorian politician
- Sofia Amloh (born 1986), Swedish politician
- Sofia Andrade, Portuguese politician
- Sofia Arkelsten (born 1976), Swedish politician
- Sofía Betancourt, American minister
- Sofía Brambilla (born 1980), Argentine politician
- Sofia Carreira (born 1974), Portuguese politician
- Sofía Castro Ríos (born 1970), Mexican lawyer and politician
- Sophia Chan (born 1958), Hong Kong professor and politician
- Sophia Chikirou (born 1979), French politician
- Sophia Chitlik, American politician
- Sophia Chote, Trinidad and Tobago politician
- Sofía Cid (born 1971), Chilean politician
- Sophia Dallas (1798–1869), Second Lady of the United States
- Sophia M. DiCaro, American politician
- Sophia Oboshie Doku, Ghanaian politician
- Sofía Espín, Ecuadorian politician
- Sofia Favero (born 1993), Brazilian politician
- Sofia Firdous (born 1991), Indian politician
- Sofia Fölster (born 1991), Swedish politician
- Sophia Frazer Binns (born 1982), Jamaican politician
- Sofia Galvão (born 1963), Portuguese lawyer and politician
- Sofia Geisler (born 1963), Greenlandic politician
- Sophia Granswed Baat (born 1986), Swedish politician
- Sophia Hall, American judge
- Sofía Hernanz (born 1970), Spanish politician
- Sofia Hjulgrén (1875–1918), Finnish politician
- Sophia Horner-Sam, Ghanaian diplomat
- Sophie in 't Veld (born 1963), Dutch politician
- Sofia Jarl (born 1977), Swedish politician
- Sophia King (born 1966), American politician
- Sophia Kircher (born 1994), Austrian politician
- Sofia Larsen (born 1972), Swedish politician
- Sophia Leung (born 1933), Canadian politician
- Sofia Manzano (born 1971), Brazilian politician
- Sophia Martelly (born 1965), Haitian politician
- Sofia Matos, Portuguese politician
- Sofía Medina de López (died 2017), Colombian politician
- Sophia Moermond (born 1968), Australian politician
- Sofia Mosikatsi (born 1970), South African politician
- Sophia Mwakagenda (born 1970), Tanzanian politician
- Sophia O'Hara (1882–1954), American politician
- Sofia Osmani (born 1979), Danish politician
- Sofía Matilde Joy Redman (1823–1908), First Lady of Costa Rica
- Sofia Ribeiro (born 1976), Portuguese politician
- Sofia Saeed Shah, Pakistani politician
- Sophia Schiebe (born 1989), German politician
- Sophia Shaningwa (born 1959), Namibian politician
- Sophia Simba (born 1950), Tanzanian politician
- Sofia Skönnbrink, Swedish politician
- Sofia Svensson (1873–1923), Swedish politician
- Sophia Swartz, Namibian politician
- Sophia Tesfamariam Yohannes, Eritrean diplomat
- Sofia Vikman (born 1983), Finnish politician
- Sofia Virta (born 1990), Finnish politician
- Sofia Voultepsi (born 1956), Greek politician
- Sophia Y. Vuelo, Hmong-American judge
- Sophia Warren, American politician
- Sofia Westergren, Swedish politician
- Sofia Zacharaki (born 1976), Greek politician

== Science ==
- Sophia Ananiadou, Greek-British computer scientist and computational linguist
- Sophia Brahe (1556–1643), Danish astronomer
- Sofía Calero, Spanish chemist and academic
- Sophia Drossopoulou, Greek computer scientist
- Sophia Eckerson (1880–1954), American botanist and microchemist
- Sophia Economou, American physicist and academic
- Sofia Feltzing (born 1965), Swedish astronomer
- Sophia Getzowa (1872–1946), Belarusian-Israeli pathologist and scientist
- Sophia Hober, Swedish researcher
- Sofya Khafizovna Khakimova (1924–2015), Tajikistani physician
- Sophia Levy (1888–1963), American astronomer and numerical analyst
- Sofia Magid (1892–1954), Soviet ethnographer
- Sofia Mensurado, Portuguese scientist
- Sofia Merajver (born 1953), Argentine medical oncologist
- Sofia Niyozova (1919–2010), Tajik scientist
- Sofia Quaglioni, nuclear physicist
- Sofya Raskhodnikova, American computer scientist
- Sofia Romanskaya (1886–1969), Soviet astronomer
- Sophia Satina (1879–1975), Russian botanist
- Sofia Viktorovna Semikhatova (1889–1973), Soviet geologist and paleontologist
- Sofia Simmonds (1917–2007), American biochemist
- Sofya Georgiyevna Tamamshyan (1901–1981), Soviet botanist

== Sports ==
- Sofia Akateva (born 2007), Russian figure skater
- Sofia Akhmeteli (born 1981), Georgian alpine skier
- Sofia Andler (born 1974), Swedish equestrian
- Sofia Anker-Kofoed (born 1994), Swedish footballer
- Sofia Araújo (born 1994), Portuguese tennis and padel player
- Sofía Arreola (born 1991), Mexican cyclist
- Sofia Arvidsson (born 1984), Swedish tennis player
- Sofia Asoumanaki (born 1997), Greek rower
- Sofia Assefa (born 1987), Ethiopian long-distance runner
- Sofia Åstedt (born 2003), Swedish swimmer
- Sofia Asvesta (born 2000), Cypriot judoka
- Sophia Baram (born 2008), American pair skater
- Sofía Barriguete (born 2000), Spanish cyclist
- Sophia Batchelor (born 1995), New Zealand swimmer
- Sophia Beckmon (born 2005), American athlete
- Sofia Beggin (born 1997), Italian racing cyclist
- Sofia Bekatorou (born 1977), Greek sailor and Olympic gold medalist
- Sofia Beketova (born 1948), Soviet rower
- Sofia Belattar (born 1995), Moroccan judoka
- Sofia Bertizzolo (born 1997), Italian racing cyclist
- Sofya Berultseva (born 2000), Kazakhstani karateka
- Sofia Biryukova (born 1994), Russian figure skater
- Sofia Bleckur (born 1984), Swedish cross-country skier
- Sofia Blokhin (born 2006), Estonian chess player
- Sophia Boman (born 2002), American soccer player
- Sofia Bordinskikh (born 2003), Ukrainian martial artist
- Sophia Bouderbane (born 1995), French karateka
- Sofia Bouftini (born 2002), Moroccan footballer
- Sophia Braun (born 2000), Argentine footballer
- Sofía Cabrera (born 1997), Guatemalan modern pentathlete
- Sofía Cairó (born 2002), Argentine field hockey player
- Sofia Cantore (born 1999), Italian footballer
- Sofía Carchipulla (born 1990), Ecuadorian footballer
- Sofia Ceccarello (born 2002), Italian sports shooter
- Sofia Cedeño (born 2006), Panamanian-American soccer player
- Sofia Cherone (born 1988), Uruguayan handball player
- Sophia Carlotta Chiariello (born 2008), Swiss rhythmic gymnast
- Sofia Collinelli (born 2001), Italian cyclist
- Sofia Colombo (born 2001), Italian footballer
- Sofia Cook (born 2004), American soccer player
- Sofia Corban (born 1956), Romanian rower
- Sofia Costoulas (born 2005), Belgian tennis player
- Sophia Danenberg, American mountain climber
- Sofia Dara (born 1963), Greek swimmer
- Sophia Derivan (born 2000), Irish tennis player
- Sophia Diagne (born 1998), Senegalese swimmer
- Sofia Djelal (born 1983), Algerian Paralympic athlete
- Sofia Domeij (born 1976), Swedish biathlete
- Sofía Domínguez (born 2005), Argentine footballer
- Sophia Dunkley (born 1998), English cricketer
- Sophia Ellis (born 1996), British powerlifter
- Sofia Engström (born 1988), Swedish ice hockey player
- Sofia Ennaoui (born 1995), Polish middle-distance runner
- Sofia Eriksson (born 1979), Finnish football player
- Sofia Esman (born 2008), Ukrainian diver
- Sofia Evdokimova (born 1996), Russian ice dancer
- Sophia Fenwick (born 1992), New Zealand netball player
- Sofía Filipek (born 1994), Chilean field hockey player
- Sofia Finér (born 1976), Swedish tennis player
- Sofía Fiora (born 1996), Argentine judoka
- Sofia Flores (born 2004), Mexican rhythmic gymnast
- Sophia Flörsch (born 2000), German racing driver
- Sofia Frank (born 2005), Filipino figure skater
- Sofya Fyodorova (born 1998), Russian snowboarder
- Sofia García (born 1998), Paraguayan professional golfer
- Sofía García (born 2000), Colombian footballer
- Sophia Gladieux (born 2002), American field hockey player
- Sofia Goggia (born 1992), Italian World Cup alpine ski racer
- Sofía Gómez (born 1992), Colombian freediver and civil engineer
- Sofía Gómez Villafañe (born 1994), Argentine biker
- Sofia Goncharova (born 1981), Russian archer
- Sophia Hope Gorham (1881–1969), British motorboat racer
- Sophia Gorriaran (born 2005), American athlete
- Sofia Granda, Guatemalan ten-pin bowler
- Sophia Green, Scottish triathlete
- Sophia Gregorevic (born 2005), Australian athlete
- Sophia Griebel (born 1990), German skeleton racer
- Sofia Grönberg-Whitmore (born 1965), Swedish golfer
- Sofia Guellati (born 1992), Algerian footballer
- Sofia Gustafsson (born 1990), Swedish female curler
- Sofia Haajanen (born 1987), Finnish orienteering competitor
- Sophia Hernández (born 1997), Guatemalan modern pentathlete
- Sophia Elizabeth Herzog (born 1997), American swimmer
- Sofia Huerta (born 1992), American professional soccer player
- Sophia Hunter (born 1964), Jamaican hurdler
- Sofia Hurley (born 2004), Australian rules footballer
- Sofia Inguanta (born 1993), Greek footballer
- Sofia Iordanidou (born 1974), Greek volleyball player
- Sofia Iosifidou (born 1981), Greek water polo player
- Sofia Ivanova (born 2005), Bulgarian rhythmic gymnast
- Sofia Jakobsson (born 1990), Swedish footballer
- Sofia Jakovleva (born 2010), Estonian rhythmic gymnast
- Sophia Jensen (born 2001), Canadian sprint canoeist
- Sofia Johansson (born 1969), Swedish footballer
- Sophia Junk (born 1999), German sprinter
- Sofia Kenin (born 1998), American tennis player
- Sophia Kirkby (born 2001), American luger
- Sophia Kleinherne (born 2000), German footballer
- Sofia Kligkopoulou (born 1970), Greek basketball player
- Sophia Koggouli (born 1991), Greek footballer
- Sofya Kondakova (1922–2012), Soviet speed skater
- Sofia Konukh (born 1980), Russian water polo player
- Sofia Kosma (born 1993), Greek volleyball player
- Sofia Kraft (born 1965), Swedish swimmer
- Sophia Kunin (born 1997), American ice hockey player
- Sofia Kvatsabaia (born 1988), Georgian tennis player
- Sofya Lansere (born 2000), Russian tennis player
- Sofia Larsson (born 1988), Swedish discusses thrower
- Sophia Laukli (born 2000), American cross country skier
- Sofia Lavreshina (born 2003), Portuguese sprinter
- Sofia Lewis (born 1998), American soccer player
- Sofia Lind (born 1975), Swedish cross-country skier
- Sofia Lodi (born 1998), Italian rhythmic gymnast
- Sophia Lowenberg (born 2004), American soccer player
- Sofía Luini (born 1992), Argentine tennis player
- Sofia Lundgren (born 1982), Swedish footballer
- Sofia Määttä (born 2004), Finnish footballer
- Sofía Maccari (born 1984), Argentine field hockey player
- Sofía Machado (born 1995), Chilean field hockey player
- Sofía MacKenzie (born 1972), Argentine field hockey player
- Sofia Manner (born 1997), Finnish footballer
- Sofia Marinou, Greek tennis player
- Sofia Martin (born 2005), English field hockey player
- Sofia Mattsson (born 1989), Swedish wrestler
- Sofia Mercedes (born 1976), Dominican Republic volleyball player
- Sophia Miaouli (born 1970), Cypriot sport shooter
- Sofia Middleton (born 1993), Chilean sailor
- Sophia Morgan (born 2003), Fijian sailor
- Sofia Morini (born 2003), Italian swimmer
- Sofía Mulánovich (born 1983), Peruvian surfer
- Sophia Mulsap (born 1990), Thai tennis player
- Sophia Mundy (born 1985), American soccer player
- Sofia Muratova (1929–2006), Russian gymnast
- Sofia Muravieva (born 2006), Russian figure skater
- Sofia Mystrioti (born 1975), Greek alpine skier
- Sofia Nadyrshina (born 2003), Russian snowboarder
- Sophia Nearchou (born 1992), Cypriot footballer
- Sophia Nguyen (born 2003), American soccer player
- Sofia Nuutinen (born 2002), Finnish ice hockey player
- Sofya Ochigava (born 1987), Russian boxer
- Sofía Ochoa (born 1995), Mexican footballer
- Sofía Olivera (born 1991), Uruguayan footballer
- Sofia Olofsson (born 1989), Swedish kickboxer
- Sophia Omotola Omidiji (born 1997), Nigerian footballer
- Sofía Ovando (born 2003), Guatemalan footballer
- Sofía Oxandabarat (born 1994), Uruguayan footballer
- Sofia Pace (born 1994), French Paralympic sprinter
- Sofia Padilla (born 1989), Ecuadorian sports shooter
- Sofía Paiz (born 1997), Salvadoran archer
- Sofia Paldanius (born 1979), Swedish canoeist
- Sofia Papadopoulou (born 1983), Greek sailor
- Sophia Papamichalopoulou (born 1990), Cypriot alpine skier
- Sofia Pelekouda (born 1994), Greek footballer
- Sofia Penkova (born 1979), Bulgarian figure skater
- Sofia Polcanova (born 1994), Moldovan-Austrian table tennis player
- Sofia Polgar (born 1974), Hungarian-born Israeli and Canadian chess grandmaster
- Sofia Polishchuk (born 2001), Russian ice dancer
- Sophia Poor (born 2006), English association footballer
- Sophia Popov (born 1992), German professional golfer
- Sofia Poumpouridou (born 1980), Greek wrestler
- Sofia Pozdniakova (born 1997), Russian sabre fencer
- Sofia Prazeres (born 1974), Portuguese tennis player
- Sofia Prezhyn (born 2010), Israeli rhythmic gymnast
- Sofia Raffaeli (born 2004), Italian rhythmic gymnast
- Sophia Ralli (born 1988), Greek alpine skier
- Sofía Ramallo (born 2001), Argentine field hockey player
- Sofía Ramondegui (born 2001), Uruguayan footballer
- Sofía Ramos Rodríguez (born 2003), Mexican racewalker
- Sofia Reideborn (born 1999), Swedish ice hockey goaltender
- Sofía Reinoso (born 1996), Mexican slalom canoeist
- Sofia Renell (born 1980), Swedish professional golfer
- Sofia Riga (born 1988), Greek runner
- Sofía Rito (born 1985), Uruguayan weightlifter
- Sofia Rodríguez (born 1999), Spanish cyclist
- Sofía Rogoski (born 1998), Spanish field hockey player
- Sofía Roma (born 1996), Puerto Rican basketball player
- Sofia Sakalis (born 2002), Australian soccer player
- Sofia Sakorafa (born 1957), Greek javelin thrower and politician
- Sofia Samavati (born 2000), Danish tennis player
- Sofia Samodelkina (born 2007), Russian figure skater
- Sofia Samodurova (born 2002), Russian figure skater
- Sofia Santacreu (born 2006), Spanish athlete
- Sophia Schaller (born 2000), Austrian figure skater
- Sofia Scharback (born 1993), Swedish curler
- Sophia Schneider (born 1997), German biathlete
- Sophia Schubert (born 1996), American professional golfer
- Sofia Schulte (born 1976), German triple jumper
- Sophia Schwabe (born 2003), German field hockey player
- Sophia Serseri (born 1995), French gymnast
- Sofia Sewing (born 1999), American pickleball and tennis player
- Sofia Sforza (born 1995), Italian ice dancer
- Sofia Shah (born 1997), Nepalese swimmer
- Sofia Shapatava (born 1989), Georgian tennis player
- Sofia Shevchenko (born 2001), Russian ice dancer
- Sophia Shifrin (born 2009), Russian-Israeli figure skater
- Sofia Sicignano (born 2004), Italian rhythmic gymnast
- Sofia Sjöborg (born 1998), Swedish equestrian
- Sofia Skog (born 1988), Swedish footballer
- Sofya Skomorokh (born 1999), Russian rhythmic gymnast
- Sophia Skou (born 1975), Danish swimmer
- Sofia Skriver (born 2003), Danish ice hockey player
- Sophia Smale (born 2004), Welsh cricketer
- Sofia Stefan (born 1992), Italian rugby union player
- Sofia Tanghetti (born 1999), Italian rower
- Sophia Thiel (born 1995), German bodybuilder and fitness blogger
- Sofia Thøgersen (born 2005), Danish runner
- Sofia Thorup (born 1997), Russian-Danish speed skater
- Sofia Tikhonova (born 1998), Russian ski jumper
- Sofía Toccalino (born 1997), Argentine field hockey player
- Sofia Tomasoni (born 2002), Italian kitesurfer
- Sofia Tonelli (born 2007), Italian artistic gymnast
- Sofía Toro (born 1990), Spanish sailor
- Sofia Tsolakidou (born 2006), Greek kickboxer
- Sophia Turner (born 2003), English cricketer
- Sofya Tyutyunina (born 2003), Russian ice dancer
- Sofía Usandizaga (born 1970), Argentine sailor
- Sofía Val (born 2004), Spanish ice dancer
- Sophia Vandagne (born 1979), Seychellois weightlifter
- Sofía Varela (born 1998), Costa Rican footballer
- Sofya Velikaya (born 1985), Russian Olympic fencer
- Sofía Villalba (born 2003), Paraguayan handball player
- Sofía Villarroya (born 1992), Argentine field hockey player
- Sophia Vitas (born 1992), American rower
- Sofia Walbaum (born 1989), Chilean field hockey player
- Sofia Wännerdahl (born 1995), Swedish footballer
- Sophia Warner (born 1974), Paralympian track and field athlete from England
- Sophia Wilson (born 2000), American soccer player
- Sophia Winkler (born 2003), German footballer
- Sophia Witherspoon (born 1969), American former basketball player
- Sofia Wunsch (born 1999), Filipino footballer
- Sophia Yakushina (born 2006), Russian multi-event athlete
- Sofia Yfantidou (born 1985), Greek track and field athlete
- Sophia Young (born 1983), Vincentian-American basketball player
- Sofya Zhuk (born 1999), Russian tennis player

== Other fields ==
- Sophia Adams, British archaeologist and curator
- Sofía Álvarez, multiple people
- Sophia Amoruso (born 1984), American businesswoman
- Sophia Anstice (1849–1926), New Zealand dressmaker, draper and businesswoman
- Sophia Antoniadis (1895–1972), Greek university teacher
- Sophia N. Antonopoulou, Greek economist
- Sophia Armitt (1847–1908), British teacher, writer and naturalist
- Sophia Bardina (1853–1883), Russian revolutionary
- Sophia Bekele, Ethiopian-American businesswoman, entrepreneur, corporate executive and consultant founder CEO of CBS international
- Sofia Berezanska (1924–2024), Ukrainian archeologist
- Sophia Blackmore (1857–1945), Australian missionary
- Sofya Bogomolets (1856–1892), Russian revolutionary
- Sofia Börjesson (born 1964), Swedish professor in Technology Management Department at Chalmers University of Technology
- Sophia Braeunlich (1854–1898), American journalist
- Sophia Elisabet Brenner (1659–1730), Swedish writer, poet, feminist and salon hostess
- Sophia Brown, multiple people
- Sophia Bruun (1987–2010), Danish soldier
- Sofía Castañón (born 1983), Spanish writer and politician
- Sophia Frances Anne Caulfeild (1824–1911), British writer and needleworker
- Sophia Collier (born 1956), American entrepreneur
- Sophia Cooke (1814–1895), British missionary
- Sofia Corradi (1934–2025), Italian pedagogist
- Sophia Crawford, multiple people
- Sofía Cuthbert (1918–1974), Chilean terrorist victim
- Sofia Danova, Bulgarian mathematician and philanthropist
- Sophia Adriana de Bruijn (1816–1890), Dutch museum founder
- Sophia Elizabeth De Morgan (1809–1892), English spiritualist writer and activist
- Sofia de Veyra (1876–1953), Filipino feminist and educator
- Sophia Dobson Collet (1822–1894), English feminist freethinker
- Sophia Duleep Singh (1876–1948), British suffragette
- Sofia Dzerzhinskaya (1882–1968), Polish communist
- Sophia Eberlein (1889–1931), American murder victim
- Sofia Maria Ekwall (1826–1897), Swedish murderer
- Sofia Ferreira (1922–2010), Portuguese communist and prisoner
- Sophia Foord, American teacher and abolitionist
- Sophia Foster Richardson, American mathematician
- Sophia Frangou, Greek psychiatrist
- Sophia Fry (1837–1897), British political activist
- Sophia Fowler Gallaudet (1798–1877), American deaf educator
- Sofia Gatica (born 1967), Argentine environmentalist
- Sophia George, American video game designer
- Sofia Gerhardt, Russian businessperson
- Sofía González, multiple people
- Sofia Gennadievna Gorschkova (1889–1972), Soviet botanist
- Sophia Goudstikker (1865–1924), Dutch photographer
- Sophia Goulden (1833–1910), Manx woman
- Sophia Grojsman (born 1945), Belarus-born American perfumer
- Sofia Gruskin, American health and human rights advocate
- Sofia Gumaelius (1840–1915), Swedish businessperson
- Sofia Gurevitsh, Belarusian Jewish educator
- Sofia Hagman, multiple people
- Sofia Halechko (1891–1918), Austrian-Hungarian soldier
- Sophia Bracy Harris, American child care advocate
- Sophia Hayden (1868–1953), American architect
- Sofía Heinonen, Argentine conservationist
- Sofía Hernández Salazar (born 1998), Costa Rican human rights and environmental activist
- Sophia Hillan, Northern Irish writer, critic and academic
- Sofia Hjärne (1780–1860), Finnish baroness, writer and salon holder
- Sophia Curtiss Hoffman (1825–1905), American philanthropist
- Sophia Holmes (c. 1825–1900), American civil servant
- Sofia Holmgren, Swedish physician
- Sophia Hume, American author and preacher
- Sofía Ímber (1924–2017), Venezuelan journalist and political activist
- Sofia Ionescu (1920–2008), Romanian neurosurgeon
- Sophia Jansson, Finnish businessperson, daughter of Lars Jansson and niece of Tove Jansson
- Sophia Jex-Blake (1840–1912), English physician, teacher, and feminist
- Sophia Orne Johnson (1826–1899), American journalist and non-fiction author
- Sophia B. Jones (1857–1932), American physician and educator
- Sophia Johnston, Scottish carpenter and blacksmith
- Sofia Karim, British artist, human rights activist and architect
- Sofia Karlsson, multiple people
- Sofia Kawawa (1936–1994), Tanzanian activist
- Sophia Kianni (born 2001), Iranian American social entrepreneur and climate change activist
- Sophia Kleegman (1901–1971), Russian American obstetrician, gynecologist and sex education advocate
- Sofya Kovalevskaya (1850–1891), Russian mathematician
- Sophia Z. Lee, American legal historian and academic administrator
- Sophia Louise Little, American poet and abolitionist
- Sophia Monté Neuberger Loebinger (1865–1943), Jewish-American singer, philanthropist, women's suffrage activist, orator, writer, and newspaper editor
- Sophia Lonsdale (1854–1936), British anti-suffragist
- Sophia Lösche, German murder victim
- Sophia Metz, French entrepreneur
- Sofia Miliband (1922–2017), Russian Orientalist and Iranist
- Sofía Montenegro (born 1954), Nicaraguan journalist, social researcher and feminist
- Sophia Moreau, American philosopher
- Sophia Morrison (1859–1917), Manx activist and writer
- Sophia Mustafa, Indian-born teacher and politician
- Sofia Nădejde (1856–1946), Romanian novelist, playwright, translator, journalist, women's rights activist and socialist
- Sophia Namutebi (born 1979), Ugandan businesswoman, traditional healer and community leader
- Sofia Neuparth, Portuguese dancer, choreographer, researcher and educator
- Sofia Nilsson, multiple people
- Sofia Noti (1925–1944), Albanian partisan
- Sofia Okunevska (1865–1926), Ukrainian physician, educator, feminist and scholar
- Sofia Olhede, British-Swedish mathematical statistician
- Sofia Ongele (born 2000), American software developer and hacktivist
- Sophia French Palmer (1853–1920), American nurse, editor and health administrator
- Sophia Pang, Singaporean adventurer
- Sofia Panina (1871–1956), Russian countess and politician
- Sophia Elizabeth Peeters (1833–1916), Dutch ethnologist who published Wase folklore
- Sofia Pereira, multiple people
- Sophia Perovskaya (1853–1881), Russian revolutionary
- Sofía Petro (born 2002), Colombian activist and feminist
- Sofya Poghosyan (born 1988), Armenian broadcaster, psychologist and actress
- Sofia Pomba Guerra (1906–1976), Portuguese feminist and opponent
- Sophia Lane Poole, English orientalist
- Sofia Quintino, Portuguese physician
- Sophia Rabe-Hesketh, American statistician
- Sofia Richie (born 1998), American fashion model, daughter of Lionel Richie
- Sophia Ripley, American transcendentalist community founder
- Sophia Rosenfeld, American historian
- Sophia Rosoff (1924–2017), American pianist and educator
- Sofia Rusova (1856–1940), Ukrainian educator, writer, women's rights advocate and political activist
- Sofía Sánchez, multiple people
- Sofia Sapega (born 1998), Russian student and political prisoner
- Sophia Sawyer (1792–1854), American educator
- Sophia Schliemann (1852–1932), wife of Heinrich Schliemann
- Sophia Seekings Friel (1873–1954), English doctor and activist
- Sofia Smidovich (1872–1934), Bolshevik revolutionary, feminist and the leader of the Zhenotdel
- Sophia Smith (disambiguation), multiple people
- Sofia Sokolovskaya (1894–1938), Russian revolutionary, politician and senior official of the Soviet film industry
- Sofia Spångberg (1898–1992), Swedish peace activist
- Sofía Sprechmann Sineiro, Uruguayan humanitarian
- Sophia Stacey (c. 1791–1874), British businessman
- Sofia Stanley (1873–1953), British woman police officer
- Sophia D. Stoddard (1820–1891), American educator
- Sophia Sturge (1849–1936), British peace campaigner
- Sophia Sturge (abolitionist) (1795–1845), British slavery abolitionist
- Sofya Subbotina (1830–1919), Russian revolutionary
- Sophia Swire, British businessperson
- Sophia Taylor (1847–1930), New Zealand suffragist
- Sophia Susannah Taylor, translator of theological books
- Sofia Ivanovna Tyutcheva (1870–1957), granddaughter of Fyodor Tyutchev, maid of honour, and teacher of the daughters of Nikolai II of Russia
- Sofía Villa de Buentello (1892–1958), Mexican feminist
- Sofia Voutsaki, Greek archaeologist
- Sophia Wadia (c. 1901–1986), Colombian-born Indian theosophist
- Sophia Webster (born 1985), British shoe and accessories designer
- Sophia Wellbeloved, Irish historian, artist, and teacher
- Sophia Wilkens (1817–1889), Swedish educator
- Sophia Williams-De Bruyn, South African anti-apartheid activist
- Sophia Wells Royce Williams, American philanthropist
- Sophia Wintz (c. 1847–1929), Swiss-born British philanthropist
- Sophia Wisniewska, American academic
- Sophia Xenophontos, Greek Cypriot academic and classicist
- Sofya Yanovskaya (1896–1966), Russian mathematician
- Sophia Yilma (born 1942), Ethiopian journalist and politician
- Sophia Yin (1966–2014), American veterinarian
- Sofia Zhukova (1939–2020), Russian serial killer
- Sophia Zoungas, Australian endocrinologist

== Fictional characters ==
- Sofia Constantinas, from the comic Wonder Woman
- Sofia Curtis, from the TV series CSI: Crime Scene Investigation
- Sofia Dupre, on the American soap opera The Young and the Restless
- Sophia Forrester, from the animated TV series Last Exile
- Sophia Hapgood, from the video game Indiana Jones and the Fate of Atlantis
- Sophia Lopez, from the TV series Nip/Tuck
- Sophia Peletier, from the TV series and comic books The Walking Dead
- Sophia Petrillo, from the TV series The Golden Girls
- Sofia Petrovna, from the novel of the same name

== See also ==
- Sophie (disambiguation)
- Sofie, a given name and surname
- Sonia (name)
- SOFIA
