= Sofie =

Sofie is a feminine given name and a surname. Notable bearers of the name include:

== Given name ==
- Sofie Albinus (born 1972), Danish tennis player
- Sofie Bernhoft (1870–1966), Norwegian actress
- Sofie Börjesson (born 1997), Swedish handballer
- Sofie Bredgaard (born 2002), Danish footballer
- Sofie de Bretteville (born 2001), Danish politician
- Sofie Castenschiold (1882–1979), Danish tennis player
- Sofie Holmboe Dahl (born 1996), Danish badminton player
- Sofie Dokter (born 2002), Dutch pentathlete and heptathlete
- Sofie Dossi (born 2001), American contortionist, aerialist, YouTuber, dancer and singer
- Sofie Eriksson (born 1992), Swedish politician
- Sofie Flader (born 1996), Danish handball player
- Sofie Formica (born 1971), Australian radio and television presenter and actress
- Sofie Goffin (born 1979), Belgian freestyle swimmer
- Sofie Gråbøl (born 1968), Danish actress
- Sofie Hagen (born 1988), Danish comedian, author, podcaster, fashion designer and fat acceptance campaigner
- Sofie Karoline Haugen (born 1995), Norwegian speed skater
- Sofie Hendrickx (born 1986), Belgian basketball player
- Sofie Herzog (1846–1925), early Texas physician
- Sofie Johannesdotter (1839–1876), Swedish-Norwegian serial killer
- Sofie Johansson (born 1985), Swedish orienteering competitor
- Sofie Heby Pedersen (born 2001), Danish mountain biker
- Sofie Junge Pedersen (born 1992), Danish footballer
- Sofie Bloch Jørgensen (born 1991), Danish footballer
- Sofie Karsberg (born 1997), Danish footballer
- Sofie Kirk Kristiansen (born 1976), Danish fourth-generation part-owner of The Lego Group
- Sofie Krehl (born 1995), German cross-country skier
- Sofie Laguna, 21st century Australian writer
- Sofie Linde (born 1989), Danish television presenter
- Sofie Lippert (born 1995), Danish politician
- Sofie Lundgaard (born 2002), Danish footballer
- Sofie Berzon MacKie (born 1984), Israeli visual artist, curator and art gallery director
- Sofie Madsen (1897–1982), Danish teacher and school principal known for her pioneering work with autistic children
- Sofie Marhaug (born 1990), Norwegian politician
- Sofie Marmont (born 1965), Swedish curler
- Sofie Merckx (born 1974), Belgian physician and politician
- Sofie Carsten Nielsen (born 1975), Danish politician
- Sofie Olsen (born 1995), Danish handball player
- Sofie Oyen (born 1992), Belgian tennis player
- Sofie Parelius (1823–1902), Norwegian stage actress
- Sofie Petersen (born 1955), Greenlandic Lutheran bishop
- Sofie Podlipská ((1833 –1897), Czech writer
- Sofie Louise Johansson Petra (born 1986), Swedish member of the Kelantan royal family by marriage
- Sofie Sarenbrant (born 1978), Swedish writer
- Sofie Skoog (born 1990), Swedish high jumper
- Sofie Svava (born 2000), Danish footballer
- Sofie van den Enk (born 1980), Dutch television presenter
- Sofie van Rooijen (born 2002), Dutch racing cyclist
- Sofie Vendelbo (born 2000), Danish footballer
- Sofie Wille (Fia Wille) (1868–1920), German designer and interior architect
- Sofie Zdebel (born 2004), German footballer

== Surname ==
- Clara Sofie (born 1981), Danish singer and songwriter born Clara Sofie Fabricius Rosenhoff
- Frederikke Sofie (born 1997), Danish fashion model

== Fictional characters ==
- the protagonist of Sofie, a 1992 Danish film
- Sofie, a main character of Carnivàle, an American television series
- Sofie Fatale, in the film Kill Bill: Volume 1

== See also ==
- Sophie
- Sophia
