= AIMS Meeting =

European annual biomedical conference

Annual International (bio)Medical Students Meeting (AIMS Meeting)
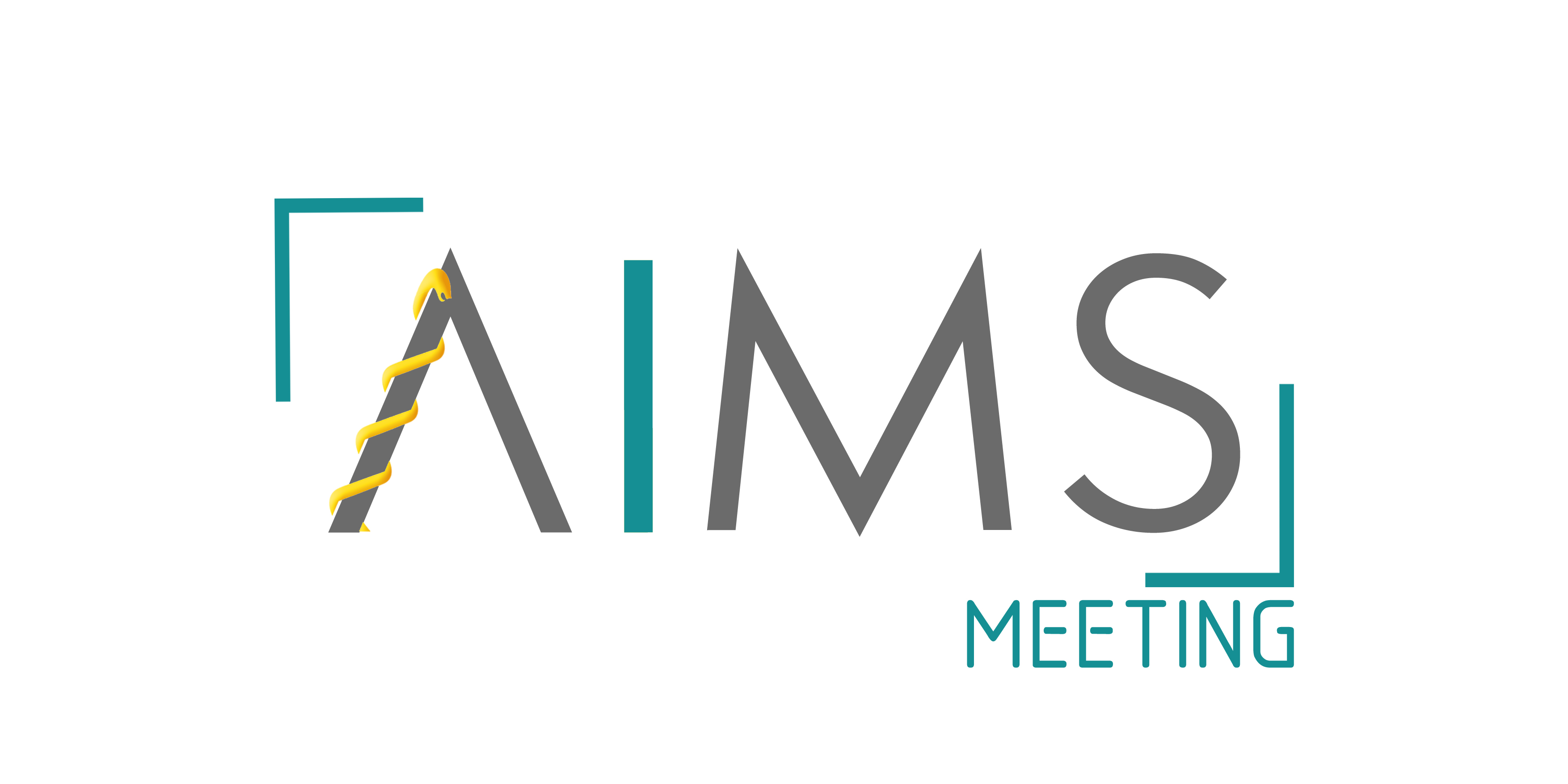
- Genre: Biomedical sciences
- Dates: 16–19 April 2026
- Venue: Aula Magna, University of Lisbon
- Location: Lisbon
- Country: Portugal
- Inaugurated: 2009
- Most recent: AIMS Meeting 2025
- Attendance: 1346 (AIMS Meeting 2021)
- Leader: Beatriz Coelho and Pedro Gaiolas
- Organizer: AEFML – Lisbon Faculty of Medicine
- Filing status: Nonprofit organization
- Website: aimsmeeting.org

The Annual International (bio)Medical Students Meeting, also known as AIMS Meeting, is an annual student congress on biomedical sciences. It is the largest European biomedical conference organised by medical students.

== History ==
Founded in 2009, AIMS Meeting was first recognized by ENJOY Med and was attended primarily by medical students. By its 3rd edition, the congress had expanded internationally and was now meant for all students attending biomedical sciences courses.

== Location ==
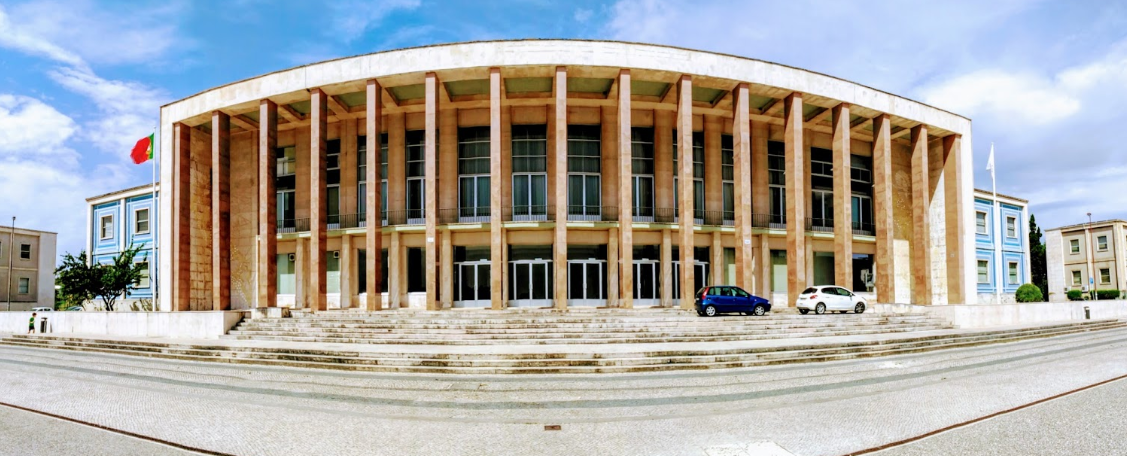
Rectorate

AIMS Meeting takes place at the Aula Magna of the University of Lisbon (UL) in Portugal. The congress' workshops are also held at other places, such at the Hospital de Santa Maria, and the Instituto de Medicina Molecular, an associated research centre.

== Congress structure ==
Each of its 4 days of lectures i s dedicated to a module, with every lecture being dedicated to a specific concept. As the congress is for (bio)medical students who are interested in research. The congress also offers practical learning opportunities through its workshops.

== Organising committee ==
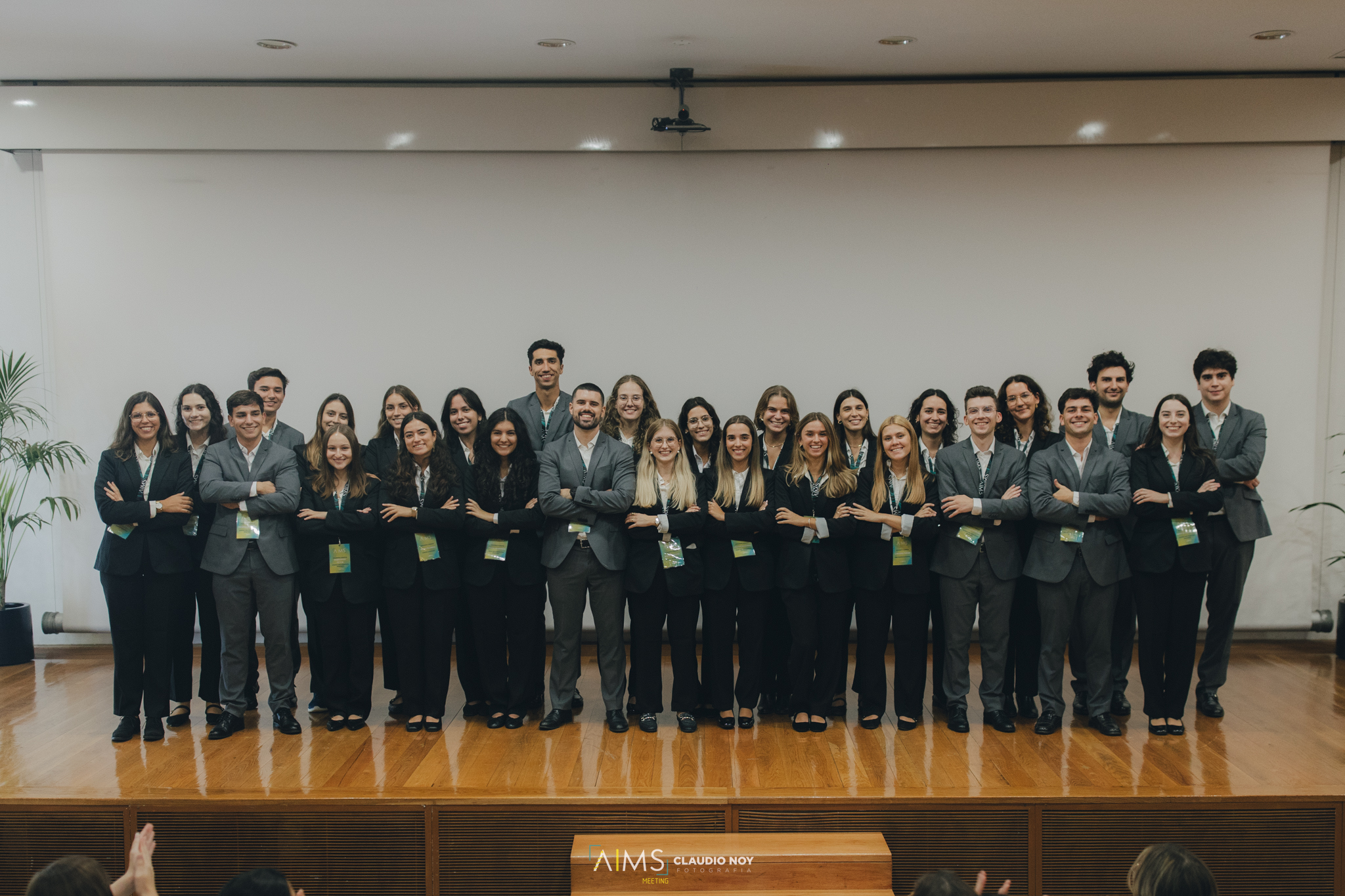
AIMS Meeting 2026 Organising Committee

Its structure consists of four departments: Scientific Department, Logistics and Fundraising Department, Image and Communication Department, and Public Relations Department. Each department has its own coordinators, with the Organising Committee being led by two General Coordinators.

== Prizes and awards ==
The European Medical Students' Association (EMSA) distinguished the 10th AIMS Meeting as "The Most Innovative Project" at the Autumn Assembly 2019, held in Athens, Greece from September 1 to September 6, under the theme "A medical Curriculum shaped by Medical Students".
