= Sofija =

Sofija may refer to:

- Sofija, Bulgaria, a variant spelling of the country's capital city
- Sofija (given name), feminine name
