= Sophie Amalie =

Sophie Amalie may refer to:

- Sophie Amalie of Brunswick-Calenberg (1628–1685), Queen of Denmark and Norway
- Sophie Amalie Lindenov (1649–1688), Danish noblewoman and landowner
- Sophie Amalie Moth (1654–1719), Danish noblewoman
- Sophie Amalie of Nassau-Siegen (1650–1688), German noblewoman
- Sophie Amalie of Ahlefeldt-Langeland (1675–1741), Danish noblewoman
- Sophie Amalie of Zweibrücken (1646–1695), Palatine noblewoman

== See also ==
- Sophie (disambiguation)
- Amalie
