= Sofiya =

Sofiya may refer to:

- Sofiya, Bulgaria, a variant spelling of the country's capital city
- Sofiya (given name), feminine name
