= Sonia (name) =

- Pronunciation: /ˈsɒniə/ SON-ee-ə
- Gender: Feminine

Origin
- Meaning: Wisdom

Other names
- Related names: Sophia

Sonia is a feminine given name in many areas of the world including the West, Russia, Iran, and South Asia. Sonia and its variant spellings Sonja and Sonya are used in many countries, including Russia, as a diminutive for Sofiya (Greek Sophia "Wisdom").

The name was popularised in the English-speaking world by characters in the novels Crime and Punishment by Fyodor Dostoyevsky (1866, English translation 1885) and War and Peace by Leo Tolstoy (1869, English translation 1886), and later by a 1917 bestselling novel, Sonia: Between Two Worlds, by Stephen McKenna.

Scandinavian countries spell the name with the letter j: Sonja, while many English speaking countries spell it with i or y: Sonia or Sonya.

Although the most common English pronunciation is /ˈsɒniə/, /ˈsoʊniə/ and /ˈsoʊnjə/ are also possible.

== Notable people ==
- Queen Sonja of Norway (born 1937)
- Sonia, alias of Omaira Rojas Cabrera (born 1967), FARC-EP guerrilla member
- Sonya, cover name of the Soviet spy Ursula Kuczynski (1907–2000)
- Sonja Albrink (1948–2012), Danish politician
- Sonja Bakić (born 1984), Serbian pop/rock singer
- Sonia Balassanian (born 1942), Iranian-born Armenian painter, sculptor, and curator
- Sonja Barend (1940–2026), Dutch television personality and talk show host
- Sonja Barjaktarović (born 1986), Montenegrin handball goalkeeper
- Sonia Ben Ammar (born 1999), French-Tunisian model
- Sonia Bermúdez Robles (born c. 1955), Colombian thanatologist
- Sonja Berndt, American pharmacologist and cancer epidemiologist
- Sônia Braga (born 1950), Brazilian actress
- Sonia Caron, Quebec politician
- Sonia Chase (born 1976), American basketball player and philanthropist
- Sonia Cheng, Hong Kong business executive
- Sonja Christopher, American Survivor contestant
- Sonia Citron (born 2003), American basketball player
- Sonia Couling (born 1974), Thai model, actress and TV personality
- Sonia Darrin (1924–2020), American film actress
- Sonia Disa (born 1944), Sri Lankan Sinhala cinema actress
- Sonya Eddy (1958–2022), American actress
- Sonia Evans (born 1971), English pop singer
- Sonia Fergina Citra (born 1993), Indonesian beauty pageant titleholder who won Puteri Indonesia 2018
- Sonja Fransson (born 1949), Swedish politician
- Sonia Gandhi (born 1946), Indian politician, president of the Indian National Congress 1998–2017 and 2019–2022
- Sonya Googins (born 1936), American politician
- Sonya Haddad (1936–2004), American translator and surtitler
- Sonja Hanneborg (née Dedichen) (1902–1998), Norwegian scientist, student of Ellen Gleditsch and Marie Curie
- Sonya Hartnett (born 1968), Australian writer
- Sonja Henie (1912–1969), Norwegian figure skater and actress
- Sonja Hilmer (born 1999), American figure skater
- Sonia Holleyman, British creator, author and illustrator of Mona the Vampire
- Sonia E. Howe (1871–19??), Russian essayist
- Sonia de Ignacio (born 1971), Spanish field hockey player
- Sonia Ilinskagia (1938–2024), Greek-Russian writer, translator and professor
- Sonya Isaacs (born 1974), American country/Christian music singer-songwriter
- Sonya Jeyaseelan, Canadian tennis player
- Sonia Kacem (born 1985), Swiss visual artist
- Sonja Kokkonen (born 1996), Finnish rhythmic gymnast
- Sonja Koppitz (born 1981), German radio presenter
- Sonya Koshkina (born 1985), Ukrainian journalist, editor-in-chief
- Sonja Kovač (born 1984), Croatian actress and model
- Sonja Kristina (born Sonia Christina Shaw), English singer, vocalist for Curved Air
- Sonija Kwok (born 1974), Hong Kong actress
- Sonja Lang, Canadian linguist who constructed the language Toki Pona
- Sonia Lo (born 1992), Hong Kong windsurfer
- Sonia Manzano, American actress
- Sonia Mazey (born 1958), New Zealand political science academic
- Sonja McCullen, American judge
- Sonja Morgan, American television personality, The Real Housewives of New York City
- Sonia McMahon (1932–2010), Australian socialite, widow of William McMahon
- Sónia Ndoniema (born 1985), Angolan basketball player.
- Sonia Singh (born 1964), Indian television actress
- Sonia O'Sullivan (born 1969), Irish athlete
- Sonia Opoku, Ghanaian footballer
- Sonia Peres (1923–2011), wife of Israel's Prime Minister and President Shimon Peres
- Sonia Purnell, British writer and journalist
- Sonia Raman (born 1974), American basketball coach
- Sonja A. Rasmussen, American pediatrician, medical geneticist, and epidemiologist
- Sonia Rutstein, American musician of the band Disappear Fear
- Sonia Rykiel (1930–2016), French designer
- Sonja Savić (1961–2008), Serbian actress
- Sonya Scarlet (born 1980), singer of Italian band Theatres des Vampires
- Sonja Smets, Belgian and Dutch logician
- Sonia Sotomayor (born 1954), Associate Justice of the Supreme Court of the United States
- Sonia Steinsapir (1912–1980), Russian-born artist, archivist
- Sonja Tate (born 1971), American basketball player
- Sonia Taverner (1936–2018), English-born Canadian ballet dancer
- Sonya Tayeh, American dancer and choreographer
- Sonya Tayurskaya (born 1991), Russian singer, member of Little Big
- Sonia Theodoridou (born 1958), Greek soprano singer
- Sonja Vasić (née Petrović; born 1989), Serbian basketball player
- Sonya Walger (born 1974), English actress best known as Lost's Penny Widmore
- Zonja Wallen-Lawrence (1892–1986), Swedish-American biochemist, nutritionist
- Sonia Ziadé, Canadian politician from Quebec
- Sonja Zhenikhova (born 2008), German tennis player

== Fictional characters ==
- Red Sonja, archetypal fierce and beautiful barbarian
- Sonja in the Underworld series of vampire films
- Sonya Blade in the Mortal Kombat series of video games
- Sonia Fowler in British soap opera EastEnders
- Sonya Herfmann, also known as Chanel #2, in the television series Scream Queens
- Sonya Rebecchi in the Australian soap opera Neighbours
- Sonya Rostova, character in War and Peace by Leo Tolstoy and the musical based on it, Natasha, Pierre & The Great Comet of 1812
- Sonya Simonson, an adaptation of Beautiful Dreamer in The Gifted
- Sonia Strumm, rock star in the Mega Man Star Force series of video games

== Pen name ==
- Sonia, pen name of the Italian journalist Ottavia Vitagliano
