= Sofija (given name) =

Female given name

- Gender: female
- Language: Croatian, Latvian, Lithuanian, Macedonian, Serbian, Slovene

Origin
- Meaning: Wisdom
- Region of origin: Croatia, Latvia, Lithuania, North Macedonia, Serbia, Slovenia

Other names
- Alternative spelling: Cyrillic: Софија
- Nickname: Serbian: Sofi (Софи)
- Related names: Serbian: Sofijana (Софијана)
- See also: Sophia

Sofija (Cyrillic: Софија) is feminine given name found in South Slavic and East Baltic languages.

It is a cognate of the Greek name Sophia meaning 'Wisdom'.

Notable people bearing the name Sofija include:

- Sofija Bilevičiūtė-Zubovienė (1860–1932), Polish-Lithuanian noblewoman
- Sofija Garanča (born 2004), Latvian footballer
- Sofija Gergeležiu (born 2003), Latvian footballer
- Sofija Grandakovska, Macedonian writer
- Sofija Jakimovič (1940–2006), Kildin Sámi poet and author
- Sofija Jovanović (1895–1979), Serbian war hero
- Sofija Korkutytė (1939–2000), Lithuanian rower
- Sofija Krajšumović (born 2002), Bosnian footballer
- Sofija Kymantaitė-Čiurlionienė (1886–1958), Lithuanian writer, educator and activist
- Sofija Milošević (born 1991), Serbian model
- Sofija Naletilić (1913–1994), Croatian naïve sculptor from Herzegovina
- Sofija Ņesterova (born 2001), Latvian footballer
- Sofija Novoselić (born 1990), Croatian alpine skier
- Sofija Pekić (born 1953), Yugoslav basketball player
- Sofija Pšibiliauskienė (1867–1926), Lithuanian writer
- Sofija Skoric (1937–2022), Serbian-Canadian writer, editor, translator, publisher and activist
- Sofija Smetonienė (1885–1968), former First Lady of Lithuania
- Sofija Tepes (born 1973), Chilean table tennis player
- Sofija Veiverytė (1926–2009), Lithuanian painter

== See also ==
- Sofiya (given name)
