= Sofia Nilsson =

Sofia Nilsson is a Swedish name that may refer to:

- Sofia Spångberg (born Nilsson, 1899–1992), Swedish peace activist
- Sofia Nilsson (footballer) (born 1990), Swedish football midfielder
- Sofia Nilsson (politician) (born 1982), Swedish politician
