= Sophy =

- Gender: Female
- Language: English, French, German, Dutch

Origin
- Derivation: Sophia
- Meaning: Wise

Other names
- Alternative spelling: Sophie
- Nickname: Soph

Sophy is an alternate spelling of the female given name Sophie, from the name Sophia, meaning 'wise'.

== People with the name ==
- Sophy A. Christensen (1867–1955), Danish master carpenter and furniture designer
- Sophy Gray (1814–1871), English diocesan administrator, artist, architect, and horsewoman
- Sophy Mae Mitchell, one of the first women to play in the University of Florida Fightin' Gator Marching Band
- Sophy Parfin (1918–1966), American entomologist
- Sophy Regensburg (1885–1974), American painter
- Sophy Rickett (born 1970), British visual artist
- Sophy Ridge (born 1984), English broadcast journalist and host of Sophy Ridge on Sunday
- Sophy Romvari (born 1990), Canadian film director, writer, and actress
- Sophy Sanger (1881–1950), British internationalist and labour law reformer
- Sophy Wong (born 1992), Hong Kong singer-songwriter also known as SOPHY
- Sophy (singer), Puerto Rican singer

== Fictional characters ==
- Great-Aunt Sophy, a character in the children's fantasy novel The Borrowers by Mary Norton and in the film adaptation
- Sophy Stanton-Lacy, the titular character of The Grand Sophy by Georgette Heyer
- Sophy, a young girl in the book, The Camomile Lawn, and the adaptation, The Camomile Lawn (TV serial)
- Sophy, the twin protagonist of the second part of Darkness Visible (novel)
- Sophy, a character played by Betty Kean in the 1978 film The Fifth Floor
- Sophy, a character played by Gloria Hope in the lost film The Outcasts of Poker Flat
- Sophy of Kravonia, the protagonist of the novel Sophy of Kravonia by Anthony Hope later adapted into the film Sophy of Kravonia or, The Virgin of Paris starring Diana Karenne in the role
- Sophy Bunker, a French adventuress in Steele MacKaye's 1877 play Won at Last
- Sophy Carson, a character in Mary Barton (TV series) played by Linda Marlowe
- Sophy Crewler, fiancee Tommy Traddles in David Copperfield
- Sophy Cassmajor, the protagonist of Margery Sharp same-named 1934 novel
- Sophy Fairfax, a character played by Lysette Anthony in season 1, episode 8 ("The March Of Time") of Lovejoy
- Sophy Fullgarney, a manicurist in The Gay Lord Quex (play)
- Lady Sophy Horfield, character in The Paradine Case played by Ethel Barrymore
- Sophy Hojo, a character in the PriPara game and anime series voiced by Miyu Kubota
- Sophy Hutton, the vicar's eldest daughter played by Kimberley Nixon in Cranford (TV series)
- Sophy Jackson, the unmarried sister of Sillerton Jackson in Edith Wharton's 1920 novel The Age of Innocence
- Sophy Kwykwer, Marianne Faithfull's character in Ghost Story (1974 film)
- Sophy Murdock, a character in the 1918 American silent film Old Wives for New played by Sylvia Ashton and Wanda Hawley
- Sophy Ninan Varghese, a character played by Mohini in the Indian Malayalam-language film, Naadody
- Sophy Paget-Lombardi, Catherine Schell's character in Strangers episode, "A Swift and Evil Rozzer"
- Mrs Sophy Pullet (née Dodson), a character in George Eliot's The Mill on the Floss
- Sophy Sinclair, a student in Anne's class in L. M. Montgomery's Anne of Windy Poplars
- Sophy Viner, a character in Edith Wharton's 1912 novel, The Reef and played by Alicia Witt in film adaptation
- Sophy the robot, a companion to Musio the robot

== Works of fiction ==
- The Sophy, a 1641 revenge tragedy by Sir John Denham
- The Grand Sophy, a 1950 historical novel by Georgette Heyer

== See also ==
- Sophie (disambiguation)
- Charles Sophy
- Sophy (Safavid Iran)
