= Sofia Karlsson =

Sofia Karlsson may refer to:

- Sofia Karlsson (singer) (born 1975), Swedish folk singer
- Sofia Jarl (née Karlsson, born 1977), Swedish politician
- Sofia Karlsson (dancer) (born 1978), Swedish modern dancer
