= Sophie (disambiguation) =

Sophie is a feminine given name also spelled Sophy.

Sophie or Sophy may also refer to:

== Arts and entertainment ==
- Sophie (musician) (1986–2021), English record producer, singer, songwriter, and DJ
  - Sophie (album), by Sophie, 2024
- Sophie, album by BulletBoys, 2003
- "Sophie" (song), by Goodshirt, 2002
- Sophie (book series), six children's books by Dick King-Smith and David Parkins
- Sophie (TV series), a Canadian sitcom
- Sophie: A Murder in West Cork, a 2021 TV documentary about the death of Sophie Toscan du Plantier
- "Sophie," a 2025 episode of The Bear TV series

== Ships ==
- HMS Sophie, several British warships
- SMS Sophie, 1881 member of the Carola class of steam corvettes

== Other uses ==
- Sophie (digital library), a digital library of works by German-speaking women
- Sophie, Haiti, a village in the Ouest department of Haiti
- SOPHIE échelle spectrograph, a French astronomical instrument
- Sophie Prize, an international environment and development prize
- Sophie the Giraffe, a teething toy for babies
- Sophy (Safavid Iran), a term for the ruler of the Safavid dynasty of Iran

== See also ==
- Sophia (given name)
- Miss Sophie (disambiguation)
- Sophie's Choice (novel), a 1979 novel by William Styron
  - Sophie's Choice (film), a 1982 film adapted from the novel
- Sophie's World, a 1991 novel by Jostein Gaarder
