= Sofia Mensurado =

Portuguese scientist

- Born: 1992 (age 33–34)
- Education: Faculty of Sciences of the University of Lisbon
- Occupation: Scientist
- Employer: Instituto de Medicina Molecular

Sofia Mensurado (1992) is a Portuguese scientist whose research focuses on molecular processes in breast cancer immunotherapy. Her team won the Janssen prize in 2018.

== Biography ==
Sofia Mensurado Silva graduated in medical sciences from the University of Lisbon and did her master's degree in biochemistry at the Faculty of Sciences of the University of Lisbon, developing her thesis at the iMM (João Lobo Antunes Institute of Molecular Medicine). She did her PhD in Bruno Silva-Santos' laboratory at the same institute. Since 2020, she has been a postdoctoral researcher at the iMM.

Her research studies the role of T lymphocytes in the immune response to cancer, specifically the neutralization of gamma-delta T cells, which help tumor proliferation. Sofia Mensurado studies the efficacy of methionine (an amino acid, a component of proteins, present in our diet) in boosting immunotherapy as a treatment for breast cancer.

== Awards ==
Her doctoral project, entitled "Regulation of T cell fitness and function in the tumour microenvironment", was funded with a doctoral scholarship from the FCT (Foundation for Science and Technology) in 2015. In April 2016, she received an award from the Portuguese Society of Immunology for a trip abroad.

In 2018, together with Bruno Silva-Santos and Karine Serre, he won the 2nd edition of the Janssen Innovation prize, worth €30,000, for the research "Tumor-associated neutrophils suppress pro-tumoral IL-17+ γδ T cells through induction of oxidative stress". This study was also supported by the iMM-Laço Fund, awarded by Associação Laço in partnership with iMM (Instituto de Medicina Molecular – João Lobo Antunes).

== Works ==
She has co-authored several scientific articles:

- 2019 – γδ T cells: pleiotropic immune effectors with therapeutic potential in cancer, Nature Reviews Cancer
- 2019 – γδ-T cells promote IFN-γ–dependent Plasmodium pathogenesis upon liver-stage infection, PNAS
- 2018 – Tumor-associated neutrophils suppress pro-tumoral IL-17+ γδ T cells through induction of oxidative stress, PLOS Biology
- 2017 – IL‐23 drives differentiation of peripheral γδ17 T cells from adult bone marrow‐derived precursors, EMBO Reports
- 2014 – Murine CD27((-)) V gamma 6((+)) gamma delta T cells producing IL-17A promote ovarian cancer growth via mobilization of protumor small peritoneal macrophages, PNAS
