= Sonja Koppitz =

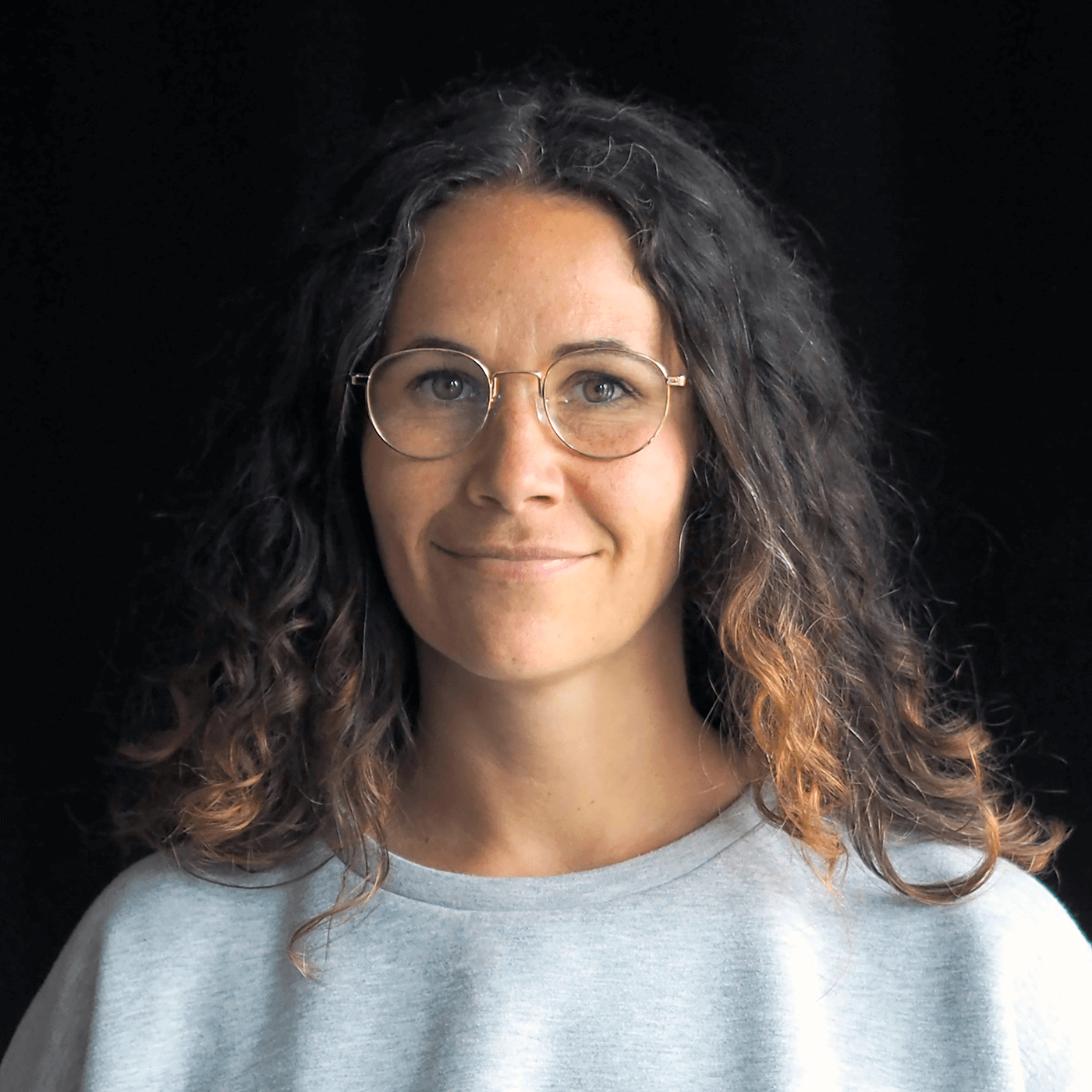
- Sonja Koppitz
- Born: October 18, 1981; Berlin
- Occupations: Radio presenter podcaster

Sonja Koppitz (born 18 October 1981 in West Berlin) is a German radio presenter and podcaster.

== Life and career ==
Sonja Koppitz grew up in the Gropiusstadt district of Berlin. After graduating from high school, she completed internships and a traineeship at 98.8 KISS FM Berlin. She worked at Südwestrundfunk, where she hosted the morning show for the youth radio station Dasding. Later, she worked as a radio presenter for Fritz from 2006 and for Bremen Vier from 2014. From May 2016 until the end of 2021, she regularly co-hosted the afternoon programme Radioeins ab drei ("Radioeins from three") on Radioeins with Max Spallek. They also hosted the Friday afternoon show Die schöne Woche ("The happy week") a few times. The duo hosted the seven-hour broadcast of Radioeins on the New Year's Eve in 2020/21 and 2021/22, presenting the programmes Da ist die Tür – Die Radioeins Silvestershow ("There is the door – The Radioeins New Year's Eve show") and Frohes Neues – Die Radioeins Silvestershow ("Happy New Year – The Radioeins New Year's Eve show"), including a livestream on the Radioeins YouTube channel.

Since 2013, Koppitz has co-commentated along with Jörg Thadeusz during the live broadcast of the Christopher Street Day on the rbb internet stream.

Koppitz hosts the weekend podcast Plus Eins for Deutschlandfunk Kultur. Together with Sara Steinert, she runs the podcast Kopfsalat ("Head salad"), which focuses on the theme of depression. After the first episode aired in 2019, Peter Weissenburger wrote in Die Tageszeitung that the podcast appeared "a little overloaded and overproduced", but was nevertheless convincing due to good preparation and research. For the five-part report podcast Spinnst du? ("Are you spinning") by Radioeins, she reported for a week from the psychiatric ward of the Benjamin Franklin University Hospital.

In the podcast STRAIGHT Talking, co-produced with Felicia Mutterer, Koppitz discusses topics related to queer life with her co-host and other guests. The podcast, launched in 2017, was among the first podcasts to discuss fem-queer topics. It followed the 24-part Audible series STRAIGHT für alle, die Frauen lieben ("STRAIGHT for anyone who loves women"). Since autumn 2020, Koppitz has kept a personal Corona diary about the COVID-19 pandemic, which she publishes occasionally via IGTV on her Instagram channel. In December 2021, she released her first book Spinnst du? ("Are you spinning?"), in which she addresses depression and the stigma surrounding it.

== Personal life ==
Koppitz lives in Berlin-Steglitz. She was married to journalist Britta Nothnagel.
