= Sofia Wännerdahl =

Swedish footballer

Personal information
- Date of birth: 3 December 1995 (age 30)
- Place of birth: Sweden
- Position: Defender

Youth career
- Borgeby FK

Senior career*
Years	Team	Apps	(Gls)
2014–2020	IF Limhamn Bunkeflo	120	(6)
2020–2023	Piteå IF	56	(1)
2023–2024	Malmö FF	0	(0)

International career
2011–2012	Sweden U17	5	(0)
- * Club domestic league appearances and goals as of 11 September 2023

Sofia Wännerdahl (born 3 December 1995) is a Swedish women's football defender.

== Club career ==
Sofia Wännerdahl played at Borgeby FK in her youth years. In 2014, she joined IF Limhamn Bunkeflo.
