= Sofía Sánchez =

Sofía Sánchez may refer to:

- Sofía Sánchez (synchronized swimmer)
- Sofía Sánchez (politician)
- Sofía Sanchez (actress)
