= Sofia Nilsson (footballer) =

Swedish footballer

Personal information
- Date of birth: 12 June 1990 (age 36)
- Position: Midfielder

Team information
- Current team: Djurgårdens IF
- Number: 16

Youth career
- Strövelstorp GoIF

Senior career*
| Years | Team | Apps | (Gls) |
| 2009 | Stattena | 21 | (0) |
| 2011– | Djurgården | 106 | (6) |
- * Club domestic league appearances and goals as of 7 September 2016

Sofia Nilsson (born 12 June 1990) is a Swedish football midfielder who currently plays for Djurgårdens IF. She has played Damallsvenskan football for Stattena IF and Djurgårdens IF.
