= Sofie Karsberg =

Danish footballer

Personal information
- Full name: Sofie Karsberg-Petersen
- Date of birth: 3 September 1997 (age 29)
- Place of birth: Slagelse, Denmark
- Height: 1.65 m (5 ft 5 in)
- Position: Right-back

Youth career
- 2013–2014: OB

Senior career*
Years	Team	Apps	(Gls)
2014–2017	OB		
2017–2020	Fortuna Hjørring	13	(1)
2020–2025	Kolding IF		

International career^{‡}
2013	Denmark U17	5	(0)
2014–2016	Denmark U19	15	(0)
2016	Denmark U23	1	(0)
- * Club domestic league appearances and goals ‡ National team caps and goals as of 14:50, 3 September 2026 (UTC)

Sofie Karsberg (born 3 September 1997) is a Danish footballer who plays as a right-back and is currently a free agent. She most recently played for A-Liga club Kolding IF. Karsberg represented Denmark at youth level.

== Club career ==
Karsberg played a year of youth football with OB before starting her senior career with the A-Liga club in 2014. Karsberg played at the club for four years total through high school, and went on to sign with Fortuna Hjørring in 2017. Following three years and 13 appearances for Fortuna, Karsberg signed with Kolding IF in 2020.

== International career ==
Karsberg has represented Denmark at youth level.
