= Sofie Bloch Jørgensen =

Danish footballer

Personal information
- Full name: Sofie Bloch Jørgensen
- Date of birth: 23 August 1991 (age 35)
- Place of birth: Oksbøl, Denmark
- Height: 1.69 m (5 ft 7 in)
- Position: Forward

Youth career
- 1995–2004: Oksbøl
- 2004–2010: Varde IF

College career
| Years | Team | Apps | (Gls) |
| 2010–2013 | Lindsey Wilson College | | |

Senior career*
| Years | Team | Apps | (Gls) |
| 2013 | Vejlby IK | | |
| 2013–2016 | IK Skovbakken | | |
| 2016–2017 | Brøndby IF | | |
| 2017–2018 | IL Sandviken | 2 | (1) |
| 2018–2020 | VSK Aarhus | 17 | (6) |
| 2020–2022 | AGF | 40 | (13) |
| 2023 | Genoa | 14 | (3) |
| 2023 | AGF | 13 | (1) |

International career
| 2009–2010 | Denmark U19 | 12 | (4) |
- * Club domestic league appearances and goals

Sofie Bloch Jørgensen (born 23 August 1991) is a Danish former footballer who played as a forward. Bloch represented Denmark at youth level.

She played for Serie B club Genoa, AGF, VSK Aarhus, Norwegian IL Sandviken, Brøndby IF, IK Skovbakken and Vejlby IK. In addition, Bloch spent three years playing college soccer at Lindsey Wilson College in Kentucky, United States, from 2010 to 2013. When she joined Sandviken in 2017, this was her first professional contract. Prior to this, she was working as a hostess and disability assistant and studying to be a physiotherapist alongside her football career.

== Honours ==
Brøndby

- Elitedivisionen: 2016–17
- Danish Women's Cup: 2017

Sandviken

- Norwegian Women's Cup silver medalist: 2018
