= Sofia Mogilevskaya =

Russian children's writer (1903–1981)

Sofia Abramovna Mogilevskaya (Russian: Со́фья Абра́мовна Могиле́вская; 3 April 1903 – 1981) was a prolific Russian author of stories for children and young readers.

== Life and career ==
Mogilevskaya was born in Moscow on 3 April 1903 and grew up in a musical family. Her father was a cellist and music teacher, and taught her to play the piano. During her childhood, Mogilevskaya recalled his performance for Leo Tolstoy, especially when she shifted her focus to journalism and eventually literature.

Sofia devoted about fifty years of her life to children's literature, writing over fifty different works – stories, fairy tales, scientific and educational books for preschool, younger, middle and older children. Her works, popular during the life of the author, continue to be published and read at the present time. She died in 1981.

== Awards and tribute ==
On 3 April 2019, Google celebrated Sofia Mogilevskaya's 116th birthday with a Google Doodle.
