= Sophia Mengrosso =

- Born: Siberia, Russia
- Occupations: Singer; songwriter; model
- Years active: 2022–present
- Musical career
- Genres: Opera; Rock
- Instrument: Vocals
- Website: www.mengrossomusic.com

Sophia Mengrosso is a Russian-American singer-songwriter based in San Francisco. Originally an opera singer at an early age, she transitioned into rock music after being influenced by "Bring Me To Life". Mengrosso released her debut album Unforgiven in 2024.

== Early life ==
Mengrosso was born in Siberia, Russia. She began studying piano at the age of four and later learned harp. At age 10, she enrolled in formal vocal training.

== Career ==
In 2023, Mengrosso released several singles including “Dream,” “Under,” and “Demonizer.”

Her debut studio album, Unforgiven, was released on November 5, 2024. Addressing themes related to trauma and personal adversity, it contains thirteen tracks.

Mengrosso credits Evanescence and Metallica as influences.
