= Sofía González =

Sofía González may refer to:

- Sofía González Cortés (born 1987), Chilean educator and politician
- Sofia Gonzalez (athlete) (born 2001), Swiss Paralympic athlete
- Sofía González Racero (born 2001), Spanish volleyball player, competed in the FIVB Beach Volleyball U21 World Championships
- Sofía González (rugby) (born 1995), Argentine rugby player, competed in the Rugby sevens at the 2022 South American Games – Women's tournament
