= Sofiya (given name) =

Sofiya is feminine given name found in Slavic languages. It is also found in parts of Africa. It is a cognate of the Greek name Sophia. In Bulgarian it's a transliteration of София, while in Russian it's a transliteration of София or Со́фья, and in Ukraininan of Софія.

Notable people with the name include:

- Sofiya Alhassan (born 1974), Ghanaian-American kinesiologist
- Sofiya Andreeva (born 1998), Russian swimmer
- Sofiya Bozhanova (born 1967), Bulgarian long and triple jumper
- Sofiya Georgieva (born 1995), Bulgarian freestyle wrestler
- Sofiya Kabanova (born 1970), Uzbekistani athlete
- Sofiya Kalistratova (1907–1989), Russian lawyer
- Sofiya Lifatova (born 2003), Russian ice hockey player
- Sofiya Lisovskaia (1876–1951), Russian immunologist and urologist
- Sofiya Lyskun (born 2002), Ukrainian diver
- Sofiya Magarill (1900–1943), Soviet film actress
- Sofiya Mammadova (born 2009), Azeri rhythmic gymnast
- Sofiya Nalepinska-Boychuk (1884–1937), Polish-born Ukrainian artist
- Sofiya Nzau (born 1993), Kenyan singer and songwriter
- Sofiya Ostrovska (born 1958), Ukrainian mathematician
- Sofiya Ozerkova (1912–late 20th c.), Russian aviation engineer
- Sofiya Palkina (born 1998), Russian hammer thrower
- Sofiya Pregel (1894–1972), Russian-born poet
- Sofiya Qureshi, Indian Army officer and politician
- Sofiya Shishkina (born 1998), Russian football player
- Sofiya Tkachuk (born 1999), Ukrainian title holder
- Sofiya Usova (born 2010), Uzbek rhythmic gymnast
- Sofiya Vlasova (born 1991), Ukrainian speed-skater
- Sofiya Zenchenko (born 1997), Ukrainian weightlifter

== See also ==
- Sofija (given name)
