= Sofia Niyozova =

Tajik scientist (1919–2010)

- Born: 24 December 1919; Samarkand, Niyozova
- Died: 2010 (aged 90–91)

Sofia Niyozova (Tajik: София Ниёзова) (24 December 1919 – 2010) was a Tajikistani physician, active during the Soviet era.

== Biography ==
Born into a working-class family in Samarkand, Niyozova received her degree from the Samarkand Institute of Medicine in 1941. The following year, she took a position acting as Health Inspector for the Tajik SSR. She left this post to serve as a physician during World War II, in which capacity she remained until 1946. She spent the bulk of the war in Ukraine where she treated thousands of soldiers. In 1946 she returned to Tajikistan; two years later she became a member of the Communist Party of the Soviet Union. In 1953 she took a position as lecturer in the Department of Obstetrics and Gynecology of the Tajikistan State Medical Institute, in which capacity she remained until retiring from medicine in 1976. In the intervening years she became a Doctor of Medicine (in 1956) and an associate professor (in 1961). Niyozova received a variety of awards during her career. In 1956 she was named a Distinguished Tajik Physician; in 1969 she was named a Distinguished Tajik Teacher, and the following year was named a Distinguished Physician at the Union Level. She also received the Order of the Red Banner of Labour and the Honorary Order of the Presidium of the Supreme Soviet of Tajikistan for her work.
