= Sophia Fredskild =

Singer-songwriter and composer

- Born: Sophia Fredskilde Othman-Andersen; 5 October 1998 (age 27); Copenhagen, Denmark
- Genres: Pop; ballad; electronic
- Occupations: Singer; Songwriter; Composer
- Instruments: Vocal; Guitar; Keyboard
- Years active: 2017–present
- Website: www.sophiafredskild.com

Sophia Fredskilde Othman-Andersen (born 5 October 1998), known professionally as Sophia Fredskild is a mixed Danish-Malaysian singer-songwriter and composer, best known for her 'Intergalactic Love Story' project in the Pop genre with singles "Pluto", "Big Bang", "Interstellar" and "Dark Matter".

== Early life ==
Sophia Fredskild was born on 5 October 1998, in Copenhagen, Denmark to a Danish mother and a Malaysian father. In 2000, Fredskild and her family relocated to Kuala Lumpur, Malaysia, where she primarily grew up.

At the age of 10, Sophia knew she wanted to be a singer and later wrote her first song at age 13.

During her school years she joined the choir and took part in talent shows, later getting involved in theatre and musical productions outside of school including Bites Of Delights (Rhythm in Bronze), Seussical Jr The Musical (Enfiniti Academy) and Sinbad the Musical (KLPac).

After she completed her high school education in 2015, Fredskild pursued her singing and songwriting career full-time.

== Career ==
=== 2015–2016: Career beginnings ===
From August 2015 to July 2016, Sophia sang at bars, weddings, and private functions around Kuala Lumpur to gain confidence in her live singing, where she sang cover songs in a wide array of genres such as Pop, Jazz, R&B and Country, by artists like Amy Winehouse, Norah Jones to more current artist like Ed Sheeran, Rihanna and Adele. During this time Sophia developed her singing style and versatility in singing a wide range of musical styles.

=== 2016–2021 ===
In late 2016, Sophia started to seek opportunities to get her songs recorded professionally and she chanced upon a collaboration with Malaysian DJ, songwriter, and Producer Cuurley aka Bo Amir, with whom she co-wrote the English song "Go" released in November 2017. The song in Pop EDM's genre ended up being influential in the direction of music Sophia would be creating in from then onwards. Fredskild also released a second English single "More Than You See" in February 2018, a collaboration with Russian DJ, Songwriter and Producer Alexey Dorokhov aka Dorox.

In October 2018, she released her first solo project, a Malay song "Menanti Cinta" followed with an English version "Waiting For Love" in November 2018. In early 2019 she released English and Malay singles "Forever Mine" and "Cinta Selamanya" along with music videos uploaded to her YouTube channel which have reached over a million views each.

In October 2019 Sophia collaborated once again with another EDM artist Starlyte, a Malaysian Producer on the song "No Limit", which garnered over 1 million streams on the popular streaming service Spotify. In February 2020 she released "Head In The Clouds" another solo project produced by American Producer, Asaa. In October 2020, she released "Keep Me In Your Heart", which reached over 1 million views on YouTube.

In February 2021 she released "Shine A Light", and in May 2021 "Heartbreaks Not Gonna Break Me", a pop ballad, which was produced by Danish Producer, Gustav Boje.

On 27 August 2021, Sophia collaborated with Furo, a Caribbean-influenced DJ from Florida, US on a Moombahton Tropical-Dance Pop song called "Back To Paradise" and on 15 October 2021, Sophia released an EDM song called "Future So Bright" with Brazilian DJ Tutsss.

=== 2021–2022 ===
In November 2021, Sophia relocated to Denmark to further her music career. She released a Pop-Ballad single called 'In Another Lifetime" on 20 May 2022, which has since achieved over 1 million streams on Spotify and 1.1 million views on her YouTube channel to date.

=== 2023 ===
In February 2023, Sophia met Danish producer Jecho aka Joachim Ersgaard, where they collaborated on her first ever EP titled 'DNA' with singles 'Still Love Me The Same', 'Bad For Me' and 'DNA'. Her 'DNA' EP was selected as album of the week in the week of its release on Danish Radio P4 with radio host Andrew Jensen, 'DNA' was also played on Danish Radio P3 and Sophia was featured in Danish Music magazine GAFFA under upcoming artists to look out for.

=== 2024–present ===
Sophia went back into the studio with Joachim and started working on a concept album titled 'Intergalactic Love Story' a project of 33 songs, which tells a love story that was written in the stars. With 'Pluto' as its lead single. It was played on rotation on Danish Radio P4. Followed with 'Big Bang' as the second release, 'Interstellar' and 'Dark Matter.

== Discography ==
Singles
Song title	Year
Go	2017
More Than You See	2018
Menanti Cinta	2018
Waiting For Love	2018
Forever Mine	2019
Cinta Selamanya	2019
No Limit	2019
Head in the Clouds	2020
Keep Me in Your Heart	2020
Shine A Light	2021
Heartbreaks Not Gonna Break Me	2021
Back To Paradise	2021
Future So Bright	2021
In Another Lifetime	2022

EP DNA
Song title	Year
Still Love Me The Same	2023
The Villain	2023
Live Fast	2023
DNA	2023
Bad For Me	2023
Don't Wanna Dance	2023
Pieced Back Together	2023

Album Intergalactic Love Story
Song title	Year
Pluto	2024
Big Bang	2024
Interstellar	2024
Dark Matter	2025
