= Sofía Álvarez =

Sofía Álvarez may refer to:

- Sofía Álvarez (actress, born 1913) (1913–1985), Mexican film actress and singer of Colombian origin
- Sofía Álvarez (actress, born 1958) (born 1958), Mexican actress and writer
- Sofía Álvarez Vignoli (1899–1986), Uruguayan jurist and briefly First Lady of Uruguay
- Sofia Alvarez (writer), American playwright and screenwriter
- Sofía Álvarez (footballer) (born 2000), Mexican footballer
- Sofía Stefani Espinoza Álvarez (born 1989), Mexican political strategist
