= Sophia Schiebe =

German politician (born 1989)

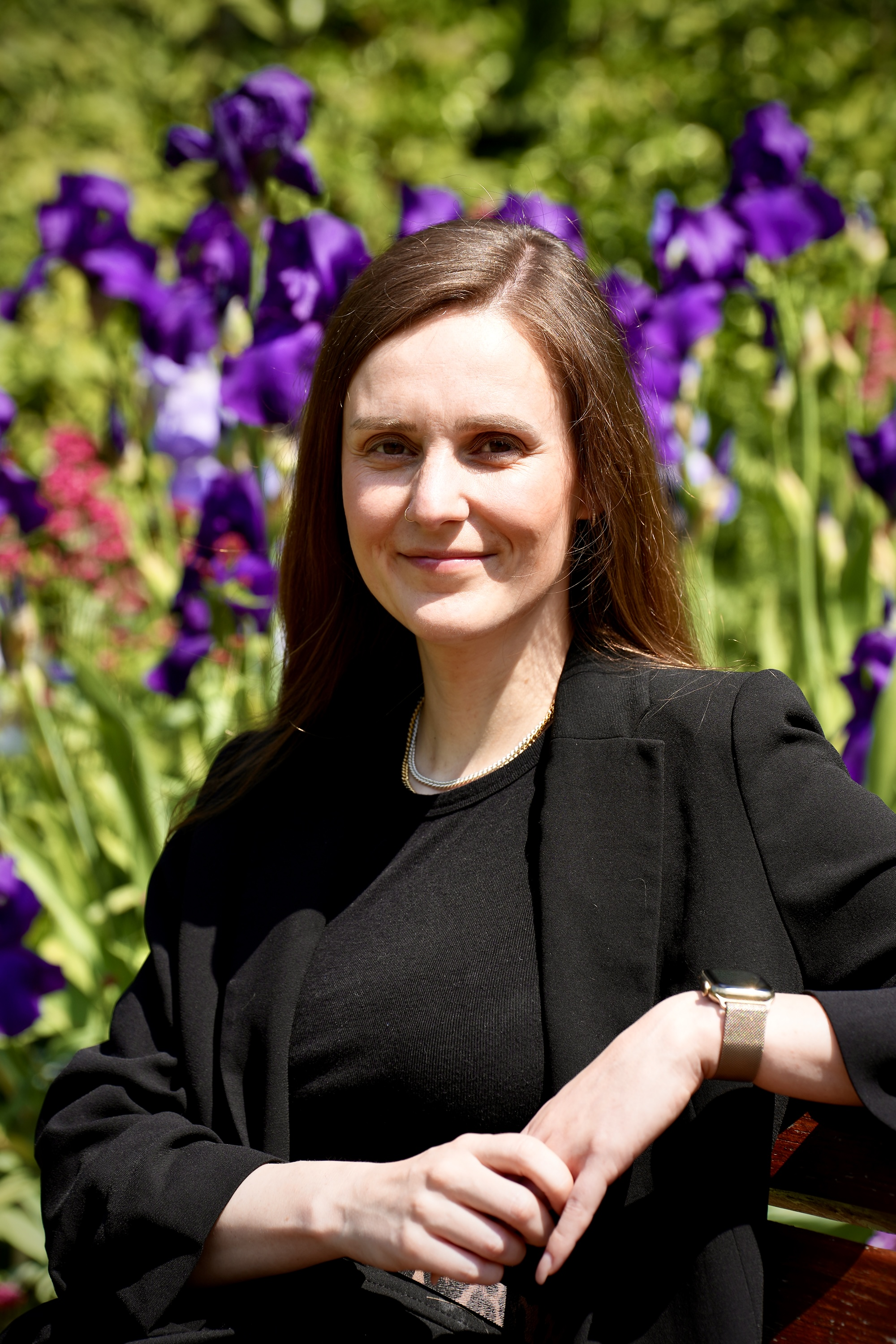
- Schiebe in 2023

Member of the Landtag of Schleswig-Holstein
- Incumbent
- Assumed office 7 June 2022

Personal details
- Born: 12 October 1989 (age 36)
- Party: Social Democratic Party

Sophia Schiebe (born 12 October 1989) is a German politician serving as a member of the Landtag of Schleswig-Holstein since 2022. She has served as deputy group leader of the Social Democratic Party since 2022.
