= Sofia Feltzing =

Swedish astronomer (b. 1965)

- Born: 26 June 1965 (age 61); Högsbo, Gothenburg, Sweden
- Education: Uppsala University (PhD)
- Scientific career
- Thesis: Two studies of the galactic chemical evolution (1995)
- Doctoral advisor: Bengt Gustafsson

Johanna Sofia Nikolina Feltzing (born 26 June 1965 in Högsbo, Gothenburg, Sweden) is a Swedish astronomer and Professor of Astronomy at Lund University since 2011. Feltzing was the first woman to complete a PhD in astronomy at Uppsala, and the tenth in Sweden.

== Biography ==
Feltzing completed her PhD at Uppsala University in 1996, publishing a dissertation about the chemical evolution of the Milky Way. She was a postdoctoral researcher at Royal Greenwich Observatory and the Institute of Astronomy, Cambridge at Cambridge University from 1996 to 1998. In 1998, she moved to Lund Observatory.

Feltzing's research primarily concerns understanding galaxy formation and evolution by studying the stars and gas of the Milky Way. She has also studied dwarf spheroidal galaxies and globular star clusters.

In 2013, Feltzing was awarded the Strömer-Ferrnerska prize of 20,000SEK by the Royal Swedish Academy of Sciences for "her spectroscopic and photometric studies which have been crucial contributions to a deeper understanding of the development of the Milky Way and its surrounding galaxies."

In 2015, Feltzing was elected to the Royal Swedish Academy of Sciences.

In 2021, an article in Nature journal reported that an investigation into victimisation by the University of Lund, using the method Faktaundersökning, found that Feltzing could have committed acts of victimisation against some other employees.
