= Sofija Garanča =

Latvian footballer

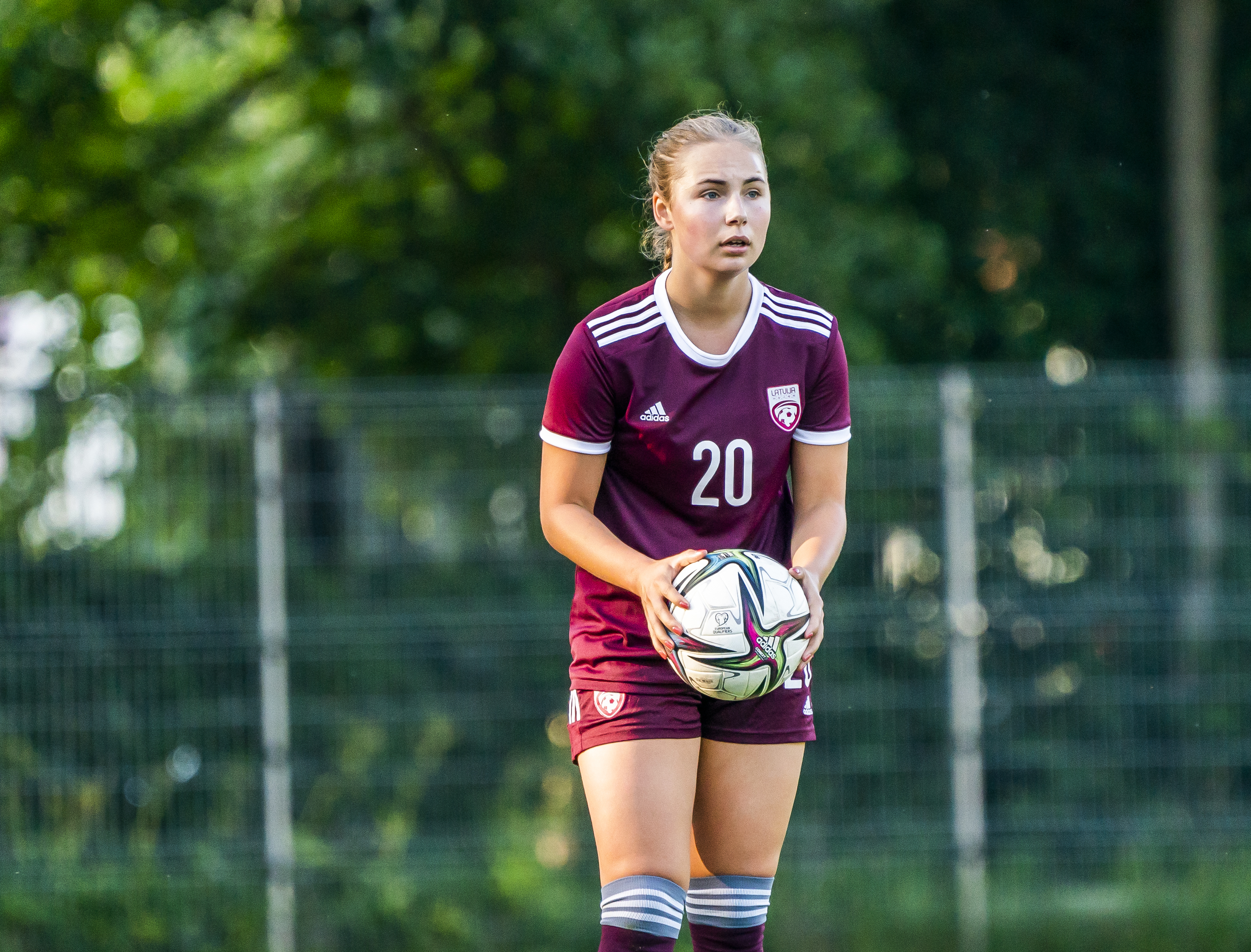

Personal information
- Date of birth: 25 May 2004 (age 22)
- Place of birth: Rēzekne, Latvia
- Position: Defender

Team information
- Current team: Rēzeknes BJSS
- Number: 4

Youth career
- 2014-2019: Rēzeknes BJSS

Senior career*
Years	Team	Apps	(Gls)
2019 - 2023	Rēzeknes BJSS	53	(17)
2019	BFC Daugavpils	4	(0)
2021-2022	SK Super Nova	14	(0)
2022-2023	FS Metta (women)	25	(5)
2022-	SFK Rīga	6	(0)

International career^{‡}
2017-2018	Latvia U-15	4	(0)
2019–2020	Latvia U-17	4	(0)
2021–2023	Latvia U-19	5	(0)
2023–	Latvia	20	(2)
- * Club domestic league appearances and goals ‡ National team caps and goals as of 15:18, 16 July 2024 (UTC)

Sofija Garanča (born 25 May 2004) is a Latvian footballer who plays as a defender for SFK Rīga and the Latvia national team.

== International career ==
Garanča made her debut for the Latvia national team on 21 September 2021, coming on as a substitute for Ligita Tumāne against Northern Ireland.
