= Sofia Börjesson =

Swedish professor in technology management

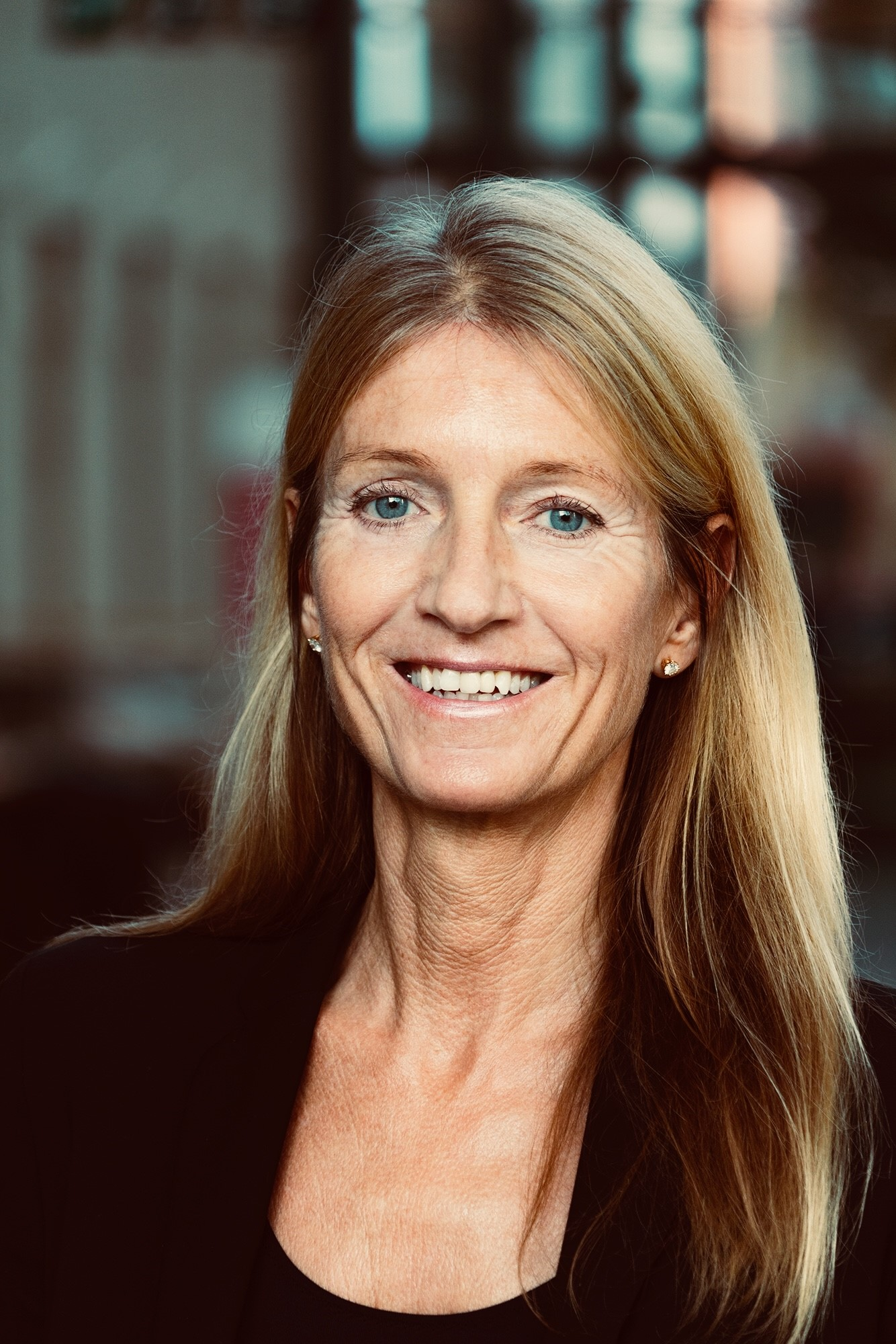
Professor Sofia Börjesson

Sofia Börjesson (born April 28, 1964) is a Swedish Professor (chair) in Technology Management Department at Chalmers University of Technology in Gothenburg Sweden. Her academic research field evolves around questions of how large, mature organizations change and develop, with focus on the management of innovation work. She works on applying innovation as an organizational transformation and in particular in a context of business model innovation. She applies qualitative methods, often collaborative research methods, cooperating with industrial partners with the intent to create actionable knowledge. She has published her work in journals such as R&D Management, Journal of Change Management, Int. J. Operations and Production Management, Technovation and Creativity and Innovation Management.

== Education ==
Sofia received her master's degree in mechanical engineering from Chalmers University of Technology in 1988. In 1990, she achieved the Licentiate degree at the department of Technology Management and Economics at the same university, titled “Prerequisites for alternative working hours in an FMS”. Seven years later, she received her Doctorate Degree, also at Chalmers University of Technology, with her thesis titled “An Analysis of two Approaches to Improvement in the Engineering Industry. Comments on FMS and ABC/ABM”.

== Employment ==
After her doctoral studies, she worked as Senior Researcher in the FENIX Research Programme. This program, which began in 1997 and ended in 2006, was a national research program offering an Executive Ph.D. programme. It was run by a collaboration between Chalmers University and the Stockholm School of Economics along with four partner firms: AstraZeneca, Ericsson, Telia and Volvo Cars. FENIX aimed to build bridges between academia and industry through collaborative research in the field of management research. When the programme ended, Sofia was recruited to be Director for CBI (Center for Business Innovation, 2007–2016). CBI was a research center within the subject of Innovation Management; here, big and small firms addressed their innovation challenges, again with a collaborative research approach.

Since 1999 she has held various managerial positions at Chalmers, e.g. Vice Dean at the Department of Technology Management and Economics and Head of Divisions of first Project Management, followed by Innovation Management and recently Head of Division of Innovation and R&D Management, together for more than 15 years. In her years affiliated to academy, she has mainly conducted collaborative research where questions address companies' change and development with focus on management of innovation work. Through the years, she has acquired strong and extensive experience in research supervision and leadership with both industrial and academic stakeholders. She currently teaches in the Department's Ph.D. School and in courses in the masters programme Management and Economics of Innovation (MEI).

== Fellowships ==
- Elected member of The Royal Swedish Academy of Engineering Sciences, since November 2012.
- Member of the Board, vice chairman for Division VI of The Royal Swedish Academy of Engineering Sciences (IVA), between 2015 and 2018.
- Member of RISE Strategic research board since 2016.
- Member of the Board, Vice Chairman, West Region, The Royal Swedish Academy of Engineering Sciences since 2017.
- Member of the Board, Viktoria Swedish ICT/RISE, between 2016 and 2018.

== Publications (selection) ==
- Working with concepts in the fuzzy front end: exploring the context for innovation for different types of concepts at Volvo Cars.
- Developing Innovation Capabilities: A Longitudinal Study of a Project at Volvo Carscaim.
- Innovative scanning experiences from an idea generation project at Volvo Cars.
- The challenges of innovation capability building: Learning from longitudinal studies of innovation efforts at Renault and Volvo Cars.
