= Sofia Hagman =

Tyler Ennis may refer to:

- Sofia Hagman (footballer) (born 1997), Swedish footballer
- Sofia Hagman (educator) (1842 – 1900), Finnish educator
