= Sophia Brown =

Sophia Brown may refer to:

- Sophia Monique Brown (born 1991), London-based actress, dancer and performance artist
- Sophia Brown (c. 1982 — 2012), 2009 Big Brother contestant
- Sophia Augusta Brown Sherman (1867–1947), American heiress and socialite
