= Sophia Wanuna =

Kenyan Journalist

- Born: Sophia Wanuna
- Known for: Journalism

Sophia Wanuna is a Kenyan journalist and KTN TV presenter. She is the editor of Standard Media group since July 2021 and is regarded as one of the few political journalists who ask tough questions to politicians. Wanuna attended the Catholic-sponsored Mirithu Girls Secondary School in the heart of Ndeiya village, Kiambu County. Prior to joining KTN TV, she was a news anchor at K24 TV of Mediamax Network Limited between 2010 and 2011.
