= Miss Sophie =

Miss Sophie may refer to:

- Miss Sophie (Dinner for One), a character in a comedy sketch
- The title character in Miss Sophia's Diary, a 1927 short story
- Miss Sophie (The Women of Brewster Place), a character in a 1989 miniseries
