= Sofia Nerbrand =

Swedish journalist and classical liberal commentator (born 1973)

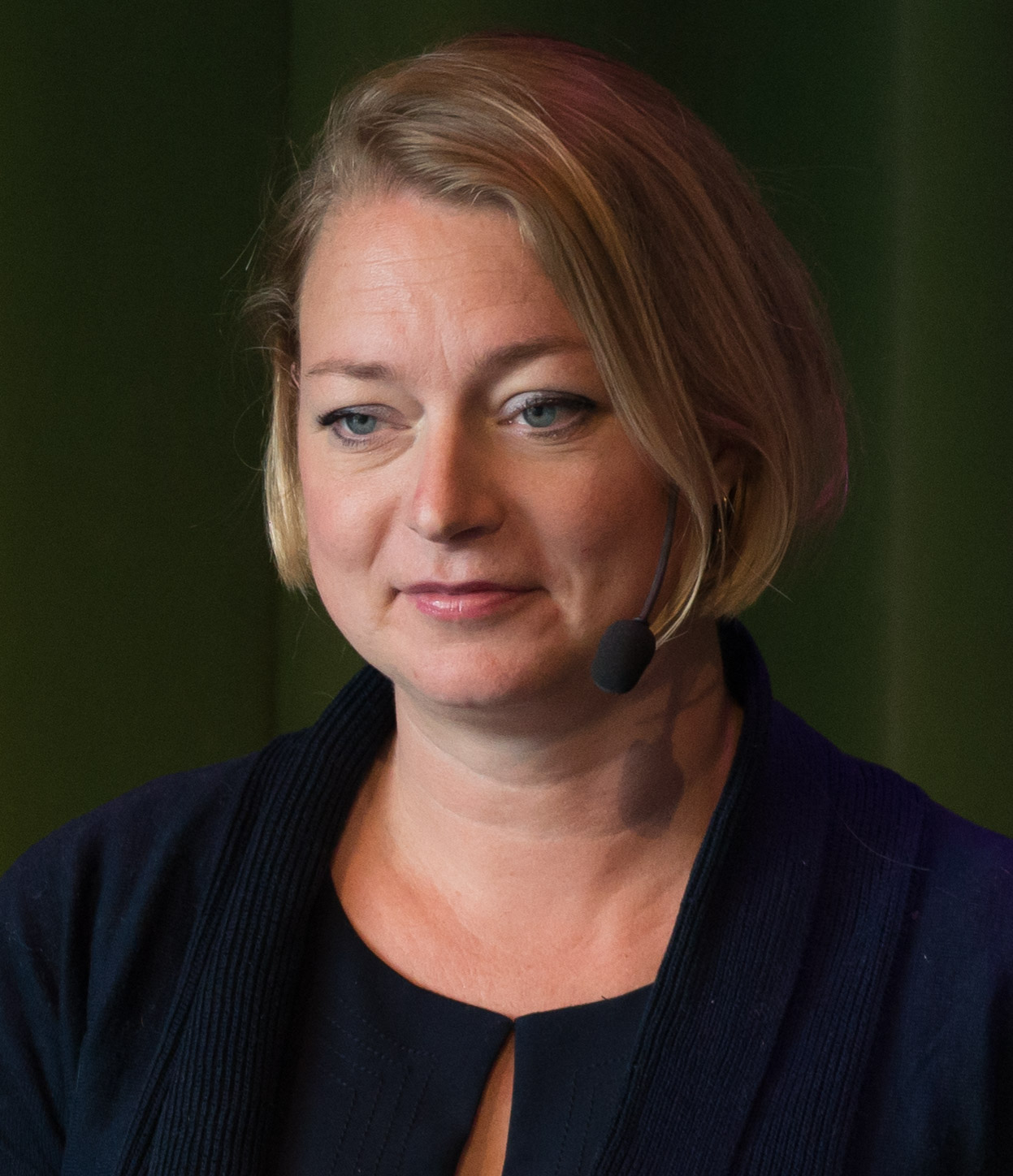
Sofia Nerbrand in 2015

Christina Sofia Nerbrand (born September 16, 1973, in Stockholm) is a Swedish journalist. She is CEO and editor-in-chief of Neo, a classical liberal magazine that she founded in 2006. Sofia Nerbrand also has a column on the op-ed page in Svenska Dagbladet. Sofia Nerbrand was married to Johan Norberg, with whom she has two children. She lives in Malmö, Sweden.
