= Sofía Rosado =

Ecuadorian lyrical soprano, pianist, cellist, and harpist

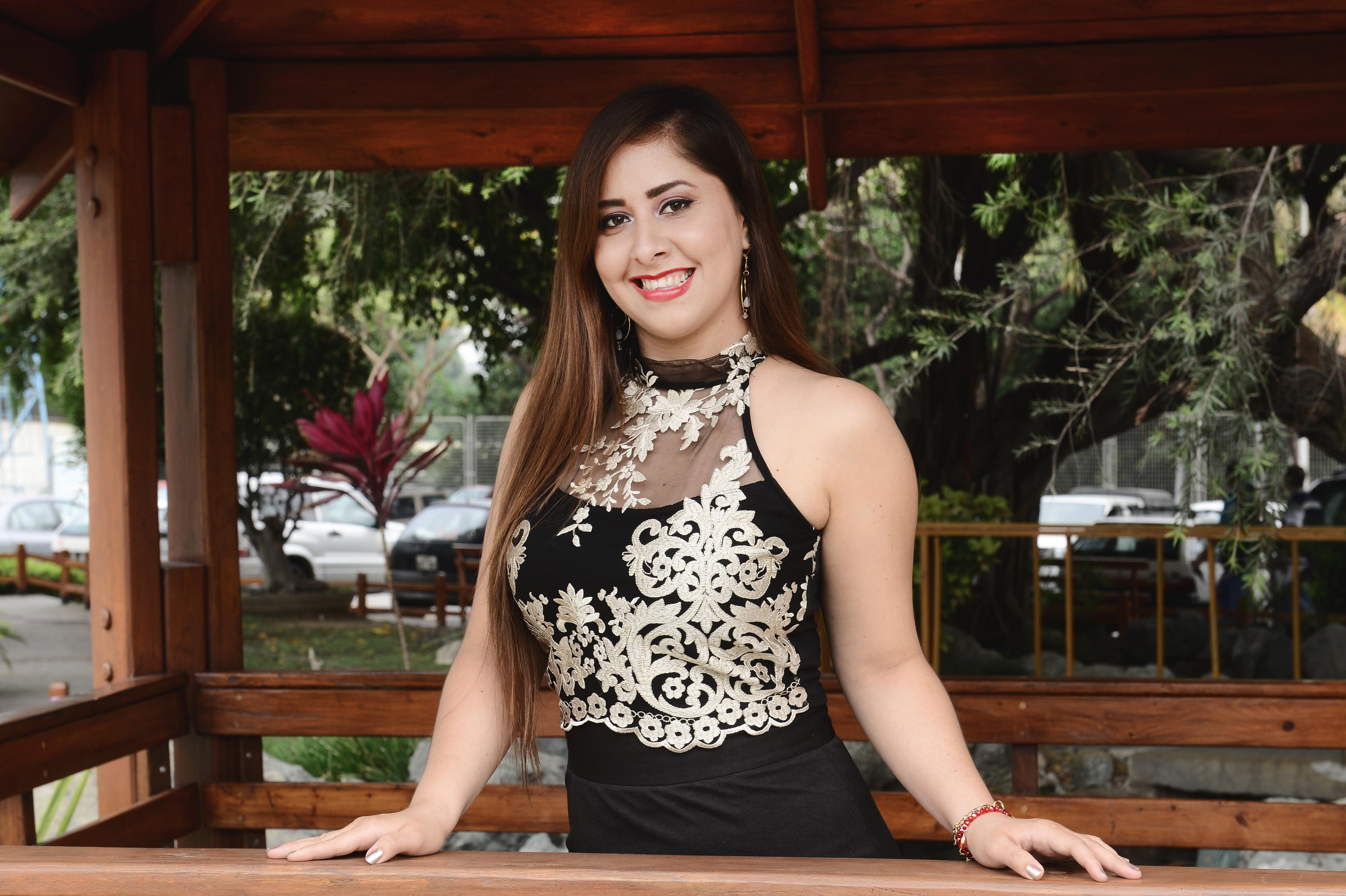
- Born: 1988 (age 37–38); Guayaquil, Ecuador
- Occupation: Opera singer

Sofía Rosado (born Guayaquil, 1988) is an Ecuadorian lyrical soprano, pianist, cellist, and harpist. Her style is oriented to classical music, the Ecuadorian music and the Andean sanjuanito. She is the daughter of the composer and writer Sebastián Rosado.

== Biography ==
At the Antonio Neumane Conservatory she studied piano with the concertina Elina Manzano, and lyrical singing with the Maestro Giovanni Ortiz; At the Municipal Museum of Popular Music, Julio Jaramillo studied harp with Ernesto Guerra. She is also a dancer of classical dance and tropical rhythms (Salsa).

== Musical career ==
She was a soloist in the Chamber Orchestra of the Municipal Museum. She was part of the chorus of the Guayaquil Symphony Orchestra and the Beatriz Parra Foundation. She has performed at the Centro Cultural Libertador Simón Bolívar and as a soloist in the chamber orchestra of the Municipal Museum, at the Centro Cívico Theater, at the Sánchez Aguilar theater, and at the Centro de Arte theater where she was part of the cast in the opera La Traviata.
