= Sofia Gennadievna Gorschkova =

Russian botanist (1889-1972)

Sofia Gennadievna Gorschkova (1889-1972) was a Soviet botanist noted for her discovery of over thirty species of plants. The standard author abbreviation Gorschk. is used to indicate this person as the author when citing a botanical name.
