= Sofia Wolfson =

American indie rock musician

Sofia Wolfson is an American indie rock musician.

== History ==
Wolfson was born and raised in Los Angeles. Wolfson recorded her first song at 9 and played her first show at 13. Wolfson recorded and released her first album when she was 15 alongside her father. Wolfson graduated from Los Angeles County High School for the Arts. Wolfson originally attended Tufts University before transferring to Occidental College. Wolfson released her first EP during her senior year of high school, after meeting producer Marshall Vore. Wolfson released her second EP in 2019 titled Adulting. The EP was also produced by Marshall Vore.
