= Sofia Pereira =

Sofia Pereira may refer to:

- Sofia Pereira (politician) (born 1999), Portuguese politician
- Sofia Pereira (gymnast) (born 2003), Brazilian rhythmic gymnast
