= Sofia Jarl =

Swedish politician

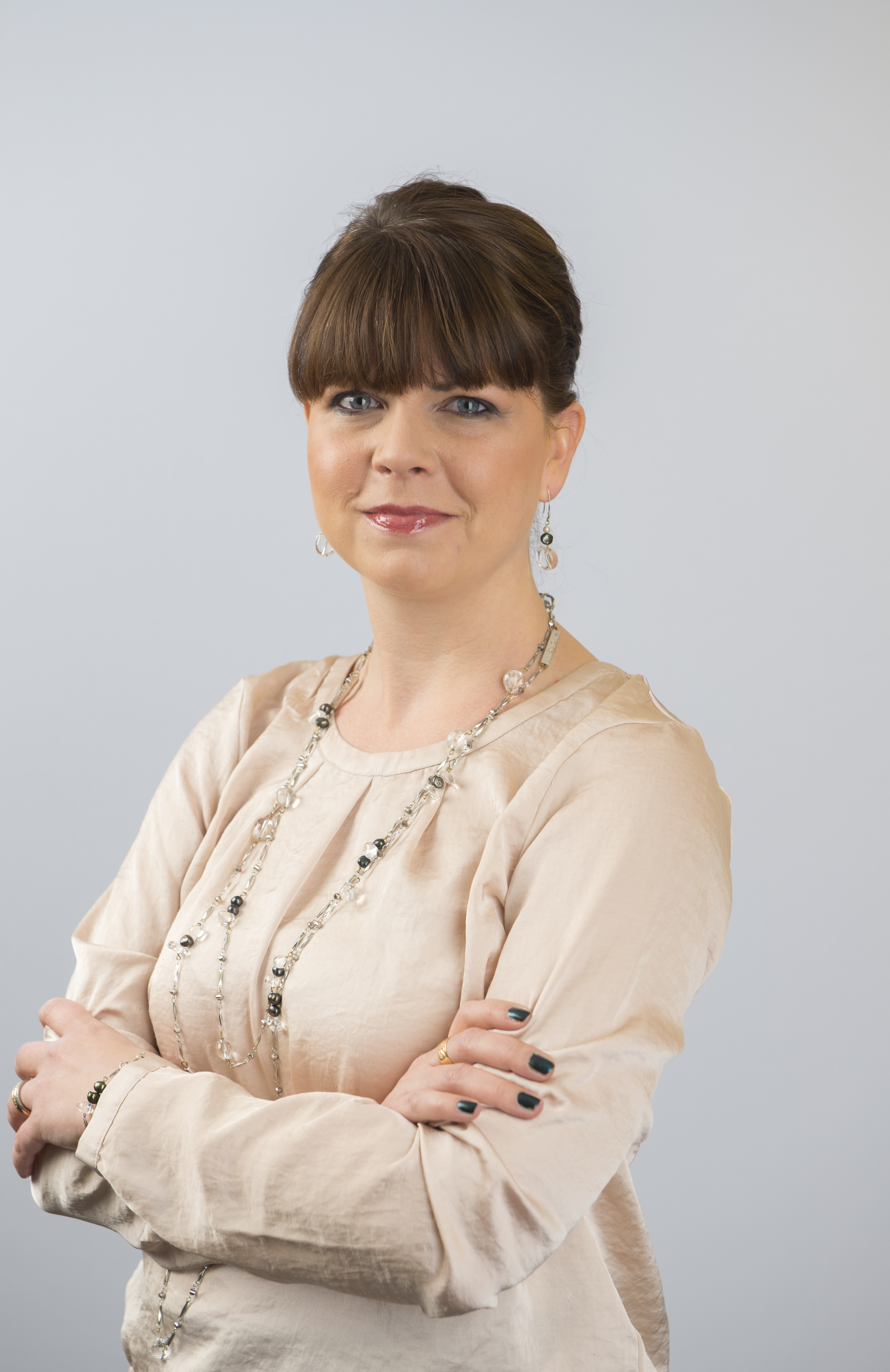
Sofia Jarl in 2012

Sofia Jarl (born 1977 with the last name Karlsson) is a Swedish politician. She is a member of the Centre Party.
