= Instituto de Medicina Molecular =

Research institution in Lisbon, Portugal

- Established: November 2001
- Focus: genome research
- Key people: Professor Joao Lobo Antunes (founder); Maria do Carmo-Fonseca (president); Maria Mota (executive director); Bruno Silva Santos (Vice-director)
- Location: Lisbon, Portugal

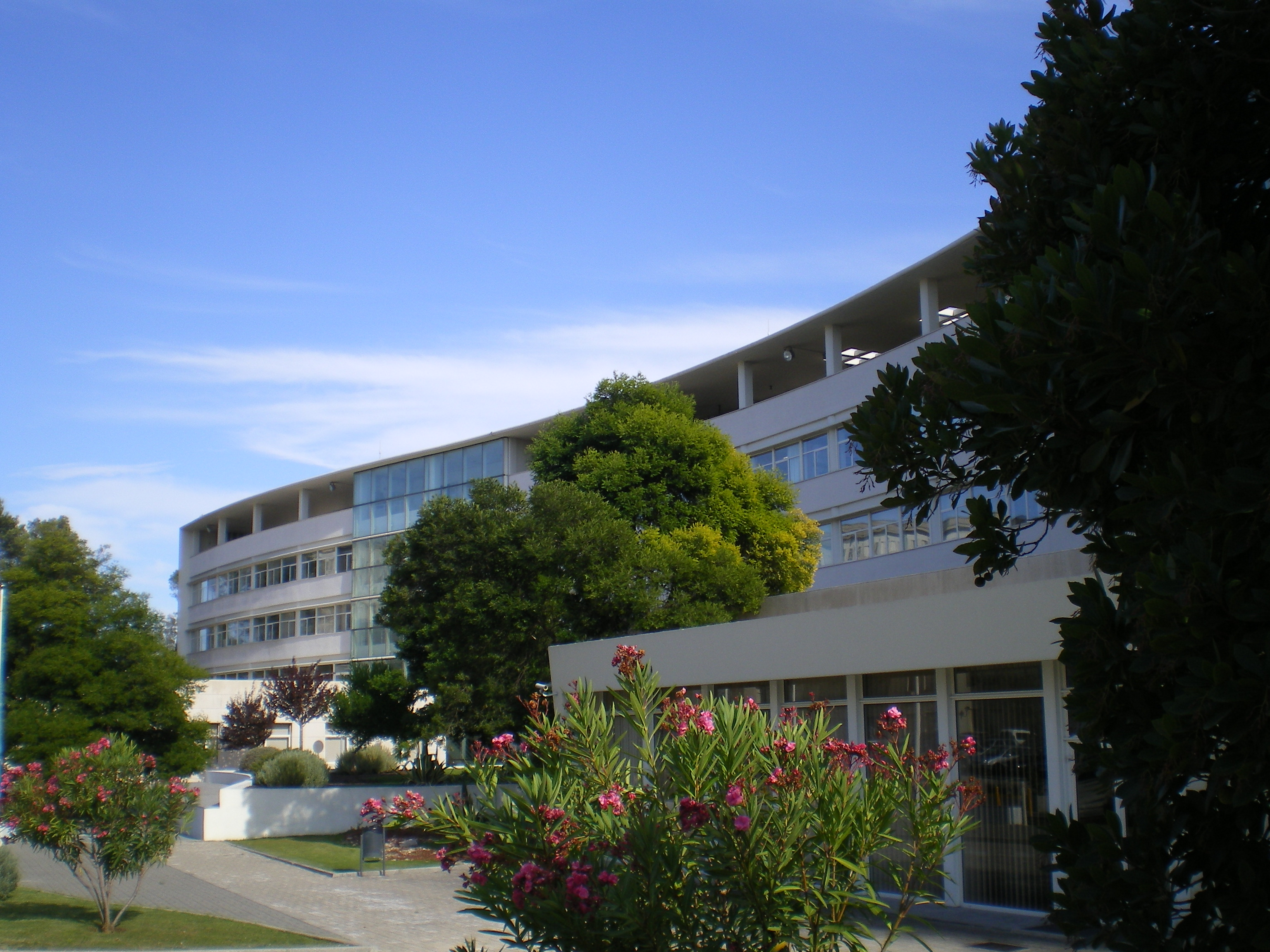
Egas Moniz building.

The Instituto de Medicina Molecular João Lobo Antunes (Institute of Molecular Medicine), or iMM for short, is an associated research institution of the University of Lisbon, in Lisbon, Portugal.

IMM is devoted to human genome research with the aim of contributing to a better understanding of disease mechanisms, developing novel predictive tests, improving diagnostics tools, and developing new therapeutic approaches.

== History ==
IMM was created in November 2001, as a result from the association of 5 research centres from the University of Lisbon Medical School: the Biology and Molecular Pathology Centre (CEBIP), the Lisbon Neurosciences Centre (CNL), the Microcirculation and Vascular Pathobiology Centre (CMBV), the Gastroenterology Centre (CG), and the Nutrition and Metabolism Centre (CNB).

In 2003, the Molecular Pathobiology Research Centre (CIPM) of the Portuguese Institute of Oncology Francisco Gentil (IPOFG) became an associate member of IMM.

Historically, IMM benefited from the full integration of academic researchers into the Lisbon Medical School who initiated their academic training and scientific careers at Instituto Gulbenkian de Ciência (IGC), in Oeiras, one of the first national institutions to introduce and make use of state-of-the-art cell and molecular biology techniques.

The IMM is now known as Instituto de Medicina Molecular João Lobo Antunes, to honour one of its founders and president (2001-2014), Professor João Lobo Antunes. Maria do Carmo-Fonseca is the current president of IMM, having served before as IMM Executive Director since its creation. The current executive director is the malaria researcher Maria Mota.
