= List of University of Michigan alumni =

Academic unit key
Symbol	Academic unit
ARCH	Taubman College of Architecture and Urban Planning
BUS	Stephen M. Ross School of Business
COE	College of Engineering
DENT	School of Dentistry
GFSPP	Gerald R. Ford School of Public Policy
HHRS	Horace H. Rackham School of Graduate Studies
LAW	Law School
LSA	College of Literature, Science, and the Arts
MED	Medical School
SMTD	School of Music, Theatre & Dance
PHARM	School of Pharmacy
SOE	Marsal Family School of Education
SNS	School for Environment and Sustainability
SOAD	Penny W. Stamps School of Art and Design
SOI	School of Information
SON	School of Nursing
SOK	School of Kinesiology
SOSW	School of Social Work
SPH	School of Public Health
MDNG	Matriculated, did not graduate

The following is a list of University of Michigan alumni.

There are more than 640,000 living alumni of the University of Michigan in 180 countries across the globe. Notable alumni include computer scientist and entrepreneur Larry Page, actor James Earl Jones, and President of the United States Gerald Ford.

== Nobel laureates ==
- Stanley Cohen (Ph.D. 1949), co-winner of the 1986 Nobel Prize in Physiology or Medicine for discovering growth factors (proteins regulating cell growth) in human and animal tissue
- Jerome Karle (Ph.D. 1944), co-winner of the 1985 Nobel Prize in Chemistry for developing direct methods for the determination of crystal structures
- Paul Milgrom (BA 1970), co-winner of the 2020 Nobel Memorial Prize in Economic Sciences for improvements to auction theory and inventions of new auction formats
- Marshall Nirenberg (Ph.D. 1957), co-winner of 1968 Nobel Prize in Physiology or Medicine for interpreting the genetic code and its function in protein synthesis
- H. David Politzer (BS 1969), co-winner of 2004 Nobel Prize in Physics for the discovery of asymptotic freedom in the theory of the strong interaction
- Robert Shiller (BA 1967), co-winner of 2013 Nobel Memorial Prize in Economic Sciences for empiricizing asset prices
- Richard Smalley (COE: BS 1965), co-winner of 1996 Nobel Prize in Chemistry for the discovery of fullerenes
- Samuel C. C. Ting (BS 1959, Ph.D. 1962), co-winner of 1976 Nobel Prize in Physics for the discovery of a heavy elementary particle of a new kind (J/ψ particle)
- Thomas H. Weller (A.B. 1936, M.S. 1937), co-winner of 1954 Nobel Prize in Physiology or Medicine for the discovery of the ability of poliomyelitis viruses to grow in cultures of various types of tissue

== Activists ==
- Benjamin Aaron (LS&A 1937), scholar of labor law; director of the National War Labor Board during World War II; vice chairman of the National Wage Stabilization Board during the Truman administration
- Ricardo Ainslie (Ph.D.), native of Mexico City, Mexico; Guggenheim award winner
- Santos Primo Amadeo (BA), a.k.a. "Champion of Hábeas Corpus;" attorney and law professor at the University of Puerto Rico; senator in the Puerto Rico legislature; counsel to the American Civil Liberties Union branch in Puerto Rico, established in 1937; winner of a Guggenheim award
- Huwaida Arraf (LS&A: 1998), Palestinian rights activist; co-founder of the International Solidarity Movement; chair of the Free Gaza Movement
- Octavia Williams Bates (BA 1877; LAW 1896), suffragist, clubwoman, author; focused on the political enfranchisement of women
- Jan BenDor (SOSW M.S.W.), women's rights activist, member of Michigan Women's Hall of Fame, 'founding mother of the Rape Crisis Center movement in Michigan,' active in the Michigan Women's Task Force on Rape
- Mary Frances Berry (LAW: JD/Ph.D.), former chairwoman of United States Civil Rights Commission, first African-American chancellor of the University of Colorado at Boulder
- Bunyan Bryant, environmental justice advocate
- Cindy Cohn (LAW: JD 1988), attorney for Bernstein v. United States, legal director for the Electronic Frontier Foundation
- Richard Cordley (BA 1854), abolitionist minister who served Lawrence, Kansas, during the 19th century
- George William Crockett (LAW: JD 1934), attorney; state court judge in Detroit, Michigan; US Representative; national vice president of the National Lawyers Guild; participated in the founding convention of the racially integrated National Lawyers Guild in 1937, and later served as its national vice president; first African-American lawyer in the U.S. Department of Labor (1939–1943)
- Clarence Darrow (LAW 1878), Leopold and Loeb lawyer, defense attorney for John T. Scopes
- Terry Davis (BUS: MBA 1962), member of the UK Parliament for 28 years, now secretary general of the Council of Europe and human rights activist
- Geoffrey Fieger (BA 1974; MA 1976), attorney; defense attorney for Jack Kevorkian
- Maureen Greenwood, human rights activist active in Russia, former director of Policy Initiatives, Women, and Population Program at the United Nations Foundation
- Alan Haber, first president of the Students for a Democratic Society
- Tom Hayden, author of Port Huron Statement; member of Chicago Seven; co-founder of Students for a Democratic Society; member of each house of California's Legislature
- Alireza Jafarzadeh, Iranian activist and nuclear analyst
- Lyman T. Johnson (AM 1931), history graduate; the grandson of slaves; successfully sued to integrate the University of Kentucky, opening that state's colleges and universities to African-Americans five years before the landmark Brown v. Board of Education ruling
- Belford Vance Lawson, Jr., attorney who made at least eight appearances before the Supreme Court; attended Michigan and became the school's first African-American varsity football player
- Susan Lederman (BA 1958), president of the League of US Women Voters
- Michael Newdow (LAW: JD 1988), made headlines by challenging the constitutionality of the Pledge of Allegiance
- Carl Oglesby, writer, academic, and political activist; president of the radical student organization Students for a Democratic Society 1965–1966
- Laura Packard (BS 1997), health care activist, spoke at 2020 Democratic National Convention, founder of Health Care Voices, executive director of Health Care Voter, executive director of Get America Covered
- H. Anna Quinby, lawyer, editor, business manager, social reformer, first woman from Ohio admitted to practice law before the Supreme Court of the United States
- Milo Radulovich, became a symbol of the excesses of anti-Communism when he challenged his removal from the Air Force Reserve (judged a security risk) and his story was chronicled by Edward Murrow in 1953 on the television newsmagazine program See It Now; in 2008 the Board of Regents approved a posthumous Bachelor of Science degree with a concentration in physics
- Ralph Rose, six-time Olympic medalist, began the tradition of refusing to dip the United States flag during opening ceremonies
- Eliza Read Sunderland (PH.B 1889; Ph.D. 1892), writer, educator, lecturer, women's rights advocate, first president of the Western Women's Conference
- Jack Hood Vaughn (BA, MA), second director of the United States Peace Corps, succeeding Sargent Shriver
- Raoul Wallenberg (ARCH: B.Arch. 1935), Swedish diplomat, rescued thousands of Jews during the Holocaust, primarily in Hungary
- Jerry White (BUS: MBA 2005), co-founder and executive director of the Landmine Survivors Network
- Mary Chawner Woody, president, North Carolina Woman's Christian Temperance Union
- Hao Wu (BUS: MBA 2000), documentary filmmaker and blogger; controversially imprisoned by Chinese government for 5 months in 2006

== Aerospace ==
- Robert A. Fuhrman (BS AE), pioneering Lockheed engineer who played a central role in the creation of the Polaris and Poseidon missiles; during more than three decades at Lockheed, he served as president of three of its companies: Lockheed-Georgia, Lockheed-California, and Lockheed Missiles & Space; became president and chief operating officer of the corporation in 1986 and vice chairman in 1988; retired in 1990
- Edgar Nathaniel Gott (COE: 1909), early aviation industry executive; co-founder and first president of the Boeing Company; senior executive of several aircraft companies, including Fokker and Consolidated Aircraft
- Robert Hall (COE: BSE 1927), designer of the Granville Brothers Aircraft Gee Bee Z racer that won the 1931 Thompson Trophy race; Grumman test pilot; credited with major role in the design of the Grumman F4F Wildcat, F6F Hellcat and TBM Avenger
- Willis Hawkins (COE: BSE 1937), Lockheed engineer; contributed to the designs of historic Lockheed aircraft including the Constellation, P-80 Shooting Star, XF-90, F-94 Starfire, F-104 Starfighter and C-130 Hercules; later president of Lockheed
- Clarence "Kelly" Johnson (COE: 1932 BSE, 1933 MSE, 1964 PhD (Hon.)), founder of the Lockheed Skunk Works; designer of the Lockheed P-38 Lightning, P-80 Shooting Star, JetStar, F-104 Starfighter, U-2 and SR-71 Blackbird; winner of the National Medal of Science
- Vania Jordanova (Ph.D. 1995), physicist, fellow of the American Geophysical Union
- Edgar J. Lesher, aircraft designer; pilot; professor of aerospace engineering
- Elizabeth Muriel Gregory "Elsie" MacGill (COE: MSE) OC, known as the "Queen of the Hurricanes"; first female aircraft designer, first woman to earn an aeronautical engineering degree, first woman in Canada to receive a bachelor's degree in electrical engineering

=== Astronauts ===
Two NASA space flights have been crewed entirely by University of Michigan degree-holders.

- Gemini IV's all-Michigan crew flew in 1965 and has a campus plaza named after them:
  - James McDivitt (COE: BSE AA 1959, ScD hon. 1965), graduated first in his class; command pilot Gemini 4 part of an all UM crew, 1965; commander Apollo 9; Program Manager for Apollo 12–16; brigadier general, U.S. Air Force; vice president (retired), Rockwell International Corporation
  - Ed White (COE: MSAE 1959, Hon. PhD Astronautics 1965), first American to walk in space (Gemini 4) part of an all UM crew, 1965; died in Apollo 1 test accident, 1967
- Apollo 15's all-Michigan crew left a plaque on the Moon establishing a lunar chapter of the University of Michigan Alumni Association in 1971:
  - James Irwin (COE: MSAE 1957), Apollo 15, 1971, one of twelve men to have walked on the Moon; one of six men to ride the Lunar Roving Vehicle on the Moon
  - David Scott (MDNG: 1949–1950; ScD hon. 1971), Apollo 15, 1971; one of twelve men to have walked on the Moon; first man to drive a lunar rover on the Moon
  - Alfred Worden (COE: MSAE 1964, Scd hon. 1971), Apollo 15, 1971

Other astronaut alumni include:

- Daniel T. Barry (medical internship), retired NASA astronaut
- Andre Douglas, (M.S. (Dual) 2012), NASA astronaut, 2021
- Theodore Freeman (COE: MSAE 1960), one of the third group of astronauts selected by NASA; died in T-38 crash at Ellington Air Force Base
- Karl G. Henize (Ph.D. 1954), STS-51-F, 1985
- Jack Lousma (COE: BSAE 1959), Skylab 3 1973; STS-3, 1982
- Donald Ray McMonagle (MBA 2003), retired USAF colonel, USAF; became manager of launch integration at the Kennedy Space Center in 1997
- James M. Taylor (B.S. 1959), Air Force astronaut, test pilot

=== NASA ===
- Claudia Alexander (Ph.D. 1993), member of the technical staff at the Jet Propulsion Laboratory; the last project manager of NASA's Galileo mission to Jupiter; project manager of NASA's role in the European-led Rosetta mission to study comet 67P/Churyumov-Gerasimenko; once named UM's Woman of the Year
- Spence M. Armstrong (M.S.), retired United States Air Force general officer, combat veteran, and test pilot; spent eleven years as a senior executive at NASA
- Jim Blinn, computer scientist who first became widely known for his work as a computer graphics expert at NASA's Jet Propulsion Laboratory (JPL)
- Scott J. Bolton (B.S.E.), principal investigator with NASA on various research programs since 1988; principal investigator of Juno, a New Frontiers program mission to Jupiter which began primary science in 2016
- Aisha Bowe (BS, MS 2009), NASA aerospace engineer at Ames Research Center; CEO of STEMBoard, a technology company; recipient of the NASA Equal Employment Opportunity Medal
- Beth A. Brown (Ph.D.), NASA astrophysicist with a research focus on X-ray observations of elliptical galaxies and black holes; earned a Ph.D. in astronomy from the University of Michigan in 1998, the first African-American woman to do so
- Steve Chappell, aerospace engineer; technical lead and research specialist for Wyle Integrated Science & Engineering at NASA's Johnson Space Center (JSC) in Houston, Texas
- Bob Dempsey (B.S.), NASA flight director for the International Space Station selected in 2005; as astronomer he worked at the Space Telescope Science Institute (STScI) prior to joining the ISS project
- Allen F. Donovan (M.S.), worked with NASA to solve the problem of combustion instability that affected Project Mercury, and later on the pogo oscillation problems that affected Project Gemini and Project Apollo
- Jeff Dozier (Ph.D.), senior member of the technical staff and the Project Scientist for a potential spectroscopy space mission at NASA's Jet Propulsion Laboratory; worked 1990–1992 at the NASA Goddard Space Flight Center as the senior project scientist at the start of NASA's Earth Observing System
- Julian Earls, director of the Glenn Research Center
- Usama Fayyad (Ph.D.), held a leadership role 1989–1996 at NASA's Jet Propulsion Laboratory (JPL), where his work in the analysis and exploration of Big Data in scientific applications garnered him the Lew Allen Award for Excellence in Research, as well as a U.S. Government medal from NASA
- Mei-Ching Hannah Fok (Ph.D.), planetary scientist at the Goddard Space Flight Center; awarded the NASA Exceptional Scientific Achievement Medal in 2011 and elected a fellow of the American Geophysical Union in 2019; worked on the IMAGE, Van Allen Probes and TWINS missions
- Jack Garman (B.S.), computer engineer, former senior NASA executive and noted key figure of the Apollo 11 lunar landing
- William W. Hagerty (Ph.D.), advisor to NASA 1964–1970; board member for the National Science Foundation
- Margaret Hamilton, led a team credited with developing the software for Apollo and Skylab
- Martin Harwit (M.S.), designed, built and launched the first rocket-powered liquid-helium-cooled telescopes in the late 1960s; carried out astronomical observations from high-altitude NASA aircraft
- Richard C. Henry (M.S.), lieutenant general in the United States Air Force who served as commander of the Space Division, Air Force Systems Command, Los Angeles Air Force Station, CA
- Dorothy McFadden Hoover (A.B.D.), physicist and mathematician; pioneer in the early days of NASA; hired at the National Advisory Committee for Aeronautics (NACA, later NASA) in Langley in 1943 as a professional (P-1) mathematician
- John T. Howe (B.S.E.), during his 35 years with NASA, he served as senior staff scientist, head of aerothermodynamics, assistant chief for the physics branch, and branch chief for fluid dynamics
- James Kasting (Ph.D.), active in NASA's search for habitable extrasolar planets
- Hyuck Kwon (Ph.D.), with the Lockheed Engineering and Sciences Company, Houston, Texas, 1989–1993, as a principal engineer, working for NASA Space Shuttle and Space Station satellite communication systems
- Joel S. Levine (Ph.D.), worked at Langley Research Center 1970–2011, worked on Viking program
- Bernard Lippmann (M.S.), senior research associate at NASA's Goddard Institute for Space Studies, 1968–1969
- James Fu Bin Lu, Internet entrepreneur; engineer for NASA's Jet Propulsion Laboratory, developing software for the Mars rover
- Harriet H. Malitson (M.S.), astronomer; solar researcher at Goddard Space Flight Center and at the National Oceanic and Atmospheric Administration
- Stephen P. Maran (Ph.D.), astrophysicist at NASA's Goddard Space Flight Center, 1969–2004; served as a staff scientist, project scientist, and principal investigator, and was involved in research on a number of missions, including the Hubble Space Telescope
- James Slattin Martin Jr. (B.S.), joined NASA's Langley Research Center in 1964 as assistant project manager for Lunar Orbiter; awarded the NASA Exceptional Service Medal in 1967
- Rob Meyerson (B.S.), aerospace engineer at NASA Johnson Space Center (JSC), 1985–1997, working on human spaceflight systems, including the aerodynamic design of the Space Shuttle orbiter drag parachute; former president of Blue Origin
- Hu Peiquan (Ph.D.), 1944, became a researcher at the Langley Research Center of the National Advisory Committee for Aeronautics (NACA, the predecessor of NASA)
- Samuel C. Phillips (M.S.) (February 19, 1921 – January 31, 1990), United States Air Force general; director of NASA's Apollo program 1964–1969; the seventh director of the National Security Agency, 1972–1973; Commander of Air Force Systems Command, 1973–1975
- Phil Plait, worked with the COBE satellite and later was part of the Hubble Space Telescope team at NASA Goddard Space Flight Center, working largely on the Space Telescope Imaging Spectrograph
- Elisa Quintana (Ph.D.), member of the NASA Kepler Mission Team at NASA Ames Research Center 2006–2017; scientific programmer developing the Kepler pipeline, for which she was awarded NASA Software of the Year in 2010
- Judith Racusin (B.S.), astrophysicist;research aerospace technologist in fields and particles at Goddard Space Flight Center
- William H. Robbins (B.S.), engineer for NASA; worked on the NERVA nuclear rocket engine, NASA wind turbines, communication satellites, and the Shuttle-Centaur program
- Louis W. Roberts (M.S.), microwave physicist; chief of the Microwave Laboratory at NASA's Electronics Research Center in the 1960s
- James Russell III (Ph.D.), atmospheric scientist; served as the developer of instrumentation for several NASA probes
- Kamal Sarabandi (Ph.D.), member of Science Team for NASA Soil Moisture Active and Passive (SMAP)
- Joseph Francis Shea (BS 1946, MS 1950, Ph.D. 1955), manager of the Apollo Spacecraft Program office during Project Apollo
- Roy Spencer, meteorologist, principal research scientist at the University of Alabama in Huntsville, and the U.S. Science Team leader for the Advanced Microwave Scanning Radiometer (AMSR-E) on NASA's Aqua satellite
- Vaino Jack Vehko (B.S.), in 1960, director of engineering on the Saturn S-I and S-IB booster rockets, the forerunners of the Saturn V that launched the NASA Apollo Moon missions
- Kevin J. Zahnle (Ph.D.), planetary scientist at the NASA Ames Research Center; fellow of the American Geophysical Union; studies impact processes, atmospheric escape processes, geochemical modelling of atmophiles, and photochemical modelling
- Noel Zamot (M.S.); member of the NASA Astronaut Training Group 16; semifinalist NASA astronaut candidate

== Computers, engineering, and technology ==
- Benjamin Franklin Bailey, inventor of the capacitor motor; chief engineer of the Fairbanks Morse Electrical Manufacturing Company
- Arden L. Bement Jr. (Ph.D. 1963), engineer and scientist; elected a member of the National Academy of Engineering for contributions to the understanding of irradiation effects in nuclear materials and development of advanced materials concepts for defense applications; director of the National Science Foundation; awarded the ANSI's Chairman's award in 2005
- James Blinn (BS Physics and Communications Science 1970, MS Information and Control Engineering, 1972), elected a member of the National Academy of Engineering for contributions to the technology of educational use of computer graphics and for expository articles; 1991 MacArthur Fellowship
- Katie Bouman (BS Electrical Engineering 2011), developer of CHIRP, an algorithm used in filtering the first images of a black hole taken by the Event Horizon Telescope
- Lee Boysel (BSE EE 1962, MSE EE 1963), developer of four-phase logic; creator of the first integrated circuit with over 100 logic gates, the Fairchild 3800 / 3804 8-bit ALUs, and the Four-Phase Systems AL1
- John Seely Brown (Ph.D. 1970), former chief scientist of Xerox, co-author of The Social Life of Information
- Arthur W. Burks (Ph.D. 1941), member of the team that designed the Eniac computer as well as the IAS machine; frequent collaborator of John von Neumann
- Robert Cailliau (COE: MSc Computer, Information and Control Engineering 1971), co-developer of the World Wide Web; won the 1995 ACM Software System Award with Tim Berners-Lee
- Edward S. Davidson, developer of the reservation table approach to optimum design and cyclic scheduling of pipelines; designer of an eight-node symmetric multiprocessor system; winner of the 2000 IEEE/ACM Eckert-Mauchly Award "for his seminal contributions to the design, implementation, and performance evaluation of high performance pipelines and multiprocessor systems"
- Paul Debevec (ENG: BA CSE), researcher known for his pioneering work in high-dynamic-range imaging and image-based modelling and rendering; honored by the Academy of Motion Picture Arts and Sciences in 2010 with a Scientific and Engineering Academy Award
- Mike Engelhardt (Physics 1981), original author of LTspice, an analog circuit simulator
- Tony Fadell (COE: BSE CompE 1991), co-creator of iPhone and iPod
- James D. Foley (Ph.D. 1969), former chairman of the Computing Research Association; co-author of several widely used textbooks in the field of computer graphics; ACM Fellow; IEEE Fellow; recipient of 1997 Steven A. Coons Award
- Stephanie Forrest (Ph.D.), known for her work in adaptive systems, including genetic algorithms, computational immunology, biological modeling, automated software repair, and computer security; recipient of ACM - AAAI Allen Newell Award 2011
- Lee Giles (M.S.), co-creator of CiteSeer; ACM Fellow; IEEE Fellow
- John Henry Holland, originator of genetic algorithms
- Thomas Knoll (COE: BS EP 1982, MSE CI CE 1984), one of the two original authors of Adobe Photoshop
- John R. Koza (Ph.D. 1972), known for his work in pioneering the use of genetic programming for the optimization of complex problems
- Andrea Kritcher (BS), developer of Hybrid-E, a capsule that enables inertial confinement fusion; fellow of the American Physical Society
- David Kuck (BS), developer of the Parafrase compiler system, which was the first testbed for the development of automatic vectorization and related program transformations; led the construction of the CEDAR project, a hierarchical shared-memory 32-processor SMP supercomputer completed in 1988 at the University of Illinois; IEEE award winner
- Chris Langton (Ph.D.), one of the founders of the field of artificial life; distinguished expellee of the Santa Fe Institute
- Eugene McAllaster (BS 1889), designer of Seattle's historic fireboat Duwamish
- Sid Meier, creator of computer games Civilization, Pirates!, Railroad Tycoon, and SimGolf
- Kunle Olukotun (Ph.D.), pioneer of multi-core processor; IEEE award winner
- Larry Page (COE: BSE 1995), co-creator and namesake of PageRank, a search ranking algorithm for Google; elected to the National Academy of Engineering in 2004; founder of Google
- Niels Provos (Ph.D.), developer of the bcrypt adaptive cryptographic hash function for the OpenBSD operating system; author of numerous software packages, including the libevent event-driven programming system, the Systrace access control system, the honeyd honeypot system, the StegDetect steganography detector, and the Bcrypt password encryption technique
- Avi Rubin (Ph.D.), expert in systems and networking security; led the research team that successfully cracked the security code of Texas Instruments' RFID chip; holds eight patents for computer security-related inventions
- Silvio Savarese (faculty 2008–2013), computer scientist and AI researcher; professor of computer science at Stanford University and executive vice president and chief scientist at Salesforce; named to Time's 100 Most Influential People in AI in 2024
- Claude E. Shannon (COE: BS EE 1936, BA Math 1936), "father of information theory"; one of the founding fathers of artificial intelligence; credited alongside George Boole for laying the foundations of the Information Age
- Joseph Francis Shea (BS 1946, MS 1950, Ph.D. 1955), manager of the Apollo Spacecraft Program office during Project Apollo
- Linda Zhang (BS EE 1996, MBA 1998, MS 2011), chief engineer for the Ford F-150 Lightning

=== Turing Award winners ===
- Frances E. Allen (M.Sc. 1957), winner of the 2006 Turing Award for pioneering contributions to the theory and practice of optimizing compiler techniques that laid the foundation for modern optimizing compilers and automatic parallel execution; winner of Ada Lovelace Award
- Andrew Barto (B.S., Ph.D.), winner of the 2024 Turing Award for inventing the field of Reinforcement Learning
- Edgar F. Codd (Ph.D. 1965), winner of the 1981 Turing Award for his fundamental and continuing contributions to the theory and practice of database management systems
- Stephen A. Cook (A.B. 1961); winner of the 1982 Turing Award for his advancement of our understanding of the complexity of computation
- Michael Stonebraker (Ph.D. 1971), winner of the 2014 Turing award for fundamental contributions to the concepts and practices underlying modern database systems

=== Ada Lovelace Award and Grace Murray Hopper Award winners ===
- Dorothy E. Denning, ACM Fellow; the 2001 Augusta Ada Lovelace Award from the Assoc. for Women in Computing acknowledged "her outstanding in computer security and cryptography as well as her extraordinary contributions to national policy debates on cyber terrorism and information warfare
- Margaret Hamilton 1986 winner of the Augusta Ada Lovelace Award; Presidential Medal of Freedom recipient for her work leading to the development of on-board flight software for NASA's Apollo Moon missions
- Bill Joy (COE: BSE CompE 1975, 2004 D.Eng. (Hon.)), co-founder of Sun Microsystems; given 1986 Grace Murray Hopper Award by the ACM for his work on the UNIX operating system
- Jennifer Rexford (MSE 1993; Ph.D. 1996), winner of ACM's 2004 Grace Murray Hopper Award for outstanding young computer professional of the year

=== AAAI, ACM, IEEE Fellows and awardees ===
As of 2021, more than 65 Michigan alumni have been named as Fellows. Of those alumni, four have been awarded the Eckert-Mauchly Award (out of the 42 total awards granted), the most prestigious award for contributions to computer architecture.

- Gul Agha, IEEE ACM Fellow
- Frances Allen, ACM Fellow; computer scientist and pioneer in the field of optimizing compilers; first woman to win the Turing Award; first woman to become an IBM Fellow
- Remzi Arpaci-Dusseau, ACM Fellow; winner of the SIGOPS Mark Weiser Award
- Farrokh Ayazi, named fellow of the Institute of Electrical and Electronics Engineers (IEEE) in 2013 for contributions to micro-electro-mechanical resonators and resonant gyroscopes
- Andrew Barto, IEEE Fellow; IEEE Neural Networks Society Pioneer Award
- Paul R. Berger (BS Engin. Physics 1985, MS EE 1987, Ph.D. EE 1990), named an IEEE Fellow (2011), an Outstanding Engineering Educator for State of Ohio (2014) and a Fulbright-Nokia Distinguished Chair in Information and Communications Technologies (2020)
- Randal Bryant, ACM Fellow; IEEE Fellow
- Robert Cailliau, ACM Software System Award for co-development of the World Wide Web
- Sunghyun Choi, named an IEEE Fellow in 2014
- Edgar F. Codd, Turing Award winner, English computer scientist; while working for IBM, invented the relational model for database management, the theoretical basis for relational databases and relational database management systems; Turing Award winner
- Stephen Cook, ACM Fellow; OC, OOnt (born December 14, 1939), American-Canadian computer scientist and mathematician who has made major contributions to the fields of complexity theory and proof complexity as a Turing Award winner
- Edward S. Davidson, IEEE Fellow; 2000 IEEE/ACM Eckert-Mauchly Award "for his seminal contributions to the design, implementation, and performance evaluation of high performance pipelines and multiprocessor systems"
- David DeWitt, ACM Fellow; received the ACM SIGMOD Innovations Award (now renamed SIGMOD Edgar F. Codd Innovations Award) in 1995 for his contributions to the database systems field
- Alexandra Duel-Hallen, professor of electrical and computer engineering at North Carolina State University known for her research in wireless networks; named an IEEE Fellow in 2011
- George V. Eleftheriades, researcher in the field of metamaterials; fellow of the IEEE and the Royal Society of Canada
- Usama Fayyad, holds over 30 patents; fellow of both the AAAI (Association for Advancement of Artificial Intelligence) and the ACM (Association for Computing Machinery)
- Michael J. Fischer, ACM Fellow; computer scientist who works in the fields of distributed computing, parallel computing, cryptography, algorithms and data structures, and computational complexity; editor-in-chief of the Journal of the ACM 1982–1986
- James D. Foley, ACM Fellow an IEEE Fellow and a member of the National Academy of Engineering
- Stephanie Forrest, ACM/AAAI Allen Newell Award (2011)
- Gerard Gaynor, IEEE Fellow
- Elmer G. Gilbert, IEEE Fellow; in control theory, well known for the "Gilbert realization"; member of the National Academy of Engineering; fellow of IEEE and the American Association for the Advancement of Science
- Lee Giles, ACM Fellow; IEEE Fellow; recipient of 2018 Institute of Electrical and Electronics Engineers (IEEE) Computational Intelligence Society (CIS) Neural Networks Pioneer Award and the 2018 National Federation of Advanced Information Services (NFAIS) Miles Conrad Award
- Adele Goldberg, president of the Association for computing Machinery (ACM), 1984–1986
- Robert M. Graham, ACM Fellow, cybersecurity researcher computer scientist
- Herb Grosch, ACM Fellow; received the Association for Computing Machinery Fellows Award in 1995; early computer scientist, perhaps best known for Grosch's law
- Mark Guzdial, ACM Fellow, original developer of the CoWeb (or Swiki), one of the earliest wiki engines, which was implemented in Squeak and has been in use at institutions of higher education since 1998
- Rick Hayes-Roth, AAAI Fellow
- Mark D. Hill, named an Association for Computing Machinery Fellow in 2004 for "contributions to memory consistency models and memory system design"; ACM SIGARCH Alan D. Berenbaum Distinguished Service Award in 2009; in 2019, he received the 2019 ACM - IEEE CS Eckert-Mauchly Award for "seminal contributions to the fields of cache memories, memory consistency models, transactional memory, and simulation"
- Julia Hirschberg, IEEE Fellow, member of the National Academy of Engineering, ACM Fellow, AAAI Fellow
- John M. Hollerbach, named IEEE Fellow in 1996
- Tara Javidi, IEEE Fellow
- Bill Joy, co-founder of Sun Microsystems; in 1986, was awarded a Grace Murray Hopper Award by the ACM for his work on the Berkeley UNIX Operating System
- Nam Sung Kim, IEEE Fellow
- John D. Kraus, IEEE Fellow; winner of a IEEE Centennial Medal winner of the IEEE Heinrich Hertz Medal
- David Kuck, fellow of the American Association for the Advancement of Science, the Association for Computing Machinery (ACM), and the Institute of Electrical and Electronics Engineers; member of the National Academy of Engineering; won the Eckert-Mauchly Award from ACM/IEEE and the IEEE Computer Society Charles Babbage Award
- John E. Laird, ACM Fellow; AAAI Fellow; AAAS member
- Cliff Lampe, executive vice president for ACM SIGCHI since 2018
- Carl Landwehr, IEEE Fellow; winner of the ACM's SIGSAC's Outstanding Contribution Award (2013)
- Peter Lee, ACM Fellow; longtime "Microsoft researcher" and became the organization's head in 2013
- Chih-Jen Lin, ACM Fellow, AAAI Fellow, IEEE Fellow; a leading researcher in machine learning, optimization, and data mining
- K. J. Ray Liu, IEEE Fellow; elected as 2021 IEEE president-elect, to serve as 2022 IEEE president and CEO
- Patrick Drew McDaniel, ACM Fellow; IEEE Fellow
- Olgica Milenkovic, named an IEEE Fellow "for contributions to genomic data compression"
- David L. Mills, invented the Network Time Protocol (1981), the DEC LSI-11 based fuzzball router that was used for the 56 kbit/s NSFNET (1985), the Exterior Gateway Protocol (1984), inspired the author of ping for BSD (1983), and had the first FTP implementation; IEEE Fellow; winner of the IEEE Internet Award in 2013
- Yi Murphey, IEEE Fellow
- Shamkant Navathe, ACM Fellow; noted researcher in the field of databases with more than 150 publications on different topics in the area of databases
- Judith S. Olson, ACM Fellow with over 110 published research articles
- Kunle Olukotun, ACM Fellow; is known as the "father of the multi-core processor"
- Elliott Organick, founder of ACM Special Interest Group on Computer Science Education, SIGCSE Award for Outstanding Contribution to Computer Science Education (1985)
- C. Raymond Perrault, named a founding member of AAAI in 1990 and a AAAS member in 2011
- Raymond Reiter, fellow of the Association for Computing Machinery (ACM), AAAI fellow, and fellow of the Royal Society of Canada
- Paul Resnick, ACM Fellow as a result of his contributions to recommender systems, economics and computation, and online communities; winner of the 2010 ACM Software Systems Award
- Jennifer Rexford, won the ACM Grace Murray Hopper Award (the award goes to a computer professional who makes a single, significant technical or service contribution at or before age 35) in 2005, for her work on introducing network routing subject to the different business interests of the operators of different subnetworks into Border Gateway Protocol
- Wally Rhines, named overall CEO of the Year by Portland Business Journal in 2012 and Oregon Technology Executive of the Year by the Technology Association of Oregon in 2003; named an IEEE Fellow in 2017
- Keith W. Ross, ACM Fellow; Dean of Engineering and Computer Science at NYU Shanghai and a computer science professor at the New York University Tandon School of Engineering
- Ronitt Rubinfeld, ACM Fellow as of 2017 for Association for Computing Machinery for contributions to delegated computation, sublinear time algorithms and property testing
- Rob A. Rutenbar, ACM Fellow, IEEE Fellow
- Claude Shannon, IEEE Medal of Honor, National Medal of Science, Claude E. Shannon Award
- Daniel Siewiorek, ACM, AAAS, IEEE Fellow; winner of the IEEE/ACM Eckert-Mauchly Award
- David Slepian, IEEE Fellow; winner of a IEEE Centennial Medal
- Anna Stefanopoulou, IEEE Fellow
- Michael Stonebraker, Turing Award winner; founder of many database companies, including Ingres Corporation, Illustra, Paradigm4, StreamBase Systems, Tamr, Vertica and VoltDB; served as chief technical officer of Informix
- James W. Thatcher, winner of ACM SIG Access Award (2008), for Outstanding Contributions to Computing and Accessibility for his contributions to digital accessibility
- Louise Trevillyan, 2012 ACM SIGDA Pioneering Achievement Award
- Eugene C. Whitney, IEEE Fellow and a member of the IEEE Rotating Machinery, Synchronous and the Power Generation Hydraulic subcommittees
- W. Rae Young, named an IEEE Fellow in 1964 "for contributions to mobile radio and data communications systems"
- Bernard P. Zeigler, IEEE Fellow in recognition of his contributions to the theory of discrete event simulation
- Xi Zhang, IEEE Fellow

== Criminals, murderers, and infamous newsmakers ==
- Hawley Harvey Crippen (MED: 1882), infamous murderer; homeopath, ear and eye specialist and medicine dispenser;hanged in 1910 in Pentonville Prison in London, England, for the murder of his wife Cora Henrietta Crippen
- François Duvalier (Public Health, 1944–45), repressive dictator of Haiti, excommunicated from the Catholic Church; estimates of those killed by his regime are as high as 30,000
- H. H. Holmes (MED: MD 1884), born Herman Webster Mudgett, 19th-century serial killer; one of the first documented American serial killers; confessed to 27 murders, of which nine were confirmed; actual body count could be as high as 250; took an unknown number of his victims from the 1893 World's Columbian Exposition; his story was novelized by Erik Larson in his 2003 book The Devil in the White City
- Theodore Kaczynski (M.A.; Ph.D. 1967), better known as the Unabomber, one of UM's most promising mathematicians; earned his Ph.D. by solving, in less than a year, a math problem that his advisor had been unable to solve; abandoned his career to engage in a mail bombing campaign
- Jack Kevorkian (MED: MD Pathology 1952), guilty of second-degree homicide after committing voluntary euthanasia by administering a lethal injection to Thomas Youk; spent eight years in prison
- Nathan F. Leopold, Jr., thrill killer of Leopold and Loeb, transferred from Michigan in 1922 to the University of Chicago, before murdering 14-year-old Robert "Bobby" Franks
- John List, murderer and fugitive for eighteen years; caught after being featured in America's Most Wanted, died in prison
- Richard A. Loeb (BA 1923), thrill killer of Leopold and Loeb, youngest graduate in the University of Michigan's history, murdered 14-year-old Robert "Bobby" Franks
- Larry Nassar (1985), US national team doctor who sexually assaulted approximately 250 people

== "Father of..." ==
- John Jacob Abel (PHARM: Ph.D. 1883), North American "father of pharmacology"
- Leon Jacob Cole (June 1, 1877 – February 17, 1948), geneticist and ornithologist; "father of American bird banding"
- George Dantzig (MA Math 1937), "father of linear programming"; studied at UM under T.H. Hildebrandt, R.L. Wilder, and G.Y. Rainich
- Tony Fadell (COE: BSE CompE 1991), "father of the Apple iPod"; created all five generations of the iPod and the Apple iSight camera
- Moses Gomberg (February 8, 1866 – February 12, 1947), chemistry professor at the University of Michigan; "father of radical chemistry"
- Saul Hertz, M.D. (April 20, 1905 – July 28, 1950), physician who devised the medical uses of radioactive iodine; pioneered the first targeted cancer therapies; "father of the field of theranostics", combining diagnostic imaging with therapy in a single chemical substance
- Ellis R. Kerley (September 1, 1924 – September 3, 1998), anthropologist, and pioneer in the field of forensic anthropology
- Samuel Kirk (1904–1996), psychologist and educator recognized for his accomplishments in the field of special education; "father of special education"
- Chris Langton (Ph.D.), computer science; "father of artificial life"; founder of the Swarm Corporation; distinguished expellee of the Santa Fe Institute
- Li Shouheng (Chinese: 李寿恒; pinyin: Lǐ Shòuhéng; 1898–1995), also known as S. H. Li, Chinese educator, chemist and chemical engineer; founded the first chemical engineering department in China; "father of modern Chinese chemical engineering"
- Theodore C. Lyster, M.D. (10 July 1875 – 5 August 1933), United States Army physician and aviation medicine pioneer; "father of aviation medicine"
- Sid Meier, "father of computer gaming"; created games Civilization, Pirates!, Railroad Tycoon, SimGolf
- Daniel Okrent (BA 1969), public editor of New York Times; editor-at-large of Time Inc.; Pulitzer Prize finalist in history (Great Fortune, 2004); founding father of Rotisserie League Baseball
- Oyekunle Ayinde "Kunle" Olukotun, Cadence Design Systems Professor in the Stanford School of Engineering, professor of Electrical Engineering and Computer Science at Stanford University and the director of the Stanford Pervasive Parallelism Lab; "father of the multi-core processor"
- Robert E. Park, acknowledged as "father of human ecology" by Emory S. Bogardus: "Not only did he coin the name but he laid out the patterns, offered the earliest exhibit of ecological concepts, defined the major ecological processes and stimulated more advanced students to cultivate the fields of research in ecology than most other sociologists combined."
- Raymond Pearl, biologist, one of the founders of biogerontology
- John Clark Salyer II, attended the University of Michigan where he received his MS in 1930; for his efforts as head of the Division of Wildlife Refuges, has become known as "father of the National Wildlife Refuge System"
- Claude Shannon (April 30, 1916 – February 24, 2001), mathematician, electrical engineer, and cryptographer; "father of information theory" and "father of digital circuit design theory"
- Richard Errett Smalley (June 6, 1943 – October 28, 2005), Gene and Norman Hackerman Professor of Chemistry and a professor of Physics and Astronomy at Rice University; upon his death, the US Senate passed a resolution to honor Smalley, crediting him as the "father of nanotechnology"
- William A. Starrett, Jr. (June 14, 1877 – March 25, 1932), builder and architect of skyscrapers; best known as the builder of the Empire State Building in New York City; "father of the skyscraper"
- Larry Teal (March 26, 1905 - July 11, 1984), considered by many to be the father of American orchestral saxophone
- Olke Uhlenbeck, biochemist, known for his work in RNA biochemistry and RNA catalysis; completed his undergraduate degree at the University of Michigan at Ann Arbor in 1964; "father of RNA"
- Mark Weiser (July 23, 1952 – April 27, 1999), computer scientist and chief technology officer (CTO) at Xerox PARC; "father of ubiquitous computing"
- Wu Ta-You (simplified Chinese: 吴大猷; traditional Chinese: 吳大猷; pinyin: Wú Dàyóu) (September 27, 1907 – March 4, 2000), Chinese physicist and writer who worked in the United States, Canada, mainland China and Taiwan; "father of Chinese physics"

== Founders and co-founders ==
- The Admiral Group was founded by Henry Engelhardt (B.A.), chief executive of Admiral Group, a British motor insurance company and English billionaire.
- Adobe Photoshop was founded by Thomas Knoll (COE).
- On Apollo 15, the all-Michigan crew of Alfred Worden, David Scott (attended two years and later received honorary degree), and James Irwin left a 45-word plaque on the moon in 1971, founding its own chapter of the University of Michigan Alumni Association on the moon.
- Bain Capital was co-founded by founding partner Edward Conard (BSE 1978),
- A co-founder and first president of the Boeing Company, Edgar Nathaniel Gott (May 2, 1887 – July 17, 1947) was an early American aviation industry executive and a senior executive of several aircraft companies, including Fokker and Consolidated Aircraft.
- Borders was co-founded by Louis Borders (BA 1969) and his brother Tom Borders (MA 1966).
- The Buffalo Bills, a team in the National Football League (NFL), were founded by Ralph Wilson (LAW: attended).
- Leo Burnett Company was founded by Leo Burnett (BA 1914), journalism and advertising pioneer.
- C-SPAN was co-founded by John D. Evans.
- Domino's Pizza was co-founded by Tom Monaghan.
- DoubleClick Inc. was co-founded by Kevin O'Connor (COE: BSE EE 1983).
- EQ Office, a real estate development firm, was founded by Samuel Zell (LAW: AB 1963, JD 1966).
- Edwin Francis Gay was a founding member of the Council on Foreign Relations.
- General Motors was co-founded in 1908 by Frederic Latta Smith. Smith was also one of the founders of the Olds Motor Works in 1899.
- Google was co-founded by Larry Page (COE).
- Groupon was co-founded by Brad Keywell (BUS: BBA 1991; LAW: JD 1993), principal of Groupon.
- H&R Block Inc. was co-founded by Henry W. Bloch (BS 1944).
- Haworth, Inc., a manufacturer of office environments, grew from a garage-shop venture in 1948 to a $1.4 billion global corporation and was co-founded by Gerrard Wendell "(G.W.)" Haworth.
- LexION Capital Management was co-founded by Elle Kaplan (BA), CEO.
- Merrill Lynch was co-founded by Charles Edward Merrill (attended law school 1906–1907, but did not graduate).
- The National Baseball Seminar was founded by Bill Gamson. When he moved to the University of Michigan in 1962, he recruited about 25 people to his game, including Robert Sklar, a history professor. In 1968, Professor Sklar mentioned it to Daniel Okrent, a student he was advising. A decade later, Okrent invented the more complex Rotisserie League Baseball, which lets its "owners" make in-season trades; it is considered the closest ancestor to today's billion-dollar fantasy sports industry.
- Redbox was founded by Gregg Kaplan, who is also the founder of Modjule LLC, and the former president and COO of Coinstar.
- The Related Group was founded by Stephen M. Ross (BUS: BBA 1962), real estate developer.
- Saba Capital Management was founded by hedge fund manager Boaz Weinstein (BA 1995), who specialized in credit derivatives trading.
- Science Applications International Corporation was founded by J. Robert Beyster (COE: BSE, MS, Ph.D.), scientist and entrepreneur.
- The co-founder of Scientific Games Corporation is John Koza (MA Mathematics 1966; BA 1964, MS 1966, Ph.D. 1972 Computer Science), venture capitalist who co-invented the scratch-off instant lottery ticket.
- Lockheed's Skunk Works was founded by Kelly Johnson (COE).
- Stryker Corporation, a medical device company, was founded by Dr. Homer Stryker (MED: M.D. 1925; D. 1980).
- Syntel was founded by Indian billionaire Bharat Desai (BUS: MBA 1981), its president and CEO.
- The founder and CEO of Uptake Technologies, an industrial AI software provider, is Brad Keywell (BUS: BBA 1991; LAW: JD 1993), serial entrepreneur.
- Wasserstein Perella & Co. was co-founded by Bruce Wasserstein (AB 1967), CEO of Lazard Freres.

== Educators ==
- Frank Aarebrot, professor of comparative politics at University of Bergen
- Ida Louise Altman (A.B.), author of Emigrants and Society
- Edgardo J. Angara (LAW: LLM 1964), secretary of agriculture (emeritus) and former executive secretary of the Philippines
- W. Brian Arthur (MA 1969), Lagrange Prize in Complexity Science 2008; Schumpeter Prize in Economics 1990; Guggenheim Fellow 1987–88; fellow of the Econometric Society
- John "Jack" William Atkinson (Ph.D. 1950), psychologist who pioneered the scientific study of human motivation, achievement and behavior
- Henry Moore Bates (Ph.B. 1890), dean of the University of Michigan Law School (1910–1939); fellow of the American Academy of Arts and Sciences
- William J. Beal (A.B. 1859, A.M. 1862); namesake of W. J. Beal Botanical Garden
- Mitchell N. Berman, professor of law at the University of Pennsylvania Law School
- Mary Frances Berry, Geraldine R. Segal Professor of American Social Thought, professor of history at the University of Pennsylvania; Civil Rights Commissioner, 1980–2004
- Lewis Binford Ph.D., archaeologist most known for his role in establishing the "New Archaeology" movement of the 1960s
- Frank Nelson Blanchard (Ph.D. 1919), herpetologist and professor of zoology at the University of Michigan
- Elise M. Boulding (Ph.D.), educator and author in the field of Peace & Conflict Studies
- George W. Breslauer (A.B., A.M., Ph.D.), political science professor and Russia specialist at the University of California, Berkeley; Berkeley's executive vice chancellor and provost
- Allen Britton (Ph.D. 1949), music educator; former president of Music Educators National Conference
- Urie Bronfenbrenner (Ph.D. 1942), helped create the federal Head Start program; credited with creating the interdisciplinary field of human ecology
- Frederic G. Cassidy (Ph.D. 1938), editor-in-chief of the Dictionary of American Regional English from 1962 to his death in 2000
- June Rose Colby (Ph.D. 1886), professor of literature 1892–1931; first woman at the University of Michigan to receive a Ph.D. by examination
- Katharine Coman (AB 1880), social activist and economist; specialized in the development of the American West; professor of history 1883–1900; chaired the Economics Department; dean of Wellesley College, which named a professorship in her honor
- Charles Horton Cooley (BA 1887; Ph.D. 1894), sociologist, most known for his concept of the "looking glass self", which expanded William James's idea of self to include the capacity of reflection on one's own behavior
- Natalie Zemon Davis (Ph.D. 1959) CC, Canadian and American historian of the early modern period; awarded the 2010 Holberg International Memorial Prize, worth 4.5 million Norwegian kroner (~$700,000 US), for her narrative approach to the field of history
- Bueno de Mesquita (Ph.D. 1971), political scientist and game theoretician
- N. L. Dillard (master's 1942), educator and principal of Caswell County Training School (later Caswell County High School)
- Paul Dressel (Ph.D.), founding director of Michigan State University's Counseling Center
- James Stemble Duesenberry, economist; made a significant contribution to the Keynesian analysis of income and employment with his 1949 doctoral thesis "Income, Saving and the Theory of Consumer Behavior'
- Aaron Dworkin (A.B. 1997, M.M. 1998), 2005 MacArthur Fellow; founder and president of Detroit-based Sphinx Organization, which strives to increase the number of African-Americans and Latinos having careers in classical music
- W. Ralph Eubanks (M.A.), author, journalist, professor, public speaker, business executive, Guggenheim award winner
- David Fasenfest (Ph.D. 1984), associate professor of Sociology at Wayne State University
- Heidi Li Feldman (J.D. 1990; Ph.D. 1993), law professor
- Sidney Fine, professor of history at Michigan
- Neil Foley (Ph.D.), historian, Guggenheim award winner
- Floyd J. Fowler, Jr. (M.A.1962; Ph.D. 1966), researcher, academic, author and senior research fellow at Center for Survey Research at the University of Massachusetts Boston
- Joseph S. Freedman (Masters of Information and Library Science 1990), professor of education at Alabama State University
- Vivian Gadsden (EdD, 1988), psychologist at the University of Pennsylvania
- Helen Beulah Thompson Gaige (1890–1976), herpetologist, curator of Reptiles and Amphibians for the Museum of Zoology at the University of Michigan and specialist in neotropical frogs
- Edwin Francis Gay (AB 1890), first dean of Harvard Business School, 1908–1919
- C. Lee Giles (M.S.), David Reese Professor of Information Sciences and Technology, professor of Computer Science and Engineering, professor of Supply Chain and Information Systems, Pennsylvania State University; fellow of the ACM, IEEE and INNS
- Deborah Gross (BS 1975), professor of nursing at Johns Hopkins School of Nursing
- Roy Grow, Kellogg Professor of International Relations, director of the International Relations program at Carleton College; his specialty is the political economy of East Asia, specifically China and Southeast Asia
- Jack Guttenberg, professor of law at Capital University Law School
- Shelley Haley, professor of Classics and Africana Studies at Hamilton College
- Alice Hamilton (MED: MD 1893), toxicologist; scientist; first female faculty member at Harvard Medical School
- Ann Tukey Harrison (BA 1957, PhD 1962), professor of French language and literature and Michigan State University
- Elaine Catherine Hatfield (BA), professor of psychology at the University of Hawaii; earned Ph.D. at Stanford; scholar who pioneered the scientific study of passionate love and sexual desire
- Jessica Hellmann (B.S.), professor of Ecology at the University of Minnesota
- Clark Leonard Hull (M.A.), psychologist
- Lyman T. Johnson (AM 1931), the grandson of slaves; successfully sued to integrate the University of Kentucky, opening that state's colleges and universities to African-Americans five years before the landmark Brown v. Board of Education ruling
- Michael P. Johnson (Ph.D. 1974), emeritus professor of sociology, Pennsylvania State University
- Rosabeth Moss Kanter (MA 1965, Ph.D. 1967), first tenured female professor at Harvard Business School
- Roberta Karmel (born 1937), Centennial Professor of Law at Brooklyn Law School, and first female Commissioner of the U.S. Securities and Exchange Commission
- Nafe Katter (BA, MA, PhD), professor of theatre at the University of Connecticut and frequent stage actor and director
- Alexandra Killewald (BA, MA, PhD), professor of sociology at the Harvard Kennedy School
- Mark Kilstofte (D.M.A. 1992), composer; professor at Furman University, Greenville, South Carolina; Guggenheim award winner
- George Kish (Ph.D.), cartographer
- George Knepper, historian
- Yanna Krupnikov, political scientist
- John E. Laird (B.S. 1975), computer scientist
- Edgar Lane (Ph.D. 1949), professor of political science University of California Santa Barbara and author
- Thomas A. LaVeist (MA 1985, PhD 1988, PDF 1990), dean and Weatherhead Presidential Chair in Health Equity at Tulane University School of Public Health & Tropical Medicine
- Stanley Lebergott (BA, MA), former government economist; Wesleyan University professor
- Rensis Likert (BA 1926 in Sociology and Economics), founder of the University of Michigan Institute for Social Research and the director from its inception in 1946–1970
- Lynda Lisabeth, professor in the school of Public Health of Michigan University
- Howard Markel (A.B., English Literature, 1982; M.D., 1986), George E. Wantz Distinguished Professor of the History of Medicine at the University of Michigan, Guggenheim Fellow, Member of the National Academy of Medicine, author, pediatrician, medical journalist
- William McAndrew (B.A., Literature, 1886), superintendent of Chicago Public Schools
- Nina McClelland (PhD., 1968), dean emeritus and former professor of chemistry at the University of Toledo, fellow of the American Chemical Society
- Paul Robert Milgrom (A.B. 1970), economist
- Martha Minow (LS&A: A.B. 1975), named dean of Harvard Law School in 2009
- James Moeser (Ph.D. 1967), ninth chancellor of the University of North Carolina at Chapel Hill, 2000–present
- Mayo Moran (LAW: LLM 1992), named dean of the University of Toronto Faculty of Law in 2005
- Marjorie Hope Nicolson (A.B. 1914), first female president of Phi Beta Kappa, Guggenheim award winner
- Eugene A. Nida (Ph.D.), linguist, developer of the dynamic-equivalence Bible-translation theory
- Nicholas Nixon (BA 1969), photographer, known for portraiture and documentary photography, and for championing the use of the 8x10 inch view camera; Guggenheim award winner
- Mary Beth Norton (BA 1964), American historian; Mary Donlon Alger Professor of American History, Department of History at Cornell University; Guggenheim award winner
- Norman Ornstein (MA Political Science, PhD 1974 Political Science), scholar at Center for Advanced Study in the Behavioral Sciences, Stanford University
- Scott E. Page (BA 1985), social scientist
- Clara Claiborne Park (1923–2010), instructor at Williams College; author; raised awareness of autism
- Michael Posner (PhD), psychologist; winner of the National Medal of Science
- Sanjay Raman (PhD EE 1998), dean of the University of Massachusetts Amherst College of Engineering
- Irmengard Rauch (Ph.D. in 1962), professor emerita of Germanic linguistics at University of California, Berkeley
- John Oren Reed (1856–1916), Ph.D. at Jena (1897); professor of physics
- Shai Reshef (M.A.) (Hebrew: שי רשף), Israeli businessman; educational entrepreneur; founder and president of University of the People, a non-profit, tuition-free, online academic institution dedicated to the democratization of higher education
- John Ruhl (BS Physics 1987), professor of physics at UCSB and Case Western Reserve University; primary investigator of the ACBAR, Boomerang, South Pole Telescope, and Spider Telescope projects; author of Princeton Problems in Physics
- Lucy Maynard Salmon (BA 1876, M.A. 1883), American historian; professor of history, Vassar College, 1889–1927; member of the American Historical Association's Committee of Seven
- Floyd VanNest Schultz (Ph.D. EE 1950), Educator and Electrical Engineering Scientist
- Robert Scott (LAW: SJD 1973), dean of University of Virginia School of Law 1991–2000
- Wilfrid Sellars (BA 1933), philosopher and Rhodes Scholar
- Holly Martin Smith, distinguished professor of philosophy at Rutgers University
- Claude Steiner (Ph.D. 1965), founding member and teaching fellow of the International Transactional Analysis Association
- Clarence Stephens (Pd.D.); the teaching techniques he introduced at Potsdam, and earlier at Morgan State, have been adopted by many mathematics departments across the country
- George Sugihara (B.S. 1973), theoretical biologist; has worked across a wide variety of fields, including landscape ecology, algebraic topology, algal physiology and paleoecology, neurobiology, atmospheric science, fisheries science, and quantitative finance
- Leonard Suransky, winner of the Des Lee Visiting Lectureship in Global Awareness at Webster University
- Ebony Elizabeth Thomas (Ph.D. 2010), writer and educator
- G. David Tilman (Ph.D. 1976), ecologist, Guggenheim award winner
- Elsie Toles (B.A.), Arizona's superintendent of public instruction, professor, and author
- Amos Tversky (Ph.D. 1965), long-time collaborator with Daniel Kahneman; co-founder of prospect theory in economics; died of cancer before Kahneman received the Nobel prize and was featured prominently and fondly in his Nobel speech
- Zalman Usiskin (Ph.D.), educator; Director of the University of Chicago School Mathematics Project
- Robert W. Vishny (AB, highest distinction, 1981), economist and the Eric J. Gleacher Distinguished Service Professor of Finance at the University of Chicago Graduate School of Business; prominent representative of the school of behavioural finance; his research papers (many written jointly with Andrei Shleifer, Rafael LaPorta and Josef Lakonishok) are among the most often cited recent research works in the field of economic sciences
- Duncan Waite, professor of education and community leadership
- Robert M. Warner (MA 1953, Ph.D.), dean emeritus, University of Michigan's School of Information (the former School of Library Science) 1985–92; professor emeritus of the School of Information; appointed sixth archivist of the United States in July 1980 by President Jimmy Carter; continued to serve under President Ronald Reagan through April 15, 1985
- Bret Weinstein (MA, Ph.D. 2009), professor at Evergreen State College until 2017
- David E. Weinstein (LS&A: MA 1988, Ph.D. 1991), Carl Sumner Shoup Professor of the Japanese Economy at Columbia University; contributed to new understanding of variety gains from international trade; expert on the Japanese economy; Research Director of the Japan Project at the National Bureau of Economic Research; Member of the Council on Foreign Relations; Member of the Federal Economic Statistics Advisory Committee
- Albert H. Wheeler (SPH: Ph.D.), life-sciences professor and politician in Ann Arbor; the city's first African-American mayor, 1975–1978; became assistant professor of microbiology and immunology at Michigan in 1952; eventually became the university's first tenured African-American professor
- Lora Wildenthal (Ph.D. 1994), professor of history at Rice University
- David R. Williams (LSA: MA 1984; Ph.D. 1986), professor of Public Health and professor of African and African American Studies and of Sociology at Harvard University
- Phyllis Wise (M.S. 1969, Ph.D. 1972), University of Washington provost or Chief Academic officer; manages $3 billion annual budget
- Frank Wu (LAW: JD 1991), named dean of Hastings Law School in 2009

=== University presidents ===
- Theophilus C. Abbot (LL.D. 1890), third president of Michigan State University
- Charles Kendall Adams (1861, 1862), historian; second president of Cornell University (1885–1892); president of the University of Wisconsin (1892–1902)
- Dr. Khaled S. Al-Sultan (MS, applied mathematics; COE: Ph.D. in IOE), third rector of King Fahd University for Petroleum and Minerals, a public university in Dhahran, Saudi Arabia
- James Rowland Angell (BA 1890), tenth president of Yale University
- Charles E. Bayless (MBA), president of West Virginia University Institute of Technology
- Warren E. Bow (M.A.), president of Wayne State University
- Detlev Bronk (Ph.D. 1926), scientist, educator, and administrator; credited with establishing biophysics as a recognized discipline; president of Johns Hopkins; president of the Rockefeller University 1953–1968
- Stratton D. Brooks (BA 1896), president of the University of Oklahoma and the University of Missouri
- Gaylen J. Byker (LAW: JD), president of Calvin College; Offshore Energy Development Corporation Partners
- William Wallace Campbell (COE: BSE 1886), astronomer; tenth president of the University of California (1923–30); elected president of the National Academy of Sciences in 1931er, head of Dev
- Benjamin Cluff (B.A.), first president of Brigham Young University; the school's third principal
- Joanne V. Creighton (Ph.D. in English literature), 17th president of Mount Holyoke College in South Hadley, Massachusetts; provost and professor of English 1990–1994 at Wesleyan University; Wesleyan's interim president 1994–1995
- James Danko (MBA), appointed 21st president of Butler University in 2011
- Phyllis Worthy Dawkins (MA), 18th president of Bennett College 2017–2019, acting president Cheyney University of Pennsylvania 2014
- John DiBiaggio (MA), president, University of Connecticut 1979–1985, Michigan State University 1985–1992, Tufts University 1992–2001
- Saul Fenster (Ph.D., 1959), 6th president of New Jersey Institute of Technology 1978–2002
- Lewis Ransom Fiske (A.B. 1850; A.M.; LL.D. 1879), second president of the Agricultural College of the State of Michigan (now Michigan State University) 1859–1862; president of Albion College 1877–1898
- Deborah Freund (MPH, MA, Ph.D.), president of Claremont Graduate University
- David Friday, president of the U.S. state of Michigan's Michigan Agricultural College (now Michigan State University), 1922–1923; graduate of the University of Michigan
- Allan Gilmour (MBA), inaugurated as 11th president of Wayne State University in 2011
- Domenico Grasso (Ph.D. 1987), Sixth Chancellor of University of Michigan-Dearborn
- Thomas J. Haas, president, Grand Valley State University
- Eugene Habecker (Ph.D.), 30th president of Taylor University
- William W. Hagerty (COE:M.S. 1943, Ph.D. 1947), former president of Drexel University
- Harry Burns Hutchins; fourth president of the University of Michigan (1909–1920); organized and led the law department at Cornell University 1887–1894
- Mark Kennedy, businessman, politician, and administrator currently serving as the president of the University of Colorado (CU) system; served as 12th president of the University of North Dakota
- Raynard S. Kington (MED), former deputy director of the National Institutes of Health; 13th president of Grinnell College; earned medical degree from the University of Michigan at age 21
- Bradford Knapp, president of the Alabama Polytechnic Institute, now known as Auburn University, 1928–1933
- Kathy Krendl, president, Otterbein College (Ohio)
- James Raymond Lawson (Ph.D.), president, Fisk University (1967–1975)
- Jeffrey S. Lehman (LAW: JD 1977), 11th president of Cornell University (2003–2005)
- Wallace D. Loh (Ph.D.), president of University of Maryland
- Maud Mandel, professor of History and Judaic Studies and dean of the college at Brown University; president of Williams College
- Harriet Nembhard (COE: Ph.D.), dean of the University of Iowa College of Engineering and the Roy J. Carver Professor of Industrial and Systems Engineering; president of Harvey Mudd College in Claremont, California
- Carroll Vincent Newsom (1904–1990), educator who served as the eleventh NYU President
- Moses Ochonu, professor of African History at Vanderbilt University
- Alice Elvira Freeman Palmer (A.B. 1876, Ph.D. Hon 1882), appointed head of the history department at Wellesley College in 1879; named the acting president of Wellesley in 1881; became its president in 1882
- Constantine Papadakis (Ph.D.), Drexel University president 1995–2009
- William H. Payne (1836–1907), chancellor of the University of Nashville and president of Peabody College (both of which later merged with Vanderbilt University), 1887–1901
- Scott Ransom, president, University of North Texas Health Science Center
- William Craig Rice, president, Shimer College
- Henry Wade Rogers (BA, MA), president of Northwestern University 1890–1900
- Jonathan Rosenbaum, president of Gratz College
- Alexander Grant Ruthven (Ph.D. 1906); president of the University of Michigan
- Austin Scott, tenth president of Rutgers College (now Rutgers University), 1891–1906
- Jane Slocum (LL.B. 1874), educator, lecturer
- William Spoelhof (MA 1937), president of Calvin College 1951–76; namesake of Asteroid 129099 Spoelhof
- Rudolf Steinberg, president of the Johann Wolfgang Goethe University in Frankfurt, 2000–2008
- Carl Strikwerda (Ph.D.), William & Mary's Dean of the Faculty of Arts & Sciences; named 14th president of Elizabethtown College in Pennsylvania in 2011
- Beverly Daniel Tatum, president, Spelman College
- Charles M. Vest, president, National Academy of Engineering; former president, MIT
- B. Joseph White (BUS: Ph.D. 1975), 16th president of the University of Illinois
- Jerome Wiesner (COE: BS 1937, MS 1938, Ph.D. 1950), MIT provost 1968–1971; president of MIT, 1971–1980
- Edwin Willits (A.B. 1855), the first assistant U.S. secretary of agriculture under Norman Jay Coleman for Grover Cleveland's first administration; 4th president of Michigan Agricultural College
- Richard F. Wilson (ED 1978), president, Illinois Wesleyan University

== Food ==
- Rick Bayless (doctoral student, linguistics), chef who specializes in traditional Mexican cuisine with modern interpretations; known for his PBS series Mexico: One Plate at a Time
- David Burtka, actor and professional chef
- Gael Greene, food critic, said to have coined the word "foodie"
- Gabrielle Hamilton, chef, author, winner of James Beard Award
- Stephanie Izard, chef residing in Chicago, Illinois, first female chef to win Bravo's Top Chef
- Sara Moulton (AB 1974), executive chef of Gourmet magazine; former host of the Food Network shows Sara's Secrets and Cooking Live
- Joan Nathan, executive producer and host of Jewish Cooking in America with Joan Nathan
- Ruth Reichl food writer, chef, critic and winner of four James Beard Awards

== Guggenheim fellows ==
As of 2021, Michigan alumni include over 145 Guggenheim Fellows.

- Richard Newbold Adams (August 4, 1924 – September 11, 2018), anthropologist
- Thomas R. Adams (May 22, 1921 – December 1, 2008), librarian of the John Carter Brown Library and John Hay Professor of Bibliography and University Bibliographer at Brown University
- Ricardo Ainslie, Mexican-American documentary filmmaker
- John Richard Alden (23 January 1908 – 14 August 1991), American historian and author of books on the era of the American Revolutionary War
- W. Brian Arthur (born 31 July 1945), economist credited with developing the modern approach to increasing returns
- John William Atkinson (December 31, 1923 – October 27, 2003), also known as Jack Atkinson, psychologist who pioneered the scientific study of human motivation, achievement and behavior
- Dean Bakopoulos, writer, born in Dearborn Heights, Michigan in 1975; two-time National Endowment for the Arts fellow, a Guggenheim Fellow, and writer-in-residence at Grinnell College
- John Bargh (born 1955), social psychologist currently working at Yale University
- Leslie Bassett, composer of classical music
- Richard Bauman, folklorist and anthropologist, now retired from Indiana University Bloomington; distinguished professor emeritus of folklore, of anthropology, and of communication and culture
- Warren Benson (January 26, 1924 – October 6, 2005), composer, mostly of music for wind instruments and percussion
- Theodore H. Berlin (8 May 1917 – 16 November 1962), theoretical physicist
- Derek Bermel (born 1967), composer, clarinetist and conductor
- Robert Berner (November 25, 1935 – January 10, 2015), scientist known for his contributions to the modeling of the carbon cycle
- Sara Berry (born 1940), scholar of contemporary African political economies, professor of history at Johns Hopkins University, co-founder of the Center for Africana Studies at Johns Hopkins
- Lawrence D. Bobo, W. E. B. Du Bois Professor of the Social Sciences and dean of Social Science at Harvard University
- Kevin Boyle (born 7 October 1960), author and the William Smith Mason Professor of American History at Northwestern University
- Bertrand Harris Bronson (June 22, 1902 – March 14, 1986), academic and professor in the English department at the University of California, Berkeley
- Clair Alan Brown (August 16, 1903 – March 24, 1982), botanist
- Roger Brown (April 14, 1925 – December 11, 1997), psychologist, known for his work in social psychology and in children's language development
- Eugene Burnstein, social psychologist and professor emeritus of psychology at the University of Michigan College of Literature, Science, and the Arts
- John W. Cahn, scientist, recipient of the 1998 National Medal of Science
- David George Campbell (born January 28, 1949), educator, ecologist, environmentalist, and award-winning author of non-fiction
- Victoria Chang, poet and children's writer
- Patricia Cheng (born 1952), Chinese-American psychologist
- Laura Clayton (born December 8, 1943), pianist and composer
- Allan M. Collins, cognitive scientist, professor emeritus of Learning Sciences at Northwestern University's School of Education and Social Policy
- Philip Converse (November 17, 1928 – December 30, 2014), political scientist
- Richard M. Cook, academic who specializes in American literature
- Harold Courlander (September 18, 1908 – March 15, 1996), novelist, folklorist, and anthropologist and expert in the study of Haitian life
- Olena Kalytiak Davis (born September 16, 1963), poet
- Philip James DeVries (born March 7, 1952), tropical biologist whose research focuses on insect ecology and evolution, especially butterflies
- Charles L. Dolph (August 27, 1918 – June 1, 1994), professor of mathematics, known for research in applied mathematics and engineering
- William Doppmann (October 10, 1934 – January 27, 2013), concert pianist and composer
- William H. Durham, biological anthropologist and evolutionary biologist; Bing Professor Emeritus in Human Biology at Stanford University
- W. Ralph Eubanks (born June 25, 1957), author, journalist, professor, public speaker, and business executive
- Avard Fairbanks (March 2, 1897 – January 1, 1987), 20th-century sculptor
- Ada Ferrer, Cuban-American historian; Julius Silver Professor of History and Latin American Studies at New York University; Pulitzer Prize for History award recipient
- Sidney Fine (October 11, 1920 – March 31, 2009), professor of history at the University of Michigan
- Neil Foley, historian
- Gabriela Lena Frank (born September 1972), pianist and composer of contemporary classical music
- Steven Frank (born 1957), professor of biology at the University of California, Irvine
- William Frankena (June 21, 1908 – October 22, 1994), moral philosopher
- Ronald Freedman, international demographer and founder of the Population Studies Center at the University of Michigan
- Douglas J. Futuyma (born 24 April 1942), evolutionary biologist
- Neal Gabler (born 1950), journalist, writer and film critic
- Mary Gaitskill (born November 11, 1954), novelist, essayist, and short story writer
- David Gale, mathematician and economist
- William A. Gamson, professor of sociology at Boston College, where he was also the co-director of the Media Research and Action Project
- Seymour Ginsburg (December 12, 1927 – December 5, 2004), pioneer of automata theory, formal language theory, and database theory, and computer science
- Charles R. Goldman (born 9 November 1930), limnologist and ecologist
- Francisco Goldman (born 1954), novelist, journalist, and Allen K. Smith Professor of Literature and Creative Writing, Trinity College
- Leslie D. Gottlieb (1936–2012), biologist described by the Botanical Society of America as "one of the most influential plant evolutionary biologists over the past several decades"
- Josh Greenfeld, author and screenwriter mostly known for his screenplay for the 1974 film Harry and Tonto along with Paul Mazursky
- Gwendolyn Midlo Hall (born June 27, 1929), historian, focuses on the history of slavery in the Caribbean, Latin America, Louisiana, Africa, and the African diaspora in the Americas
- Amy Harmon, journalist
- Joel F. Harrington (born August 25, 1959), historian of pre-modern Germany; Centennial Professor of History at Vanderbilt University
- Donald Harris (April 7, 1931 – March 29, 2016), composer, taught music at the Ohio State University for 22 years, dean of the College of the Arts 1988–1997
- Garrett Hongo (born May 30, 1951), Yonsei, fourth-generation Japanese American academic and poet
- Joseph Hickey (16 April 1907 - 31 August 1993), ornithologist who wrote the landmark Guide to Bird Watching
- Isabel V. Hull (born 1949), John Stambaugh Professor Emerita of History and the former chair of the history department at Cornell University
- Philip Strong Humphrey (26 February 1926 – 13 November 2009), ornithologist, museum curator, and professor of zoology
- M. Kent Jennings (born 1934), political scientist best known for his path-breaking work on the patterns and development of political preferences and behaviors among young Americans
- Lawrence Joseph (born 1948), poet, writer, essayist, critic, lawyer, and professor of law
- James B. Kaler (born December 29, 1938), astronomer and science writer
- Rosabeth Moss Kanter (born March 15, 1943), Ernest L. Arbuckle professor of business at Harvard Business School
- Laura Kasischke (born 1961), fiction writer and poet; best known for the novels Suspicious River, The Life Before Her Eyes and White Bird in a Blizzard
- Mike Kelley (October 27, 1954 – c. January 31, 2012), artist
- Aviva Kempner (born December 23, 1946), filmmaker
- X. J. Kennedy (born Joseph Charles Kennedy; August 21, 1929 – January 30, 2026), poet, translator, anthologist, editor, and author of children's literature and textbooks on English literature and poetry
- James Stark Koehler (10 November 1914 – 19 June 2006), physicist, specializing in metal defects and their interactions; known for the eponymous Peach-Koehler stress formula
- Timothy Kramer (born 1959), composer whose music has earned him a Fulbright Scholarship, an NEA grant, and a Guggenheim Fellowship
- Edward Kravitz (born December 19, 1932), George Packer Berry Professor of Neurobiology at Harvard Medical School
- Armin Landeck (1905–1984), printmaker and educator
- Chihchun Chi-sun Lee (Chinese: 李志純; Pe̍h-ōe-jī: Lí Chì-sûn; Pinyin: Li Zhìchún, born 1970), composer of contemporary classical music
- Otis Hamilton Lee (28 September 1902 – 17 September 1948), philosopher; Guggenheim Fellow
- Normand Lockwood (March 19, 1906 – March 9, 2002), composer
- Alvin D. Loving Jr. (September 19, 1935 – June 21, 2005), better known as Al Loving, abstract expressionist painter
- Mary Lum (born 1951), visual artist
- Suzanne McClelland, New York-based artist known for abstract work based in language, speech, and sound
- Jay Meek (1937 – November 3, 2007), poet, and director of the Creative Writing program at the University of North Dakota
- Jonathan Metzl (born December 12, 1964), psychiatrist and author
- Nancy Milford (born March 26, 1938), biographer
- Harvey Alfred Miller (October 19, 1928 – January 7, 2020), botanist, specializing in Pacific Islands bryophytes
- Susan Montgomery (born 2 April 1943), mathematician whose current research interests concern noncommutative algebras
- Howard Markel (born April 23, 1960), physician and medical historian
- George H. Miley (born 1933), professor emeritus of physics from the University of Illinois at Urbana–Champaign
- Christine Montross (born 1973), medical doctor and writer
- Paul M. Naghdi (March 29, 1924 – July 9, 1994), professor of mechanical engineering at University of California, Berkeley
- Homer Neal (June 13, 1942 – May 23, 2018), particle physicist and a distinguished professor at the University of Michigan
- Marjorie Hope Nicolson, literary scholar
- Harald Herborg Nielsen (January 25, 1903 – January 8, 1973), physicist
- Nicholas Nixon (born October 27, 1947), photographer, known for his work in portraiture and documentary photography
- Richard Nonas (January 3, 1936 – May 11, 2021), anthropologist and post-minimalist sculptor
- Mary Beth Norton (born 1943), American historian, specializing in American colonial history and well known for her work on women's history and the Salem witch trials
- Pat Oleszko, visual and performing artist
- Susan Orlean (born October 31, 1955), journalist and bestselling author of The Orchid Thief and The Library Book
- Peter Orner, author of two novels, two story collections, and a book of essays
- Scott E. Page, social scientist and John Seely Brown Distinguished University Professor of Complexity, Social Science, and Management at the University of Michigan
- Douglass Parker (May 27, 1927 – February 8, 2011), classicist, academic, and translator
- Doug Peacock, naturalist, outdoorsman, and author
- Vivian Perlis (April 26, 1928 – July 4, 2019), musicologist; founder and former director of Yale University's Oral History of American Music
- Elizabeth J. Perry, scholar of Chinese politics and history at Harvard University, where she is the Henry Rosovsky Professor of Government and director of the Harvard-Yenching Institute
- Alvin Plantinga (born November 15, 1932), analytic philosopher who works primarily in the fields of philosophy of religion, epistemology (particularly on issues involving epistemic justification), and logic
- Michael Posner, psychologist, researcher in the field of attention, and the editor of numerous cognitive and neuroscience compilations
- Richard Prum (born 1961), William Robertson Coe Professor of ornithology; head curator of vertebrate zoology at the Peabody Museum of Natural History at Yale University
- Rayna Rapp (pen name Rayna R. Reiter), professor and associate chair of anthropology at New York University, specializing in gender and health
- Bertram Raven (September 26, 1926 – February 26, 2020), academic; member of the faculty of the psychology department at UCLA from 1956 until his death
- Roger Reynolds (born July 18, 1934), Pulitzer prize-winning composer
- Roxana Robinson (born 30 November 1946), novelist and biographer
- David Rosenberg (born August 1, 1943), poet, biblical translator, editor, and educator
- Norman Rosten (January 1, 1913 – March 7, 1995), poet, playwright, and novelist
- Elizabeth S. Russell (May 1, 1913 – May 28, 2001), also known as "Tibby" Russellz, biologist in the field of mammalian developmental genetics
- Stanley Schachter (April 15, 1922 – June 7, 1997), social psychologist
- Betsy Schneider, photographer who lives and works in the Boston area
- Edwin William Schultz (1888 – 1971), pathologist
- Paul Schupp (born March 12, 1937), professor emeritus of Mathematics at the University of Illinois at Urbana Champaign
- Kathryn Kish Sklar (born December 1939), American historian, author, and professor
- Paul Slud (31 March 1918 – 20 February 2006), ornithologist and tropical ecologist
- Joel Sobel (born 24 March 1954), economist; professor of economics at the University of California, San Diego
- Frank Spedding (22 October 1902 – 15 December 1984), Canadian-American chemist; expert on rare earth elements, and on extraction of metals from minerals
- Edward A. Spiegel (1931 – January 2, 2020), professor of astronomy at Columbia University
- Duncan G. Steel (born 1951), experimental physicist, researcher and professor in quantum optics in condensed matter physics
- Alexander Stephan (August 16, 1946 – May 29, 2009), specialist in German literature and area studies
- Joan E. Strassmann, evolutionary biologist and the Charles Rebstock Professor of Biology at the Washington University in St. Louis
- Larissa Szporluk, poet and professor
- G. David Tilman (born 22 July 1949), ForMemRS, ecologist
- Richard Toensing (March 11, 1940 - July 2, 2014), composer and music educator
- David Treuer (born 1970) (Ojibwe), writer, critic and academic
- Susan M. Ervin-Tripp (1927–2018), linguist whose specialities were psycholinguistic and sociolinguistic research
- Karen Uhlenbeck (born August 24, 1942), mathematician and a founder of modern geometric analysis
- Sim Van der Ryn, architect, researcher, educator
- Henry Van Dyke, Jr. (1928 – December 22, 2011), novelist, editor, teacher and musician
- Andrew G. Walder (born 1953), political sociologist specializing in the study of Chinese society
- William Shi-Yuan Wang (Chinese: 王士元; born 1933), linguist, with expertise in phonology, the history of Chinese language and culture, historical linguistics, and the evolution of language in humans
- Michael Watts (born 1951 in England), emeritus Class of 1963 Professor of Geography and Development Studies at the University of California, Berkeley
- Grady Webster (1927–2005), plant systematist and taxonomist; recipient of a number of awards and appointed to fellowships of botanical institutions
- Joan Weiner, philosopher and professor emerita of philosophy at Indiana University Bloomington, known for books on Gottlob Frege
- Morris Weitz (July 24, 1916 – February 1, 1981), philosopher of aesthetics who focused primarily on ontology, interpretation, and literary criticism
- Edmund White (born January 13, 1940), novelist, memoirist, and an essayist on literary and social topics
- Michael Stewart Witherell (born 22 September 1949), physicist and laboratory director; the director of the Lawrence Berkeley National Laboratory
- Jorge Eduardo Wright (20 April 1922 – 2005), Argentinian mycologist
- Al Young (May 31, 1939 – April 17, 2021), poet, novelist, essayist, screenwriter, and professor

== Journalism, publishing, and broadcasting ==
- Roz Abrams MA, news co-anchor for CBS; reporter and anchor for almost 30 years, including 18 years with WABC in New York
- Svida Alisjahbana (BA 1988), CEO of Femina Indonesia, Indonesia's leading women's magazine
- Sam Apple, publisher and editor-in-chief of The Faster Times
- Dean Baker (Ph.D., Economics), blogger for The American Prospect
- Ray Stannard Baker (MDNG LAW: 1891), biographer of Woodrow Wilson
- Tracy Bennett, puzzle editor for The New York Times
- Margaret Bourke-White (MDNG: 1922–1924), photographer and journalist; first American female war photojournalist
- Rodney W. Brown (MA-education, MA-American culture, MA-English language and literature), producer of local and national television
- Jon Chait (BA 1994), senior editor for The New Republic
- Jeff Cohen, founder of Fairness and Accuracy in Reporting; left the group to produce Donahue on MSNBC
- Penny Colman, author and essayist
- Sarah Costello, author, co-host/editor of the asexual and aromantic podcast Sounds Fake But Okay
- Ann Coulter (LAW: JD 1988), conservative author and attorney
- Rich Eisen (BA 1990), host of sportstalk TV/radio show, The Rich Eisen Show, and journalist for NFL Network and CBS Sports; former ESPN anchor
- Larry Elder (LAW: JD 1977), talk radio show host, author, and TV show host
- Win Elliot, sports announcer and journalist
- John Fahey (BUS: MBA 1975), president and CEO of the National Geographic Society; former chairman, president and CEO of Time Life, Inc.; one of Advertising Age's top 100 marketers
- Bill Flemming (BA), television sports journalist
- Martin Ford (BSE 1985), author of Rise of the Robots: Technology and the Threat of a Jobless Future, winner of the 2015 Financial Times and McKinsey Business Book of the Year Award
- James Russell Gaines (1973), former managing editor of Time Magazine
- Arnold Gingrich (1925), founder and publisher of Esquire
- Todd Gitlin (MA 1966, Political Science), professor of journalism; social critic
- Lillian Glass, communication and body language expert, media commentator known for analyzing body language of newsmakers, widely credited with popularizing the term "toxic people" through her bestselling book of the same name, and award-winning filmmaker
- Wendell Goler, Fox News White House correspondent
- George Zhibin Gu, journalist and consultant
- Sanjay Gupta (MD: 1993), CNN anchor, reporter and senior medical correspondent; Emmy winner
- Raelynn Hillhouse (HHRS: MA, Ph.D. 1993), national security expert and blogger (The Spy Who Billed Me); novelist; political scientist
- Dana Jacobson (BA 1993), ESPN anchorwoman
- Alireza Jafarzadeh, senior Foreign Affairs Analyst for Fox News Television and other major TV networks; author of The Iran Threat: President Ahmadinejad and the Coming Nuclear Crisis
- Leon Jaroff (COE: BSE EE, BS EM 1950), a mainstay for the Time Inc. family of publications since he joined as an editorial trainee for LIFE magazine in 1951; moved to Time in 1954, and became its chief science writer in 1966; named a senior editor in 1970, a post he kept until he semi-retired in 2000
- Charles Johnson, aka The Electrifying Mojo; influential Detroit-area DJ
- Paul Kangas, stockbroker for twelve years; host of Nightly Business Report since it was a local Florida program in 1979
- Kayla Kaszyca, co-host/marketing manager of the asexual and aromantic podcast Sounds Fake But Okay
- Ken Kelley, founder of the Ann Arbor Argus and Sundance, and Playboy interviewer
- William F. Kerby (AB 1920s), chairman of Dow Jones and Company
- Laurence Kirshbaum (AB 1966), founder of LJK Literary Management; chairman of Time Warner Book Group
- Melvin J. Lasky (MA History), combat historian in France and Germany during WWII; assistant to the U.S. military governor of Berlin in early postwar years; founder and editor of the anti-Communist journal Encounter, which was in 1966 shown to be secretly financed by the CIA
- Daniel Levin, writer
- Ann Marie Lipinski, former editor of the Chicago Tribune; 1987 Pulitzer Prize winner
- Richard Lui (MBA), journalist; MSNBC news anchor; former news anchor for five years at CNN Worldwide
- Wednesday Martin, journalist, memoirist, anthropologist
- Robert McHenry, encyclopedist and author; editor-in-chief (emeritus) of the Encyclopædia Britannica
- Ari Melber (AB 2002), MSNBC news anchor; NBC News legal analyst
- John J. Miller, National Political Reporter for the National Review
- Paul Scott Mowrer, journalist and Pulitzer Prize winner
- Davi Napoleon (AB 1966; AM 1968), writes a monthly feature for Live Design; former columnist for TheaterWeek and InTheater
- Daniel Okrent (BA 1969), public editor of New York Times; editor-at-large of Time Inc.; Pulitzer Prize finalist in history (Great Fortune, 2004); founding father of Rotisserie League Baseball
- Marvin Olasky (Ph.D. 1976), conservative pundit
- Susan Orlean (AB), staff writer for The New Yorker
- Norman Ornstein, American Enterprise Institute Senior Fellow
- Shannon Pettypiece, White House Correspondent, Senior Policy Reporter NBC News
- Phil Ponce (LAW: JD 1974), Chicago television journalist, host of Chicago Tonight on WTTW PBS station
- Dave Portnoy (1999, Education), founder of Barstool Sports
- William E. Quinby (AB 1858, MA 1861), owner of the Detroit Free Press and United States Ambassador to the Netherlands
- Evan Rosen (BA), journalist, strategist, author of The Culture of Collaboration
- Adam Schefter, former Denver Post and Denver Broncos correspondent for 15 years; ESPN and NFL Network contributor
- John Schubeck, television reporter and anchor, one of the few to anchor newscasts on all three network owned-and-operated stations in one major market
- Samuel Spencer Scott, president of Harcourt, Brace & Company from 1948 until his retirement in 1954
- David Shuster, television journalist with Current TV; talk radio host; former anchor for MSNBC; has also worked for Fox News and CNN
- Rob Siegel (1993), editor-in-chief of The Onion; screenplay writer for The Wrestler
- Carole Simpson (BA 1962), former ABC News correspondent; Emerson College professor
- Bert Randolph Sugar (LAW: JD 1961); former editor at The Ring, Boxing Illustrated, and Fight Game magazines; wrote more than 80 books on boxing, baseball, horse racing, and sports trivia
- Amy Sullivan, contributing editor for Time magazine, covers religion and politics; also writes for the magazine's political blog, Swampland
- Jerald F. ter Horst (also known as Jerald Franklin ter Horst) (BA 1947), Gerald Ford's short-term press secretary
- Peter Turnley, photojournalist known for documenting the human condition and current events
- John Voelker (LAW: 1928), author of Anatomy of a Murder
- Mike Wallace (A.B. 1939), TV journalist, longtime host of 60 Minutes; winner of 20 Emmys and three Peabodys
- David Weir, editor and journalist, editor in chief at Keep Media as of 2007
- Margaret Wente (BA), writer for The Globe and Mail, 2006 winner of the National Newspaper Award for column-writing; has edited leading business magazines Canadian Business and ROB
- David Westin (BA, with honors and distinction; LAW: JD summa cum laude 1977), president of ABC News
- Roger Wilkins (AB 1953, LAW: LLB 1956, HLHD 1993), journalist of the Washington Post; shared the Pulitzer Prize for his Watergate editorials
- Tracy Wolfson, reporter for CBS Sports, lead sideline reporter for the NFL on CBS
- Bob Woodruff (LAW: JD), ABC World News Tonight anchor, replaced Peter Jennings
- Robin Wright, author, Washington Post
- Eric Zorn, columnist and blogger for the Chicago Tribune
- Daniel Zwerdling, investigative radio journalist for NPR News

== MacArthur Foundation award winners ==
As of 2020, 31 Michigan alumni — 17 undergraduate students and 14 graduate students — have been awarded a MacArthur fellowship.

- James Blinn (BS Physics 1970; MSE 1972; Communications Science 1970; MS Information and Control Engineering 1972)
- Caroline Walker Bynum (BA 1962), Medieval scholar; MacArthur Fellow
- Eric Charnov (BS 1969), evolutionary ecologist
- William A. Christian (Ph.D. 1971), religious studies scholar
- Shannon Lee Dawdy (M.A. 2000, Ph.D. 2003), 2010 fellowship winner; assistant professor of anthropology at the University of Chicago
- Philip DeVries (B.S. 1975), biologist
- William H. Durham (Ph.D. 1973), anthropologist
- Andrea Dutton (MA, Ph.D.), associate professor of geology at the University of Florida
- Aaron Dworkin (BA 1997, M.A. 1998), fellow, founder, and president of Detroit-based Sphinx Organization, which strives to increase the number of African-Americans and Latinos having careers in classical music
- Steven Goodman (BS 1984), adjunct research investigator in the U-M Museum of Zoology's bird division; conservation biologist in the Department of Zoology at Chicago's Field Museum of Natural History
- David Green (BA 1978; MPH 1982), executive director of Project Impact
- Ann Ellis Hanson (BA 1957; MA 1963), visiting associate professor of Greek and Latin
- John Henry Holland (MA 1954; Ph.D. 1959), professor of electrical engineering and computer science, College of Engineering; professor of psychology, College of Literature, Science, and the Arts
- June Huh (Ph.D.), mathematician, 2022 Fields Medal winner; solved various famous unsolved problems in the field of combinatorics, and considered the main contributor to the combinatorial Hodge theory
- Vonnie McLoyd (MA 1973, Ph.D. (1975), developmental psychologist
- Natalia Molina, professor; received her Ph.D. and M.A. from the University of Michigan
- Denny Moore (BA), linguist, anthropologist
- Nancy A. Moran (Ph.D. 1982), evolutionary biologist; Yale professor; co-founder of the Yale Microbial Diversity Institute
- Dominique Morisseau (BFA 2000), playwright and actor
- Cecilia Muñoz (BA 2000), senior vice president for the Office of Research, Advocacy and Legislation at the National Council of La Raza (NCLR), White House director of Intergovernmental Affairs
- Dimitri Nakassis (BA 1997), 2015 MacArthur Fellow; joined the faculty of the University of Toronto in 2008; currently an associate professor in the Department of Classics
- Richard Prum (Ph.D. 1989), William Robertson Coe Professor of Ornithology; Head Curator of Vertebrate Zoology at the Peabody Museum of Natural History at Yale University
- Mary Tinetti (BA 1973; MD 1978), physician; Gladys Phillips Crofoot Professor of Medicine and Epidemiology and Public Health at Yale University; Director of the Yale Program on Aging
- Amos Tversky (Ph.D.. 1965), psychologist
- Karen K. Uhlenbeck (BA 1964), mathematician
- Jesmyn Ward (MFA 2005), writer of fiction
- Julia Wolfe (BA 1980), classical composer
- Henry Tutwiler Wright (BA 1964), Albert Clanton Spaulding Distinguished University Professor of Anthropology in the Department of Anthropology; Curator of Near Eastern Archaeology in the Museum of Anthropology at the University of Michigan; 1993 MacArthur Fellows Program
- Tara Zahra (MA 2002; Ph.D. 2005); fellow with the Harvard Society of Fellows (2005–2007) prior to joining the faculty of the University of Chicago; 2014 MacArthur Fellow
- George Zweig (BA 1959), physicist who conceptualized quarks ("aces" in his nomenclature)

== Mathematics ==
- Ralph H. Abraham, mathematician; known for his contribution to the development of dynamical systems theory; a consultant on chaos theory
- Kenneth Ira Appel (Ph.D.), mathematician; in 1976, with Wolfgang Haken, solved one of the most famous problems in mathematics, the four-color theorem
- Carl Bennett (Ph.D. 1952), statistician; fellow of the American Association for the Advancement of Science
- Harry C. Carver (BS 1915), mathematician and academic; known for his contributions to the development of mathematical statistics as an academic discipline
- George Dantzig (MA Math 1937), father of linear programming; studied at Michigan under T.H. Hildebrandt, R.L. Wilder, and G.Y. Rainich
- Carl de Boor (Ph.D. Mathematics 1966), known for pioneering work on splines, National Medal of Science 2003; John von Neumann Prize from the Society for Industrial and Applied Mathematics in 1996
- Dorothy Elizabeth Denning, information security researcher; known for Lattice-based access control and Intrusion detection systems
- Sister Mary Celine Fasenmyer (Ph.D. 1946), mathematician noted for her work on hypergeometric functions and linear algebra
- Walter Feit (Ph.D. 1955), winner of the 7th Cole Prize in 1965; known for proving the Feit–Thompson theorem
- David Gale (MA 1947), mathematician and economist; known for his contributions to the fields of mathematical economics, game theory, and convex analysis.
- Frederick Gehring (AB 1946), mathematician; known for his contributions to the development of the Quasi-conformal mappings
- Seymour Ginsburg (Ph.D. 1952), pioneer of automata theory; known for his contributions to the development of the Formal Language Theory, Abstract Families of Languages, Database theory and Object Histories
- Thomas N.E. Greville (Ph.D. 1933), mathematician; proposed the Greville method which often applied within the field of parapsychology.
- Theophil Henry Hildebrandt, received the second Chauvenet Prize in 1929 for his 1926 expository article The Borel theorem and its generalizations
- Dorothy McFadden Hoover (ABD), physicist and mathematician featured in Margot Lee Shetterly's Hidden Figures
- June Huh (Ph.D. 2014), Fields Medal winner; proved the Heron-Rota-Welsh conjecture with algebraic geometrical method, among other conjectures; known for his authorship of Combinatorial Hodge Theory and other research in algebraic combinatorics
- Meyer Jerison (Ph.D. 1950), mathematician; known for his work in functional analysis and rings, especially for collaborating with Leonard Gillman on one of the standard texts in the field, Rings of Continuous Functions
- James Raymond Munkres, mathematician; known for his contributions to the development of the Munkres assignment algorithm and his obstruction theory for the smoothing of homeomorphisms; author of classic textbook Topology
- W. Wesley Peterson (Ph.D. 1954), mathematician; Shannon Award winner
- Ralph S. Phillips (Ph.D.), mathematician; academic; known for his contributions to functional analysis, scattering theory, and servomechanisms
- Leonard Jimmie Savage (BS 1938, Ph.D. 1941), author of The Foundations of Statistics (1954); rediscovered Bachelier and introduced his theories to Paul Samuelson, who corrected Bachelier and used his thesis on randomness to advance derivative pricing theory
- Joel Shapiro (Ph.D.), mathematician; leading expert in the field of composition operators
- Isadore M. Singer (BA 1944), mathematician; winner of the Abel Prize, and the Bôcher Memorial Prize; known for Ambrose–Singer theorem, Atiyah–Singer index theorem, Atiyah–Hitchin–Singer theorem, Ray–Singer torsion and Kadison–Singer problem
- David Slepian (B.Sc.), mathematician; Shannon Award winner
- Stephen Smale (BS 1952, MS 1953, Ph.D. 1957), Fields Medal winner; winner of the 2007 Wolf Prize in mathematics; 1965 Veblen Prize for Geometry; 1988 Chauvenet Prize from the Mathematical Association of America; 1989 Von Neumann Award from the Society for Industrial and Applied Mathematics; known for research in topology, dynamical systems and mathematical economics
- George W. Snedecor (MA 1913), mathematician and statistician; known for his contributions to the development of the Snedecor's F-distribution
- Edwin Henry Spanier (Ph.D. 1947), mathematician working in algebraic topology; known for his contributions to the development of the Alexander–Spanier cohomology, Dubins–Spanier theorems and Spanier–Whitehead duality
- Frank Spitzer (BA, Ph.D.), mathematician who made fundamental contributions to probability theory, including the theory of random walks, fluctuation theory, percolation theory, and especially the theory of interacting particle systems
- Norman Steenrod (A.B. 1932), algebraic topologist, author of The Topology of Fiber Bundles; believed to have coined the phrase "abstract nonsense", used in category theory
- Karen Uhlenbeck (B.A. 1964), one of the founders of modern geometric analysis; winner of the Abel Prize (2019)
- Chelsea Walton (Ph.D. 2011), winner of the 2018 André Lichnerowicz Prize

=== Mathematics educators ===
- Edward G. Begle (MA 1936), educator and mathematician; the director of the School Mathematics Study Group, the primary group credited for developing what came to be known as New Math
- Marjorie Lee Browne (Ph.D. 1950), educator and one of the first three African-American woman to earn a doctorate in mathematics
- Brian Conrey (Ph.D. 1980), educator and mathematician; executive director of the American Institute of Mathematics
- Wade Ellis (Ph.D. 1948), educator and mathematician, member of the Board of Governors of the Mathematical Association of America, and first black faculty member at Oberlin College
- D.J. Lewis (Ph.D. 1950), educator and mathematician; specializing in number theory; chaired the Department of Mathematics at the University of Michigan (1984–1994); director of the Division of Mathematical Sciences at the National Science Foundation
- Clarence F. Stephens (Ph.D. 1944), chair of the SUNY Potsdam mathematics department; ninth African-American to receive a Ph.D. in mathematics
- Cornelia Strong (M.A. 1931), educator and mathematician
- Suzanne Weekes (Ph.D. 1995), mathematician and educator; fellow of the Association for Women in Mathematics
- Robert Simpson Woodward (A.B. 1872), educator and mathematician; president of the American Mathematical Society (1899–1900); in 1904 became president of the newly formed Carnegie Institution

=== Fellows of the American Mathematical Society ===
As of 2021, UM numbers among its alumni 29 fellows of the American Mathematical Society.

- Kenneth Appel (October 8, 1932 – April 19, 2013), mathematician; in 1976, with colleague Wolfgang Haken at the University of Illinois at Urbana–Champaign, solved one of the most famous problems in mathematics, the four-color theorem
- Susanne Brenner, mathematician whose research concerns the finite element method and related techniques for the numerical solution of differential equations
- Ralph Louis Cohen (born 1952), mathematician specializing in algebraic topology and differential topology
- Robert Connelly (born July 15, 1942), mathematician specializing in discrete geometry and rigidity theory
- Brian Conrey (23 June 1955), mathematician, executive director of the American Institute of Mathematics
- Ronald Getoor (9 February 1929 – 28 October 2017), mathematician
- Tai-Ping Liu (Chinese: 劉太平; pinyin: Liú Tàipíng; born 18 November 1945), Taiwanese mathematician specializing in partial differential equations
- Russell Lyons (6 September 1957), mathematician specializing in probability theory on graphs, combinatorics, statistical mechanics, ergodic theory and harmonic analysis
- Gaven Martin FRSNZ FASL FAMS (born 8 October 1958), New Zealand mathematician
- Susan Montgomery (born 2 April 1943), mathematician whose current research interests concern noncommutative algebras
- Paul Muhly (born September 7, 1944), mathematician
- James Munkres (born August 18, 1930), professor emeritus of mathematics at MIT
- Zuhair Nashed (born May 14, 1936, in Aleppo, Syria), mathematician, working on integral and operator equations, inverse and ill-posed problems, numerical and nonlinear functional analysis, optimization and approximation theory, operator theory, optimal control theory, signal analysis, and signal processing
- Peter Orlik (born 12 November 1938, in Budapest), mathematician, known for his research on topology, algebra, and combinatorics
- Mihnea Popa (born 11 August 1973), Romanian-American mathematician at Harvard University, specializing in algebraic geometry; known for his work on complex birational geometry, Hodge theory, abelian varieties, and vector bundles
- Jane Cronin Scanlon (July 17, 1922 – June 19, 2018), mathematician; emeritus professor of mathematics at Rutgers University
- Maria E. Schonbek, Argentine-American mathematician at the University of California, Santa Cruz; research concerns fluid dynamics and associated partial differential equations such as the Navier–Stokes equations
- Paul Schupp (born March 12, 1937), professor emeritus of Mathematics at the University of Illinois at Urbana Champaign
- George Roger Sell (February 7, 1937 – May 29, 2015), mathematician, specializing in differential equations, dynamical systems, and applications to fluid dynamics, climate modeling, control systems, and other subjects
- Charles Sims (April 14, 1937 – October 23, 2017), mathematician best known for his work in group theory
- Isadore Singer (May 3, 1924 – February 11, 2021), mathematician
- Christopher Skinner (born June 4, 1972), mathematician working in number theory and arithmetic aspects of the Langlands program
- Karen E. Smith (born 1965), mathematician specializing in commutative algebra and algebraic geometry
- Kannan Soundararajan (born December 27, 1973), India-born American mathematician and a professor of mathematics at Stanford University
- Irena Swanson, mathematician specializing in commutative algebra
- Karen Uhlenbeck (born August 24, 1942), mathematician; a founder of modern geometric analysis
- Judy L. Walker, mathematician; Aaron Douglas Professor of Mathematics at the University of Nebraska–Lincoln, where she chaired the mathematics department 2012–2016
- John H. Walter (born 14 December 1927), mathematician known for proving the Walter theorem in the theory of finite groups
- Charles Weibel (born October 28, 1950), mathematician working on algebraic K-theory, algebraic geometry and homological algebra

== Manhattan project ==
A number of Michigan graduates or fellows were involved with the Manhattan Project, chiefly with regard to the physical chemistry of the device.

- Robert F. Bacher (Ph.D.), member of the Manhattan Project; professor of physics at Caltech; president of the Universities Research Association
- Lawrence Bartell, before he had finished his studies, was invited by Glenn Seaborg to interview for a position working on the Manhattan Project; worked on methods for extracting plutonium from uranium
- Lyman James Briggs, engineer, physicist and administrator
- Donald L. Campbell, chemical engineer
- Allen F. Donovan, worked for the Manhattan Project on the design of the shape of the Fat Man atomic bomb and its release mechanism
- Taylor Drysdale, earned master's degrees in nuclear physics and mathematics from the University of Michigan, joined the U.S. military, worked on the Manhattan Project, and retired from the U.S. Air Force as a colonel
- Arnold B. Grobman, began post-secondary education at the University of Michigan in Ann Arbor, earning his bachelor's degree in 1939; research associate on the Manhattan Project 1944–1946, later publishing Our Atomic Heritage about his experiences
- Herb Grosch, received his B.S. and PhD in astronomy from the University of Michigan in 1942; hired in 1945 by IBM to do backup calculations for the Manhattan Project working at Watson Scientific Computing Laboratory at Columbia University
- Ross Gunn, physicist who worked on the Manhattan Project during World War II
- Isabella L. Karle, chemist instrumental in developing techniques to extract plutonium chloride; recipient of the Garvan-Olin Medal, Gregori Aminoff Prize, Bower Award, National Medal of Science, and the Navy Distinguished Civilian Service Award
- Jerome Karle, physical chemist
- James Stark Koehler, physicist, specializing in metal defects and their interactions; known for the eponymous Peach-Koehler stress formula
- Emil Konopinski (1933, MA 1934, Ph.D. 1936), patented a device that made the first hydrogen bomb with Dr. Edward Teller; member of the Manhattan Project
- John Henry Manley, physicist who worked with J. Robert Oppenheimer at the University of California, Berkeley before becoming a group leader during the Manhattan Project
- Elliott Organick, chemist, Manhattan Project, 1944–1945
- Carolyn Parker, physicist who worked 1943–1947 on the Dayton Project, the polonium research and development arm of the Manhattan Project; first African-American woman to earn a postgraduate degree in physics
- Franklin E. Roach, involved in high explosives physics research connected with the Manhattan Project
- Frank Spedding (1925), chemist; developed an ion exchange procedure for separating rare earth elements, purifying uranium, and separating isotopes; Guggenheim award winner
- Arthur Widmer, was attached on a three-year stint in 1943 as one of the Kodak researchers assigned to the Manhattan Project in Berkeley, California and Oak Ridge, Tennessee, as an analytical chemists developing methods of uranium analysis, which led to the development of the atomic bomb

== Medicine and dentistry ==
- John Jacob Abel (PHARM: Ph.D. 1883), North American "father of pharmacology"; discovered epinephrine; first crystallized insulin; founded the department of pharmacology at Michigan; in 1893 established the department of pharmacology at the newly founded Johns Hopkins University School of Medicine; first full-time professor of pharmacology in the United States
- Susan Anderson (1897), one of the first female physicians in Colorado
- Robert C. Atkins (BA 1951), developed the Atkins Diet
- John Auer (BS 1898), credited with the discovery of Auer rods
- Sarah Gertrude Banks (MD 1873), physician and suffragist
- William Henry Beierwaltes (BS 1938, MED: MD 1941), champion of the use of radioiodine together with surgery in thyroid diagnosis and care; lead author of first book on nuclear medicine, 1957's Clinical Use of Radioisotopes
- Elissa P. Benedek (MD 1960), child and adolescent psychiatrist, forensic psychiatrist, adjunct clinical professor of psychiatry at the University of Michigan
- Christine Iverson Bennett (MED: MD 1907), medical missionary who worked in Arabia during WWI
- David Botstein (Ph.D. 1967); leader in the Human Genome Project; director of Princeton's Lewis-Sigler Institute for Integrative Genomics
- John Caffey (BA 1916, MD 1919), pediatric radiologist
- Alexa Canady (AB 1971, MED: MD 1975), became first African-American female neurosurgeon in the country when she was 30; chief of neurosurgery at Children's Hospital of Michigan in Detroit for almost 15 years
- Benjamin S. Carson (MED: MD 1977), former director of pediatric neurosurgery at Johns Hopkins Hospital
- Arul Chinnaiyan (MED: MD 1999), cancer researcher; recipient of the 28th annual American Association for Cancer Research Award for Outstanding Achievement
- Thomas Benton Cooley (MED: 1895), pediatrician; hematologist; professor of hygiene and medicine at the University of Michigan; son of Thomas McIntyre Cooley, first chairman of the Interstate Commerce Commission
- Ronald M. Davis (AB 1978), 162nd president of the American Medical Association; Director of the Center for Health Promotion and Disease Prevention at the Henry Ford Health System in Detroit
- Mary Gage Day (MED: MD 1888), physician, medical writer
- Paul de Kruif (Ph.D. 1916), author of Microbe Hunters
- Donna Farber (BS 1984), chief of surgical sciences at Columbia University and a fellow of the American Association for the Advancement of Science
- Vine Cynthia Colby Foster (B.Phil. 1876), pioneering woman physician
- John R. Francis (MD 1878), obstetrician and clinical lecturer at Howard University
- Julio Frenk (SPH: M.P.H. 1981, MA 1982, Ph.D. 1983), Minister of Health for Mexico
- Seraph Frissell (MED: MD 1875), physician, medical writer
- Sanjay Gupta (MD: 1993), CNN anchor, reporter and senior medical correspondent; former neurosurgeon
- Lucy M. Hall (MED: MD 1878), first woman ever received at St Thomas' Hospital's bedside clinics
- Alice Hamilton (MED: MD 1893), specialist in lead poisoning and industrial diseases; known as the "Mother of Industrial Health;" in 1919 became the first woman on the faculty at Harvard Medical School; the first woman to receive tenure there; honored with her picture on the 55-cent postage stamp; winner of the Lasker Award
- Mary Hawn (BSc 1987, MD 1991, MPH 1996), chair of surgery at Stanford University, and member of the National Academy of Medicine
- Nancy M. Hill (MED: MD 1874), Civil War nurse and one of the first female doctors in the US
- Jerome P. Horwitz (Ph.D. 1950), synthesized AZT in 1964, a drug now used to treat AIDS
- Joel Lamstein (BS 1965), co-founder and president of John Snow, Inc (JSI) and JSI Research & Training Institute, Inc., international public health research and consulting firms
- Josiah K. Lilly Jr. (1914 college of pharmacy), chairman and president of Eli Lilly
- Howard Markel (MED: MD 1986), physician, medical historian, best-selling author, medical journalist, and member of the National Academy of Medicine, George E. Wantz Distinguished Professor of the History of Medicine at the University of Michigan, Guggenheim Fellow
- William James Mayo (MED: MD 1883), co-founder of the Mayo Clinic
- Joia Mukherjee (BS 1985), associate professor at Brigham and Women’s Hospital and chief medical officer of Partners In Health
- Larry Nassar (BS 1985), convicted serial child molester and a former USA Gymnastics national team doctor and osteopathic physician at Michigan State University
- Clara Raven (BA, MS), physician
- Jessica Rickert, first female American Indian dentist in America, which she became upon graduating from the University of Michigan School of Dentistry in 1975; member of the Prairie Band Potawatomi Nation; direct descendant of the Indian chief Wahbememe (Whitepigeon)
- Ida Rollins, first African-American woman to earn a dental degree in the United States, which she earned from the University of Michigan in 1890
- Klaus Schmiegel (BS 1961), co-inventor of the antidepressant Prozac
- Leonard Andrew Scheele (BA 1931), US surgeon general 1948–1956
- Eric B. Schoomaker (BS 1970, MED: MD 1975), lieutenant general; retired surgeon general of the Army
- Thomas L. Schwenk (MED: MD 1975), dean of the University of Nevada School of Medicine
- John Clark Sheehan (MS 1938, Ph.D. 1941), chemist who pioneered the first synthetic penicillin breakthrough in 1957
- Norman Shumway (MDNG), heart transplantation pioneer; entered the University of Michigan as a pre-law student, but was drafted into the Army in 1943
- Siti Hasmah (SPH 1966), one of the first female doctors in Malaysia, and later the wife of Malaysia's fourth Prime Minister Mahathir Mohamad
- Dr. Homer Stryker (MED: MD 1925), founder of Stryker Corporation
- Dr. William Erastus Upjohn (MED: MD 1875), inventor of the first pill that dissolved easily in the human body
- Charles Van Riper, speech pathologist
- Richard C. Vinci, retired United States Navy admiral and former commander of the United States Navy Dental Corps
- Frank Norman Wilson (BS 1911, MED: MD 1913), cardiologist

== Military ==
- George H. Cannon (BS 1938), United States Marine Corps officer and World War II Medal of Honor recipient killed during the First Bombardment of Midway
- John P. Coursey (BS 1937), United States Marine Corps aviator during World War II and late brigadier general
- Francis C. Flaherty (BS 1940), United States Navy officer and World War II Medal of Honor recipient killed during the Attack on Pearl Harbor.
- Edward C. Peter II (MS 1955), United States Army lieutenant general
- Samuel C. Phillips (MS 1950), director of the Apollo program 1964–1969, director of the National Security Agency 1972–1973, commander of Air Force Systems Command 1973–1975
- Eric B. Schoomaker (BS 1970, MED: MD 1975), Lieutenant General; retired Surgeon General of the Army
- Oliver Lyman Spaulding, U.S. Army brigadier general
- Charles Frederick Taylor (1858; did not graduate), Union Army colonel killed in action at the Battle of Gettysburg
- Richard C. Vinci, retired United States Navy admiral and former commander of the United States Navy Dental Corps

== Miscellaneous honors ==
- Uwem Akpan (MFA 2007), Nigerian author; Jesuit priest; won Commonwealth Writers' Prize for Best First Book and the PEN/Beyond Margins Award for Say You're One of Them
- W. Brian Arthur (MA 1969), Lagrange Prize in Complexity Science 2008; Schumpeter Prize in Economics 1990;
- Carl de Boor (Ph.D. Mathematics 1966), known for pioneering work on splines, National Medal of Science 2003; John von Neumann Prize from the Society for Industrial and Applied Mathematics in 1996
- Arleigh Burke, namesake of a class of guided-missile destroyers of the United States Navy
- Robert Cailliau, winner of an ACM award jointly awarded to Berners-Lee for the creation of the World Wide Web
- Edgar Codd, in 2004, SIGMOD renamed its highest prize to the SIGMOD Edgar F. Codd Innovations Award in his honour
- Chuck Coleman won two Collier Trophies for his involvement in the development of the McDonnel Douglas C-17 Globemaster (1994) and Scaled Composites' SpaceShipOne (2004)
- Natalie Zemon Davis (Ph.D. 1959) CC, Canadian and American historian of the early modern period; awarded the 2010 Holberg International Memorial Prize
- David DeWitt, ACM Fellow; received the ACM SIGMOD Edgar F. Codd Innovations Award in 1995
- Walter Feit (Ph.D. 1955), winner of the 7th Cole Prize in 1965; known for proving the Feit–Thompson theorem
- Stephanie Forrest, ACM/AAAI Allen Newell Award (2011)
- Gerald Ford, honored with navy ship CVN-78, the Gerald Ford, as well as an entire class of aircraft carriers named for him
- Donald N. Frey (BS MTL 1947, MSE 1949, PhD 1951, D. Eng. hon. 1967), chairman and CEO of Bell & Howell for 17 years; received the National Medal of Technology in 1990
- Frederick Gehring (AB 1946), T. H. Hildebrandt Distinguished University Professor Emeritus of Mathematics; recipient of the 2006 AMS Leroy P. Steele Prize for Lifetime Achievement
- Aaron Hamburger (BA 1995), writer; his short story collection The View from Stalin's Head (2004) was awarded the Rome Prize by the American Academy of Arts and Letters and the American Academy in Rome; his novel Faith for Beginners (2005) was nominated for a Lambda Literary Award
- Alice Hamilton, pioneer in industrial health, honored with a 55 cent postage stamp in the Great Americans series; winner of the Lasker Award
- Gabrielle Hamilton, chef, author, winner of James Beard Award
- Theophil Henry Hildebrandt, UM instructor of mathematics starting in 1909, where he spent most of his career; chairman of the department from 1934 until his retirement in 1957; received the second Chauvenet Prize of the Mathematical Association of America in 1929
- John D. Kraus, IEEE Fellow; winner of a IEEE Centennial Medal winner of the IEEE Heinrich Hertz Medal
- Ross Macdonald, namesake of the Ross Macdonald Literary Award
- Charles Willard Moore (ARCH: B.Arch 1947, Hon Arch D. 1992), designer of Lurie Tower on Michigan's North Campus; winner of the AIA Gold Medal in 1991
- Patrick O'Keeffe (MFA), winner of the Hopwood Program's Chamberlain Award for Creative Writing for Above the Bar; instructor in U-M's Sweetland Writing Center; won the 2006 Story Prize for The Hill Road; won 2006 Whiting Writers Award
- Larry Page, winner of the Marconi Prize in 2004
- Claude Shannon, IEEE Medal of Honor; National Medal of Science; Claude E. Shannon Award
- Stephen Smale (BS 1952, MS 1953, Ph.D. 1957), Fields Medal winner; winner of the 2007 Wolf Prize in mathematics; 1965 Veblen Prize for Geometry; 1988 Chauvenet Prize from the Mathematical Association of America; 1989 Von Neumann Award from the Society for Industrial and Applied Mathematics
- Edmund White, Chevalier (and later Officier) de l'Ordre des Arts et des Lettres in France in 1993
- Nancy Willard (BA, PhD), 1982 Newbery Medal for A Visit to William Blake's Inn

== National Academy members ==
As of 2021, dozens of Michigan graduates have been inducted into various National Academies (inter alia, the National Academy of Engineering, the National Academy of Science...).

- John Jacob Abel, biochemist and pharmacologist, established the pharmacology department at Johns Hopkins University School of Medicine in 1893
- Edward Charles Bassett (1921–1999), architect based in San Francisco; elected into the National Academy of Design as an associate member in 1970, and became a full member in 1990
- Michael Bellavia, COO of Animax Entertainment
- John Robert Beyster, founder of Science Applications International Corporation
- Lyman James Briggs, nominated by US President Herbert C. Hoover as director of the National Bureau of Standards in 1932
- James Brown, biologist and academic
- John W. Cahn (January 9, 1928 – March 14, 2016), scientist and recipient of the 1998 National Medal of Science
- Robert L. Carneiro, anthropologist and curator of the American Museum of Natural History
- Rufus Cole, medical doctor, first director of the Rockefeller University Hospital
- George Comstock, helped organize the American Astronomical Society in 1897, serving first as secretary and later as vice president; elected to the National Academy of Sciences in 1899
- Heber Doust Curtis, worked at Lick Observatory 1902–1920, continuing the survey of nebulae initiated by Keeler
- David DeWitt, elected a member of the National Academy of Engineering (1998) for the theory and construction of database systems; fellow of the Association for Computing Machinery
- Allen F. Donovan, aerospace engineer and systems engineer who was involved in the development of the Atlas and Titan rocket families
- James R. Downing, pediatric oncologist and executive; president and chief executive officer of St. Jude Children's Research Hospital
- Harry George Drickamer (November 19, 1918 – May 6, 2002), born Harold George Weidenthal, pioneer experimentalist in high-pressure studies of condensed matter
- John M. Eargle, Oscar- and Grammy-winning audio engineer; musician (piano and church and theater organ)
- Kent Flannery, archaeologist who has conducted and published extensive research on the pre-Columbian cultures and civilizations of Mesoamerica, and in particular those of central and southern Mexico
- Mars Guy Fontana, namesake of the university's Fontana Laboratories and a professorship
- Donald S. Fredrickson, medical researcher, principally of the lipid and cholesterol metabolism; director of National Institutes of Health and subsequently the Howard Hughes Medical Institute
- Robert A. Fuhrman, engineer responsible for the development of the Polaris Missile and Poseidon missile' president and chief operating officer of Lockheed Corporation; elected to the National Academy of Engineering in 1976 "for contributions to the design and development of the Polaris and Poseidon underwater launch ballistic missile systems"
- Stanley Marion Garn, human biologist and educator; professor of anthropology at the College for Literature, Science and Arts at the University of Michigan
- Sam Granick, biochemist known for his studies of ferritin and iron metabolism, of chloroplast structure, and of the biosynthesis of heme and related molecules
- Sonia Guillén Guillén, one of Peru's leading experts on mummies
- George Edward Holbrook, chemical engineer and a founding member of the National Academy of Engineering
- George W. Housner, professor of earthquake engineering at the California Institute of Technology and National Medal of Science laureate
- Bill Ivey, folklorist and author; seventh chairman of the National Endowment for the Arts; a past chairman of the National Academy of Recording Arts and Sciences
- Kelly Johnson, contributed to a series of important aircraft designs, most notably the Lockheed U-2 and SR-71 Blackbird
- Lewis Ralph Jones, botanist and agricultural biologist
- Paul Kangas, Miami-based co-anchor of the PBS television program Nightly Business Report, a role he held from 1979, when the show was a local PBS program in Miami, through 2009
- Paul J. Kern, Commanding General of the United States Army Materiel Command 2001–2004
- Pete King, elected president of the National Academy of Recording Arts and Sciences in 1967
- Conrad Phillip Kottak, anthropologist; did extensive research in Brazil and Madagascar, visiting societies there and writing books about them
- Thomas A. LaVeist (MA 1985, PhD 1988, PDF 1990), dean and Weatherhead Presidential Chair in Health Equity at Tulane University School of Public Health & Tropical Medicine
- Alexander Leaf, physician and research scientist best known for his work linking diet and exercise to the prevention of heart disease
- Samuel C. Lind, radiation chemist, referred to as "the father of modern radiation chemistry"
- Joyce Marcus, Latin American archaeologist and professor in the Department of Anthropology, College of Literature, Science, and the Arts at the University of Michigan, Ann Arbor; Curator of Latin American Archaeology, University of Michigan Museum of Anthropological Archaeology
- Bill Joy (born November 8, 1954), co-founded Sun Microsystems in 1982, served as its chief scientist and CTO until 2003
- Isabella Karle, chemist who was instrumental in developing techniques to extract plutonium chloride from a mixture containing plutonium oxide
- James Nobel Landis, founding member of the National Academy of Engineering; president of the American Society of Mechanical Engineers 1958–59
- Warren Harmon Lewis, president of the American Association of Anatomists and the International Society for Experimental Cytology; held honorary memberships in the Royal Microscopical Society in London and Accademia Nazionale dei Lincei in Rome
- Anne Harris, served an elected term on the Board of Governors of the Chicago Chapter of the National Academy of Recording Arts and Sciences
- Herbert Spencer Jennings, zoologist, geneticist, and eugenicist
- Digby McLaren, head of the palaeontology section of the Geological Survey of Canada
- Marshall Warren Nirenberg, biochemist and geneticist; shared a Nobel Prize in Physiology or Medicine in 1968
- Kenneth Olden, director of the National Institute of Environmental Health Sciences and National Toxicology Program, being the first African-American to head an NIH institute, a position he held 1991–2005
- Raymond Pearl, biologist, regarded as one of the founders of biogerontology
- Samuel C. Phillips, United States Air Force general who served as director of NASA's Apollo program 1964–1969, seventh director of the NSA 1972–1973, and commander of Air Force Systems Command 1973–1975
- John Porter, led efforts resulting in doubling funding for the NIH during his chairmanship
- Bonnie Rideout, member of the National Academy of Recording Arts and Sciences (NARAS), having served on the Board of Governors for the Washington, D.C. branch
- Eugene Roberts, neuroscientist; in 1950, he was the first to report on the discovery of gamma-aminobutyric acid (GABA) in the brain, and his work was key in demonstrating GABA as the main inhibitory neurotransmitter in the mammalian central nervous system
- Elizabeth S. Russell, biologist in the field of mammalian developmental genetics
- Shirley E. Schwartz, inducted into the Michigan Women's Hall of Fame in 1996 for her accomplishments in the field of chemistry
- Frank Spitzer, Austrian-born American mathematician who made fundamental contributions to probability theory, including the theory of random walks, fluctuation theory, percolation theory, the Wiener sausage, and especially the theory of interacting particle systems
- Michael Stryker, neuroscientist specializing in studies of how spontaneous neural activity organizes connections in the developing mammalian brain
- Kapila Vatsyayan, a leading scholar of Indian classical dance, art, architecture, and art history; served as a member of parliament and as a bureaucrat in India;, and also served as the founding director of the Indira Gandhi National Centre for the Arts
- Mary Jane West-Eberhard, theoretical biologist noted for arguing that phenotypic and developmental plasticity played a key role in shaping animal evolution and speciation
- Eugene C. Whitney, power engineer who designed hydroelectric turbines and generators at Westinghouse Electric Company; the pinnacle of his career was the machinery for the expansion of the Grand Coulee Dam to add the #3 Powerhouse in 1966–74
- Henry T. Wright, Albert Clanton Spaulding Distinguished University Professor of Anthropology in the Department of Anthropology; Curator of Near Eastern Archaeology in the Museum of Anthropology at the University of Michigan
- Robert Wurtz, neuroscientist working as a NIH Distinguished Scientist and chief of the section on visuomotor integration at the National Eye Institute
- James Wyngaarden, director of National Institutes of Health 1982–1989
- Melinda A. Zeder, archaeologist and curator emeritus in the Department of Anthropology of the National Museum of Natural History, Smithsonian Institution
- George Zweig, Russian-American physicist; trained as a particle physicist under Richard Feynman; introduced, independently of Murray Gell-Mann, the quark model (although he named the constituent components "aces")

== Newsmakers ==
- Bill Ayers (BA 1968), co-founder of the radical Weathermen
- Benjamin Bolger (BA 1994), said to hold the largest number of graduate degrees held by a living person
- Mamah Borthwick (BA 1892), mistress of architect Frank Lloyd Wright who was murdered at his studio, Taliesin
- Napoleon Chagnon (Ph.D.), anthropologist, professor of anthropology
- Rima Fakih (BA), 2010 Miss USA
- Geoffrey Fieger (BA, MA), attorney based in Southfield, Michigan
- Robert Groves (Ph.D. 1975), 2009 Presidential nominee to head the national census; nomination stalled by Republican opposition to use of "sampling" methodology, which Groves had already stated would not be used
- Janet Guthrie (COE: BSc Physics 1960), inducted into the International Motorsports Hall of Fame in 2006; first woman to race in the Indianapolis 500; still is the only woman to ever lead a Nextel Cup race; top rookie in five different races in 1977 including the Daytona 500 and at Talladega; author of autobiography Janet Guthrie: A Life at Full Throttle
- Jerald F. ter Horst (BA 1947), briefly President Ford's press secretary
- Alireza Jafarzadeh, whistle-blower of Iran's alleged nuclear weapons program when he exposed in August 2002 the nuclear sites in Natanz and Arak, and triggered the inspection of the Iranian nuclear sites by the UN for the first time; author of The Iran Threat: President Ahmadinejad and the Coming Nuclear Crisis
- Carol Jantsch (BFA 2006), the sole female tuba player on staff with a major U.S. orchestra, believed to be the first in history; at 21, the youngest member of the Philadelphia Orchestra
- Morris Ketchum Jessup (MS Astronomy), author of ufological writings; played role in "uncovering" the so-called "Philadelphia Experiment"
- Adolph Mongo (BGS 1976), political consultant
- Jerry Newport (BA Mathematics), author with Asperger syndrome whose life was the basis for the 2005 feature-length movie Mozart and the Whale; named "Most Versatile Calculator" in the 2010 World Calculation Cup
- Jane Scott, rock critic for The Plain Dealer in Cleveland, Ohio; covered every major local rock concert; until her retirement in 2002 she was known as "The World's Oldest Rock Critic;" influential in bringing the Rock and Roll Hall of Fame to Cleveland
- Robert Shiller (BA 1967), economist; author of Irrational Exuberance
- Jerome Singleton (COE: IEOR), Paralympic athlete, competing mainly in category T44 (single below knee amputation) sprint events
- Madelon Stockwell (BA 1872), first woman to graduate from the University of Michigan

== Not-for-profit ==
- Gwendolyn Calvert Baker (BS 1964, MA 1968, Ph.D., 1972), educator, member of the New York Board of Education, national director of the YWCA and UNICEF
- Larry Brilliant (SPH: MPH 1977, Economic Development and Health Planning), head of Google Foundation (holds assets of $1Bn); co-founder of the Well; in 1979 he founded the Seva Foundation, which has given away more than $100 million; CEO of SoftNet Systems Inc., a global broadband Internet services company in San Francisco that at its peak had more than 500 employees and $600 million capitalization
- Mark Malloch Brown (MA), Chef de Cabinet, no.2 rank in the United Nations system; deputy secretary-general
- Edgar Fiedler (1929–2003), economist
- Stephen Goldsmith (LAW: JD), Marion County district attorney for 12 years; two-term mayor of Indianapolis (1992–1999); appointed senior fellow at the Milken Institute (economic think tank) in 2006; his work in Indianapolis has been cited as a national model
- Lisa Hamilton (LAW: JD), named in 2007 president of the UPS Foundation; previously its program director
- Bill Ivey (BA 1966), chairman of the National Endowment for the Arts 1998–2001, credited with restoring the agency's credibility with Congress; appointed by President Clinton
- Bob King (BA 1968), president of the UAW
- Michael D. Knox (MSW 1971, MA 1973, PhD psychology 1974), chair and CEO of the US Peace Memorial Foundation and distinguished professor, University of South Florida
- Rajiv Shah (AB), former director of agricultural development for the Bill & Melinda Gates Foundation, nominated in 2009 as chief scientist at the United States Department of Agriculture and undersecretary of agriculture for research, education and economics; administrator for the United States Agency for International Development
- Jack Vaughn, United States Peace Corps director
- Mark Weisbrot (Ph.D., economics), economist and co-director of the Center for Economic and Policy Research in Washington, D.C.; co-author, with Dean Baker, of Social Security: The Phony Crisis

== Pulitzer Prize winners ==
As of 2022, 35 of Michigan's matriculants have been awarded a Pulitzer Prize. By alumni count, Michigan ranks fifth (as of 2018) among all schools whose alumni have won Pulitzers.

- Natalie Angier (MDNG), Pulitzer Prize for Beat Reporting studied for two years at Michigan; nonfiction writer; science journalist for The New York Times; won 1991
- Ray Stannard Baker (LAW: attended 1891), Pulitzer Prize for Biography or Autobiography published 15 volumes about Wilson and internationalism, including an 8-volume biography, the last two volumes of which won the 1940 Pulitzer Prize
- Leslie Bassett (1956: DMA), won the 1966 Pulitzer Prize for Music, for Variations for Orchestra, premiered in Rome in 1963 by the RAI Symphony Orchestra under Feruccio Scaglia
- Howard W. Blakeslee (A.B. 1935), won the Pulitzer Prize for Reporting in 1937; the Associated Press's first full-time science reporter
- Edwin G. Burrows (BA 1964), won the 1999 Pulitzer Prize for History for Gotham: A History of New York City to 1898
- George Crumb (MUSIC: PhD 1959), composer and 1968 Pulitzer Prize for Music
- Sheri Fink (BS 1990), 2010 Pulitzer Prize for Investigative Reporting for The Deadly Choices at Memorial
- Robin Givhan (MA journalism), 2006 Pulitzer Prize for Criticism
- Amy Harmon (BA), 2008 Pulitzer Prize for Explanatory Reporting for a series titled "The DNA Age"
- Stephen Henderson (BA 1992), former editorial page editor for The Michigan Daily, won Pulitzer Prize for Commentary in 2014; as Editorial Page Editor of the Detroit Free Press, he was honored for his reports on the bankruptcy of Detroit
- Azmat Khan (BA 2007), winner of 2022 Pulitzer Prize in International Reporting
- Charlie LeDuff (BA), one of several reporters who worked on the New York Times series "How Race is Lived in America", which won a Pulitzer Prize for National Reporting in 2001
- David Levering Lewis (MDNG), historian; two-time winner of the Pulitzer Prize for Biography or Autobiography
- Leonard Levy (BA), obtained his undergraduate degree from the University of Michigan and his Ph.D. from Columbia University; won a Pulitzer Prize for History in 1969 for his Origins of the Fifth Amendment in 1969
- Stanford Lipsey (AB 1948), publisher of the Sun Newspaper Group and The Buffalo News; Pulitzer Prize for Investigative Journalism 1972
- Ann Marie Lipinski (1994), former editor of the Chicago Tribune; 1987 Pulitzer Prize for Local Reporting winner
- Joseph Livingston (A.B. 1925), business journalist and economist known for his long-running syndicated economics column for which he received a 1965 Pulitzer Prize for International Reporting
- Andrew C. McLaughlin (BA JD); author of A Constitutional History of the United States, winner of 1936 Pulitzer Prize for History
- William McPherson (MDNG 1951–1955), Pulitzer Prize for Distinguished Criticism in 1977
- Arthur Miller (AB 1938), playwright; Pulitzer Prize for Drama and Tony Award-winning author
- Howard Moss (1939–1940), won the Pulitzer Prize for Poetry for Selected Poems in 1971
- Edgar Ansel Mowrer (AB 1913), winner of the 1933 Pulitzer Prize for Correspondence; journalist and author known for his writings on international events
- Paul Scott Mowrer (1906–1908, Honorary Doctor of Letters 1941), journalist; Pulitzer Prize for Correspondence winner in 1929
- Lisa Pollak (BA 1990), journalist; won the 1997 Pulitzer Prize for Feature Writing
- Roger Reynolds (COE: BSE), composer; his 25-minute-long piece for string orchestra, Whispers out of Time, won the 1989 Pulitzer Prize for Music
- Eugene Robinson, Michigan Daily co-editor-in-chief in 1973–74; awarded a Pulitzer Prize for Commentary in April 2009 for his Washington Post commentaries on the 2008 presidential campaign
- Theodore Roethke (AB 1929, MA), poet; winner of the 1954 Pulitzer Prize for Poetry for his collection The Waking
- Jeffrey Seller, producer of the musicals Rent and Hamilton
- Heather Ann Thompson (BA, MA), Pulitzer Prize for History; historian, author, activist, and speaker
- David C. Turnley (BA 1977), photographer, winner of the Pulitzer Prize for Feature Photography
- Claude H. Van Tyne (BA 1896), 1930 Pulitzer Prize for History for his book The War of Independence
- Michael Vitez, journalism fellow, winner of Pulitzer Prize in Explanatory Journalism; journalist, author
- Josh White, journalist; worked with a team covering the Virginia Tech shooting massacre, which won the 2008 Pulitzer Prize
- Roger Wilkins (AB 1953, LAW: LLB 1956, HLHD 1993), journalist of the Washington Post; shared the Pulitzer Prize for his Watergate editorials
- Julia Wolfe (BA), composer; winner of a 2015 Pulitzer Prize for Music
- Taro Yamasaki (MDNG), winner of the Pulitzer Prize for Feature Photography

== Rhodes Scholars ==
As of 2021, Michigan had matriculated 30 Rhodes Scholars. Some notable winners are linked below.

- James K. Watkins, 1911
- Brand Blanshard, 1913
- Albert C. Jacobs, 1921
- Bertrand Harris Bronson, 1922
- Allan Seager, 1930
- Samuel Beer, 1932
- Wilfred Sellars, 1934
- R. V. Roosa, 1939
- Abdul El-Sayed, 2009

== Religion ==
- Charles Gilchrist Adams, senior pastor at Hartford Memorial Baptist Church in Detroit 1969–2019
- Harold David Burton, thirteenth presiding bishop of the Church of Jesus Christ of Latter-day Saints 1995–2012
- John Burgess (BA 1930, MA 1931, Hon DHum 1963), twelfth bishop of the Episcopal Diocese of Massachusetts in Boston, Massachusetts 1970–1975; first African-American to head an Episcopal diocese
- Ernest Joseph Dennen, rector of St. Stephen's Memorial Episcopal Church in Lynn, Massachusetts 1905–1914; former archdeacon of Boston; rector of Christ Church in the City of Boston 1927–1929
- Robert J. McClory, bishop of the Roman Catholic Diocese of Gary in Indiana
- Thomas K. Ray, ninth bishop of the Episcopal Diocese of Northern Michigan
- Rayford Ray, eleventh and current bishop of the Episcopal Diocese of Northern Michigan
- Robert John Rose, bishop of the Roman Catholic Diocese of Grand Rapids in Michigan 1989–2003; bishop of the Roman Catholic Diocese of Gaylord in Michigan 1981–1989
- John George Vlazny (MA 1967), tenth archbishop of the Roman Catholic Archdiocese of Portland in Oregon 1997–2013; bishop of the Roman Catholic Diocese of Winona in Minnesota 1987–1997

== Science ==
- Isabella Abbott (MS 1942), ethnobotanist, specialized in algae; more than 200 algae owe their discovery and scientific names to her
- Werner Emmanuel Bachmann (Ph.D. 1926), chemist; pioneer in steroid synthesis; carried out the first total synthesis of a steroidal hormone, equilenin; winner of a Guggenheim award
- Yıldız Bayazıtoğlu (M.Sc. 1969, Ph.D. 1974), first woman to earn doctorate of engineering at University of Michigan; v of the American Society of Mechanical Engineers, fellow of the American Association for the Advancement of Science; Harry S. Cameron Chair in Mechanical Engineering at Rice University
- Frank Benford (1910), an electrical engineer and physicist known for Benford's Law, also devised in 1937 an instrument for measuring the refraction index of glass
- John Joseph Bittner (Ph.D. 1930), geneticist and cancer biologist, made contributions on the genetics of breast cancer
- John M. Carpenter (M.S. 1958, Ph.D. 1963), nuclear engineer, fellow of the American Association for the Advancement of Science
- Rajeshwari Chatterjee (Ph.D. 1953), pioneer in Indian microwave engineering
- Christine L. Clouser (M.S., Ph.D.), virologist
- Carol McDonald Connor (Ph.D. 2002), educational psychologist with contributions to early literacy and reading comprehension research
- Bernhard Dawson (B.S., Ph.D. 1933), U.S.-born Argentinian astronomer; namesake of Dawson crater
- David Mathias Dennison, physicist who made contributions to quantum mechanics, spectroscopy, and the physics of molecular structure; Guggenheim award winner
- Gerald R. Dickens (Ph.D. 1996), professor of Earth Science at Rice University
- Charles Fremont Dight (MED 1879), medical professor; promoter of the human eugenics movement in Minnesota
- William Gould Dow (COE: MSE 1929), pioneer in electrical engineering, space research, and nuclear engineering; former chairman of EECS Department
- Douglas J. Futuyma (Ph.D.), author of the widely used textbook Evolutionary Biology, and Science on Trial: The Case for Evolution, an introduction to the creation–evolution controversy; president of the Society for the Study of Evolution; president of the American Society of Naturalists; editor of Evolution and the Annual Review of Ecology and Systematics; received Sewall Wright Award from the American Society of Naturalists; Guggenheim Fellow; Fulbright Fellow; member of National Academy of Sciences
- Frank Gill (BS, PhD 1969), ornithologist; author of the standard textbook Ornithology; editor of the encyclopedic series Birds of North America; former president of the American Ornithologists' Union
- Moses Gomberg (PhD 1894), U-M professor of chemistry; discovered organic free radicals in 1900
- Pilar González i Duarte (MS), chemist; president, Catalan Society of Chemistry
- Billi Gordon, PhD (BGS 1997), works in functional neuroimaging and brain research at the David Geffen School of Medicine at UCLA; investigates the pathophysiology of stress as antecedent to obesity-related diseases at the UCLA Gail and Gerald Oppenheimer Family Center for the Neurobiology of Stress; included on list of "30 Most Influential Neuroscientists Alive Today"
- Arnold B. Grobman (B.A.), zoologist
- Martin Harwit (MS), studied under Fred Hoyle; designed the first liquid-helium-cooled rockets for boosting telescopes into the atmosphere; investigated airborne infrared astronomy and infrared spectroscopy for NASA; Bruce Medal 2007; National Air and Space Museum Director 1987–95
- Clara H. Hasse (Ph B 1903), botanist
- Duff Holbrook (M.S.), wildlife biologist and forester, reintroduced wild turkeys to much of South Carolina
- Jerome Horwitz (Ph.D.), developed AZT, an antiviral compound used in the treatment of AIDS
- Edward Israel (AB 1881), astronomer and Arctic explorer
- Diane Larsen-Freeman (Ph.D.), linguist
- Bogart Leashore (Ph.D. 1979), sociologist, social worker; dean of the Hunter College school of social work (1991–2003)
- Zachary J. Lemnios (COE: BSEE), director of Defense Research and Engineering; former chief technology officer at MIT Lincoln Laboratory
- Armin O. Leuschner (BS Math 1888), astronomer at Berkeley, first graduate student at Lick Observatory; devised a simplification of differential corrections; improved the methodology for determining the courses of planetoids and comets; oversaw a survey of all the known minor planets; founded the Astronomy Department at Berkeley and served as director of its student observatory for 40 years, which was renamed in his honor days after his death; James Craig Watson Medal 1916; Bruce Medal 1936; American Astronomical Society; namesake of Asteroid 1361 Leuschneria
- Efrat Lifshitz (M.Sc. 1981, Ph.D. 1984), professor of chemistry at the Technion – Israel Institute of Technology
- Yuei-An Liou, distinguished professor and director at the Center for Space and Remote Sensing Research, National Central University, Taiwan
- Jane Claire Marks, conservation ecologist and educator, professor of Aquatic Ecology at Northern Arizona University, lead scientist in the PBS documentary A River Reborn: The Restoration of Fossil Creek
- Samuel Ottmar Mast (BS 1899), zoologist
- J. Ward Moody (Ph.D. 1986), professor of astronomy at Brigham Young University (BYU), principal author of the textbook Physical Science Foundations, worked on large-scale structure of the universe
- Homer A. Neal (PhD 1966), director of the ATLAS Project; board member, Ford Motors (1997–); Smithsonian Institution Board of Regents
- Harald Herborg Nielsen (Ph.D.), physicist who performed pioneering research in molecular infrared spectra
- Antonia Novello (MED: 1974), first female US Surgeon General
- Frederick George Novy (BS 1886, MS 1887, ScD 1890, MED: MD 1891), bacteriologist
- James Arthur Oliver (MSC 1937; Ph.D. 1942), herpetologist; director of the Bronx Zoo, the American Museum of Natural History and the New York Aquarium; the only person ever to have held the directorship at all three institutions
- Donald Othmer (MSC 1925; Ph.D. 1927), co-founded and co-edited the 27-volume Kirk—Othmer Encyclopedia of Chemical Technology in 1947; chairman of Polytechnic University Chemical Engineering Department (1937–1961); invented the Othmer still, which concentrated the acetic acid needed to produce cellulose acetate for motion picture film; awarded 40 patents at Kodak
- Raymond Pearl (Ph.D. 1902), one of the founders of biogerontology
- Henry Pollack (Ph.D. 1963), emeritus professor of geophysics at the University of Michigan
- Albert Benjamin Prescott (MED: 1864), chemist; dean of the school of pharmacy in 1876; director of the chemical laboratory in 1884; president of the American Chemical Society in 1886; president of the American Association for the Advancement of Science in 1891; president of the American Pharmaceutical Association in 1900
- Edwin William Schultz (A.B. 1914), pathologist; Guggenheim award winner
- Shirley E. Schwartz (BS 1957), chemist and research scientist at General Motors
- Homi Sethna (M.A. 1946), former chairman of Atomic Energy Commission of India; in 1976 became the first chairman of Maharashtra Academy of Sciences in Pune, Maharashtra
- Joseph Beal Steere (A.B. 1868), ornithologist
- Marie Tharp (MS Geology), oceanographic cartographer whose work paved the way for the theories of plate tectonics and continental drift
- Catherine Troisi (Ph.D. 1980), epidemiologist
- Juris Upatnieks (MSE EE 1965), with Emmett Leith created the first working hologram in 1962
- Steven G. Vandenberg (Ph.D. 1955), behavior geneticist
- James McDonald Vicary, market researcher; pioneered the notion of subliminal advertising in 1957
- Catherine Colello Walker (Ph.D. 2013), glaciologist at Woods Hole Oceanographic Institute
- James Craig Watson (BA 1857, MA 1859), astronomer, established the James Craig Watson Medal
- John V. Wehausen (BS 1934, MS 1935, Ph.D. 1938), researcher in hydrodynamics
- Kathleen Weston (BS Biology 1929), world-renowned toxicologist, worked on the Salk polio vaccine, taught from the Sunday school level to the medical school level for over 50 years
- Nancy Wexler (Ph.D. 1974), geneticist, Higgins Professor of Neuropsychology at Columbia University
- Terry Jean Wilson (BS), Antarctic researcher
- Ta You Wu (Ph.D. 1933), "the father of Chinese physics"
- Zhu Guangya (Chinese: 朱光亚 (Ph.D. 1950), nuclear physicist; academician of Chinese Academy of Sciences; vice chairman of 8th and 9th Chinese People's Political Consultative Conference; led the development of China's atomic and hydrogen bomb programs
- George Zweig (BS 1959), graduate student when he published "the definitive compilation of elementary particles and their properties" in 1963, the work that led up to his theory about the existence of quarks in 1964; considered to have developed the theory of quarks independently of Murray Gell-Mann

=== National Medal of Science Laureates/National Medal of Technology and Innovation ===
- Fay Ajzenberg-Selove, German-American nuclear physicist winner of the National Medal of Science
- Detlev Wulf Bronk, credited with establishing biophysics as a recognized discipline winner of the National Medal of Science
- John W. Cahn, scientist, winner of the 1998 National Medal of Science
- Stanley Cohen (Ph.D.), biochemist; 1986 Nobel Prize Laureate in Physiology and Medicine winner of the National Medal of Science
- Carl R. de Boor, German-American mathematician winner of the National Medal of Science
- George Dantzig (M.A.), mathematician called by some the "father of linear programming" winner of the National Medal of Science
- Harry George Drickamer, born Harold George Weidenthal, pioneer experimentalist in high-pressure studies of condensed matter winner of the National Medal of Science
- Roger L. Easton (MDNG), physicist; principal inventor and designer of the Global Positioning System, along with Ivan A. Getting and Bradford Parkinson; awarded the National Medal of Technology and Innovation in 2006
- Donald N. Frey (Ph.D.), Ford Motor Company product manager; National Medal of Technology winner
- Willis M. Hawkins, aeronautical engineer for Lockheed for over fifty years winner of the National Medal of Science
- George W. Housner, authority on earthquake engineering; National Medal of Science laureate
- Clarence L. Johnson, system engineer, aeronautical innovator winner of the National Medal of Science
- Isabella L. Karle, x-ray crystallographer winner of the National Medal of Science
- Dr. Donald L. Katz (Ph.D.), chemist, chemical engineer winner of the National Medal of Science
- Marshall Warren Nirenberg (Ph.D.), biochemist and geneticist winner of the National Medal of Science
- Michael Posner, psychologist winner of the National Medal of Science
- Claude E. Shannon, mathematician, electronic engineer, cryptographer; "the father of information theory" winner of the National Medal of Science
- Isadore Singer, Institute Professor in the Department of Mathematics at MIT winner of the National Medal of Science
- Stephen Smale, mathematician winner of the National Medal of Science
- Karen K. Uhlenbeck, professor of mathematics winner of the National Medal of Science
- Donald Dexter Van Slyke (Ph.D.), Dutch American biochemist winner of the National Medal of Science
- Charles M. Vest (Ph.D.), educator and engineer; president of the Massachusetts Institute of Technology 1990–2004; winner of the 2006 National Medal of Technology and Innovation

== Sloan Research Fellows ==
- James Andreoni (born 1959), professor in the Economics Department of the University of California, San Diego, where he directs the EconLab
- John Avise (born 1948), evolutionary geneticist, conservationist, ecologist and natural historian
- Robert Berner (November 25, 1935 – January 10, 2015), scientist known for his contributions to the modeling of the carbon cycle
- Allan M. Collins, cognitive scientist, professor emeritus of Learning Sciences at Northwestern University's School of Education and Social Policy
- Ralph Louis Cohen (born 1952), mathematician, specializing in algebraic topology and differential topology
- Michael D. Fried, mathematician working in the geometry and arithmetic of families of nonsingular projective curve covers
- William L. Jungers (born November 17, 1948), anthropologist, distinguished teaching professor and the chair of the Department of Anatomical Sciences at State University of New York at Stony Brook on Long Island, New York
- Jeffrey MacKie-Mason, economist specializing in information, incentive-centered design and public policy
- Gaven Martin FRSNZ FASL FAMS (born 8 October 1958), New Zealand mathematician
- George J. Minty Jr. (September 16, 1929 – August 6, 1986), mathematician, specializing in mathematical analysis and discrete mathematics; known for the Klee-Minty cube and the Browder-Minty theorem
- Alison R. H. Narayan (born 1984), chemist; William R. Roush assistant professor in the Department of Chemistry at the University of Michigan College of Literature, Science, and the Arts
- Homer Neal (June 13, 1942 – May 23, 2018), particle physicist and a distinguished professor at the University of Michigan
- Hugh David Politzer (born August 31, 1949), theoretical physicist and the Richard Chace Tolman Professor of Theoretical Physics at the California Institute of Technology
- Jessica Purcell, mathematician specializing in low-dimensional topology whose research topics have included hyperbolic Dehn surgery and the Jones polynomial
- Donald Sarason (January 26, 1933 – April 8, 2017), mathematician who made fundamental advances in the areas of Hardy space theory and VMO
- Stephen Smale (born July 15, 1930), mathematician, known for his research in topology, dynamical systems and mathematical economics
- Richard Smalley (June 6, 1943 – October 28, 2005), Gene and Norman Hackerman Professor of Chemistry and a professor of Physics and Astronomy at Rice University
- Karen E. Smith (born 1965), mathematician, specializing in commutative algebra and algebraic geometry
- James Stasheff (born January 15, 1936), mathematician
- Chelsea Walton, mathematician whose research interests include noncommutative algebra, noncommutative algebraic geometry, symmetry in quantum mechanics, Hopf algebras, and quantum groups
- Zhouping Xin (Chinese: 辛周平; born 13 July 1959), Chinese mathematician and the William M.W. Mong Professor of Mathematics at the Chinese University of Hong Kong; specializes in partial differential equations
