= Edwin Schultz =

Edwin Schultz may refer to:

- Edwin Schultz (politician) (1898–1969), American politician from Nebraska
- Edwin William Schultz (1888–1971), American pathologist

== See also ==
- Ed Schultz (1954–2018), American political commentator
