= Maureen Greenwood =

American human rights activist

Maureen Greenwood-Basken is an American human rights activist.

She has an undergraduate degree in psychology and Slavic Studies from the University of Michigan; and a master's degree in international relations from the University of Chicago.

Maureen is currently director of policy initiatives, women and population program at the United Nations Foundation. She previously served as the advocacy director for Europe and Eurasia in the Washington office of Amnesty International, where she promoted the role of human rights issues in United States foreign policy. In that position, Greenwood testified in the United States Congress, drafted legislation, advised the administration, and was a frequent media spokesperson on human rights issues. She also developed issue-based advocacy coalitions and organized Amnesty International's grassroots membership to influence US government policy and bring awareness to human rights issues.

Greenwood developed created draft legislation on US exports of crime control equipment that can be used in torture and on US assistance to Central Asia. Greenwood is playing a leadership role in Amnesty International's current campaign to promote human rights in Russia, "Justice for All". In March 2003 she participated in a Moscow press conference and non-governmental organization (NGO) roundtable on ethnic discrimination and racism in Russia.

Greenwood has been traveling to the former Soviet Union since 1986. From 1993-1995 she served in Moscow as the U.S. representative of the Union of Councils' Russian-American Bureau on Human Rights. She researched human rights issues, published articles in UCSJ's Monitor, collaborated with Russian parliamentarians and NGOs, and traveled extensively to meet regional human rights defenders, human rights victims and religious leaders. From 1996-1997 she served as the director for research and advocacy for the Union of Councils, where she researched and edited the 250-page report, Anti-Semitism in the Former Soviet Union, 1995-1997.

She is a native of Chicago. She is the daughter of Amy and Glenn Greenwood. She has one brother, Kim David Greenwood. She is married to journalist, Paul Basken. She has two children.

== Awards ==
The United Nations Association of the National Capital Area awarded Ms. Greenwood the "Human Rights Award" in December 2002.
