= Jane Claire Marks =

American conservation ecologist

- Education: University of California, Berkeley
- Scientific career
- Fields: Aquatic ecology and restoration
- Workplaces: Northern Arizona University

Jane Claire Marks is an American conservation ecologist and educator. She holds the title of Professor of Aquatic Ecology at Northern Arizona University. She is known for her scientific research about food webs and dam removals and for her work in education and outreach.

== Education and early career ==
Marks received her Bachelor of Arts in English Literature at the University of Michigan in Ann Arbor. She received her Masters of Science in Biology from Bowling Green State University, with a thesis on Interactive Effects of Nitrogen and Phosphorus on Structuring Periphyton She received her PhD in Integrative Biology at the University of California, Berkeley, with a thesis on Ecology and Genetics of Freshwater Algae, advised by ecologist Mary E. Power. Marks’ PhD work showed how floods and nutrients influence the length of food chains in rivers. She pursued postdoctoral work in conservation and policy through a Diplomacy Fellowship and an Overseas Diplomacy Fellowship from the American Association for the Advancement of Science, focusing her work at the intersection of ecological sciences and conservation.

== Research ==
Marks studies food web ecology and river restoration. Her work evaluates how trees and aquatic organisms influence the flows of carbon and nutrients in rivers and through the land-water system. Her work challenges the idea that rapidly decomposing leaves promote energy transfer up the food chain, instead showing that leaves that decompose more slowly increase energy transfer to higher trophic levels. Marks is also known for her work about tradeoffs around dam removal, such as the benefit of restoring fish habitat compared to the cost of releasing loads of accumulated sediments, sometimes contaminated, work that has been highlighted in the popular press. Her research has demonstrated that the removal of the hydropower dam in Fossil Creek, Arizona, enhanced river photosynthesis, travertine deposition, and native fish abundance. Marks has also showed how ecological processes are central to the recovery of river ecosystems from impoundment, water diversion, and the invasion of non-native species to watersheds.

== Outreach, film, and activism ==
Marks was featured as the lead scientist in the PBS documentary, A River Reborn: The Restoration of Fossil Creek, narrated by actor Ted Danson. This film describes how environmental advocates, scientists, and a major utility came together to restore a river. Marks co-produced the video documentary Parched: The Art of Water in the Southwest, and was advising scientist for the art exhibit of the same name in which nine Arizona-based artists created new works exploring social, cultural, and ecological tensions around water scarcity in the American Southwest.

Marks has been involved in efforts to promote racial justice, environmental responsibility, and human rights. From 2009-2012, Marks served as Director of the Martin-Springer Institute, which attends to the experiences of the Holocaust to relate them to today’s concerns, crises, and conflicts. Under Marks’ leadership, MSI hosted speaker series for Holocaust Remembrance Day, including Spike Lee, Winona LaDuke and Cornel West. As MSI Director, Marks hosted a public debate and promoted an open letter contesting Arizona’s controversial immigration bill, SB 1070, of which many of the controversial provisions were later struck down by the Supreme Court.
