= Hyuck Kwon =

Korean-American electrical engineer (born 1954)

Hyuck M. Kwon (born May 9, 1954) is a professor in Electrical Engineering and Computer Science at Wichita State University, Wichita, Kansas. His research focuses on wireless communications, CDMA, and MIMO.

== Biography ==
Kwon was born in South Korea. He received B.S. and M.S. degrees in electrical engineering from Seoul National University in 1978 and 1980, respectively. He received a Ph.D. degree in computer, information, and control engineering from the University of Michigan at Ann Arbor, in 1984 under the supervision of Theodore Birdsall with a thesis "Digital Coding For Underwater Acoustic Multipath Channels”.

From 1985 to 1989, he was with the University of Wisconsin, Milwaukee, as an assistant professor in Electrical Engineering and Computer Science Department. From 1989 to 1993, he was with the Lockheed Engineering and Sciences Company, Houston, Texas, as a principal engineer, working for NASA Space Shuttle and Space Station satellite communication systems. Since 1993, he has been with the Electrical and Computer Engineering Department of Wichita State University where he is now a full professor. In addition, he held several visiting and consulting positions at communication system industries, was a visiting associate professor at Texas A&M University, College Station in 1997, and a visiting professor at KAIST, in Daejeon, South Korea in 2005.

== Publications ==
Kwon has over 140 refereed publications in IEEE journals and conference proceedings. His most cited publications are:

- Tayem N, Kwon HM. L-shape 2-dimensional arrival angle estimation with propagator method. IEEE transactions on antennas and propagation. 2005 May 9;53(5):1622-30. Cited 318 times according to Google Scholar.
- Kwon HM. Optical orthogonal code-division multiple-access system. I. APD noise and thermal noise. IEEE Transactions on Communications. 1994 Jul;42(7):2470-9. . Cited times 234 according to Google Scholar.
- Tayem N, Kwon HM. Conjugate esprit (c-sprit). IEEE Transactions on Antennas and Propagation. 2004 Oct 8;52(10):2618-24. Cited 89 times according to Google Scholar.
