= George Zhibin Gu =

Chinese journalist and consultant (born 1961)

George Zhibin Gu is a Chinese journalist and consultant.

George Zhibin Gu is well known for his provocative analysis and journalism on Chinese politics, economy, history, and business, and its evolving relations with the world.

He is a Chinese native, born in 1961 in Xi'an in central China. Though he was brought up during China’s bloody cultural revolution period, he has been able to gain education both inside China and in the U.S in the reform era: having gone through Nanjing University in China and Vanderbilt University and the University of Michigan in the United States.

He holds two MS degrees and a PhD from the University of Michigan. He has done some business dealings for decades though journalism and analysis on public affairs seem to be his best strength.

== Publications ==
He writes for numerous international media outlets and has authored four books:

- China and the New World Order
- China’s Global Reach.
- Made in China.
- China Beyond Deng: Reforms in the People’s Republic of China, which are all banned inside his native land.
