= Zuhair Nashed =

M. Zuhair Nashed (born May 14, 1936, in Aleppo, Syria) is an American mathematician, working on integral and operator equations, inverse and ill-posed problems, numerical and nonlinear functional analysis, optimization and approximation theory, operator theory, optimal control theory, signal analysis, and signal processing.

== Career ==
Zuhair Nashed received his Master of Science degree in electrical engineering from Massachusetts Institute of Technology in 1958, and his Doctor of Philosophy degree in mathematics, from the University of Michigan Ann Arbor in 1963.

He started his academic career in 1963 as an assistant professor at Georgia Institute of Technology, Atlanta, and was promoted to associate professor in 1965 and to full professor in 1969. He moved to the University of Delaware in 1977 to hold the position of Professor of mathematics and electrical engineering. He moved to the University of Central Florida, Orlando, in 2002, where he held the position of Professor and Chair 2002 – 2006. Since 2007 he is a professor at the University Central Florida, Orlando.

In 2012 he was inducted Fellow of the American Mathematical Society.
