= Edwin William Schultz =

- Born: 1888
- Died: 1971 (aged 82–83)
- Medical career
- Field: pathology
- Awards: Guggenheim Fellowship

Edwin William Schultz (1888 Wisconsin – 1971) was an American pathologist.

He graduated from Winona College with a BS, the University of Michigan (A.B. 1914) and from Johns Hopkins University with an MD. He served in a hospital in World War I. He taught at Stanford University, from 1920 to 1953. He was a Guggenheim Fellow in 1925. He was president of the American Association of Pathologists and Bacteriologists in 1956.
