= Deaths in January 1986 =

The following is a list of notable deaths in January 1986.

Entries for each day are listed alphabetically by surname. A typical entry lists information in the following sequence:

- Name, age, country of citizenship at birth, subsequent country of citizenship (if applicable), reason for notability, cause of death (if known), and reference.

== January 1986 ==
=== 1 ===
- Albert Aley, 66, American filmmaker.
- Rattan Bai, 95, Indian actress and singer.
- Teodor Bieregowoj, 77, Polish Olympic racewalker (1936).
- Lord David Cecil, 83, British historian.
- Kenneth de Burgh Codrington, 86, British archaeologist.
- Roger Erell, 78, French architect.
- Marty Friedman, 96, American basketball player and coach.
- Bill Hall, 57, American Major League baseball player.
- Emmet Lavery, 83, American screenwriter.
- Pavao Löw, 75, Yugoslav footballer.
- Harry McQuinn, 80, American racing driver.
- Eibhlín Ní Bhriain, 60, Irish journalist.
- Bruce Norris, 61, American NHL ice hockey executive (Detroit Red Wings), liver failure.

=== 2 ===
- Leo Bensemann, 73, New Zealand artist and typographer.
- Vera Buck, 82, Australian pianist and composer.
- John Chenoweth, 88, American politician, member of the U.S. House of Representatives (1941–1949, 1951–1965).
- Patrick Vanden-Bempde-Johnstone, 4th Baron Derwent, 84, British politician and hereditary peer.
- Bob Finley, 70, American Major League baseball player.
- Hartford N. Gunn Jr., 59, American television executive (PBS), leukoencephalopathy.
- John Hargis, 65, American NBA basketball player.
- Günther Heydemann, 71, German U-boat commander.
- John Howard, 84, British civil engineer.
- Wilbur V. Hubbard, 78, American college sports coach, stroke.
- Herb Magidson, 79, American lyricist.
- Patricia Miles Martin, 86, American author.
- Percy McKelvey, 89, Canadian politician.
- Una Merkel, 82, American actress (Summer and Smoke, The Ponder Heart).
- Nonna Muravyova, 79, Soviet politician.
- Jock Richardson, 79, Scottish footballer.
- Bill Veeck, 71, American Major League baseball executive, lung cancer.
- Frithjov Meier Vik, 83, Norwegian politician.

=== 3 ===
- Dorothy Dunbar Bromley, 89, American journalist.
- Lindesay Clark, 89, Australian mining engineer and executive.
- John Cronin, 69, British politician, MP (1955–1979), heart attack.
- George G. Finch, 83, American general.
- Dustin Gee, 43, British comedian, heart attack.
- Clare W. Graves, 71, American psychologist.
- Chico Hernández, 70, Cuban Major League baseball player.
- Jimmy Ithell, 69, Welsh footballer.
- Jens Bjerre Jacobsen, 82, Danish composer.
- Georg Krause, 84, German cinematographer (Paths of Glory).
- Jim Quinn, 81, Australian rules footballer.
- Nani Wartabone, 78, Indonesian politician.
- Jan Zumbach, 70, Polish flying ace.

=== 4 ===
- Giuseppe Addobbati, 76, Italian actor.
- Gösta Bernhard, 75, Swedish actor and filmmaker.
- Henry Field, 83, American anthropologist, respiratory failure.
- Wilbur R. Franks, 84, Canadian scientist, inventor of the g-suit.
- Jan Huges, 81, Dutch Olympic rower (1928).
- Christopher Isherwood, 81, British-American writer (Goodbye to Berlin, A Single Man, Christopher and His Kind), prostate cancer.
- Jack Little, 77, American-Australian broadcaster.
- Walter K. Long, 81, American historian.
- Phil Lynott, 36, Irish musician (Thin Lizzy) and songwriter ("The Boys Are Back in Town"), sepsis.
- Lisi Mangold, 35, Swiss actress, cancer.
- Dave Morey, 96, American college sports coach.
- Edward Pugh, 76, British Anglican prelate.
- Frits Schutte, 88, Dutch Olympic swimmer (1924).
- Maskoen Soemadiredja, 78, Indonesian politician.
- J. B. H. Wadia, 84, Indian filmmaker.

=== 5 ===
- Johnnie S. Aikens, 71, American politician.
- Sir John Barlow, 2nd Baronet, 87, British politician, MP (1945–1966).
- Elena de Galantha, 95, Hungarian-American histologist.
- Joseph DiVarco, 74, American mobster.
- Thomas Heathcote, 68, British actor.
- Don McKellar, 61, Australian politician.
- Ilmari Salminen, 83, Finnish Olympic long-distance runner (1936).
- Eivind Sværen, 68, Norwegian shot putter.
- Wei Wu Wei, 90, British theatre producer and Taoist philosopher.
- Radovan Zogović, 78, Yugoslav poet.

=== 6 ===
- Ronnie Cord, 42, Brazilian singer.
- Johnny Dawson, 83, American golfer.
- Shanti Kumar Desai, 77, Indian music director.
- Jan Halle, 82, Dutch footballer.
- Christopher Jayawardena, 87, Sri Lankan conservationist.
- Frank Miller, 73, American cellist.
- Fernand Oubradous, 82, French musician.
- N. K. Seshan, 58, Indian politician.
- James E. Van Zandt, 87, American politician, member of the U.S. House of Representatives (1939–1943, 1947–1963).

=== 7 ===
- Germaine Arbeau-Bonnefoy, 92, French pianist.
- Joe Burns, 85, American Major League baseball player (Chicago White Sox).
- P. D. Eastman, 76, American children's author (Are You My Mother?, Go, Dog. Go!, Sam and the Firefly), pneumonia.
- Joe Busbey Hamiter, 86, American judge.
- Wilfred Holmes, 85, American naval officer.
- Suleiman Khater, 24–25, Egyptian mass murderer (Ras Burqa massacre), suicide by hanging.
- John C. Mandanici, 68, American politician.
- Nicholas Mormando, 41, American mobster (Gambino crime family), shot.
- Juan Rulfo, 68, Mexican author and screenwriter.
- George Sixta, 76, American cartoonist.
- Fred Thomsen, 88, American NFL football player and coach.
- Rex Wailes, 84, English historian and engineer.

=== 8 ===
- Gordon Adamson, 81, Canadian architect.
- Basil Fitzherbert, 14th Baron Stafford, 59, English hereditary peer.
- Pierre Fournier, 79, French cellist.
- Sidney Harrison, 82, British pianist and composer.
- Maria L. de Hernández, 89, Mexican-American civil rights activist.
- Henry Lillee, 74, Irish Anglican prelate.
- Josette Nevière, 52, French Olympic skier (1956).
- Neil Savaryn, 80, Russian-Canadian Greek Catholic prelate.
- Hans Schmitz, 89, German politician.
- Mansel Thomas, 76, Welsh composer.

=== 9 ===
- Jimmy Adams, 75, Scottish golfer.
- Lucia Chase, 88, American dancer and actress.
- Michel de Certeau, 60, French sociologist, pancreatic cancer.
- W. S. Graham, 67, Scottish poet.
- Harry Hopkins, 73, New Zealand civil engineer and academics administrator.
- Wilson Jones, 71, Welsh footballer.
- Rod Macalpine-Downie, 51, English sailboat designer.
- Fabio Mangilli, 74, Italian Olympic equestrian (1948).
- Carl Ross, 84, English fishing entrepreneur.
- Henry Tucker, 82, Bermudan politician.

=== 10 ===
- Ernst Angel, 91, Austrian-born American poet and screenwriter.
- Moritz Daublebsky-Sterneck, 73, Austrian humanitarian.
- Joe Farrell, 48, American jazz musician, myelodysplastic syndrome.
- Emil Forrer, 91, Swiss linguist and archaeologist.
- Eta Harich-Schneider, 91, German musicologist.
- Edward G. Janeway, 84, American politician, member of the Vermont Senate (1959–1979).
- Roy Johnson, 90, American Major League baseball player and coach.
- Joseph Kraft, 61, American journalist, heart failure.
- Ernst Lehner, 73, German footballer.
- Wilhelm Philipp, 69, German flying ace.
- Reg Rattey, 67, Australian soldier, VC recipient.
- James Terry Roach, 25, American convicted murderer, execution by electric chair.
- Ramón Sainz de Varanda, 61, Spanish politician.
- Werner Schindler, 80, Swiss architect.
- Jaroslav Seifert, 84, Czechoslovak writer, Nobel Prize recipient (1984).
- Martin Stevens, 56, British politician, MP (since 1979).
- Rogelio Tapia, 82, Spanish footballer.
- James M. Tunnell Jr., 75, American politician.
- Carlo Varetto, 80, Italian Olympic sports shooter (1936, 1956).

=== 11 ===
- Ilya Averbakh, 51, Soviet film director.
- Prescott E. Bloom, 43, American politician, house fire.
- Phil Brady, 42, American NFL football player.
- Sid Chaplin, 69, English writer.
- Robert E. Coulson, 73, American politician.
- Andrzej Czok, 37, Polish mountaineer, pulmonary edema.
- Clarence Ekstrom, 83, American naval admiral.
- Annie Hooper, 88, American sculptor.
- Kazuo Kamimura, 45, Japanese manga artist, hypopharyngeal cancer.
- Walter P. Kellenberg, 84, American Roman Catholic prelate.
- Heinz Plumanns, 83, German Olympic diver (1928).
- Henri-Charles Puech, 83, French historian.
- Maja Refsum, 88, Norwegian sculptor.
- Grover Resinger, 70, American Major League baseball coach.
- Roger Trinquier, 77, French soldier.

=== 12 ===
- Jack Andrews, 82, Northern Irish politician.
- Marcel Arland, 86, French novelist.
- Robert C. Atherton, 77, American magazine editor and publisher.
- Hinko Bauer, 77, Yugoslav architect.
- Joseph Ben-David, 65, Hungarian-Israeli sociologist.
- Ludwig Biermann, 78, German astronomer.
- Ladislao Brazionis, 56, Uruguayan footballer.
- Martin Burkenroad, 75, American marine biologist.
- Juan Carlos Corazzo, 78, Uruguayan footballer.
- Assia Dagher, 77, Lebanese-Egyptian actress.
- Bob Kaufman, 60, American poet and jazz musician, emphysema.
- Lars Leksell, 78, Swedish physician.
- Herbert Prince, 94, English footballer.
- Eduardo Risso, 60, Uruguayan Olympic rower (1948, 1952).
- Eddie Solomon, 34, American Major League baseball player, traffic collision.
- Sunawar Sukowati, 63, Indonesian politician.
- Norman Turnbull, 85, Canadian politician.
- Hoylande Young, 82, American chemist.

=== 13 ===
- Alberto Abdala, 65, Uruguayan politician, vice president (1967–1972).
- Lurline Collier, 92, American educator.
- Mike Garcia, 62, American Major League baseball player, diabetes.
- Jacqueline Groag, 82, English textile designer.
- Jan Holobrádek, 70, Czechoslovak Olympic rower (1936).
- Abdul Fattah Ismail, 46, South Yemeni politician, killed in battle.
- Pierre Mwana Kasongo, 47, Zairian footballer.
- Wilhelm Kunst, 76, German wood sculptor.
- Kevin Longbottom, 45, Australian rugby league player.
- Nicolò Tronci, 80, Italian Olympic gymnast (1936).
- Sayuri Yōko, 84, Japanese actress.

=== 14 ===
- Daniel Balavoine, 33, French singer, helicopter crash.
- William W. Hagerty, 69, American academic administrator, cancer.
- Geoffrey Herklots, 83–84, British botanist and ornithologist.
- Alv Johnsen, 66, Norwegian physician and soldier.
- Jaime Silvério Marques, 70–71, Portuguese colonial administrator, governor of Macau (1959–1962).
- Carolyn Conn Moore, 82, American politician.
- Donna Reed, 64, American actress (From Here to Eternity, It's a Wonderful Life, The Donna Reed Show), pancreatic cancer.
- Reg Reid, 86, Canadian ice hockey player (Toronto St. Patricks).
- Juan Manuel Rozas, 49–50, Spanish writer.
- Raissa Ruus, 43, Soviet Estonian Olympic runner (1972).
- Thierry Sabine, 36, French motorcycle racer, helicopter crash.
- Alfred Schlecht, 82, Swiss footballer.
- Robert Trösch, 74, Swiss actor.
- Valerian Zorin, 84, Soviet diplomat.

=== 15 ===
- Samuel Bason, 91, American politician, member of the North Carolina Senate (1947–1959).
- Alfred Bestall, 93, British cartoonist (Rupert Bear).
- Lamar Boren, 68, American cinematographer.
- Knut Brynildsen, 68, Norwegian footballer.
- Jean Cassou, 88, French poet.
- George Cobb, 71, American golf course designer.
- Jim Crowley, 83, American football player.
- Emil Hasler, 84, German art director.
- Les MacFarlane, 66, Australian politician.
- Thomas A. Maloney, 96, American politician, member of the California Senate (1925–1933) and State Assembly (1933–1957).
- Nyle McFarlane, 50, American football player.
- Anni Rehborn, 81, German swimmer.
- Vladimir Rodimushkin, 64, Soviet Olympic rower (1952).
- Fred Thomas, 93, American Major League baseball player.
- Anna Zemánková, 77, Czechoslovak painter.

=== 16 ===
- Herbert W. Armstrong, 93, American evangelist, founder of the Worldwide Church of God.
- Sir Laurence Durlacher, 81, British naval admiral.
- Mervin Glennie, 67, English cricketer.
- Eduard Götzl, 64, Czech-born German politician.
- James L. Hicks, 70, American journalist, stroke.
- Hu Yuzhi, 89, Chinese politician.
- Archie E. O'Neil, 80, American general.
- Bill Richardson, 77, British newspaper editor.
- Gene Rose, 72, American NFL football player.
- Stjepan Šulek, 71, Yugoslav Croatian composer.
- Ryūzaburō Umehara, 97, Japanese painter.
- Pearl Warren, 74, American community leader.
- Peter Waterman, 51, English boxer.

=== 17 ===
- Ernest C. Arbuckle, 73, American business leader and academic administrator, traffic collision.
- Earl Conrad, 79, American author and historian, lymphoma.
- Tommy Frame, 83, Scottish footballer.
- Robert Lyden, 43, American actor.
- A. C. N. Nambiar, 89–90, Indian diplomat.
- Halldor O. Opedal, 90, Norwegian folklorist.

=== 18 ===
- Donald Putnam Abbott, 65, American zoologist.
- Maurice Brennan, 72, British aeronautical engineer.
- Frida Clara, 77, Italian Olympic skier (1936).
- Robert MacFarlan Cole III, 96, American chemical engineer.
- Araldo di Crollalanza, 93, Italian politician.
- Walo Hörning, 75, Swiss Olympic fencer (1948).
- Lennox Johnston, 86, Scottish physician and anti-smoking advocate.
- Edwin Luke, 74, American actor.
- McKinley Mitchell, 51, American blues musician.
- Eugen Ray, 28, German sprinter, traffic collision.
- Edmundo Rivero, 74, Argentine musician.
- Nancy Wilson Ross, 84, American novelist.
- Pat Quinn, 55, English rugby union and rugby league player.
- Ishimoda Shō, 73, Japanese historian.
- Arthur Wheat, 64, English footballer.

=== 19 ===
- Gérard Caron, 69, Canadian pianist.
- Sammy Drechsel, 60, German comedian and sports broadcaster.
- Kanwar Lal Gupta, 61, Indian politician.
- E. Lowell Kelly, 80, American psychologist.
- Sam Martindale, 80, English rugby union player.
- Nikola Perlić, 73, Yugoslav footballer.
- Nino Salvo, 56, Italian businessman, cancer.
- R. Tom Sawyer, 84, American locomotive engineer.
- Hans Hartvig Seedorff, 93, Danish poet and lyricist.
- George Sinker, 85, Indian-British Anglican prelate.
- Sir Colin Syme, 82, Australian businessman and lawyer.
- Vainerere Tangatapoto, 73, Cook Islands politician.
- Carol Stuart Watson, 54, American illustrator.
- Cy Wentworth, 82, American NFL football player.
- Adam Włodek, 63, Polish poet.

=== 20 ===
- Sidney Barton, 76, British politician.
- Obrad Belošević, 57, Yugoslav basketball referee.
- Stanley George Browne, 78, British medical researcher.
- John D. Calandra, 57, American politician, heart attack.
- Sir Alec Clegg, 76, English educationalist.
- Louis Hartz, 66, American historian and political scientist, seizure.
- Theodor Hoelty-Nickel, 91, German-American musicologist.
- Robert Judd, 59–60, American actor.
- Franz Kemser, 75, German Olympic bobsledder (1952).
- Alex Munro, 74, Scottish comedian.
- Elizabeth Nickell-Lean, 77, English singer and actor.
- Grace E. Pickford, 83, British-American biologist.
- Harold John Pye, 84, British manufacturing executive.
- Tove Tellback, 86, Norwegian actress.
- Eyaz Zaxoyî, 25, Iraqi composer, tuberculosis.

=== 21 ===
- Edith Clara Batho, 90, British academic administrator.
- W. W. Behrens Jr., 63, American naval admiral and oceanographer, heart attack.
- William Bryant, 86, English footballer.
- Zuck Carlson, 81, American NFL football player (Chicago Bears).
- Mary Eristavi, 97, Russian-French aristocrat and fashion model.
- Violet B. Haas, 59, American mathematician, brain cancer.
- Tatsumi Hijikata, 57, Japanese choreographer.
- Doug Keene, 57, English footballer.
- Bogna Krasnodębska-Gardowska, 85, Polish painter.
- Martin C. Lueck, 97, American politician.
- Sir Gordon MacMillan, 89, Scottish general.
- Clara Moores, 89, American actress.
- Günther Pape, 78, German general.
- Baby Ray, 71, American NFL football player (Green Bay Packers), heart attack.
- Anders Törnkvist, 65, Swedish Olympic skier (1948, 1952).
- Ferol Sibley Warthen, 95, American painter.
- Margery Wilson, 89, American actress, stroke.

=== 22 ===
- Frederick George Beale, 79, British police officer.
- Nerissa Bowes-Lyon, 66, British aristocrat.
- Scott Dobson, 67, English art critic.
- Ilse Fromm-Michaels, 97, German pianist and composer.
- Thomas Baden Morris, 85, English playwright.
- Gilbert Roberts, 85, English naval officer.
- Mary Eleanor Spear, 88, American data visualization specialist.
- Carl Wittman, 42, American gay rights activist, suicide by drug overdose.

=== 23 ===
- Ann Andrews, 95, American actress.
- Charles Bergonzi, 75, Monegasque Olympic sports shooter (1952).
- Joseph Beuys, 64, German sculptor and art theorist, heart failure.
- Yvonne Lefébure, 87, French pianist.
- Tina Leser, 75, American fashion designer.
- Charles Moore, 57, American choreographer.
- Quinn Tamm, 75, American federal agent.
- Willard Van Dyke, 79, American filmmaker, heart attack.

=== 24 ===
- Ottorino Aloisio, 83, Italian architect.
- John Boozer, 47, American Major League baseball player (Philadelphia Phillies), Hodgkin lymphoma.
- Sir Victor Crutchley, 92, British naval admiral, VC recipient.
- Emerson LeRoy Cummings, 83, American general.
- Mary Hewins, 71, British autobiographer.
- L. Ron Hubbard, 74, American author (Dianetics: The Modern Science of Mental Health, Battlefield Earth), founder of the Church of Scientology, complications from a stroke.
- Flo Hyman, 31, American Olympic volleyball player (1984), aortic dissection.
- Masazumi Inada, 89, Japanese general.
- Niilo Juvonen, 57, Finnish Olympic skier (1952).
- Gordon MacRae, 64, American actor (Oklahoma!, On Moonlight Bay, Carousel), pneumonia.
- Matthew Francis McGuire, 87, American judge.
- Hap Perry, 89, American college sports coach.
- Alfred Schlemm, 91, German general.
- Léopold Szondi, 92, Hungarian psychologist.
- John Vaughan Wilkes, 83, English academics administrator.

=== 25 ===
- Antony Gibbs, 5th Baron Aldenham, 63, British hereditary peer.
- Robert Ancelin, 87, French actor.
- Gunnar Bergh, 76, Swedish Olympic discus thrower (1936).
- Pat Coffee, 70, American NFL football player.
- Edda Ferronao, 52, Italian actress.
- Albert Grossman, 59, American music manager (Bob Dylan, Janis Joplin, Gordon Lightfoot), heart attack.
- Alfred Huber, 75, German footballer.
- Josef Kammhuber, 89, German general.
- Bill Kraus, 38, American gay rights activist, AIDS.
- Ernst Schnabel, 72, German writer.
- Tony Scornavacca, 59, American painter, lung cancer.
- Dennis Smith, 73, New Zealand cricketer.
- Oswald J. Smith, 96, Canadian evangelist.

=== 26 ===
- Frank Camp, 80, American football player.
- José Luis Costa, 76, Spanish footballer.
- Gérard Duquet, 76, Canadian politician.
- Mercy Hatton, 95, British actress.
- George Hindori, 52, Surinamese politician.
- Katherine G. Howard, 87, American diplomat and politician.
- Bernard Lorjou, 77, French painter.
- Norman MacKenzie, 92, Canadian politician and academics administrator.
- Julien Médécin, 91, Monegasque architect.
- Nicholas Moore, 67, English poet.
- Ruben Nirvi, 80, Finnish linguist.
- Zabelle Panosian, 94, Ottoman-born American singer.
- Gertrude Warner, 68, American radio personality, cancer.

=== 27 ===
- Nikhil Banerjee, 54, Indian sitarist, heart attack.
- Arthur Llewellyn Basham, 71, British historian.
- Edward Biberman, 81, American artist, cancer.
- Lincoln Borglum, 73, American sculptor.
- Leslie William Cannon, 81, British Air Force officer.
- Worden Day, 73, American painter, printmaker, and sculptor.
- Robert Fraser, 48, English art dealer, AIDS.
- Britte Hughey, 75, American politician, member of the Mississippi House of Representatives (1956–1964).
- Karl Köther, 80, German Olympic cyclist (1928).
- Truman H. Landon, 80, American general.
- Flint Magama, Zimbabwean army officer, helicopter crash.
- Ken Moule, 60, English jazz pianist.
- Lilli Palmer, 71, German-American actress (But Not for Me), stomach cancer.
- Seán Quinn, 55–56, Irish footballer.
- Michal Vičan, 60, Czechoslovak footballer.
- George Wade, 94, English pottery manufacturer.

=== 28 ===
- Arthur Baxter, 76, Scottish cricketer.
- Richard E. Berlin, 91-92, American president and CEO of the Hearst Foundation.
- Ham Dowling, 90, American football player and roadway engineer.
- Tom Grubbs, 91, American Major League baseball player.
- James Edward Moore, 83, American general.
- Dorothée Pullinger, 92, French-British automobile engineer.
- Allen Saunders, 86, American cartoonist.
- Zonja Wallen-Lawrence, 93, Swedish-born American biochemist.
- American astronauts killed in the Space Shuttle Challenger disaster (crew of STS-51-L):
  - Gregory Jarvis, 41.
  - Christa McAuliffe, 37.
  - Ronald McNair, 35.
  - Ellison Onizuka, 39.
  - Judith Resnik, 36.
  - Dick Scobee, 46.
  - Michael J. Smith, 40.

=== 29 ===
- Arabik Baghdasarian, 46, Iranian graphic designer.
- Everett Barksdale, 75, American jazz musician.
- Kenneth Came, 60, English cricketer.
- Leif Erickson, 74, American actor, cancer.
- Edmond Leveugle, 81, French footballer.
- Manfred Metzger, 80, Swiss Olympic sailor (1960).
- Otho Prior-Palmer, 88, British politician, MP (1945–1964).
- Édouard Souberbielle, 86, French organist.

=== 30 ===
- Jean Sala Breitenstein, 85, American judge.
- Fédérico Ezquerra, 76, Spanish cyclist.
- Jessie Scott Hathcock, 91, American educator and civil rights activist.
- Alexander Hemphill, 64, American lawyer and politician.
- Nils Astrup Hoel, 86, Norwegian businessman.
- Ivan Papanin, 91, Soviet polar explorer.
- Gusztáv Sebes, 80, Hungarian footballer.
- Ray Thorburn, 55, Australian politician.
- Les Townsend, 71, Australian cricket umpire.
- Percy Vivian, 83, Canadian politician.
- Dame Jocelyn Woollcombe, 87, British naval director.

=== 31 ===
- Tom Adey, 84, English footballer.
- Bill Bryson Sr., 70, American sports journalist.
- John Moore Caldicott, 85, Zimbabwean politician.
- P. J. Conkwright, 80, American graphic designer.
- Freddie Burke Frederick, 65, American actor.
- Philip Jessup, 88, American diplomat and judge.
- Murray Kane, 70, American composer and band manager.
- Moderato, 83, Brazilian footballer.
- Dick Seabrook, 75–76, British trade unionist.
- Boris Smolar, 88, Russian-born American journalist.
- H. E. Tester, 80–81, Danish philatelist.
- Silvio Tozzi, 77, Italian Olympic wrestler (1932, 1936).
- Charles Turzak, 86, American artist.
- Arie van der Stel, 91, Dutch Olympic cyclist (1920).
- Tony Velona, 65, American songwriter.
