= Ada Salas =

Spanish poet & author (born 1965)

- Born: 1965 (age 60–61); Cáceres, Spain
- Occupation: Writer
- Known for: Poetry

Ada Salas or AdaMc (born 1965) is a Spanish poet and author. She has worked as a teacher. Her poetry is known for its inclusion of pauses.

== Life ==
Ada (Moreno) Salas was born in Cáceres, Spain in 1965. She earned a doctorate in philology at the University of Extremadura. She taught in France at the University of Angers. Juan Manuel Rozas was meant to have been her teacher, but he died in 1987. Salas entered the competition named in his memory and won the award in 1988

=== Awards and recognition ===
- 1988 Arte y memoria del inocente Salas, Ada. Published by the Universidad de Extremadura II Premio "Juan Manuel Rozas" de Poesía.
- 1994 Variaciones en blanco . the Hiperión Prize.
- 2007 Esto no es el silencio won the 15th Ricardo Molina – Ciudad de Córdoba prize.
- 2011 El margen, el error, la tachadura. Notas acerca de la escritura poética (Diputación de Badajoz) Fernando Pérez Essay Prize
- 2011 El margen, el error, la tachadura. Notas acerca de la escritura poética (Diputación de Badajoz) won the Fernando Pérez Essay Prize

=== Works ===
- Arte y memoria del inocente (1988)
- Variaciones en blanco (1994)
- La sed (1997)
- Lugar de la derrota (2003)
- Noticia de la luz
- Escuela de Arte de Mérida prose
- Alguien aquí. Notas acerca de la escritura poética
- Esto no es el silencio
- A la Misericordia y Las tinieblas by Robert Desnos - she and Juan Abeleira translated
- No duerme el animal (2009) (compilation)
- Ashes to Ashes (2010)
- Limbo y otros poemas
- Diez mandamientos
- Poesía española reciente, Cano Ballesta, Juan 1980-2000
- El margen, el error, la tachadura. Notas acerca de la escritura poética (Diputación de Badajoz)
- Salas, with Juan Abeleira, translated A la Misteriosa y Las tinieblas by the French writer Robert Desnos
- La otra joven poesía española (Igitur, 2003)
- Poesía española reciente,Cano Ballesta, Juan 1980-2000
- Descendimiento, Valencia, Pre-Textos, 2018
