= New York Amsterdam News =

African-American newspaper from Harlem, Manhattan

Amsterdam News

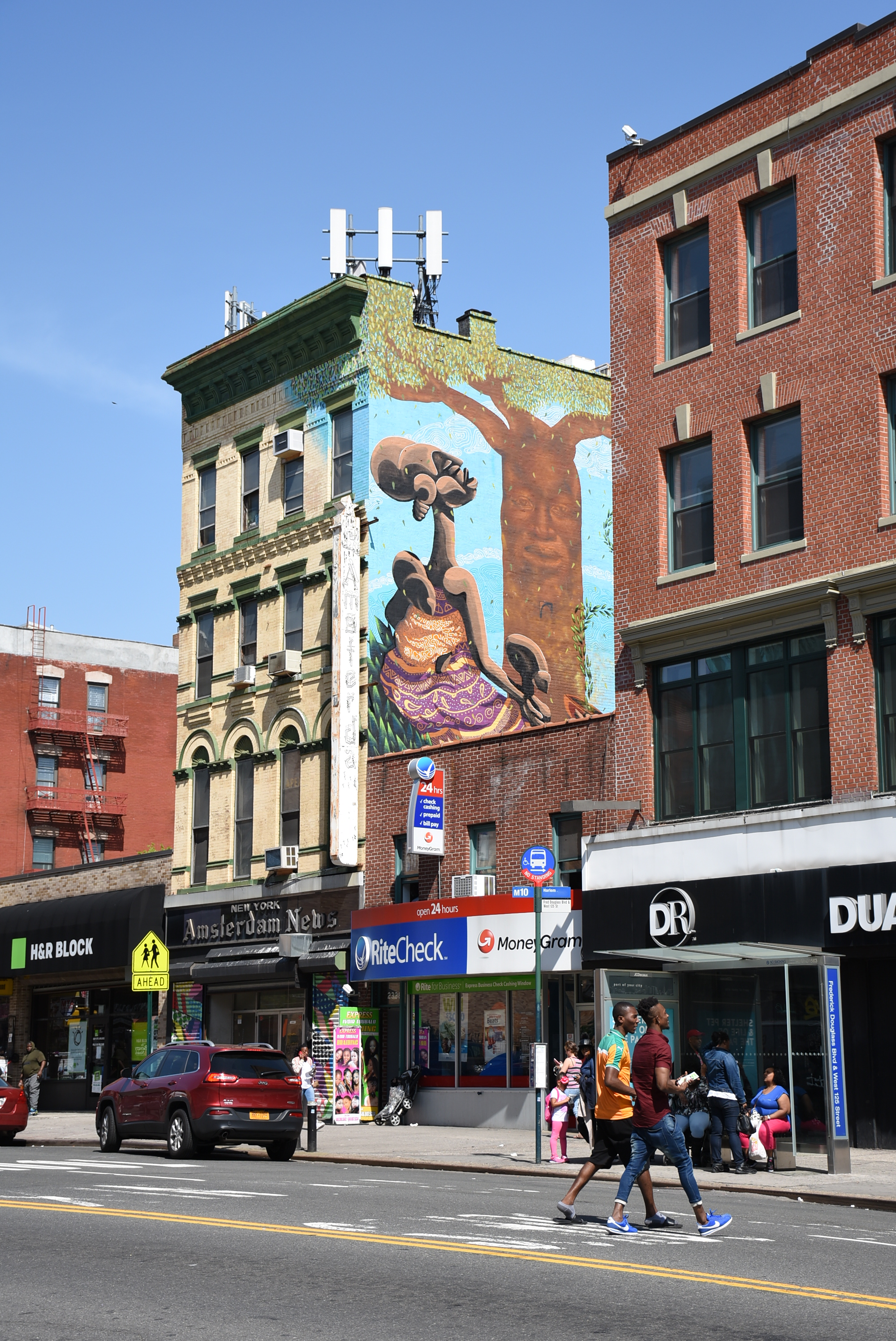
- The Amsterdam News building (center) at 2340 Frederick Douglass Boulevard in central Harlem
- Format: Tabloid weekly newspaper
- Founder: James Henry Anderson
- Publisher: Amnews Corporation
- President: Penda Howell (vice president)
- Editor: Elinor Tatum
- Managing editor: Kristin Fayne-Mulroy
- Founded: December 4, 1909; 116 years ago
- Political alignment: Black nationalism
- Language: English
- Headquarters: 2340 Frederick Douglass Boulevard; New York, NY 10027
- Circulation: 22,000 (as of 2024)
- ISSN: 1059-1818
- OCLC number: 13416782
- Website: amsterdamnews.com

The Amsterdam News (also known as New York Amsterdam News) is a weekly Black-owned newspaper serving New York City. It is one of the oldest newspapers geared toward African Americans in the United States and has published columns by such figures as W. E. B. Du Bois, Roy Wilkins, and Adam Clayton Powell Jr., and was the first to recognize and publish Malcolm X. From 1916 to 1938, the paper operated from the New York Amsterdam News Building on Seventh Avenue in Harlem. The building is a National Landmark.

== History ==
The Amsterdam News was founded on December 4, 1909, by James Henry Anderson in the San Juan Hill neighborhood of Upper Manhattan. The newspaper takes its name from Amsterdam Avenue, the location of Anderson's home where he first published the newspaper.

An investment of US$10 in 1909 (equivalent to $358 in 2025) turned the Amsterdam News into one of New York's largest and most influential Black-owned-and-operated business institutions, and one of the nation's most prominent ethnic publications. It was later reported that James Henry Anderson published the first copy: "...with a dream in mind, $10 in his pocket, six sheets of paper and two pencils."

The Amsterdam News was one of about 50 black-owned newspapers in the United States at the time it was founded. It was sold for 2 cents a copy (equivalent to $1 in 2025) from Anderson's home at 132 West 65th Street, in the San Juan Hill section of Manhattan's Upper West Side. With the spread of Blacks to Harlem and the growing success of the paper, Anderson moved the Amsterdam News uptown to 17 West 135th Street in 1910. In 1916, it moved to 2293 Seventh Avenue, and in 1938, it moved again, to 2271 Seventh Avenue. In the early 1940s, the paper relocated to its present headquarters at 2340 Eighth Avenue (also known in Harlem as Frederick Douglass Boulevard).

Not soon after the death of Edward Warren, one of the early publishers, Anderson sold his stock in the paper. On October 9, 1935, the paper's editorial employees went on strike. It was the first time the staff of a black-owned newspaper had gone on strike and led to the Amsterdam News becoming the first unionized black paper. The strike ended on December 24, 1935, when the paper's bankruptcy receiver Laurence H. Axman, Newspaper Guild president Carl Randau, and businessmen Dr. C. B. Powell and Dr. Phillip M. H. Savory reached an agreement that saw the locked-out employees receive a 10% wage increase, a five-day, 40-hour work week, two weeks of annual vacation time, three-month dismissal notices for employees with more than 10 years of service, the establishment of a guild shop, and the removal of strike-breaking staff. The paper was taken over by Powell and Savory following bankruptcy proceedings by the paper's three largest creditors. Dr. Powell assumed the role of publisher. During Powell's stewardship, the Amsterdam News not only took on local news, but national news as well. Much of the paper's strength was based on its shaping the advancement and realization of Black aspirations. As a consequence, the paper is one of the most frequently quoted black newspapers in the world.

The Amsterdam News was the second black newspaper, after the Chicago Defender, to be admitted to the Audit Bureau of Circulation (ABC) in October 1930. In 1936, it became the first black newspaper that was unionized in all departments by the Newspaper Guild of New York. By 1961, the New York Amsterdam News had become the largest weekly community newspaper in the nation.

On May 1, 1971, Dr. C. B. Powell announced his retirement and sold the Amsterdam News to the AmNews Corporation, its present owner. Over the years, many important figures in journalism have been editors of the paper, including T. Thomas Fortune, George W. Harris, Obie McCollum, John Lewis Clarke, Earl Brown, Dan Burley, Julius J. Adams, Thomas Watkins, S. W. Garlington, Stanley Ross, T. J. Sellers, Dr. G. James Fleming, James L. Hicks, Jesse H. Walker, and Bryant Rollins.

While the Amsterdam News is black-oriented, it has always been aware of the fact that it serves a multiracial community and recognized other ethnic groups. On November 26, 1963, The New York Times credited the Amsterdam News with inspiring a crackdown on vices and other ills in the village of Harlem:

"The Amsterdam News has always had a great deal of persuasive power in Harlem and other black communities."

From 1972 to 1979, the newspaper began an art review column written by Gylbert Coker to cover African American art exhibitions and the African American artists.

In August 1982, Wilbert A. Tatum, chairman of the AmNews Corporation's board of directors and the paper's editor-in-chief, became publisher and chief executive officer. Under Tatum's leadership, the Amsterdam News broadened its editorial perspective, particularly in international affairs. This expanded thrust has produced considerable interest and readership from all sectors of the local, national and international communities.

In July 1996, Tatum bought out the last remaining investor, putting the future of the paper firmly in the hands of the Tatum family. In December 1997, Tatum stepped down as publisher and editor-in-chief and passed the torch to his daughter, Elinor Ruth Tatum, who at the age of 26 became one of the youngest newspaper publishers in the United States.

The newspaper launched a companion web site and online edition, amsterdamnews.com, in 2009.

== Circulation ==
In October 1930, it became the second Black newspaper to be admitted to the Audit Bureau of Circulation. At its height in the 1940s, newspaper had a circulation of 100,000 and was one of the four largest African-American newspapers in the United States. As of 2026, it circulates nearly 22,000 copies of the paper weekly.

== Format ==
In 1979, the newspaper changed from broadsheet to tabloid format.

== Operations ==
Its editor and publisher is Elinor Tatum, daughter of Wilbert "Bill" Tatum (1933—2009), who has served as the newspaper's editor, publisher, chairman and CEO.

== See also ==
- African American newspapers
- List of New York City newspapers and magazines
- Media in New York City
