= Wilbert Tatum =

American publisher (1933–2009)

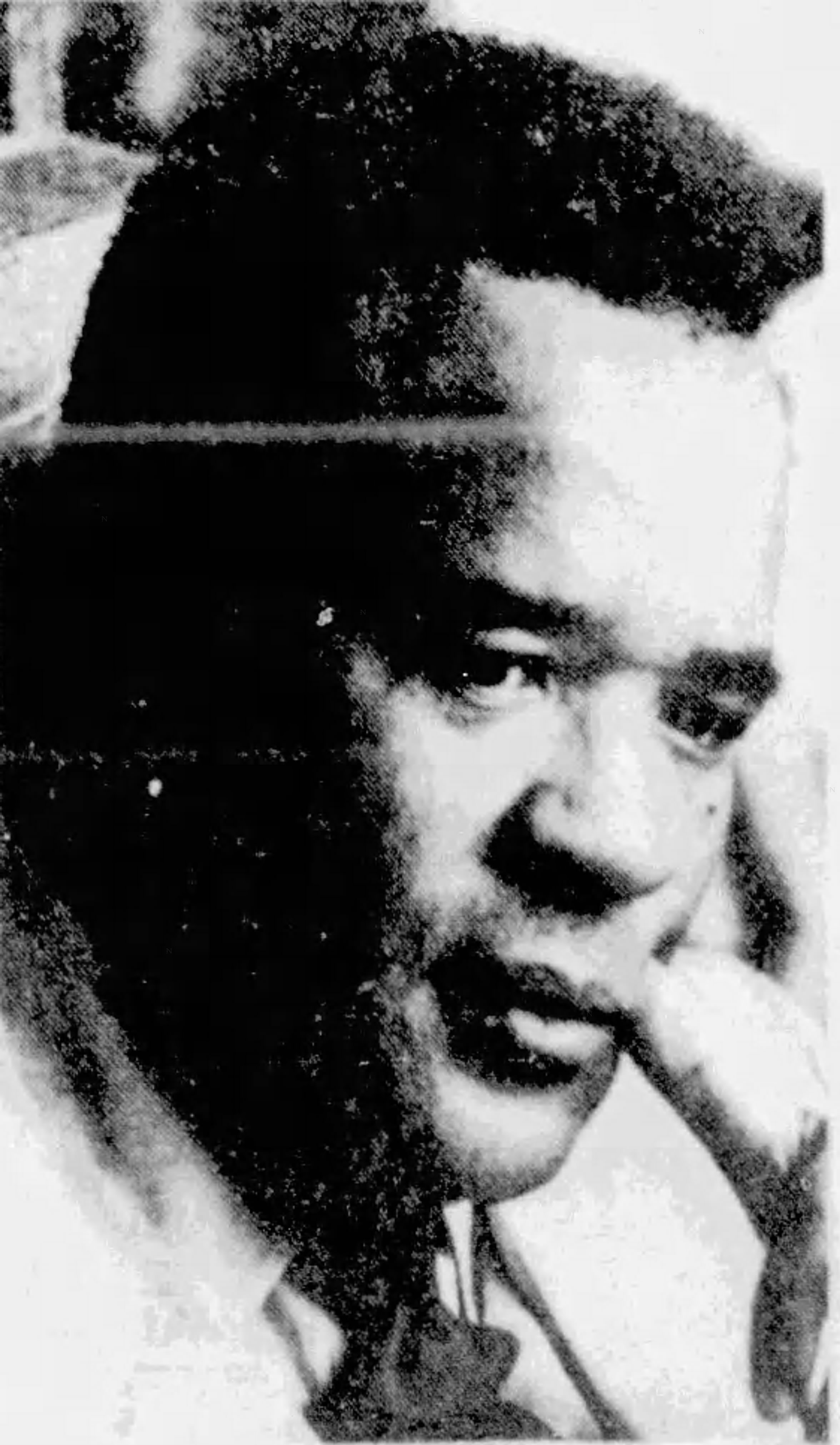
- Tatum c. 1977
- Born: January 23, 1933; Durham, North Carolina, U.S.
- Died: February 26, 2009 (aged 76)
- Education: Yale University; Lincoln University; Occidental College
- Occupation: Newspaper executive
- Children: Elinor Tatum (daughter)

Wilbert Arnold "Bill" Tatum (January 23, 1933 – February 26, 2009) was an American newspaper executive, who variously served as the editor, publisher, chairman and chief executive officer of the New York Amsterdam News, a weekly newspaper serving the African-American community of New York City.

== Early life and education ==
Tatum was born in a three-room shack in Durham, North Carolina, the 10th of 13 children, in 1933. He attended Durham's segregated schools, working during the summer in tobacco fields.

He majored in sociology at Lincoln University, the United States' first degree-granting historically black university. During the Korean War, he served in the United States Marine Corps as a drill instructor in Japan from 1951 until 1954. After completing his military service, he attended Yale University as a National Urban Fellow. Tatum was later awarded a master's degree from Occidental College, where he majored in urban studies.

== Career ==
Tatum spent 13 years working as a mayoral appointee in the government of New York City, during the John Lindsay and Abraham Beame administrations. While director of community relations at the New York City Department of Buildings, he spent a cold winter's night in 1967 in a Queens housing project that lacked heat, to publicize the circumstances of tenants there. He proposed a $6 billion "clothing stamp" program that would provide clothing for the poor nationwide while assisting the city's struggling garment industry. Another proposal would have replaced the site of the former Madison Square Garden with an indoor amusement park.

Through the mid-1980s, Tatum made money in real estate, purchasing and renovating abandoned or neglected buildings that were reconstructed and repaired using unskilled ex-offenders and political refugee laborers.

=== Amsterdam News ===
Tatum was part of a group that purchased the New York Amsterdam News newspaper in 1971, which included investors such as former New York State Comptroller H. Carl McCall and Manhattan Borough President Percy E. Sutton. By the mid-1980s, Tatum had invested more than $400 thousand in the publication, most of it from bank loans using his real estate holdings as collateral. He acquired control of the paper in 1983 and became the paper's sole owner in 1996 after acquiring the stake of the last independent shareholder.

During his 25 years with the Amsterdam News, Tatum's name was "nearly synonymous with the paper's", as described in a notice by The New York Times announcing his death. Although circulation dropped from 58,907 in 1977 to 25,962 in 2000, the paper remained influential.

During the 1984 presidential election, Tatum declined to endorse the candidacy of Jesse Jackson or any of the other Democratic Party candidates. During Tatum's tenure, the paper published a defense of Tawana Brawley after official findings found her 1987 sexual assault claims to be false. In 1989, he decided to disclose the identity of the sexual assault victim in the widely publicized Central Park 5 case.

In 1984, Tatum established an informal group of Jewish and African-American leaders that met to address issues regarding relations between the two communities. That same year, he was recognized by the Federation of Jewish Philanthropies for his efforts on behalf of runaway children on the Lower East Side of Manhattan.

While Ed Koch was Mayor of New York City, Tatum wrote a weekly editorial series, "Why Koch Should Resign", that ran on the front page from February 1986 to September 1989, accusing Koch of leading an ineffective and corrupt municipal government that did not address the concerns of minority residents of the city. After Koch lost the mayoral primary in 1989 to David Dinkins, Tatum's last editorial read: "On September 12 at 11:50 p.m., Edward I. Koch conceded defeat in the primary. December 31 will be his last day of work. End of series."

Tatum was credited by members of the city's Jewish community with improving the paper's balance in coverage of Jewish subjects. The associate executive director of the American Jewish Congress recognized in 1984 that "Tatum has been very sympathetic and understanding of problems confronting both Jews and blacks". Mayor Koch had earlier called the paper "an anti-Semitic rag" that had become "less rabid in its coverage than it was before", but held a July 1984 debate with Tatum on Jewish-black relations after Tatum published an editorial critical of the Mayor.

While most of the initial investors had left over time, John L. Edmonds had stayed on over the years, feuding with Tatum over the management of the paper and Tatum's use of funds. A suit filed by Edmonds ended in 1996 with a jury finding that Tatum owed Edmonds just over $1 million that it determined had been diverted from the paper's parent company, with Edmonds' attorney describing that Tatum had "used The Amsterdam News since 1982 as his own personal piggy bank".

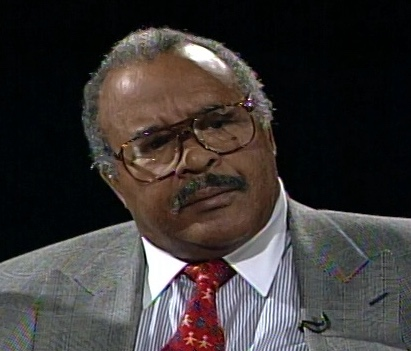
Tatum on CUNY TV's Urban Agenda (1996)

Tatum stepped down in 1997 and named his daughter Elinor Tatum, then 26 years old and a graduate of New York University's postgraduate journalism program, to serve as publisher and editor-in-chief of the paper. Tatum retained his position as chairman of the board after his daughter took over day-to-day operation of the paper, and he retained the position until his death.

Tatum wrote that Al Gore had chosen Joseph Lieberman as his running mate in the 2000 United States presidential election because Lieberman would be able to raise funds from fellow Jews, stating that "Gore and his minions did it for the money".

== Personal life ==
Tatum married Susan Kohn, a Jewish refugee from Czechoslovakia, with whom he had a daughter. Tatum lived in the Manhattan's East Village in a 23-room triplex that he had bought in 1967 for $4,000 and had improved.

== Death ==
Tatum died on February 26, 2009 from multiple organ failure in Dubrovnik, Croatia, where he was traveling with his wife. A diabetic, Tatum was a wheelchair user at the time of his death.

Following his death, President Barack Obama sent a letter of condolence, while Secretary of State Hillary Clinton issued a statement describing Tatum as a friend, inspiration and leader among journalists. New York City Mayor Michael Bloomberg, Governor David Paterson, former Mayor David Dinkins, and U.S. Representative Charles Rangel attended his funeral, where civil rights activist Al Sharpton delivered the eulogy.
