= Frank D. Fackenthal =

American educator

President of Columbia University
- Acting
- In office 1945–1948
- Preceded by: Nicholas Murray Butler
- Succeeded by: Dwight D. Eisenhower

Personal details
- Born: Frank Diehl Fackenthal; February 22, 1883 Hellertown, Pennsylvania
- Died: September 5, 1968 (aged 85) East Stroudsburg, Pennsylvania
- Education: Boys High School
- Alma mater: Columbia College

Frank Diehl Fackenthal (February 22, 1883 – September 5, 1968) was an American academic administrator best known for his long association with Columbia University. Of Pennsylvania Dutch descent, he resided for much of his life in the Crown Heights and Park Slope sections of Brooklyn, New York.

== Biography ==
The son of the general manager of Brooklyn's Peter Cooper Glue Factory, Fackenthal graduated from the borough's Boys High School in 1902 before earning his undergraduate degree (as a self-described "able C man") from Columbia College in 1906. As a student, his prodigious administrative abilities (reflected by his leadership in various campus organizations, including the Varsity Show and the Columbia Daily Spectator) were recognized by president Nicholas Murray Butler, leading to his appointment as chief clerk (1906–1910), secretary (1910–1937), and provost (1937–1948) of the university. As secretary and provost, he was the de facto administrator of the Pulitzer Prizes' non-journalistic awards from their inception until 1948; following his retirement, he received a special Prize in recognition of his service.

Previously, Fackenthal received an honorary LL.D. from Franklin & Marshall College (a recipient of familial philanthropy) and an honorary Litt.D. from Columbia in 1929. Although he never completed an earned graduate degree, he was frequently characterized in the press thereafter as "Dr. Fackenthal." He subsequently received honorary doctorates from Syracuse University, Rutgers University, New York University and Union College.

Between the retirement of Nicholas Murray Butler in 1945 and the installation of Dwight D. Eisenhower as president in 1948, Fackenthal served as acting president while retaining his post as provost. Although several trustees considered motioning for his permanent appointment (in part due to his longstanding popularity among the undergraduate student body), this was forestalled by the ailing Butler, who considered Fackenthal to be unworthy of the position. Despite this acrimony, Fackenthal was elected to the university's board of trustees against Butler's wishes in 1946 in an unprecedented breach of longstanding tradition that acting presidents could not serve on the board. According to Pulitzer Prizes staff member Sean Murphy, Fackenthal developed a plan for Columbia's continued growth during this period that was "largely eschewed by his successors." He also oversaw the formation of the School of General Studies (for nontraditional undergraduates and nonmatriculated students), the graduate-level School of International Affairs and the Harriman Institute.

Following his retirement from the university in 1948, he served as educational consultant to the Carnegie Corporation (1948–1952) and then as president of Columbia University Press (1953–1958). He also served as president of the Bushwick Savings Bank and remained a trustee of various institutions, including Columbia, Barnard College, Franklin and Marshall College and the Riverdale Country School. His speeches as acting president were published by Columbia University Press as The Greater Power and Other Addresses (1949).

In December 1965, he was critically injured when his car collided with a truck in White Township, New Jersey, 35 miles south of his country home in Buck Hill Falls, Pennsylvania. As a result of his injuries, Fackenthal (who never married and had no legitimate children) was forced to permanently relocate from Brooklyn to Buck Hill Falls. He relinquished his trusteeship of Columbia in 1967 and died at Monroe County General Hospital in East Stroudsburg, Pennsylvania, on September 5, 1968.

== Notes ==
Academic offices
Preceded by Nicholas Murray Butler as President	President of Columbia University; Acting; 1945–1948	Succeeded by Dwight D. Eisenhower as President
