= Elinor Tatum =

New York City newspaper publisher

- Born: Elinor Ruth Tatum; January 29, 1971; New York City, US
- Education: Dwight School; New York University
- Title: Publisher
- Father: Wilbert Tatum

Elinor Ruth Tatum (born January 29, 1971) is the publisher and editor in chief of the New York Amsterdam News, the oldest and largest black newspaper in the City of New York, and one of the oldest ethnic papers in the country. Under her leadership, the newspaper underwent significant modernization, including the transition from typewriters to computers, the introduction of a new layout, and the creation of an online edition.

== Education ==
Tatum attended Hunter College Elementary School and the Dwight School. She studied Government at St. Lawrence University in Canton, New York, graduating in 1993. She proceeded to Stockholm University in Sweden, where she studied International relations and the Swedish model of government. She subsequently earned a master's degree from New York University.

== Career ==
In 1994, Tatum returned to New York to join her father at the New York Amsterdam News. She accepted a position as assistant to the publisher, her work included reporting for the paper. While reporting, she filed stories on topics ranging from the Million Man March, to Boxing, to a student strike at the City University of New York. In 1996, Tatum was promoted to Associate Publisher and Chief Operating Officer of the newspaper. That fall, she entered New York University working toward her master's degree in journalism and mass communication, while continuing to work full-time at the Amsterdam News. In December 1997, she completed the course work for her master's degree and was promoted to publisher and editor-in-chief.

Tatum became one of the youngest publishers in the history of the Afro-American press. Under her watch, the newspaper refocused its content on current issues affecting Harlem and the wider African-American community in New York and across the United States. The Amsterdam News also established an online presence and became part of the Black Press USA Network.

Elinor Tatum produced and co-hosted a weekly segment of Al Sharpton’s radio show Keepin' It Real — inviting members of the Black Press to discuss national issues facing the African-American community. She has guest hosted the WWRL Radio morning and afternoon drive programs. Tatum has appeared on The O'Reilly Factor, 20/20, New York 1, CUNY TV, The Today Show, and NBC Nightly News.

In addition to her career in journalism, Tatum has been involved in civic and community organizations in New York. She has served on the Board of Trustees of her alma mater, St. Lawrence University, as well as the boards of the New York Urban League, the Neighborhood Defender Service of Harlem, and the Creative Vision Foundation. She has also served on the board of Manhattan Community Board 3.

== Honors ==
Tatum has received numerous honors for her contributions to journalism, publishing, and civic life. She has been recognized in Who’s Who of American Women and received a Doctor of Humane Letters honoris causa from Metropolitan College, as well as the Manhattan Borough President’s Women’s History Month Award, the Public Advocate of New York City Award of Distinction, and the National Action Network’s Standing on Their Shoulders Award. She has also received the Good Scout Award and the Pi Beta Phi Members of Distinction Award.

In 2024, Tatum was named Editor & Publisher's Publisher of the Year, becoming the first Black woman to receive the honor in the award's history.

== Personal life ==
Tatum is the only daughter of publisher Wilbert Tatum and Susan Kohn Tatum. Her mother was Jewish and was born in Czechoslovakia to a family that fled Europe in 1939 during The Holocaust and settled in Ecuador. Her mother's sister survived Auschwitz, while another aunt, who worked as a nurse in the Terezin concentration camp, also survived.

Tatum was born and raised in New York City and has visited Israel since childhood. She has described herself as both Black and Jewish. Tatum has also spoken publicly about her family's Interracial and Interfaith background and has been active in efforts to promote understanding between Black and Jewish communities.

Tatum was previously married to Curtis R. Simmons, with whom she has a daughter.
