= Zabelle Panosian =

Armenian-American soprano

Zabelle Panosian (June 7, 1891 – January 26, 1986) was an Armenian-American soprano.

She was born Takouhi Der Mesrobian in an Armenian-speaking town, Bardizag (now Bahçecik, Turkey). She emigrated to the United States in the spring of 1907 and was married to the photo-engraver Aram Sarkis Panosian, in Brookline, Massachusetts, with whom she had a daughter in 1908, the dancer Adrina Otero (later Adriana Joyce).

In March 1917 and June 1918, she recorded ten songs in Armenian and one song in French for Columbia Records' Woolworth Building studio in New York. She is best known for her rendition of Groung (Crane), a folk song that was at least three hundred years old at the time that she recorded it and sold well to Armenians through the 1920s until 1931 when Columbia deleted its Armenian-language catalog.

A contemporary of Armenian-American singers Torcom Bezazian and Amenag Chah-Mouradian, with the latter of whom she frequently performed, Panosian was a prolific fundraiser for Armenian causes from 1915 through 1919. She travelled to Europe and Egypt from 1920 to 1923. While living in Paris, she met Komitas and published an account of their meeting.

From 1923 onward, she lived in New York City. She continued to perform regularly through the 1930s including a concert tour of California, and less often through the 1940s and 50s including appearances in Brazil and Uruguay with her daughter as well as Armenian literary events in New York. In 1982, she donated $756,939 to the Armenian General Benevolent Union.
