= Jock Richardson =

Scottish footballer

Personal information
- Full name: John Richardson
- Date of birth: 11 November 1906
- Place of birth: Motherwell, Scotland
- Date of death: 2 January 1986 (aged 79)
- Place of death: Law, Scotland
- Position: Full back

Senior career*
Years	Team	Apps	(Gls)
- Burnbank Athletic
1923–1924	Hamilton Academical	1	(0)
1924–1927	Northfleet United	?	(?)
1927–1929	Tottenham Hotspur	38	(0)
1929–1933	Reading	125	(0)
1934	Bournemouth & Boscombe Athletic	7	(0)
	Folkestone	?	(?)
- * Club domestic league appearances and goals

John Richardson (11 November 1906 – 2 January 1986) was a Scottish professional footballer who played for Hamilton Academical, Northfleet United, Tottenham Hotspur, Reading, Bournemouth & Boscombe Athletic and Folkestone.

== Football career ==
Richardson began his senior career as a teenager at Hamilton Academical. He joined Northfleet United (the "nursery" club of Tottenham Hotspur) in 1924 before signing officially for Tottenham in 1927. The full back made a total of 41 appearances in all competitions for the Spurs between 1927 and 1929. Richardson joined Reading in 1929 where he featured in 133 matches in total. He later played for Bournemouth & Boscombe Athletic and finally ending his career at Folkestone. He later worked as a scout for Tottenham based in Scotland.
