= Juan Manuel Rozas =

Spanish writer

Juan Manuel Rozas (1936 – January 14, 1986) was a Spanish writer. After her died the Juan Manuel Rozas Prize was set up in his memory and it was won by the Spanish poet Ada Salas in 1988.

== Works ==
- The Count of Villamediana. Bibliography and contribution to the study of texts. Madrid, CSIC, 1964 (bibliographic Papers, 11)
- Songs of Mendes Brito. Unpublished works of Count Villamediana. Madrid, CSIC, 1965
- Academy held in the city of Ciudad Real in 1678. Ciudad Real, Manchegos Studies Institute, 1965
- The language and literature at the CSIC. Madrid, CSIC (in collaboration with A. Quilis)
- Bartholomew Jimenez Paton. Spelling Epitome of Latin and Castilian. Institutions of Spanish grammar. Study and editing. Madrid, CSIC, 1965, "Hispanic Classics" (in collaboration with A. Quilis)
- Breton de los Herreros. Work dispersed. Logroño. Riojanos Studies Institute, 1965 (in collaboration with JM Díez Taboada)
- The poetic generation of 1927. Study, anthology and documentation. Madrid, Alcala, 1966 (in collaboration with Joaquin Gonzalez Muela)
- The poetic generation of 1927. Second ed., Greatly enlarged and modified. Madrid, Alcala, 1974 «limina" 3. ª ed. greatly enlarged, Madrid, Isthmus, 1986
- Villamediana: CC sonnets. Introduction and texts. Barcelona, Mars, 1967
- Villamediana: Works (1629). Study and editing. Madrid, Castalia, 1969, 2. ª ed., Madrid, Castalia, 1980
- Azorin. Castilla. Edition, preface and notes. Barcelona, Labor, 1973. "Modern Hispanic Texts', 21
- The generation of 27 from within. Madrid, Alcala, 1974 «limina", 3). 2. ª ed. greatly enlarged, Madrid, Isthmus, 1986, "Bella Bellatrix»
- Meaning and doctrine of "New Art" of Lope. Madrid, SGEL, 1976 (collection "Themes")
- Life and work of Villamediana. (Forthcoming in Ed Ariel)
- About Marino and Spain. Madrid, National Editor, 1978
- The Golden Age Theater in times of Lope de Vega. Madrid, UNED, 1976
- History of Literature, I. Madrid, UNED, 1976, 2 vols. (Directed and written eight chapters)
- The 27 and generation. Santander, The Mouse Island, 1978
- History of Literature, II. Madrid, UNED, 1978, 2 vols. (Directed and written five chapters)
- Poetry (1930-1931). Facsimile Edition and Introduction, 2 vols., Vaduz, Topos Verlag, 1979
- Intra and literature. Salamanca, University International Courses, 1980
- The poetic group of 27. Madrid, Chisel, 1980, 2 vols. (In collaboration with G. Torres Nebrera)
- Lope de Vega and Felipe IV in senectute cycle. Opening address by 1982-83. Cáceres, Extremadura University, 1982
- Three Secrets (loudly) from the literature 27. Cáceres, Publications of the Department of Literature, 1983
- Periods of Spanish literary literature (exemplified with bibliographers Extremadura). Cáceres, Publications of the Department of Literature, 1983
- Gonzalo de Berceo, Miracles of Our Lady. Juan Manuel Rozas Ed. Barcelona, Plaza y Janes, "Classic", 1986. Reprinted in Madrid, Libertarian
- Studies on Lope de Vega. Edited by Jesus Cañas Murillo. Madrid, Chair, 1990
- Human and divine rhymes of Mr. Tome of Burguillos. Juan Manuel Rozas Editing and Jesus Cañas Murillo. Madrid, Castalia, "Castalia Classics", in press
- Consolation and their gods. The Mouse Island, Santander, 1984
- Anonymous Guadalupe Villarreal and Yuste, double Songbook. Juan Manuel Rozas Ed. Cáceres, 1985 (Palinodia, n. # 1, annexed to gauge)
- Ostinato. Badajoz, Provincial Government, 1986 (posthumous)
- Speech manual. Cáceres, Editions Norba 10004, col. 'Tiles' 3
