= Annie Hooper =

American sculptor

Annie Hooper (26 February 1897 – 11 January 1986) was a sculptor of visionary religious art from Buxton, North Carolina. Her work is an example of folk art, outsider art, and visionary art.

== Early life ==
Annie Miller was born in Buxton, on Cape Hatteras, and was raised in a Methodist family of 13 children and 14 foster children. Annie briefly attended college in Blackstone, Virginia, before marrying John Hooper and moving to Stumpy Point. John worked as a fisherman, while Annie taught Sunday school, played organ, and wrote poetry. The couple had one child, Edgar. John and Edgar served in World War II, and during their absence Annie suffered the first in a series of depressions. After the war, the Hoopers moved to Buxton and opened a motel.

== Sculptures ==
Annie Hooper began sculpting upon returning from a prolonged mental health treatment in Raleigh. Her first sculpture, Moses on Mount Nebo looking over the River Jordan into the Promised Land of Canaan, was created from driftwood, putty, and house paint. Later figures (which she referred to as “symbols”) incorporated cement and shells, and were accompanied by descriptive placards. During the forty years she was active as an artist, Hooper created nearly 5,000 sculptures, which she arranged throughout her home in tableaus representing an estimated 300 Biblical scenes. Hooper did not sell any of her work, preferring to lead visitors on tours in which she used the figures to act out religious stories.

== Legacy ==
Following Hooper’s death, preservation of her work was overseen by folklorist Roger Manley, with financial assistance from The Jargon Society. It is now housed in the permanent collection of North Carolina State University’s Gregg Museum of Art and Design. A solo exhibition of Hooper’s work, titled A Blessing from the Source, was held in 1988.

== See also ==
- Howard Finster
- Minnie Evans
- Grandma Prisbrey's Bottle Village
