= James L. Hicks =

American journalist (1915-1986)

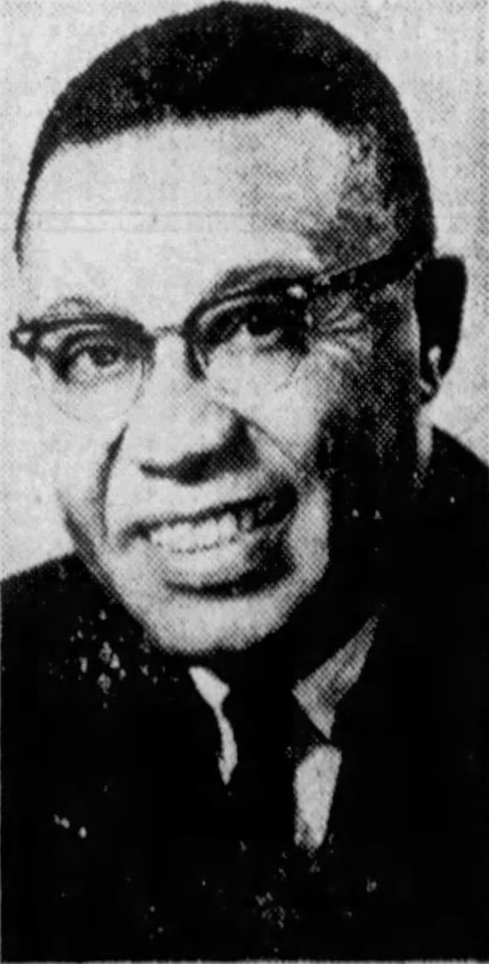
Hicks c. 1970

James L. Hicks (May 9, 1915 – January 16, 1986) was an American journalist active from 1935 to 1977. He wrote a column for the Baltimore Afro-American advocating opportunities in the U.S. Army. Hicks covered school integration in Little Rock, Arkansas and Oxford, Mississippi, and his coverage of the Emmett Till murder trial in Sumner, Mississippi.

== Biography ==
=== Early years ===
Hicks was born to African-American parents in Akron, Ohio, on May 9, 1915. He was educated at the University of Akron, Ohio, and Howard University.

=== Military service ===
Hicks enlisted as a private in the U.S. Army, and during his service in New Guinea he was awarded three battle stars and promoted to captain. In an interview for the documentary, Eyes on the Prize, Hicks claimed that his time spent in the military, among many other black veterans', heavily influenced his activist role when he returned to the United States. Hicks said of the beginning of his involvement in the Civil Rights Movement, "I spent three years overseas in New Guinea and I became an officer during that period. I had been eager to exercise authority, so when we got out it was just one more step towards saying, 'look, we aren't going to take this anymore'."

=== Career ===
Hicks began his career in journalism as a reporter for the Cleveland Call and Post in 1935. After his stint in the war, he joined the Baltimore Afro-American, and in his time there became the Washington Bureau Chief for the National Negro Press Association. He served as the executive editor for the New York Amsterdam News during 1955–1966, and again 1972–1977. In 1977, he became editor for the New York Voice.

Hicks also held positions in public relations for the National Urban League and as the assistant commissioner of the New York State Division of Human Rights. Hicks was the first black member of the State Department Correspondents Association and the first black journalist cleared to cover the United Nations; for this he is labeled by some as a "pioneer in the field".

==== Emmett Till murder trial ====
External videos
- "Interview with James L. Hicks” conducted for Eyes on the Prize includes discussion on Hicks's coverage of the Emmett Till trial.

Hicks' coverage of the Emmett Till murder trial was published as a series of installments in dozens of newspapers including the Baltimore Afro-American, the Cleveland Call and Post, and the Atlanta Daily World. His investigative journalism uncovered the identities of two key witnesses to the murder, who Hicks believed, would have led to the prosecution of the accused, Roy Bryant and J.W. Milam. The witnesses, Leroy "Too-Tight" Collins, and Henry Lee Loggins, had been seen riding in the back of J.W. Milam's truck with Emmett Till the night he was murdered. Hicks and his colleague, L. Alex Wilson, continued to track down these witnesses well after the trial had ended and this investigative work was featured in the documentary, "The Untold Story of Emmett Louis Till" produced by Keith Beauchamp. Articles by Hicks written for the Cleveland Call and Post are found in Christopher Metress's The Lynching of Emmett Till: A Documentary Narrative (University of Virginia Press, Sept 2002).

These were published in the 2000 Spring issue of Archipelago Vol. 6, No. 1. On January 20, 2003 the documentary “The Murder of Emmett Till” was broadcast by “American Experience” and PBS.

The book Why It’s Unlikely the Emmett Till Murder Mystery Will Ever Be Solved by authors David T. Beito and Linda Royster Beito include references to Hicks' role in events surrounding the trial of Bryant and Milam.

==== The Little Rock Nine ====
In 1957, Hicks, alongside several other representatives of the black press, Earl Davy, Moses Newson, and L. Alex Wilson, attended the integration of nine black students into Little Rock Central High School. When the black reporters arrived on the scene they were beaten and chased by a mob, which was protesting the integration outside the school. After the students gained entry to the school, the mob accused the black reporters of being a decoy for the students. In a story he wrote for Amsterdam News on September 28, 1957, Hicks states, "After we were safely out of the mob area, reports came over the radio that we had been sent to the school as 'decoys' to the mob so that they would not notice the Negro children when they slipped in. This is actually what happened but it certainly was not in our plan."

==== James Meredith and Ole Miss ====
In Hicks' story, "On the Mississippi Warfront: Oxford's a Town all Shook Up", printed by Amsterdam News in 1962, Hicks described the events leading up to James Meredith's reported visit to the Ole Miss campus as "chaos and bedlam". Despite the possession of valid press credentials, the black press members, including Hicks, were denied access to the campus and were only able to cover the story from outside the school gates. Because of his inability to access the campus, Hicks followed the mob to stay close to the story of James Meredith's arrival. In order to keep James Meredith, a black student attempting to integrate Ole Miss, out of Oxford, the town "massed every law officer the state of Mississippi could produce", and hoped this would convince Meredith not to return. Hicks described the town as a "mess".

== Death ==
Hicks died in Manhattan, New York, on January 16, 1986 at the age of 70.

== Personal life ==
He was married to the former Daisy Turner, and they had two children.

== External References ==
Cleveland Call & Post Oct 1955 James L. Hicks' Trial dispatches (Archipelago)

- “They Stand Accused by C-P Reporter: Jimmy Hicks Charges Miss. Officials Aided Lynchers,” October 8
- “White Reporters Doublecrossed Probers Seeking Lost Witnesses,” October 15
- “The Mississippi Lynching Story: Luring Terrorized Witnesses from the Plantations Was Toughest Job,” October 22
- “Jimmy Hicks Tells Inside Story of Infamous Mississippi Lynch Case,” October 22
