= Zonja Wallen-Lawrence =

American researcher

- Born: September 17, 1892; Stockholm, Sweden
- Died: January 28, 1986 (aged 93); Washington, D.C.
- Occupations: Biochemist, college professor, nutritionist
- Spouse: John V. Lawrence

Zonja Elizabeth Wallen-Lawrence (September 17, 1892 – January 28, 1986) was a Swedish-born American biochemist, college professor, and nutritionist. She worked for the United States Department of Agriculture in the 1920s, and was a chemistry professor at Vassar College and Mount Holyoke College.

== Early life and education ==
Wallén was born in Stockholm, the daughter of Carl Wilhelm Wallén and Eva Charlotta Andersdotter Wallén. She moved to the United States in 1903, with her family. She graduated from the University of Chicago in 1915, and earned a Ph.D. in biochemistry there in 1936. For the 1927–1928 academic year, she held a fellowship from the Evaporated Milk Association to do research at the University of Chicago.

== Career ==
Wallen taught chemistry at the University of Chicago from 1916 to 1918. From 1917 to 1920 and from 1922 to 1923, she taught chemistry at Vassar College. She taught at Mount Holyoke College from 1918 to 1920.

Walle-Lawrence and her husband lived on the Gila River Indian Reservation from 1920 to 1921, as employees of the Bureau of Plant Industry, United States Department of Agriculture. They collected handmade baskets and other artifacts during their time at Gila River, some of which are now in the collection of the National Museum of the American Indian.

During World War II, Wallen-Lawrence taught public nutrition classes for the American Red Cross at Washington University School of Medicine. After the war, she was a member of the executive committee of the St. Louis Consumer Federation, and the Fight Inflation Committee of Greater St. Louis, and active in the American Association of University Women (AAUW). She consulted on campaigns for dairy inspection and bread enrichment. "We have such a tremendous fund of knowledge, which doesn't which doesn't do much good until it is in the hands of the layman, or more specifically the housewife, and is understood by everyone," she explained in 1950, about her nutrition education work.

== Publications ==
In the 1920s and 1930s, while Wallen-Lawrence was an academic biochemist, she published her research in professional journals including Journal of Agricultural Research, Journal of Biological Chemistry, Archives of Pediatrics & Adolescent Medicine, Journal of Pharmacology and Experimental Therapeutics, and Experimental Biology and Medicine.

- "The tissue fluids of Egyptian and Upland cottons and their F, hybrid" (1924, with W. F. Hoffman and J. V. Lawrence)
- "Determination of Lactic Acid in Blood" (1927, with Ethel Ronzoni)
- "The Relative Digestibility of Unsweetened Evaporated Milk, Boiled Milk and Raw Milk by Trypsin in Vitro" (1930, with F. C. Koch)
- "On the Growth Promoting-Hormone of the Pituitary Body" (1930, with H. B. Van Dyke)
- "Difference Between Gonad-Stimulation by Extracts of Pregnancy-Urine and of Pituitary Body" (1931, with H. B. Van Dyke)
- "Further Observations on the Gonad-Stimulating Principle of the Anterior Lobe of the Pituitary Body" (1933, with H. B. Van Dyke)
- "Proof of the Existence of a Follicle-Stimulating and a Luteinizing Hormone in the Anterior Lobe of the Pituitary Body" (1934)

== Personal life ==
Wallen married physician and medical researcher John Vincent Lawrence in 1920. Her husband died in 1960, and she died in 1986, at the age of 93, in Washington, D.C.
