= Herbert Prince =

English footballer

Personal information
- Date of birth: 14 January 1892
- Place of birth: South Stoneham, England
- Date of death: 12 January 1986 (aged 93)
- Place of death: Andover, England

International career
Years	Team	Apps	(Gls)
1920	Great Britain	1	(0)

Herbert Prince (14 January 1892 – 12 January 1986) was an English footballer. He competed in the men's tournament at the 1920 Summer Olympics.
