= Theodor Hoelty-Nickel =

German-American church musician (1894–1986)

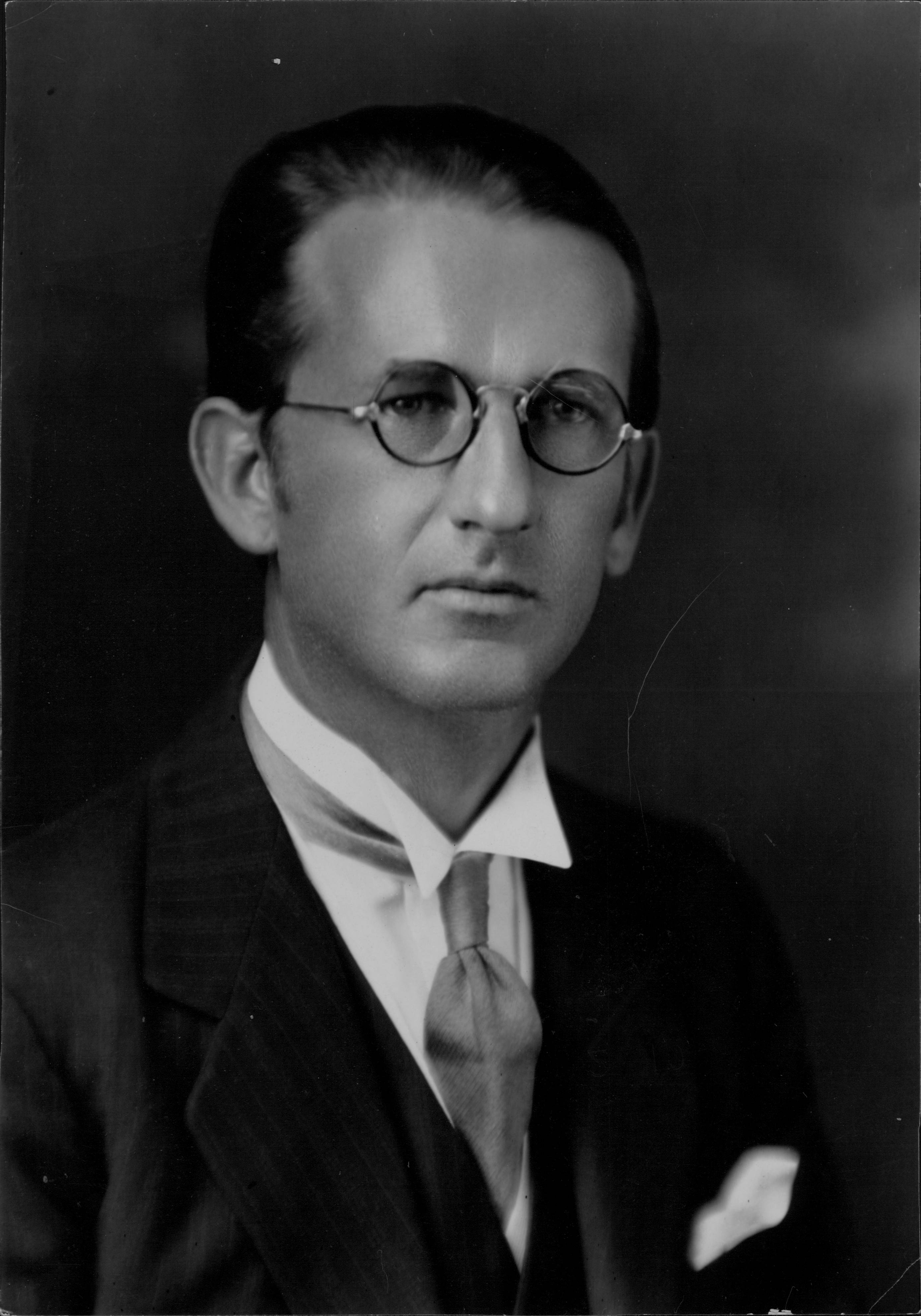
Theodor Hoelty-Nickel

Theodor Hoelty-Nickel (also Theo Nickel and Theodore Hoelty-Nickel, (31 August 1894 – 20 January 1986) was a German-American church musician and musicologist.

== Life ==
Hoelty-Nickel was born in Güstrow, Germany and grew up in Adelaide, Australia. He studied theology and then music at the Trinity Laban Conservatoire of Music and Dance London and at the Kirchenmusikschule Leipzig. From 1928 to 1942, he held the post of director of music at the Luther College in Decorah (Iowa). In 1941, he became music director of the Concordia Radio Station in St. Louis (Missouri/USA), then from 1943, head of the music department at Valparaiso University in Indiana. Hoelty-Nickel was the editor of a collection of Lutheran church music The Musical Heritage of the Church (5 volumes, 1950) (1945–1955) and The Little Bach Book.

Hoelty-Nickel died in Indiana at the age of 91.
