= Elena de Galantha =

American histologist

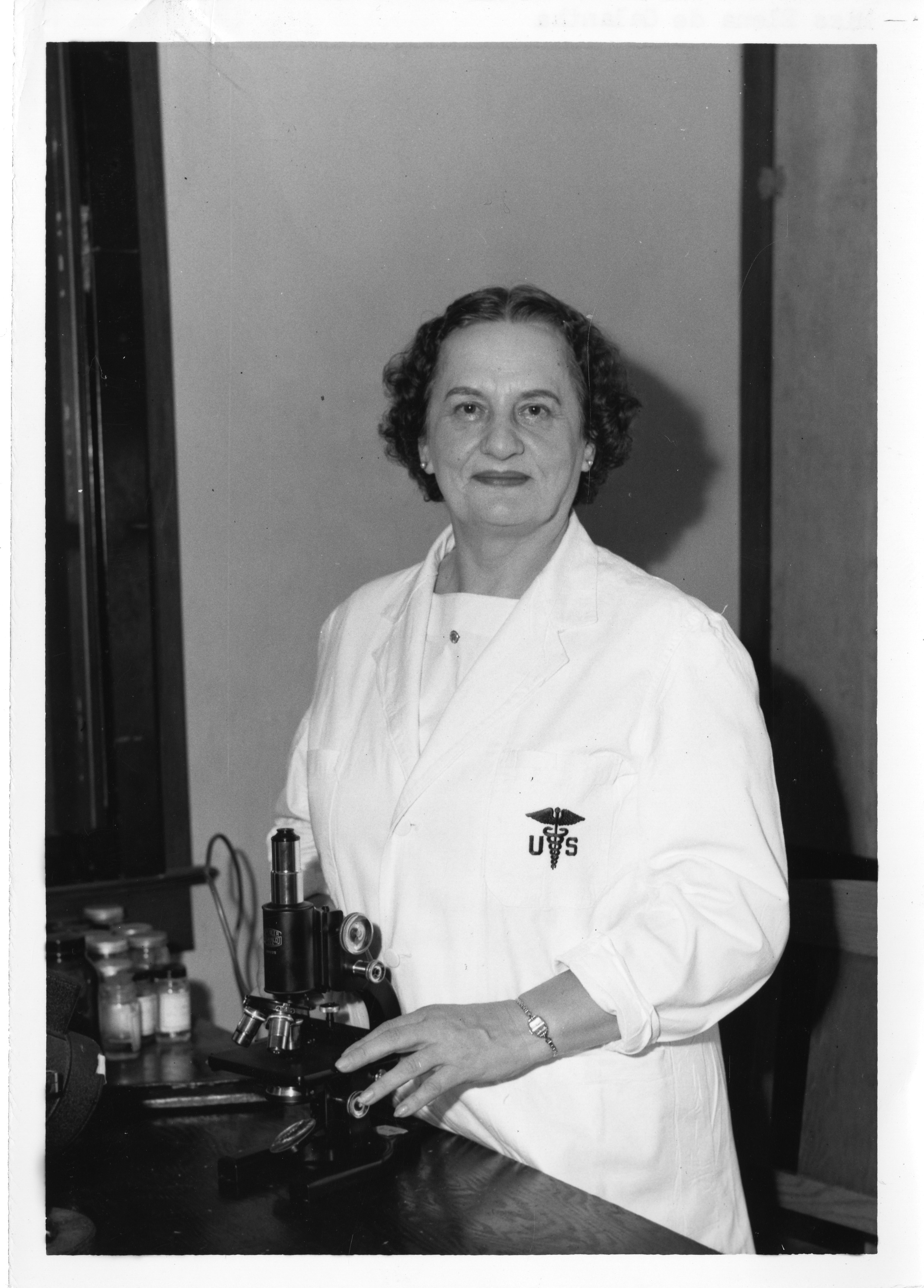
Elena de Galantha

Elena de Galantha (24 November 1890 – 5 January 1986) was an Austro-Hungarian histologist. She is considered a pioneer in the field of modern histology and known for the de Galantha technique and the de Galantha stain.

== Life and times ==
Madame Elena Fekete de Galantha was born on 24 November 1890 in Pozsony County, Hungary an heir to the Magyar nobility, daughter of Count Johan Alexander Fekete and Amelia (von Krompholtz) de Galantha. Her family was killed in World War I when the Russian army overtook Hungary. Her great-grandfather was regent to Queen Maria Theresa of Austria, and her great-uncle proclaimed the youthful Francis Joseph Emperor of Austria and King of Hungary in 1848. de Galantha died at Worcester Memorial Hospital on 5 January 1986 and is buried at Evergreen Cemetery in Leominster, Worcester County, Massachusetts.

== From Hungary to New York ==
From an early age de Galantha dreamed of the pursuit of being a physician and to follow in the footsteps of her great-uncle, Professor Hermann Nothnagel, a well-known surgeon of Vienna. As the daughter and granddaughter of army generals there seemed to be no obstacles in her way. She attended the University of Vienna in Austria, pursuing studies in medicine. Then World War I (1914-1918) broke out and her life changed dramatically. The plans for additional college education and a medical career ended. de Galantha's father returned to serve in the army and was killed when the Russian Army invaded Hungary. Her mother turned to nursing the sick and wounded and died during the War. She lost her parents, her home and everything that mattered. de Galantha sought refuge in Fiume and eventually fled to New York City in 1922.

== New York ==
In New York, de Galantha made contact with someone she had met in Vienna and who happened to be a staff physician at Bellevue Hospital in New York City. She landed a job as hospital ambulance driver.

== Mayo Clinic ==
In February 1938, de Galantha resided at 225 4th Avenue South West in Rochester, Minnesota. She had moved to Minnesota and achieved the position as head of the Histology Laboratory at the Mayo Clinic in the pathology laboratory where she remained for 13 years. At Mayo, she mentored and trained young women to become laboratory assistants at Mayo and trained women at hospitals and clinics around the country. In addition, her travels to hospitals and laboratories across the country allowed her access to new techniques, methods and ideas in microscopy and histology.

== de Galantha technique and de Galantha stain ==
At Mayo, de Galantha developed several novel methods and techniques in the field of histology. The de Galantha technique and the de Galantha stain bear her name for this work. The methods, techniques and stain she developed are well-known and utilized in histology and other fields of pathology to this day.

== Houston ==
In September 1943, de Galantha moved to Houston, Texas and secured a medical technologist position performing histopathological research at Baylor Medical College in the laboratory of Dr. Anthony A. Pearson, professor of anatomy. She handled microscopic samples for the departments of anatomy and histology.

== Private life ==
De Galantha, in her private life, was known as Mrs. Eugene E. Howard. She became a U.S. citizen in 1930. While in New York City, she studied fine arts at Columbia University and had an interior decorating business. In 1929 Elena de Galantha had an apartment in Manhattan in New York City and managed an upscale costume and clothier business whose clients were the social elite. Her talent and skill permitted her to design costumes, contribute to the decoration of the shop and duties included customer service, all with low pay. One day when the shop owner asked her to scrub the shop floors, she refused and quit. This left her without a job. She related this story to the reporter: "without a trace of bitterness in her softly modulated voice."

== Select publications ==
- de Galantha, Elena; "Modified silver stain for Treponema pallidum", American Journal of Clinical Pathology, 2:63, 1932
- de Galantha, Elena; "Technic for preservation and microscopic demonstration of nodules in gout", American Journal of Clinical Pathology, 5:165, 1935
- de Galantha, Elena; "A new stain for connective tissue, mucin, and allied substances", American Journal of Clinical Pathology, 6:196-197, 1936
- de Galantha, Elena; "Improved method for rapid decalcification", American Journal of Clinical Pathology, (Tech. Supp.), 7(May):10-11, 1937
- de Galantha, Elena; "Reticulum silver impregnation for old formaldehyde-fixed tissue", Archives of Pathology, 47(3):301-301, 1949
