= William W. Hagerty =

American academic administrator

William Walsh Hagerty (June 10, 1916 – January 14, 1986) was an American teacher, former NASA Adviser, and president of Drexel University.

== Early life ==
Born to William Walsh Hagerty and Alice Amanda (née Lindberg) Hagerty in 1916 Hagerty was raised in Minnesota. In 1939 Hagerty received a B.S. in mechanical engineering from the University of Minnesota. Hagerty went on to receive his M.S. in 1943 and his Ph.D. in 1947 from the University of Michigan. After receiving his first degree Hagerty worked as an engineer until 1940.

== Teaching ==
From 1940 to 1963 Hagerty taught at Villanova University, the University of Cincinnati, the University of Michigan, the University of Delaware, and the University of Texas. While at the University of Delaware he served as dean at the University's School of Engineering from 1955 to 1958 and went on to serve as dean of the College of Engineering at the University of Texas from 1958 until 1963.

== Drexel University ==
Hagerty was appointed as president of the Drexel Institute of Technology in 1963. While president Hagerty was responsible for expanding the campus, adding new colleges and programs to the curriculum, and doubling the facilities. He created the College of Science, the College of Humanities and Social Sciences and oversaw the construction of new buildings for the College of Business Administration, College of Science, Nesbitt College of Design, Nutrition, Human Behavior, and Home Economics (formerly the College of Home Economics).

He was also responsible for doubling enrollment to over 12,500 students, granting more degrees than all of the previous presidents combined, and increasing the budget from $8 million to $80 million. In 1970 Hagerty was responsible for guiding the school through its transition to University status. In October 1983 the new library was named W. W. Hagerty after him.

During his tenure at Drexel Hagerty was appointed to the board of directors of the Communications Satellite Corporation in 1965 by President Lyndon B. Johnson. From 1964 to 1970 Hagerty was an advisor to NASA and served as a board member to the National Science Foundation. He was a member of the Philadelphia chapter of the Pennsylvania Society of Professional Engineers, the Philadelphia Commission on Higher Education and was the Director of the Commission of Engineering Education. He was the recipient of the Bliss Medal, awarded by the Society of American Military Engineers in 1967 and named Engineer of the Year in 1970 by the Pennsylvania Society of Professional Engineers.

After his resignation on August 31, 1984, Hagerty moved to Skidaway Island, Georgia. He died of cancer two years later in Savannah on January 14, 1986.
