= Mervin Glennie =

English cricketer and British Army officer

Personal information
- Full name: Mervin Stephen Glennie
- Born: 2 October 1918; Tours, Indre-et-Loire, France
- Died: 16 January 1986 (aged 67); Monken Hadley, Hertfordshire, England
- Batting: Right-handed
- Role: Wicket-keeper

Domestic team information
- Years: Team
- 1939: Cambridge University
- 1947: Marylebone Cricket Club

Career statistics
Competition	First-class
Matches	3
Runs scored	19
Batting average	3.80
100s/50s	–/–
Top score	11
Catches/stumpings	2/2
- Source: Cricinfo, 31 August 2021

Mervin Stephen Glennie (23 September 1918 — 16 January 1986) was an English first-class cricketer and a businessperson in the oil industry.

Glennie was born in France at Tours in September 1918. He was educated at Sherborne School, before going up to Caius College, Cambridge. A member of the Cambridge University Cricket Club, Glennie made two first-class appearances for the club in 1937 against Northamptonshire and Middlesex. Following the Second World War, Glennie made a single first-class appearance for the Marylebone Cricket Club against Oxford University at Lord's. A wicket-keeper, he took two catches and stumpings in his three matches. He was involved in the oil industry, where he was a manager for BP and the Iranian Oil Consortium. Glennie died in January 1986 at Monken Hadley Common in Hertfordshire.
