= Moritz Daublebsky-Sterneck =

Moritz Georg Josef Franz Maria Freiherr Daublebsky-Sterneck (29 February 1912 – 10 January 1986) was an Austrian Righteous Among the Nations.

== Life ==
He was the son of Moritz Jakob Daublebsky von Sterneck (1871–1917) and his wife Maria Freiin Salvadori von Wiesenhof (1872–1962), and studied Legal science, in which he received a doctor.

Dr. Daublebsky-Sterneck served as an Officer of the Wehrmacht in Slovakia, where he had a small house in the village of Borice, shared with his relatives.

When the Wehrmacht engaged Slovakia, the Viennese Jews Magdalena Livia Dubnicka and her mother escaped into the Slovak mountains, where they came into the village of Borice. Finding Dr. Daublebsky-Sterneks house, they asked for shelter. He agreed to hide them, even though he knew that hiding Jews was punished with death. He cared for them for a long time, until he learned that another villager got suspicious.

He told Magdalena and her mother about the growing risk, so they got afraid to stay in his house any longer. They decided to travel back to their hometown, hoping that the Germans gave up searching for them. Dr. Daublebsky-Sternek knew that the only way out of the village was a bridge across the river Vaeh, which was guarded by German soldiers. So he put on his Wehrmacht uniform and led the two Jews across the bridge, covered under the gloom of night.

Magdalena and her mother successfully crossed the river, but were eventually arrested by Germans shortly after. They were transferred to the Ravensbrück concentration camp where the mother died. Magdalena later was again transferred to the Bergen-Belsen concentration camp where she survived until the liberation.

A tree for Dr. Daublebsky-Sterneck was later planted in the garden of the Righteous among the Nations in Yad Vashem.
