= Lennox Johnston =

British physician

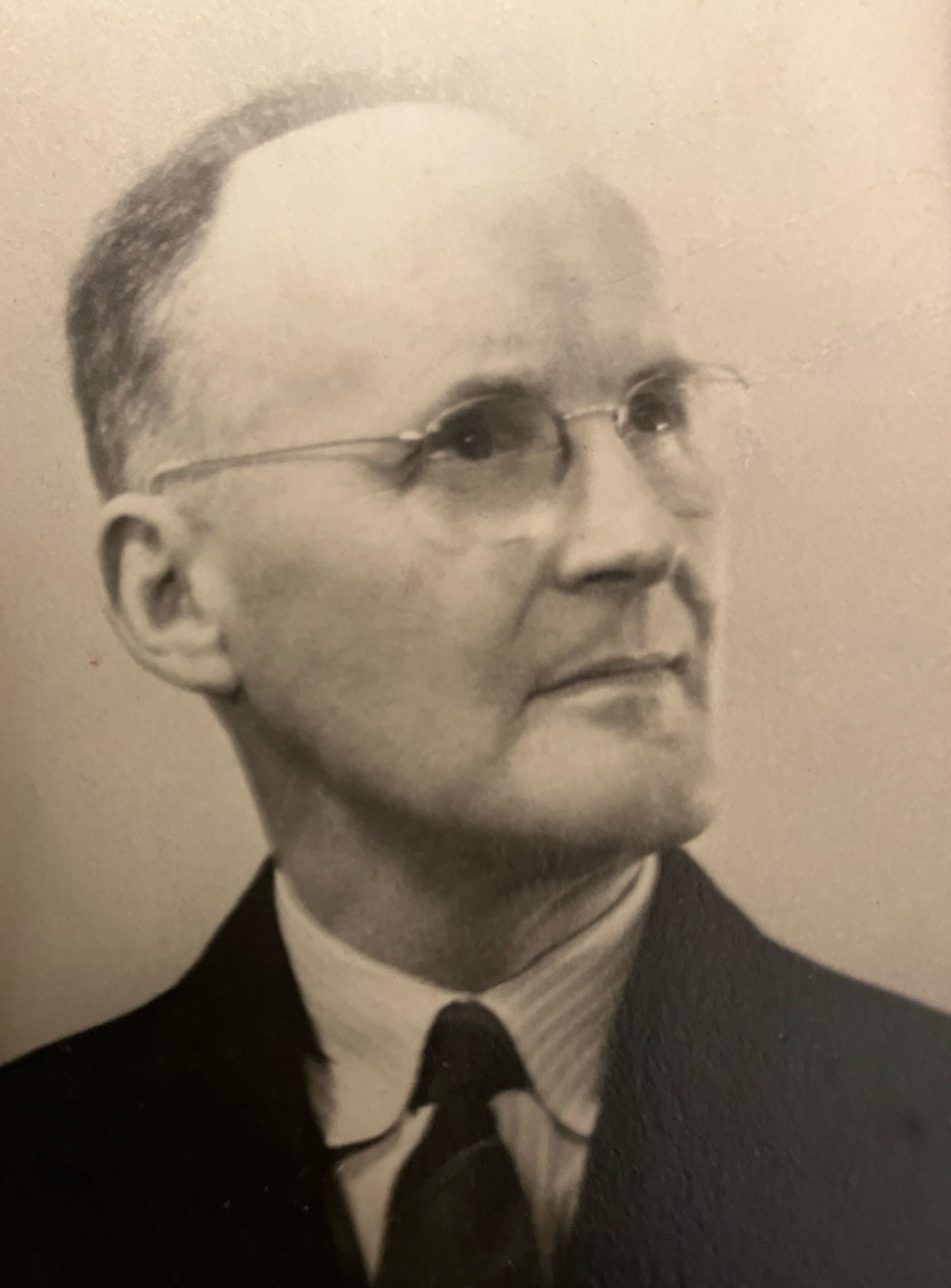
Lennox Johnston around 1949

Lennox Johnston (15 May 1899 – 18 January 1986) was a Glaswegian GP and amateur scientist who pioneered research in the addictiveness of nicotine in the 1930s and campaigned against the harmful effects of smoking. Although initially dismissed, he was fully justified and was honored by the Royal College of Physicians in 1976, where Sir Cyril Clarke likened his contribution to that of the work by Semmelweis on preventing sepsis.

== Early life ==
Johnston was born in Loanhead, Scotland, just south of Edinburgh. Educated at Ayr Academy and Glasgow University, he graduated MB, ChB in 1921, having served as a medical student in Royal Navy minesweepers in the North Sea during the First World War. He started to smoke at the age of 16 and continued for 12 years. He was married to his wife, Frieda, for 55 years. They had a son, Ivor, and two daughters, Heather and Sandra.

== Career ==
In a paper published in the Lancet in 1942 titled Tobacco smoking and nicotine, he identified smoking as one of the main causes of lung cancer and effectively became one of the first anti-smoking campaigners by suggesting a total ban on smoking.

His views were based on an experiment of his own device in which he injected himself with heavy doses of nicotine, almost killing himself several times in the process. He subsequently enlisted the help of 35 volunteers and found that they eventually preferred nicotine injections to cigarettes.

In the 1950s, Dr Johnston was refused research funding by the Medical Research Council, and his key paper was rejected by the (pipe-smoking) editor of the British Medical Journal. After storming out of the editorial offices shouting ‘Addict! Addict! Addict!’ he devised a plan to burn down the headquarters of the BMA, on which, according to his memoirs, he reflected ‘many hundreds of time in bed at night’.

He was the president of the National Society of Non-Smokers for many years.

In 1957, he published a short book titled The disease of tobacco smoking and its cure.

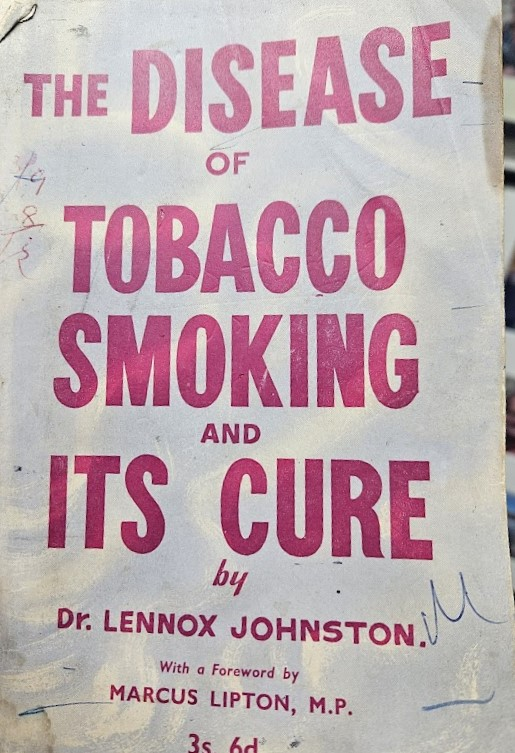
The disease of tobacco smoking and its cure by Lennox Johnston, 1957
