= Jim Quinn (Australian footballer) =

Australian rules footballer, born 1904

Personal information
- Full name: James Frederick Quinn
- Born: 18 November 1904; West Melbourne, Victoria
- Died: 3 January 1986 (aged 81); Yagoona, New South Wales
- Height: 187 cm (6 ft 2 in)
- Weight: 88 kg (194 lb)
- Position: Ruck / Forward

Playing career^{1}
Years	Club	Games (Goals)
1925–31	Essendon	66 (59)
- ^{1} Playing statistics correct to the end of 1931.

James Frederick Quinn BEM (18 November 1904 – 3 January 1986) was an Australian rules footballer who played with Essendon in the Victorian Football League (VFL).

== Family ==
The son of John Quinn (1870–1941) and Janet Quinn, nee McFarlane (1871–1956), James Frederick Quinn was born in West Melbourne on 18 November 1904.

== Football ==
Quinn was a useful follower and forward who became a regular senior player and kicked 59 goals in his time with Essendon, who were disappointed to lose him when he moved to Sydney for work-related reasons.

== Naval cartography ==
Quinn worked as a naval cartographer and for his work in chart correction for the Royal Australian Navy he was awarded the British Empire Medal in 1960.
