= Jessie Scott Hathcock =

American civil rights leader

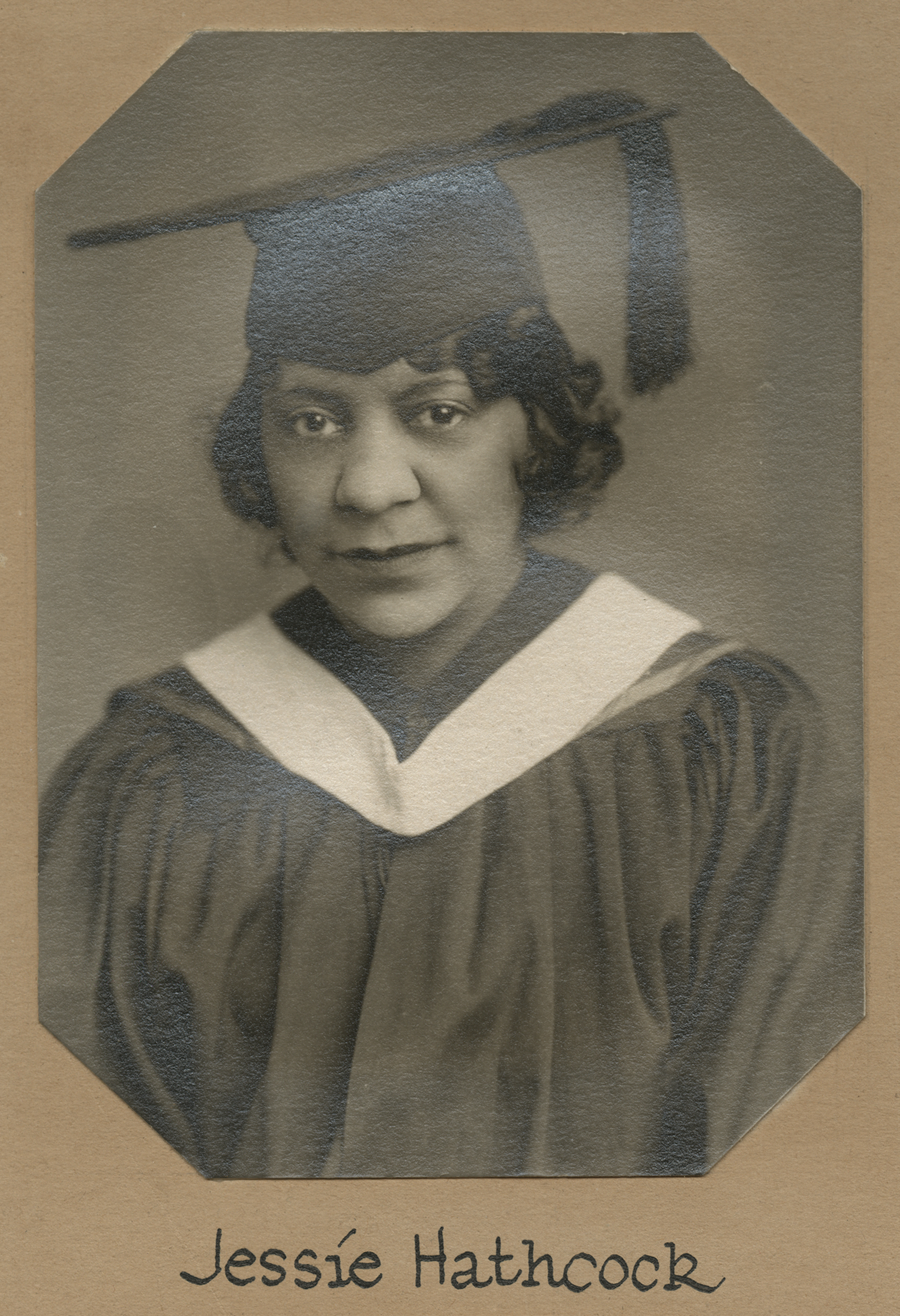
Jessie Hathcock graduation photo, University of Dayton, 1930

Jessie Valeria Scott Hathcock (April 24, 1894 – January 30, 1986) was an American humanitarian, educator, and civil rights leader active in Dayton, Ohio. In 1930, she became the first African American woman to graduate from the University of Dayton and earned a bachelor's degree in education.

== Early life and education ==
Jesse Valeria Scott was born in Worthington, Ohio. Her father was the eldest of nine siblings and put all eight of his younger siblings through college, which inspired her later devotion to education. She started her higher education at Otterbein University before moving to Dayton in 1914 when she married Dr. Lloyd Hathcock (d. 1935). In 1930, she completed her bachelor's degree in Education and became the first African American woman to graduate from the University of Dayton. In May 1930, author and civil rights leader W.E.B. DuBois wrote to the university, inquiring about the number of African American students at the university for an upcoming article in the NAACP magazine The Crisis. In the university's response, Brother Joseph Muench, S.M., secretary to the university's president, notes that the only African American student at the time was Jessie S. Hathcock who had recently graduated with a "satisfactory" record. According to Muench, while African American students were admitted to night classes and law school, they were generally barred from day classes due to the university's large number of students from Southern states.

After graduating from the University of Dayton, Hathcock received her master's degree in Guidance in 1932 from Wittenberg College (renamed Wittenberg University in 1957) in Springfield, Ohio. She went on to pursue a Ph.D. from Ohio State University but withdrew to travel internationally. On April 30, 1978, Hathcock received an honorary doctorate of humanities from the University of Dayton, making her the first African American woman to do so.

== Career and community work ==
Before Hathcock was an English teacher and Dean of Girls at Dunbar High School, she worked as a visiting teacher at Dayton Public Schools. After 34 years at Dunbar, she retired in 1964, working briefly as an English professor at Sinclair Community College in 1966. She referred to her students at the college as her "proteges". Hathcock was also Dean of Girls and an English teacher at Dunbar High School. While at Dunbar, Hathcock organized the Dunbar Parent-Teacher Association, Student Council, Junior Council on World Affairs, Personality Club, and Junior Red Cross. She encouraged her students to pursue higher education, assisting with payments for their college applications and writing to colleges on their behalf. Before her retirement from Dunbar, she used money raised from her own travelogues to set up a scholarship for students.

Hathcock was also involved in the Dayton community. After visiting India and witnessing begging and starving children, her founding and chairmanship of the Dayton and Miami Valley Committee for UNICEF in 1966 earned her the nickname, "Mrs. Unicef". She also held positions on the Dayton Council of World Affairs, Volunteers of America, City Beautiful Council, Wegerzyn Garden Center board, YWCA, the American Association of University Women, and the Women's Board of Children's Medical Center (now known as Dayton Children's Hospital). Hathcock was also a charter member of the Beta Eta Omega chapter of Alpha Kappa Alpha sorority, serving as its first president in 1934. Hathcock was a member of the Bridgettes, a group of socialites and civic service activists who met bi-weekly to play bridge and to host events in the Dayton community.

Hathcock's community service activities also addressed legal issues. She and the NAACP assisted Andrew Freeman, a man accused of killing a police officer and sentenced to death. They proved that the trial had been unfair, eventually securing a new trial where Freeman was cleared of all charges.

== Honors and awards ==
Jessie Hathcock received many awards for her academic and humanitarian achievements. She received the Outstanding Women's Award from the Beta Chi chapter of Iota Phi Lambda in 1963, and in 1967, she was named one of the Ten Top Women in Dayton. Hathcock was also the recipient of the City Beautiful award for her refurbishing of an abandoned home.

In 2004, the University of Dayton started the Jessie V. Scott Hathcock Memorial scholarship for female, African American students majoring in education or English, with a preference for residents from the city of Dayton. The University of Dayton named its computer science building the Jessie S. Hathcock Hall in honor of her in January 2021.

== Personal life ==
As a prominent member of the Dayton community, Hathcock used her influence to invite well-known speakers, scholars and activists to speak in Dayton. These guests included Langston Hughes, James Weldon Johnson, and W.E.B. DuBois. In February 1940, Hathcock brought DuBois to Dayton for a talk on "Democracy and the Darker Races". DuBois and Hathcock maintained a correspondence from 1925 to 1951.

During World War II, she fought against racial prejudice in the Air Force. Her son, Lt. Lloyd "Scotty" Hathcock was a Tuskegee Airman who spent 11 months as a prisoner of war in Stalag Luft III and Stalag VIII-A near the town of Sagan (Żagań, Poland as of 1945).

She died Jan. 30, 1986, and is buried in Walnut Grove Cemetery in Worthington, Franklin County, Ohio
