= Tony Scornavacca =

American painter

Tony Scornavacca (June 9, 1926 – January 25, 1986) was an American painter from Newark, New Jersey, and the son of Sicilian immigrants.

== Biography ==
=== Early life and education ===
After serving in the U.S. Navy in World War II, he studied commercial art at Pratt Institute in Brooklyn.

=== Career ===
In 1950 Scornavacca moved to Miami where he continued his studies before becoming a successful artist and gallery owner. He painted in oils with the subject matter varying from abstracts to landscapes to the human figure. It is estimated that he produced 2,000 paintings and drawings throughout his career.

In 1955 he married Angela Mantovani and they raised three daughters and a son in Coconut Grove, Miami, Florida.

Along with other artists such as Eugene Massin and Jack Amoroso, he was one of the founders of the Coconut Grove Arts Festival in 1962.

He spent many summers in Southampton, NY where he also had a gallery.

Scornavacca was a true artist in the sense that public demand did not dictate what he painted. This made being both the artist and gallery owner difficult for him. He never, however, turned down a commission to do a portrait - this is where his genius draftsmanship and ability to capture a subject's soul on canvas was prevalent.

Scornavacca's work is included in hundreds of private collections and in the permanent collections of the High Museum of Art in Atlanta and the Hood Museum of Art at Dartmouth College. He was also the recipient of many distinguished awards, both locally and nationally.

=== Death ===
He died January 25, 1986, in the Miami VA Hospital after a year-long battle with lung cancer.
