= Dorothy Dunbar Bromley =

Dorothy Dunbar Bromley (December 25, 1896 – January 3, 1986) was an American journalist and early writer on birth control and women's issues.

== Early life ==
Bromley was born Dorothy Ewing Dunbar on December 25, 1896, in Ottawa, Illinois. She attended Northwestern University, serving as a member of the US Army Signal Corps and graduating magna cum laude in 1918. After college she moved to New York City, where she became a widely known journalist and lived for the majority of her professional life.

== Career ==
Bromley did publicity and editorial work for Henry Holt and Company (1921–1924) and was a columnist and writer for the New York World-Telegram (1935–1937), the New York Post (1938–1940) and the New York Herald Tribune (1942–1952), of which she was also editor for the Sunday women's activities page. Bromley also wrote freelance for various magazines from 1925 to 1934, including The Nation, The New York Times Magazine, The New Leader, Good Housekeeping, Harper's and McCall's.

Bromley had long written on new, controversial, or radical issues in her freelance work. Her October 1927 article for Harper's, "Feminist—New Style" introduced the idea of the "New Woman". It discussed the old stereotypes of feminists and an emerging model for a "new" type of feminist, made up of an "increasing group of young women in their twenties and thirties who are the truly modern ones, those who admit that a full life calls for marriage and children as well as a career." These new women exhibited a new "individualistic approach to both personal and professional life". Furthermore, there was increasingly a pull away from the previous generation of women that had preceded this new brand of feminism. Bromley's other freelance work covered topics such as divorce, voting, criminal law and educational legislation in the United States, Britain and France.

Her newspaper work also discussed a broad range of issues. In her regular column for the New York World-Telegram, Bromley wrote on birth control, marriage and divorce, sexual stereotypes, women and work, and women and the legal system. As an editor and columnist for the New York Herald Tribune, Bromley continued writing on various women's interests, from educational reform in the city's schools to German prisoners of war and starvation in Europe and India. Her column in the New York Post entitled "Strike a Balance" covered the political climate in Europe during the rise of Nazism and fascism. Other articles covered Depression era social welfare programs, child and domestic labor, juvenile delinquency, and criminal rehabilitation.

In addition to her work as a journalist, Bromley published four books: Birth Control, Its Use and Misuse; (coauthor) Youth and Sex: a Study of 1300 College Students; Catholics and Birth Control; and Washington and Vietnam. Her book Birth Control, Its Use and Misuse, was a product of Bromley's visits to maternity clinics in New York City, and was the first work on birth control methods for the general public. In 1967, Bromley also expressed interest in writing a biography of Dr. Martin Luther King, Jr., although this did not come to fruition.

Towards the end of her career, Bromley continued her interest in social causes by becoming involved in several organizations. From 1952 to 1958, she was "conductor" for "Report to the People", a program on radio station WMCA. She served as secretary of the New York State Committee for the White House Conference on Children and Youth (1959–1960); was on the board of the American Civil Liberties Union; and was a member of Americans for Democracy and Phi Beta Kappa. Bromley was also the recipient of prizes from the New York Newspaper Women's Club in 1936 and 1944.

== Personal ==
Bromley's first marriage to Donald C. Bromley ended in divorce in 1924, and she married Stanley Ward Walker, an insurance salesman, in 1947. Walker died in 1964. Bromley lived in New York City until about 1976, when she moved to a retirement community in Pennsylvania; there she served as co-editor of the community newsletter, "The Kendal Reporter". Bromley died of pneumonia on January 3, 1986, at age 89.

== Works ==
- Birth Control, Its Use and Misuse, Harper, 1934
- Youth and Sex (with Florence H. Britten), Harper and Row, 1938
- Catholics and Birth Control, Devin Adair, 1965
- Washington and Vietnam, Oceana, 1966
