= List of Delta Omega chapters =

Delta Omega is an international honorary society for public health. It was founded in 1924 at the Bloomberg School of Public Health at Johns Hopkins University in Baltimore, Maryland. In the following list, active chapters are noted in bold and inactive chapters are in italics.

Chapter	Charter date and range	Institution	Location	State	Status	Ref.
**Alpha**	May 14, 1924 – March 1942; 1978	Johns Hopkins Bloomberg School of Public Health	Baltimore, Maryland	MD	Active	
Beta	October 15, 1924 – 1944; 1948–1969	Harvard T.H. Chan School of Public Health	Boston, Massachusetts	MA	Inactive	
Gamma (First)	October 15, 1924 – 1944	Massachusetts Institute of Technology	Cambridge, Massachusetts	MA	Inactive, Reassigned	(Note: MIT no longer has a public health program.)
Delta	December 1924 – 1944; 1948–1971	University of Michigan School of Public Health	Ann Arbor, Michigan	MI	Inactive	(Note: The original installation date for this chapter is conjectural, based on The History stating that Delta and Epsilon chapters were approved "later that year", after Beta and Gamma, which were chartered on October 15, 1924.)
Epsilon	December 1924–March 1944	Yale School of Public Health	New Haven, Connecticut	CT	Inactive	
Zeta	March 1926–1944; 1948–1971	UC Berkeley School of Public Health	Berkeley, California	CA	Inactive	
**Eta**	1950	Tulane University School of Public Health and Tropical Medicine	New Orleans, Louisiana	LA	Active	
**Theta**	1953	UNC Gillings School of Global Public Health	Chapel Hill, North Carolina	NC	Active	
**Iota**	1953	UCLA Fielding School of Public Health	Los Angeles, California	CA	Active	
**Kappa**	1971	Loma Linda University School of Public Health	Loma Linda, California	CA	Active	
**Lambda**	1980	University of Illinois at Chicago School of Public Health	Chicago, Illinois	IL	Active	
**Mu**	1978	University of South Carolina Arnold School of Public Health	Columbia, South Carolina	SC	Active	
Nu	1978–20xx ?	University of Washington School of Public Health	Seattle, Washington	WA	Inactive	
**Xi**	1978	Hudson College of Public Health	Oklahoma City, Oklahoma	OK	Active	
**Omicron**	1984	University of Pittsburgh School of Public Health	Pittsburgh, Pennsylvania	PA	Active	
**Pi**	1985	University of Minnesota School of Public Health	Minneapolis, Minnesota	MN	Active	
**Rho**	1985	University of Massachusetts Amherst School of Public Health and Health Sciences	Amherst, Massachusetts	MA	Active	
Sigma	1985	San Diego State University School of Public Health	San Diego, California	CA	Inactive	
**Tau**	1987	University of South Florida College of Public Health	Tampa, Florida	FL	Active	
**Upsilon**	1989	University of Alabama at Birmingham School of Public Health	Birmingham, Alabama	AL	Active	
**Phi**	1992	Rollins School of Public Health	Atlanta, Georgia	GA	Active	
Chi	1993 ? –20xx ?	University of Puerto Rico, Medical Sciences Campus	San Juan, Puerto Rico	PR	Inactive	
**Psi**	1996	Uniformed Services University of the Health Sciences	Bethesda, Maryland	MD	Active	
**Omega**	1995	Milken Institute School of Public Health	Washington, D.C.	DC	Active	
**Alpha Beta**	1987	Boston University School of Public Health	Boston, Massachusetts	MA	Active	
**Alpha Delta**	1998	Saint Louis University College for Public Health and Social Justice	St. Louis, Missouri	MO	Active	
**Alpha Gamma**	1999	University at Albany, SUNY College of Integrated Health Sciences	Albany, New York	NY	Active	
Alpha Epsilon	1999	Ohio State University College of Public Health	Columbus, Ohio	OH	Inactive	
**Alpha Zeta**	2001	Northern Illinois University	DeKalb, Illinois	IL	Active	
**Alpha Eta**	2001	Rutgers School of Public Health	New Brunswick, New Jersey	NJ	Active	
**Alpha Theta**	2000	University of Utah Public Health Program	Salt Lake City, Utah	UT	Active	
**Alpha Iota**	2001	University of Texas Health Science Center at Houston	Houston, Texas	TX	Active	
**Alpha Kappa**	2001	Old Dominion University	Norfolk, Virginia	VA	Active	
Alpha Lambda	2001	Morehouse School of Medicine	Houston, Texas	GA	Inactive	
**Alpha Mu**	2001	Florida A&M University Public Health Program	Tallahassee, Florida	FL	Active	
**Alpha Nu**	2001	University of Arizona Mel and Enid Zuckerman College of Public Health	Tucson, Arizona	AR	Active	
**Alpha Xi**	2005	Nova Southeastern University Department of Public Health	Fort Lauderdale, Florida	FL	Active	
Alpha Omicron	2003–20xx ?	Medical College of Wisconsin Public Health Program	Milwaukee, Wisconsin	WI	Inactive	
**Alpha Pi**	2003	East Tennessee State University College of Public Health	Johnson City, Tennessee	TN	Active	
**Alpha Rho**	2004	Tufts University School of Medicine Public Health Program	Boston, Massachusetts	MA	Active	
**Alpha Sigma**	2003	University of North Texas Health Science Center	Fort Worth, Texas	TX	Active	
**Alpha Tau**	2003	Texas A&M University School of Public Health	College Station, Texas	TX	Active	
**Alpha Upsilon**	2003	Colorado School of Public Health	Aurora, Colorado	CO	Active	(Note: This chapter served the University of Colorado, Colorado State University, and the University of Northern Colorado.)
**Alpha Phi**	2003	University of Iowa College of Public Health	Iowa City, Iowa	IA	Active	
**Alpha Chi**	2005	Consortium of Eastern Ohio Master of Public Health	Ohio	OH	Active	(Note: The CEOMPH is a partnership between the University of Akron, Cleveland State University, Northeast Ohio Medical University, and Youngstown State University.)
**Alpha Psi**	2006	LSU Health Sciences Center New Orleans	New Orleans, Louisiana	LA	Active	
**Alpha Omega**	2006	Robert Stempel College of Public Health and Social Work	Westchester, Florida	FL	Active	
Beta Alpha	2006–20xx ?	East Stroudsburg University of Pennsylvania Public Health Program	East Stroudsburg, Pennsylvania	PA	Inactive	
**Beta Gamma**	2006	University of Kentucky College of Public Health	Lexington, Kentucky	KY	Active	
**Beta Delta**	2006	University of Arkansas for Medical Sciences Fay W. Boozman College of Public Health	Little Rock, Arkansas	AR	Active	
Beta Epsilon	2006	Morgan State University Public Health Program	Baltimore, Maryland	MD	Inactive	
**Beta Zeta**	2006	Richard M. Fairbanks School of Public Health	Indianapolis, Indiana	IN	Active	
**Beta Iota**	2006	SUNY Downstate Health Sciences University School of Public Health	New York City, New York	NY	Active	
Beta Eta	2007–20xx ?	Feinberg School of Medicine Program in Public Health	Chicago, Illinois	IL	Inactive	
Beta Theta	2007–20xx ?	Temple University College of Public Health	Philadelphia, Pennsylvania	PA	Inactive	
Beta Kappa	2007–20xx ?	Armstrong Atlantic State University Master of Public Health Program in Community Health Education	Savannah, Georgia	GA	Inactive	
**Beta Lambda**	2009	University of Southern California Programs in Public Health	Los Angeles, California	CA	Active	
Beta Mu (First)		University of Toledo Master of Public Health Program	Toledo, Ohio	OH	Inactive	
Beta Nu	2009	University of Pennsylvania Master of Public Health Program	Philadelphia, Pennsylvania	PA	Inactive	
**Beta Xi**	2006	West Chester University Master of Public Health Program	West Chester, Pennsylvania	PA	Active	
**Beta Omicron**	2008	Icahn School of Medicine at Mount SinaiGraduate Program in Public Health	New York City, New York	NY	Active	
**Beta Pi**	2008	University of Louisville School of Public Health and Information Sciences	Louisville, Kentucky	KY	Active	
**Beta Rho**	2008	University of Connecticut Graduate Program in Public Health	Storrs, Connecticut	CT	Active	
**Beta Sigma**	2009	University of Miami Department of Public Health Sciences	Miami, Florida	FL	Active	
**Beta Tau**	2010	University of Maryland School of Medicine Public Health Programs	Baltimore, Maryland	MD	Active	
**Beta Upsilon**	November 2009	University of Florida College of Public Health and Health Professions	Gainesville, Florida	FL	Active	
**Beta Phi**	2010	University of North Carolina at Charlotte Public Health Programs	Charlotte, North Carolina	NC	Active	
**Beta Chi**	2010	University of Georgia College of Public Health	Athens, Georgia	GA	Active	
Beta Psi	2010–20xx ?	Meharry Medical College Department of Public Health	Nashville, Tennessee	TN	Inactive	
**Beta Omega**	2010	Drexel University Dornsife School of Public Health	Philadelphia, Pennsylvania	PA	Active	
**Gamma** **(Second)**	2010	University of Hawaiʻi at Mānoa Public Health Program	Honolulu, Hawaii	HI	Active	
**Gamma Alpha**	2010	Boonshoft School of Medicine Master of Public Health Program	Dayton, Ohio	OH	Active	
**Beta Mu**	2011	Northwest Ohio Consortium for Public Health	Ohio	OH	Active	(Note: The NOCPH is a partnership between the University of Toledo and Bowling Green State University.)
**Gamma Beta**	2014	Indiana University School of Public Health-Bloomington	Bloomington, Indiana	IN	Active	
**Gamma Delta**	2011	American University of Beirut Faculty of Health Sciences, Graduate Public Health Program	Beirut, Lebanon		Active	
**Gamma Epsilon**	February 1, 2011	University of New Mexico College of Population Health	Albuquerque, New Mexico	NM	Active	
**Gamma Zeta**	March 1, 2011	University of Maryland School of Public Health	College Park, Maryland	MD	Active	
**Gamma Eta**	September 1, 2011	University of Missouri College of Health Sciences	Columbia, Missouri	MO	Active	
**Gamma Theta**	October 1, 2011	Jiann-Ping Hsu College of Public Health	Statesboro, Georgia	GA	Active	
Gamma Iota	2012	University of Alaska Anchorage Master of Public Health Program	Anchorage, Alaska	AK	Inactive	
**Gamma Kappa**	February 1, 2012	St. George's University Department of Public Health and Preventive Medicine	True Blue, Grenada		Active	
**Gamma Lambda**	February 1, 2011	University at Buffalo	Buffalo, New York	NY	Active	
**Gamma Mu**	2012	West Virginia University School of Public Health	Morgantown, West Virginia	WV	Active	
**Gamma Nu**	December 1, 2012	Northeastern University Master of Public Health Program	Boston, Massachusetts	MA	Active	
**Gamma Omicron**	2013	University of Nebraska Medical Center College of Public Health	Omaha, Nebraska	NE	Active	
**Gamma Pi**	2013	University of Virginia Master of Public Health Program	Charlottesville, Virginia	VA	Active	
**Gamma Xi**	2013	University of Wisconsin–Madison Master of Public Health Program	Madison, Wisconsin	WI	Active	
**Gamma Rho**	April 1, 2013	University of Cincinnati College of Medicine Master of Public Health Program	Cincinnati, Ohio	OH	Active	
**Gamma Sigma**	April 1, 2013	Washington University in St. Louis Brown School Public Health Programs	St. Louis, Missouri	MO	Active	
**Gamma Tau**	2014	George Mason University College of Public Health	Fairfax, Virginia	VA	Active	
**Gamma Upsilon**	2014	Georgia State University School of Public Health	Atlanta, Georgia	GA	Active	
Gamma Phi	2014	Charles R. Drew University of Medicine and Science Master of Public Health Program in Urban Public Health	Willowbrook, California	CA	Inactive	
**Gamma Chi**	2014	University of New England Graduate Program in Public Health	Biddeford, Maine	ME	Active	
**Gamma Psi**	2014	National University Master of Public Health	San Diego, California	CA	Active	
Gamma Omega	2015	Benedictine University College of Education and Health Services Master of Public Health Program	Lisle, Illinois	IL	Inactive	
**Delta Alpha**	2015	New York Medical College School of Health Sciences and Practice	Valhalla, New York	NY	Active	
**Delta Beta**	2015	New York University School of Global Public Health	New York City, New York	NY	Active	
**Delta Gamma**	2016	A.T. Still University College of Graduate Health Studies	Virtual campus		Active	
**Delta Epsilon**	2016	Claremont Graduate University	Claremont, California	CA	Active	
**Delta Zeta**	2016	Mercer University Department of Public Health	Macon, Georgia	GA	Active	
**Delta Eta**	2017	Virginia Commonwealth University School of Public Health	Richmond, Virginia	VA	Active	
**Delta Theta**	July 15, 2016	University of Nevada, Las Vegas School of Public Health	Paradise, Nevada	NV	Active	
**Delta Iota**	2017	Geisel School of Medicine Graduate Programs	Hanover, New Hampshire	NH	Active	
**Delta Kappa**	2017	Hofstra University Master of Public Health Program	Hempstead, New York	NY	Active	
**Delta Lambda**	2019	Stony Brook University Program in Public Health	Stony Brook, New York	NY	Active	
**Delta Mu**	2017	Virginia Tech Public Health Program	Blacksburg, Virginia	VA	Active	
**Delta Nu**	June 1, 2017	University of Texas Medical Branch School of Public and Population Health	Galveston, Texas	TX	Active	
Delta Xi	July 1, 2017 – 20xx ?	University of North Florida Master of Public Health Program	Jacksonville, Florida	FL	Inactive	
Delta Omicron	2017	Loyola University Chicago, Parkinson School of Health Sciences and Public Health	Chicago, Illinois	IL	Inactive	
**Delta Pi**	June 1, 2018	Columbia University Mailman School of Public Health	New York City, New York	NY	Active	
**Delta Rho**	September 1, 2019	University of California, Irvine Joe C. Wen School of Population & Public Health	Irvine, California	CA	Active	
Delta Sigma	September 1, 2018	ECU Brody School of Medicine Graduate Programs in Public Health	Greenville, North Carolina	NC	Inactive	
**Delta Tau**	October 1, 2018	La Salle University Public Health Program	Philadelphia, Pennsylvania	PA	Active	
Delta Upsilon	December 1, 2018	William Paterson University College of Science and Health	Wayne, New Jersey	NJ	Inactive	
**Delta Phi**	February 1, 2018	University of Nevada, Reno School of Public Health	Reno, Nevada	NV	Active	
Delta Chi	March 1, 2019	National Taiwan University College of Public Health	Taipei, Taiwan		Inactive	
**Delta Psi**	May 1, 2019	Thomas Jefferson University, College of Population Health	Philadelphia, Pennsylvania	PA	Active	
**Delta Omega**		National Office	Arlington, Virginia	VA		
Epsilon Alpha	October 1, 2019	University of San Francisco Master of Public Health Program	San Francisco, California	CA	Inactive	
**Epsilon Beta**	December 1, 2019	University of Montana Master of Public Health Program	Missoula, Montana	MT	Active	
**Epsilon Gamma**	November 1, 2020	Kent State University College of Public Health	Kent, Ohio	OH	Active	
**Epsilon Delta**	September 1, 2020	LSU Health Sciences Center Shreveport	Shreveport, Louisiana	LA	Active	
Epsilon Zeta		University of Delaware	Newark, Delaware	DE	Active	
Epsilon Eta	November 1, 2020	Eastern Washington University Master of Public Health Program	Cheney, Washington	WA	Inactive	
Epsilon Theta		SUNY Brockport	Brockport, New York	NY	Active	
**Epsilon Iota**	December 1, 2020	Brown University School of Public Health	Providence, Rhode Island	RI	Active	
**Epsilon Kappa**	June 2017	Wayne State University Master of Public Health Program	Detroit, Michigan	MI	Active	
**Epsilon Lambda**		St. Catherine University Public Health Program	Saint Paul, Minnesota	MN	Active	
**Epsilon Mu**		Liberty University Master of Public Health Program	Lynchburg, Virginia	VA	Active	
Epsilon Nu		Syracuse University Falk College of Sport and Human Dynamics	Syracuse, New York	NY	Inactive	
**Epsilon Xi**		Central Michigan University Master of Public Health Program	Mount Pleasant, Michigan	MI	Active	
**Epsilon Omicron**		Robert Larner College of Medicine	Burlington, Vermont	VT	Active	
**Epsilon Pi**	2024	Michigan State University Master of Public Health Program	East Lansing, Michigan	MI	Active	
**Epsilon Rho**		University of West Florida Master of Public Health Program	Pensacola, Florida	FL	Active	
**Epsilon Sigma**		Appalachian State University Undergraduate Public Health Program	Boone, North Carolina	NC	Active	
**Epsilon Tau**	202x ?	California State University, San Marcos Master of Public Health Program	San Marcos, California	CA	Active	
Epsilon Upsilon					Unassigned	
**Epsilon Phi**		Albany College of Pharmacy and Health Sciences Undergraduate Public Health Program	Albany, New York	NY	Active	
**Epsilon Chi**	February 1, 2020	CUNY Graduate School of Public Health and Health Policy	New York City, New York	NY	Active	
**Epsilon Psi**	20xx ?	Chamberlain University Master of Public Health Program	Chicago, Illinois	IL	Active	
**Epsilon Omega**	2023	Fairfield University	Fairfield, Connecticut	CT	Active	
