= Tara C. Smith =

American epidemiologist and science communicator

Tara Smith
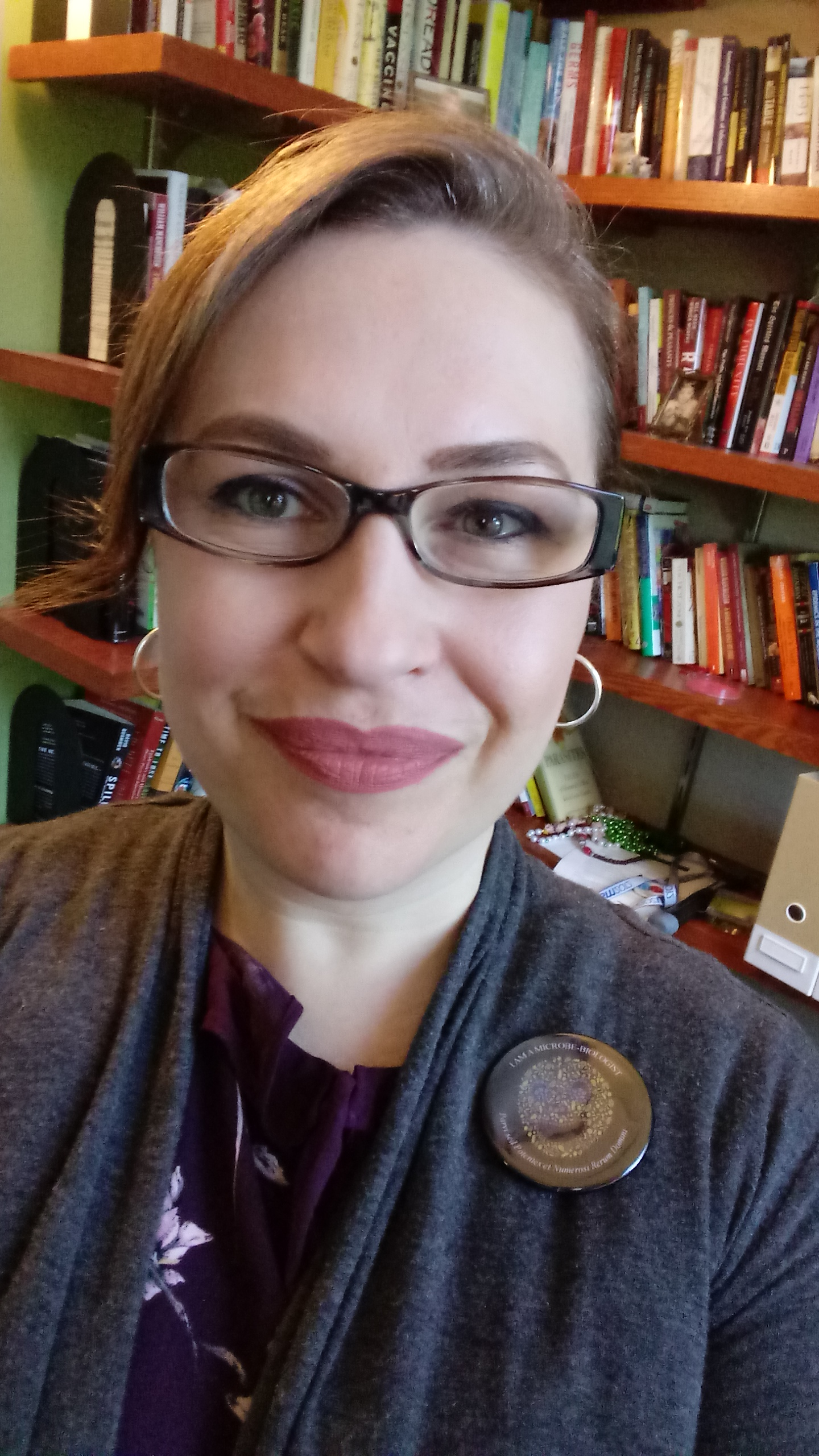
- Education: University of Toledo; Yale University
- Scientific career
- Workplaces: University of Iowa; Kent State University
- Website: taracsmith.com/

Tara C. Smith is an American epidemiologist and science communicator. She is a professor at the Kent State University College of Public Health who studies zoonotic infections. Smith was the first to identify strains of methicillin-resistant Staphylococcus aureus associated with livestock in the United States.

== Early life and education ==
Smith has a Bachelor of Science in biology from Yale University. She earned her PhD in microbiology at the University of Toledo, where she investigated Streptococcus pyogenes. She completed a two-year postdoctoral fellowship in infectious disease epidemiology at the University of Michigan.

== Career ==
In 2004 Smith joined the University of Iowa College of Public Health. She has received over $3 million in research funding, primarily from Agency for Healthcare Research and Quality, United States Department of Agriculture and National Institute for Occupational Safety and Health.

Smith identified that 45% of pig farmers and 49% of hogs farmers carried Methicillin-resistant Staphylococcus aureus (MRSA). She went on to identify that almost 40% of people with MRSA contain the strain associated with livestock. The work was described as one of the most comprehensive investigations into the spread of MRSA by the journal Nature. She is distinguishing the Staphylococcus aureus strains around Iowa City, by characterizing the DNA around several places in the genome. She compared strains related to ST398, a sequence type that is associated with livestock but not expected to cause infection, from around the world. She found that meat that is sold with the claim it contains no antibiotics contains the highest levels of the garden-type of S. aureus. Her research has been covered by The New York Times. Smith has also studied and written about vaccine hesitancy.

She joined the Kent State University College of Public Health in 2013 as an associate professor. In 2015 Smith was appointed an American Society for Microbiology Distinguished Lecturer. In 2017 she became a full professor at Kent State. Her light-hearted Christmas contribution to the British Medical Journal on the likelihood of a Zombie apocalypse was covered extensively in the mainstream media. Following the Zika virus outbreak, Smith wrote several articles to provide advice for members of the public. She went on to use zombies to demonstrate how diseases were spread. Smith has written books on Ebola virus, Streptococcus pyogenes and S. agalactiae.

In late February 2020 the Wall Street Journal called her "a prominent infectious-disease specialist" when reporting on her tweet criticizing the White House's attempt to control messaging about the novel coronavirus outbreak.

=== Public engagement ===
Smith takes part in several initiatives to improve the public understanding of science. She writes a regular column for Self. She started the science blog Aetiology in 2005. Her research has appeared in the popular science books Pig Tales: An Omnivore's Quest for Sustainable Meat and Superbug: the Fatal Menace of MRSA. She has featured on podcasts, including Science for the People, Talk Nerdy and the Meet the Microbiologist podcast of the American Society for Microbiology. She has been interviewed by Gizmodo, New Statesman and the Los Angeles Times.

=== Bibliography ===
- Ebola's Message (2016), co-edited by Maia Majumder and Nicholas Evans
- Ebola and Marburg Viruses (2010)
- Streptococcus (group A) (2010)
- Streptococcus (group B) (2007)

== Personal life ==
Smith lives with her partner and three children in rural Ohio.
