= Center for Public Health Preparedness =

The Centers for Public Health Preparedness (CPHP) program was established in 2000 by the Centers for Disease Control and Prevention (CDC) to strengthen bioterrorism and emergency preparedness by linking academic expertise to state and local health agency needs.

The original CPHP program closed in August 2010 and was replaced by the Preparedness and Emergency Response Learning Centers (PERLC) cooperative agreement program.

== Overview ==
In order to "enhance the public health practice activities within schools of public health," the CDC established a program called Academic Centers for Public Health Preparedness (A-CPHP) in 2000. These centers were awarded through a competitive submission process to four schools of public health (Saint Louis University, University of Alabama-Birmingham, University of California at Los Angeles and the University of Oklahoma). These initially funded centers formed a nucleus upon which to build a response to the events on September 11, 2001. Yet, with nearly 450,000 public health professionals dispersed throughout more than 3,000 state and local health agencies expected to protect the health of the U.S. population against threats that were previously considered unthinkable, the magnitude of the problem demanded more vigorous collaboration between the academy and the practice community. In 2001, the CDC and the Association of Schools of Public Health (ASPH) added resources to the A-CPHP that allowed for the stepwise expansion of the program to more schools of public health.

In 2009, there were 27 Council on Education for Public Health (CEPH)-accredited schools of public health with established and funded centers:

- Columbia University Mailman School of Public Health - Center for Public Health Preparedness
- Emory University - Emory Center for Public Health Preparedness
- Harvard University - Center for Public Health Preparedness
- Johns Hopkins University - Center for Public Health Preparedness
- Loma Linda University School of Public Health - Center for Public Health Preparedness
- Saint Louis University - Saint Louis University Heartland Center for Public Health Preparedness
- Texas A&M Health Science Center School of Rural Public Health - USA Center for Rural Public Health Preparedness
- Ohio State University - Ohio Center for Public Health Preparedness
- Tulane University - South Central Center for Public Health Preparedness
- University of Alabama at Birmingham - South Central Center for Public Health Preparedness
- University at Albany, SUNY - University at Albany Center for Public Health Preparedness
- University of Arizona - College of Public Health
- University of California, Berkeley - Center for Infectious Disease Preparedness
- University of California, Los Angeles - Center for Public Health and Disasters
- University of Illinois at Chicago - Illinois - Public Health Preparedness Center
- University of Iowa - Upper Midwest Preparedness and Emergency Response Learning Center
- University of Medicine and Dentistry of New Jersey - New Jersey Center for Public Health Preparedness at UMDNJ
- University of Michigan School of Public Health - Michigan Center for Public Health Preparedness (MI-CPHP)
- University of Minnesota - Center for Public Health Preparedness
- University of North Carolina - Center for Public Health Preparedness
- University of Oklahoma - Southwest Center for Public Health Preparedness
- University of Pittsburgh - Center for Public Health Preparedness
- University of South Carolina - Center for Public Health Preparedness
- University of South Florida - Florida Center for Public Health Preparedness
- University of Texas - Center for Biosecurity and Public Health Preparedness
- University of Washington - Northwest Center for Public Health Preparedness
- Yale University - Center for Public Health Preparedness

From 2004 to 2010, the CDC gave $134 million in funding to the Centers for Public Health Preparedness (CPHP) Cooperative Agreement program; 27 CPHPs within accredited schools of public health received the funds. The point of the program is to link academia and government public health professionals in order to improve public health response. According to the journal Public Health Reports, "In the late 1980s and early 1990s, public health practitioners identified the need to enhance partnerships between academia and the practice community and to assure a competent public health and health-care workforce."
