= Corinne Peek-Asa =

American epidemiologist

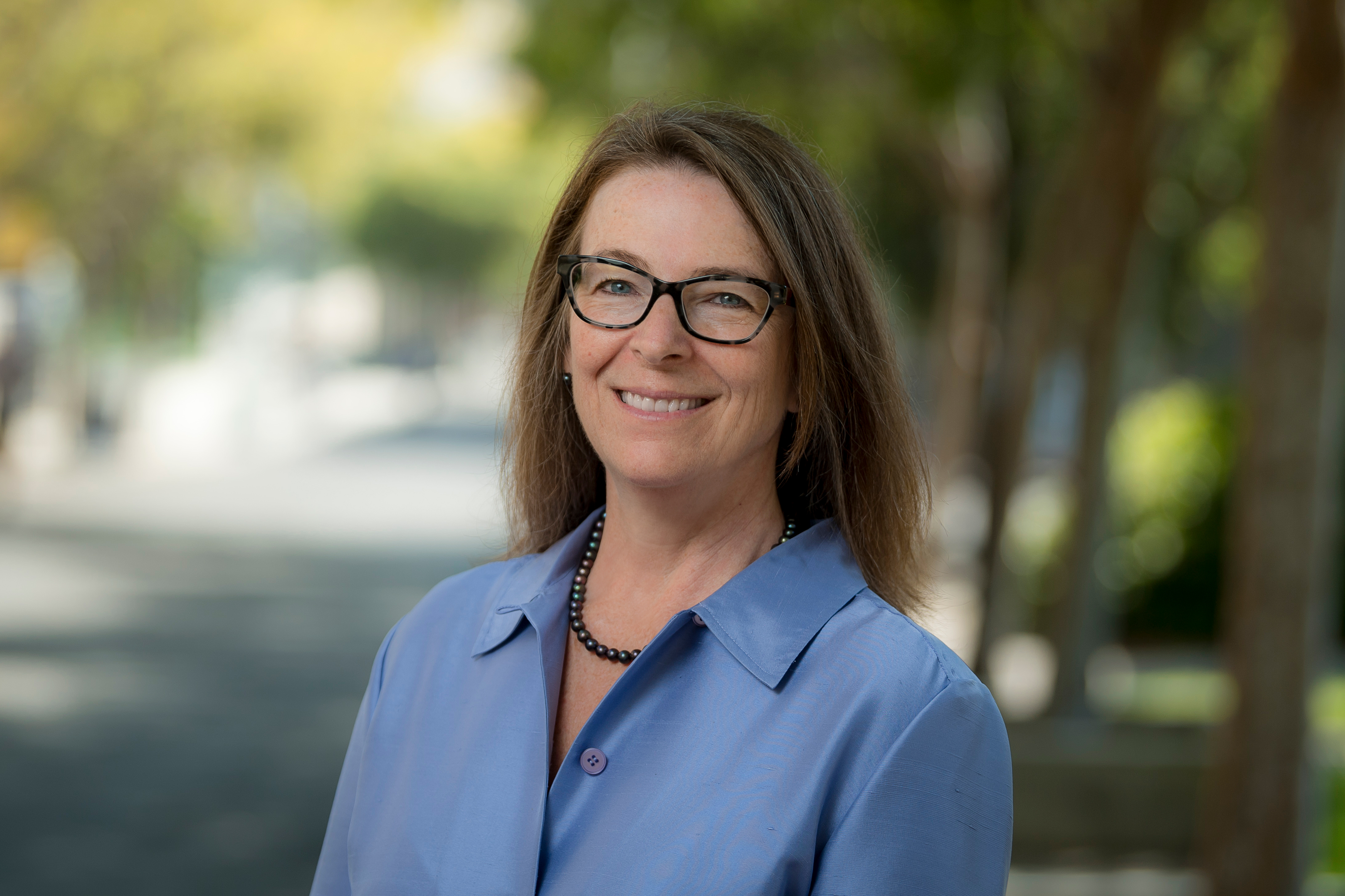
- Occupations: Vice chancellor for research and innovation (University of California, San Diego)

Academic background
- Education: University of New Mexico; University of California, Los Angeles

Academic work
- Discipline: Epidemiologist
- Institutions: University of Iowa College of Public Health; University of California, San Diego

Corinne Peek-Asa is an American epidemiologist and the vice chancellor for research and innovation at the University of California, San Diego. She was previously a distinguished professor of occupational and environmental health, as well as an associate dean for research, at the University of Iowa's College of Public Health. Her first faculty appointment was in the epidemiology department at the University of California, Los Angeles.

== Education ==
Peek-Asa earned her Bachelor's degree in biochemistry from the University of New Mexico. While working with a medical examiner, including collecting tumors for a cancer study, she learned about the field of epidemiology. Peek-Asa also worked on a study of pedestrian deaths and injuries among New Mexico's Pueblo populations, developing her interests in injury and violence prevention. She went on to earn her Master of Public Health and Doctor of Philosophy in epidemiology from the University of California, Los Angeles (UCLA).

== Career ==
Peek-Asa served as a faculty member in UCLA's epidemiology department. She joined the University of Iowa (UI)'s College of Public Health faculty in 2001, where she was a director of the CDC-funded UI Injury Prevention Research Center from 2006 to 2020. She also directed a NIH-funded trauma training program, starting in 2008. Peek-Asa became an associate dean for research in 2011, and was named a distinguished professor. She joined the University of California, San Diego (UCSD) as vice chancellor for research and innovation in 2022.

Peek-Asa was elected to the National Academy of Medicine in 2020. She co-chairs NASEM's Forum on Traumatic Brain Injury, and has been a committee member of the Transportation Research Board and Forum on Global Violence Prevention. She has served on the board of the Society for the Advancement of Violence and Injury Research, which she also helped found, as well as the National Institute for Occupational Safety and Health's Board of Scientific Counselors.

She serves on the editorial boards of two journals: Injury Epidemiology, and Adolescents.

=== Research ===
Peek-Asa has co-authored approximately 225 peer-reviewed papers and book chapters about injury and violence epidemiology. Her topics of research have included acute care, traumatic brain injury, interpersonal and workplace violence, poisoning, road traffic safety, adverse childhood experiences, suicide, and fire injury, among others. According to UI, she has influenced national legislation and helped develop injury and violence data collection systems in five countries. In her role as vice chancellor for research at UCSD, Peek-Asa co-directs the Naval Innovation, Science, and Engineering Center.
