= School of public health =

A school of public health is commonly a unit within a higher education institution. It focuses on the teaching and research in the field of public health. These schools offer various degree programs and conduct research in areas such as epidemiology, biostatistics, health policy, and environmental health.

== Africa ==
- Makerere University School of Public Health, Makerere University College of Health Sciences, Kampala, Uganda
- University of Zambia School of Public Health, Lusaka, Zambia

== Asia ==
- Hanoi School of Public Health, Hanoi, Vietnam
- All India Institute of Hygiene and Public Health, Kolkata, India.

== Europe ==
- Andalusian School of Public Health, Granada, Spain
- National School of Public Health (Spain), Carlos III Health Institute, Madrid, Spain

== North America ==
=== Canada ===
- Dalla Lana School of Public Health, University of Toronto, Toronto, Ontario

=== United States ===
- Boston University School of Public Health, Boston University, Boston, MA
- Brown University School of Public Health, Brown University, Providence, RI
- Columbia University Mailman School of Public Health, Columbia University, New York City, NY
- Colorado School of Public Health, Colorado
- CUNY Graduate School of Public Health and Health Policy, City University of New York, New York City, NY
- Drexel University School of Public Health, Drexel University, Philadelphia, PA
- Graduate School of Public Health, San Diego State University, San Diego, CA
- Harvard T.H. Chan School of Public Health, Harvard University, Boston, MA
- Wertheim School of Public Health, University of California, San Diego, San Diego, CA
- Indiana University School of Public Health-Bloomington, Indiana University Bloomington, Bloomington, IN
- Johns Hopkins Bloomberg School of Public Health, Johns Hopkins University, Baltimore, MD
- Joseph J. Zilber School of Public Health, University of Wisconsin–Milwaukee, Milwaukee, WI
- Milken Institute School of Public Health, George Washington University, Washington D.C.
- Rollins School of Public Health, Emory University, Atlanta, GA
- Rutgers School of Public Health, Rutgers University, New Jersey
- Texas A&M University School of Public Health, Texas A&M University, College Station, Texas
- Tulane University School of Public Health and Tropical Medicine, Tulane University, New Orleans, LA
- UCLA Fielding School of Public Health, University of California, Los Angeles, Los Angeles, CA
- University of California, Berkeley School of Public Health, University of California, Berkeley, Berkeley, CA
- University of Maryland School of Public Health, University of Maryland, College Park, College Park, MD
- University of Michigan School of Public Health, University of Michigan, Ann Arbor, MI
- University of Minnesota School of Public Health, University of Minnesota, Minneapolis, MN
- University of Pittsburgh Graduate School of Public Health, University of Pittsburgh, Pittsburgh, PA
- University of Washington School of Public Health, University of Washington, Seattle, WA
- UNC Gillings School of Global Public Health, University of North Carolina at Chapel Hill, Chapel Hill, NC
- UTHealth School of Public Health, University of Texas Health Science Center at Houston, Houston, TX
- West Virginia University School of Public Health, West Virginia University, Morgantown, WV
- Yale School of Public Health, Yale University, New Haven, CT
