= Ronghui Xu =

Chinese-American biostatistician

Ronghui (Lily) Xu (simplified Chinese: 徐蓉晖; traditional Chinese: 徐蓉暉; pinyin: Xú Rónghuī; born 1969) is a Chinese and American biostatistician whose research interests include random effects models, causal inference, machine learning in biomedical big data, and applications in developmental toxicity including the study of fetal alcohol spectrum disorder and the risks of medicines and vaccines in pregnancy. She is a professor at the University of California, San Diego, affiliated with the university's Wertheim School of Public Health, its Department of Mathematics, and its Halıcıoğlu Data Science Institute.

== Education and career ==
Xu's parents were engineers in Suzhou, China. As a high school student, she was not planning to study mathematics until she won a mathematics competition giving her a scholarship to Nankai University, from which she graduated in 1990. She came to the University of California, San Diego (UCSD) as a graduate student, received a master's degree in applied mathematics in 1995, and completed her Ph.D. in mathematics in 1996. Her doctoral dissertation, Inference for the Proportional Hazards Model, was supervised by John O'Quigley.

After postdoctoral research in the UCSD Cancer Center, she became an assistant professor of biostatistics at the Harvard School of Public Health and Dana–Farber Cancer Institute from 1997 until 2004. In 2004, she returned to UCSD as an associate professor, jointly appointed in the Department of Family and Preventive Medicine and the Department of Mathematics. She was promoted to full professor in 2010.

== Recognition ==
Xu was elected as a Fellow of the American Statistical Association in 2013.
