= Urology Times =

- Discipline: Urology
- Language: English
- Edited by: Gopal H. Badlani, Michael S. Cookson

Publication details
- History: 1973–present
- Publisher: MJH Life Sciences
- Frequency: Monthly

Standard abbreviations
- ISO 4: Urol. Times

Indexing
- ISSN: 0093-9722 (print); 2150-7384 (web)
- OCLC no.: 149664581

Links
- Journal homepage; Online archive

Urology Times is a monthly peer-reviewed medical journal published by MJH Life Sciences. The journal was established in 1973. Its editors-in-chief are Gopal H. Badlani (Wake Forest School of Medicine) and Michael S. Cookson (University of Oklahoma Health Sciences Center).

== Abstracting and indexing ==
The journal is abstracted and indexed in EBSCO databases, CINAHL, ProQuest databases, and Scopus.
