= Patty Freedson =

American kinesiologist

Patty Susan Freedson is an American kinesiologist and expert on actigraphy. She is a professor emerita and former chair of the kinesiology department at the University of Massachusetts Amherst School of Public Health and Health Sciences where she served on the faculty from 1981 to 2016. Freedson is the founding editor of the Journal for the Measurement of Physical Behaviour. She is a fellow of the Research Consortium, the American Academy of Kinesiology and Physical Education, and the American College of Sports Medicine. She is a fellow of the National Academy of Kinesiology.

Freedson earned a B.S. (1975), M.S. (1976), and Ph.D. (1980) from the University of Michigan. Her dissertation was titled, Steady-Rate Exercise Cardiac Output, Influence of Hemoglobin. Vic Katch was her doctoral advisor.
