= Patricia Kearney =

Irish epidemiologist

- Born: Cork, Ireland

Academic background
- Education: MD, 1998, University College Cork; MPH, PhD, Tulane University School of Public Health and Tropical Medicine; PhD, Oxford University

Academic work
- Institutions: University College Cork

Patricia Mary Kearney is an Irish epidemiologist. In May 2016, she was appointed Professor of Epidemiology at University College Cork and Europe Regional Councillor of the International Epidemiological Association. She is the Irish lead PI for TRUST, an EU funded FP7 clinical trial in subclinical hypothyroidism in healthy older adults and was named one of six Health Research Board (HRB) Research Leaders to "address strategic gaps and leadership capacity in population health and health services research in Ireland."

== Early life and education ==
Kearney was born and raised in Cork, Ireland. She completed her medical degree at University College Cork, her Master's degree from Tulane University School of Public Health and Tropical Medicine, and her PhD at Oxford University. While at Tulane, she was the recipient of the Lucent Technologies Scholarship in science and technology under the Fulbright Programme in Ireland. As a doctoral student, Kearney led a study predicting that by 2025, approximately one in three adults over age 20 will have high blood pressure.

== Career ==
Upon returning to Ireland, Kearney was awarded the 2007 Paul Beeson Fellowship to become the first recipient of the award outside of the United States of America. Following this, she was appointed as Senior Lecturer in Public Health at her alma mater, University College Cork. Kearney was also named to the Irish Longitudinal Study on Ageing (TILDA) led by Trinity College. In this role, she used data collected by TILDA to determine the prevalence of known cardiovascular risk factors in the ageing Irish population. In 2011, Kearney was selected to participate in a research project called "Thyroid Hormone Replacement for Subclinical Hypo-Thyroidism Trial" (TRUST) investigating current treatment practices for people who suffer from a mildly underactive thyroid gland. As the leader of the Irish study, her research team followed 3,000 older subjects over a five-year period in an attempt to better understand how to treat people who suffer from subclinical hypothyroidism.

As a professor at University College Cork, Kearney was named one of six Health Research Board (HRB) Research Leaders to "address strategic gaps and leadership capacity in population health and health services research in Ireland." She specifically chose to focus on improving patient care and reduce the preventable clinical, financial and societal burden of diabetes. In May 2016, she was appointed Professor of Epidemiology and Europe Regional Councillor of the International Epidemiological Association.

During the COVID-19 pandemic, Kearney was named to the Commiette on COVID-19 Response. She rejected government claims that a ‘Zero Covid’ approach to eliminate the virus was not a realistic option and encouraged lockdowns and increasing travel restrictions.

In 2022 she was elected a member of the Royal Irish Academy.
