= Alhassan =

Alhassan is a surname. Notable people with the surname include:

- Abdul Razak Alhassan (born 1985), a Ghanaian mixed-martial artist
- Masahudu Alhassan (born 1992), Ghanaian international full-back
- Alhassan Mohammed Gani (1959–2025), Nigerian academic administrator
- Alhassan Wakaso (born 1992), Ghanaian midfielder
- Kalif Alhassan (born 1990), Ghanaian winger
- Karim Alhassan (born 1991), Ghanaian defender
- Mohammed Alhassan (born 1984), Ghanaian goalkeeper
- George Alhassan (born 1955), Ghanaian forward
- George Alhassan (1941–2013), former Ghanaian football player
- Sofiya Alhassan (born 1974), American kinesiologist
