= Alexandra Minna Stern =

American historian

Alexandra Minna Stern is the Humanities Dean, and Professor of English and History, and at the Institute for Society and Genetics, at the University of California, Los Angeles.

== Academic career ==
Her research focuses on the history of eugenics, the uses and misuses of genetics, and the extremism of the far right in national and international contexts. She has also written about the history of public health, infectious diseases, and tropical medicine. Through these topics, she explores the dynamics of gender, sexuality, race, ethnicity, disability, social difference, and reproductive politics.

In 2013, Stern founded the Sterilization and Social Justice Lab (SSJL), an interdisciplinary research team studying the history of eugenic sterilization in the United States. Stern currently co-directs the SSJL with Nicole Novak, and Natalie Lira. In January 2017, Stern and co-authors Nicole Novak, Natalie Lira, Kate O'Connor, Sharon Kardia, and Siobán Harlow published an article in the American Journal of Public Health entitled, "California's Sterilization Survivors: An Estimate and Call for Redress" which estimated the likely living number of survivors of California's 20th century eugenic sterilization program. This research received extensive media coverage in The New York Times, The Atlantic, and NPR. It inspired and informed a Los Angeles Times editorial urging the State of California to seriously consider reparations for survivors of eugenic sterilization. In 2021, California passed the California Forced or Involuntary Sterilization Compensation Program, which provides compensation to survivors of eugenic sterilization laws from 1909 to 1979 and survivors of involuntary sterilizations in women's prisons after 1979. The SSJL's research helped inform this effort, and the lead author of the bill was Assemblywoman Wendy Carrillo. The bill was co-sponsored by the Back to the Basics Community Empowerment, Disability Rights Education and Defense Fund, California Latinas for Reproductive Justice (CLRJ), and California Coalition for Women Prisoners (CCWP), in collaboration with the Sterilization and Social Justice Lab and with contributions from the Belly of the Beast film team. The SSJL was the source for demographic information and contextual historical research to identify survivors from the historic era.

== Publications ==
Stern has written over 50 books and articles, and contributes to popular media stories about gender, medicine, and health in venues such as The New York Times Magazine, The Daily Beast, NPR, The Washington Post, and The Guardian.

=== Eugenic Nation ===
Stern is the author of Eugenic Nation: Faults and Frontiers of Better Breeding in Modern America (University of California Press, 2005), which won the Arthur Viseltear Award for outstanding contribution to the history of public health by the American Public Health Association. Eugenic Nation is now in its second edition (University of California Press, 2015).

=== Telling Genes ===
Stern is also the author of Telling Genes: The Story of Genetic Counseling in America (Johns Hopkins University Press, 2012), which Choice Reviews named a Choice Outstanding Academic Title.

=== Proud Boys and the White Ethnostate ===
Stern's latest book, Proud Boys and the White Ethnostate: How the Alt-Right is Warping the American Imagination (Beacon Press, 2019), applies the lenses of historical analysis, feminist studies, and critical race studies to deconstructing the core ideas of the alt-right and white nationalism.
