= Ebony Carter =

American obstetrician

- Education: Stanford University; University of Michigan; Duke University School of Medicine; Massachusetts General Hospital; Washington University School of Medicine
- Known for: Group prenatal therapy Health equity
- Awards: By and For St. Louis Award (2023)
- Scientific career
- Fields: Maternal-Fetal Medicine; Obstetrics and Gynecology; Health Disparities
- Workplaces: Washington University in St. Louis; Harvard Medical School; University of North Carolina School of Medicine

Ebony Carter is an obstetrician, reproductive health equity researcher and professor of obstetrics and gynecology at the University of North Carolina School of Medicine. Carter is the Director of the Division of Maternal-Fetal Medicine at University of North Carolina School of Medicine. As a physician-scientist, Carter is known for her research and implementation of community-based interventions to improve health equity among pregnant patients. Carter is the inaugural Associate Editor of Equity for the academic journal Obstetrics and Gynecology, published by the American College of Obstetricians and Gynecologists (ACOG).

== Early life and education ==
Carter completed an undergraduate degree in human biology at Stanford University in 2000. During her time at Stanford, Carter conducted her undergraduate thesis exploring the role of race in patient access to autologous stem cell transplant for patients with multiple myeloma. Carter's past research experiences and her mother's leadership role as executive director of the Ohio Commission on Minority Health inspired her to pursue a Master of Public Health after college.

After completing her Master of Public Health at the University of Michigan School of Public Health in 2002, Carter began medical school at Duke University School of Medicine in 2002. Upon graduating medical school in 2006, Carter pursued a residency in OB/GYN at the Brigham and Women's Hospital and the Massachusetts General Hospital integrated program. Carter completed her residency in 2010 and worked as an instructor in OB/GYN at Harvard Medical School.

In 2013, Carter left Boston to complete a fellowship in Maternal-Fetal Medicine at Washington University School of Medicine in St. Louis. Missouri.

== Career and research ==
Carter joined the Washington University School of Medicine faculty in 2016 and was promoted to tenured associate professor. While at WashU, Carter was Chief of the Division of Clinical Research and conducted health equity research about group prenatal care as a platform to address health disparities and equity in OB/GYN. Carter's research has identified that group prenatal care for women with diabetes improves postpartum contraceptive usage and postpartum oral glucose testing. Carter then obtained funding from the National Institutes of Minority Health and Health Equity to create Elevating Voices, Addressing Depression, Toxic Stress and Equity in Group Prenatal Care Women's Collaborative (EleVATE) which aims to specifically address black maternal mortality which is up to 3x higher than that of white pregnant people in the United States. The program is supported by the Integrated Health Network of St. Louis and Affinia Healthcare to provide trauma-informed care in a group setting for African American Women in St. Louis.

Carter has focused much of her career on increasing awareness of health inequities in reproductive care. She co-wrote a “Letter to birthing black people” which has been widely circulated in the OB/GYN community to raise awareness of the lived experiences of black birthing people in America and the fears they face due to their increased mortality risk. Along with her media and community level work, Carter works to improve health equity at the national level. Carter became the inaugural associate editor of equity for the journal of Obstetrics and Gynecology, where she helps the journal maintain a focus on equity and inclusion.

In 2023, Carter was recruited to University of North Carolina School of Medicine to become the Division Director of Maternal-Fetal Medicine.

=== Media features ===
Carter was featured in the St. Louis American and on STLPR discussing her experience during the COVID-19 pandemic and her focus on promoting vaccination among her patients.

She was interviewed on National Public Radio in St. Louis (STLPR) regarding the extension of medicaid to one year postpartum.

== Awards and honors ==
- 2023 - By and for St. Louis Award
- 2022 - NIH R21 Award from National Institutes of Minority Health and Health Disparities
- 2019 - Pathway to Stop Diabetes Grant
- 2017-2019 Gant ABOG Fellowship
- 2012 - The BWH Minority Faculty Career Development Award (MFGDA)
- Miles and Eleanor Shore Award

== Select publications ==
- Carter, EB; Thayer, SM; Paul, R; Barry, VG; Iqbal, SN; Ehrenberg, S; Doering, M; Mazzoni, SE; Frolova, AI; Kelly, JC; Raghuraman, N; Debbink, MP (2024). "Diabetes Group Prenatal Care: A Systematic Review and Meta-analysis". Obstet Gynecol. 144 (5): 621–632. doi:10.1097/AOG.0000000000005442. PMC 11078888. PMID 37944148..
- Carter, EB; Temming, LA; Akin, J; Fowler, S; Macones, GA; Colditz, GA; Tuuli, MG (2016). "Group Prenatal Care Compared With Traditional Prenatal Care: A Systematic Review and Meta-analysis". Obstet Gynecol. 128 (3): 551–61. doi:10.1097/AOG.0000000000001560. PMC 4993643. PMID 27500348.
- Carter, EB; Bishop, KC; Goetzinger, KR; Tuuli, MG; Cahill, AG (2015). "The impact of chorionicity on maternal pregnancy outcomes". Am J Obstet Gynecol. 213 (3): 390.e1–7. doi:10.1016/j.ajog.2015.05.027. PMID 25986034..
