= Mary Hawn =

American surgeon

- Born: September 30th Manistique, Michigan, U.S.
- Spouse: Eben Rosenthal
- Children: Sarah Rosenthal and J. Walker Rosenthal

Academic background
- Education: BSc, Biomedical Sciences, 1987, University of Michigan; MD, 1991, Michigan Medicine; MPH, 1996, University of Michigan School of Public Health

Academic work
- Institutions: Stanford University; University of Alabama at Birmingham

Mary T. Hawn is an American surgeon. She is the chair of surgery and the Emile Holman Professor in Surgery at Stanford University.

In 2021, Hawn was elected a member of the National Academy of Medicine for "being a leading surgeon, educator and health services researcher whose innovative work has built valid measurements for quality care, improved care standards and changed surgical care guidelines."

== Early life and education ==
Hawn was born and raised in Manistique, Michigan, where she became interested in medicine at an early age. She remained in her home state for her education; she completed her Bachelor of Science degree, medical degree, and MPH at University of Michigan institutions. During her undergraduate studies, Hawn earned a work-study job in a scientific research laboratory under Tadataka Yamada.

== Career ==
Following her fellowship in laparoscopic surgery at the Oregon Health & Science University, Hawn was recruited to be an assistant professor in the gastrointestinal surgery section at the University of Alabama at Birmingham (UAB). During her tenure at UAB, Hawn served as director of the Division of Gastrointestinal Surgery and named a Fellow of the Hedwig van Ameringen Executive Leadership in Academic Medicine Program.

Hawn eventually left UAB in 2015 to become the chair of the Department of Surgery at the Stanford University School of Medicine. Later that year, she was also given an Endowed Professorship of Surgery. In 2019, Hawn was appointed to the Stanford Health Care Board of Directors.

In 2021, Hawn was elected a member of the National Academy of Medicine for "being a leading surgeon, educator and health services researcher whose innovative work has built valid measurements for quality care, improved care standards and changed surgical care guidelines." She was also appointed vice-chair of the American Board of Surgery for the 2021–22 term.

== Personal life ==
Hawn and her husband Eben Rosenthal have two children together.
