= Upper Midwest Preparedness and Emergency Response Learning Center =

The Upper Midwest Preparedness and Emergency Response Learning Center
- The center's logo
- Abbreviation: UMPERLC
- Formation: 2001
- Headquarters: Iowa City, IA
- Region served: Iowa and Nebraska
- Official language: English
- Parent organization: University of Iowa College of Public Health
- Website: Official Website

The Upper Midwest Preparedness and Emergency Response Learning Center (UMPERLC), established in May 2001 as the Iowa Center for Public Health Preparedness is a public health center at the University of Iowa College of Public Health. It is one of 14 centers across the country working to inform the public health workforce of the "skills to prepare for, promptly identify, and respond to any public health emergencies." The UMPERLC covers the states of Iowa and Nebraska, but also offers the majority of its training programs online through the Prepare Iowa Learning Management System, making them accessible to anyone wanting to take the courses. As of January 1, 2015, there were over 400 courses available online and more than 38,000 users of the Prepare Iowa LMS.

== Program partners ==
The Upper Midwest Preparedness and Emergency Response Learning Center and its program partners develop, deliver, and evaluate training programs for public health and emergency providers. The Center partners with the following organizations:

- Iowa Counties Public Health Association
- Iowa Department of Public Health
- Iowa Homeland Security and Emergency Management
- Iowa Primary Care Association
- Iowa State University College of Veterinary Medicine
- Iowa State University Center for Food Security and Public Health
- University of Nebraska Medical Center for Preparedness Education
- Safeguard Iowa Partnership
- State Hygienic Laboratory at the University of Iowa
