= Neal Krause =

- Born: December 15, 1948 (age 77); Mineola, New York
- Scientific career
- Fields: Public health
- Institutions: School of Public Health, University of Michigan

Neal Krause (born 1948) is Marshall H. Becker Collegiate Professor of Public Health at University of Michigan School of Public Health, in Ann Arbor, Michigan.

== Biography & awards ==
Krause was born on December 15, 1948, in Mineola, New York. Krause obtained a baccalaureate degree from the University of Oklahoma (BBA in marketing and management, 1971), a master's degree in sociology and psychology from Sam Houston State University (MA, 1974), and a doctorate in sociology (University of Akron and Kent State University, 1978). From 1982 to 1986, Krause worked at the University of Texas Medical Branch as Research Associate, Research Instructor, and assistant professor. In 1986 he joined the Department of Health Behavior and Health Education in the University of Michigan School of Public Health as associate professor, and in 2009 he became the Marshall H. Becker Collegiate Professor of Public Health.

In 2002 Krause was identified by the Institute for Scientific Information as one of the 250 most frequently cited social scientists in the 1981-1999 ISI Social Sciences Citation Index data base.

In 2010 Krause won the Richard Kalish Innovative Publication Award for his 2008 book, "Aging in the Church: How Social Relationships Affect Health".

In 2017, the Gerontological Society of America awarded the Robert W. Kleemeier Award to Krause for his contributions to research on religion, health, and aging.
