= Richard Larson (academic) =

American operations researcher and educator (born 1943)

Richard C. Larson
- Born: Richard Charles Larson; 1943 (age 82–83); Bayside, Queens, New York City, New York, U.S.
- Education: Massachusetts Institute of Technology (BS, MS, PhD)
- Spouse: Susan Jean Wheeler (m. 1969)
- Awards: Frederick W. Lanchester Prize (1972); George E. Kimball Medal (2002); INFORMS Presidents Award (2003); Harold Larnder Prize in Operations Research (2004); Lawrence M. Klein Award (2015)
- Scientific career
- Fields: Operations research
- Workplaces: Massachusetts Institute of Technology
- Thesis: Models for the Allocation of Urban Police Patrol Forces (1969)
- Doctoral students: Kent W. Colton; Maia Majumder
- Website: MIT profile

Richard "Dick" Charles Larson (born 1943) is an American engineer and operations research specialist known for his contributions to urban service systems, disaster planning, pandemics, queueing theory, logistics, technology-enabled education, smart-energy houses, and workforce planning. He is currently professor of data, systems, and society at the Massachusetts Institute of Technology (MIT). Larson has authored, co-authored, or edited six books and over 175 scientific articles throughout his career.

== Early life and education ==
Larson was born in 1943 in Bayside, Queens, New York City, to Gilbert C. Larson. Larson moved to Sunbury, Pennsylvania, at the age of five. Six years later, he moved to North Plainfield, New Jersey. After graduating from Needham High School, Larson received his Bachelor of Science in 1965, Master of Science in 1967, and Ph.D. in 1969, all in electrical engineering from the Massachusetts Institute of Technology.

== Career ==
Larson's primary area of research is in urban systems, especially on the effectiveness and efficiency of urban emergency services. Beginning in the late 1960s under the auspices of the RAND Corporation, he studied police and other emergency services dispatch systems in New York City, resulting in a number of papers.

Larson served as president of the Operations Research Society of America (ORSA) from 1993 to 1994, and then again in 2005 after it merged with the Institute for Operations Research and the Management Sciences (INFORMS). He was named a founding fellow of INFORMS in 2002.

In 1995, became the Director of MIT's Center for Advanced Educational Services, which sought to use technology to provide educational content to a much wider audience. During his tenure, he focused on bringing technology-enabled learning to students both on and off campus, with initiatives such as the Singapore-MIT Alliance for Research and Technology. He held this role until 2003.

As "Doctor Queue", Larson is frequently cited as an expert on queuing theory and the psychology of waiting in lines. He has appeared on National Public Radio and the Washington Post, among others.

Larson was elected a member of the National Academy of Engineering in 1993 for "developing and applying operations research methodologies in public and private-sector service industries". He has served as a consultant to numerous companies and government agencies, including the U.S. Postal Service and the City of New York. He has also held leadership positions in professional organizations.

Currently, Larson serves as Professor, Post-Tenure at MIT. He also serves as the Principal Investigator of the MIT BLOSSOMS initiative, which creates and distributes video lessons covering topics in math and science to students around the world. In addition, he is the Founder and Director of Learning International Networks Coalition, a professional society for utilizing technology to deliver quality education at scale.

== Awards ==
- 1972 – Larson's book Urban Police Patrol Analysis, published in 1972, was awarded the Frederick W. Lanchester Prize by the Operations Research Society of America.
- 2002 – George E. Kimball Medal
- 2003 – INFORMS President's Award
- 2017 – Daniel Berg Lifetime Achievement Medal, International Academy of Information Technology and Quantitative Management, for "making contributions to technology innovation, service systems and strategic decision making"

== Personal life ==
Larson is known for his interest in technology-enabled education, which he became passionate about in the early 1990s after witnessing its benefits firsthand with his own three children. He and his late wife, Mary Elizabeth Murray, used to jointly give invited seminars on the MIT BLOSSOMS program in various countries throughout the world.
