= Hudson College of Public Health =

College of the University of Oklahoma

Hudson College of Public Health, University of Oklahoma Health Sciences Center
- Type: Public
- Established: 1967
- Affiliations: University of Oklahoma Health Sciences Center
- Dean: Dr. Dale W. Bratzler
- Location: Oklahoma City, Oklahoma, United States; 35°28′59.5″N 97°29′54.1″W
- Campus: Urban
- Website: publichealth.ouhsc.edu

The Hudson College of Public Health is one of the seven colleges of the University of Oklahoma Health Sciences Center--the health sciences branch of the University of Oklahoma.

Established in 1967, it is the only college of public health accredited by the Council on Education for Public Health in the state of Oklahoma. The Hudson College of Public Health was ranked number 6 in the Top 10 Colleges of Public Health nationwide by College Magazine. The College bears the name of alumni Dr. Leslie and J. Clifford Hudson for their generous donation.

== Academics ==
=== Degrees Awarded ===
The Hudson College of Public Health grants the professional degree of Master of Public Health (MPH) and the Master of Health Administration (MHA) and the graduate degree of Master of Science (MS) and Doctor of Philosophy (PhD).

Professional and degree programs offered by the four departments of the College:

- Biostatistics and Epidemiology: MPH, MS, PhD.
- Health Administration and Policy: MHA.
- Health Promotion Sciences: MPH, MS, PhD.
- Occupational and Environmental Health: MPH, MS, PhD.

== Research Centers ==
- The Center for American Indian Health Research coordinates the Strong Heart Study--the largest epidemiological study of cardiovascular disease and its risk factors among American Indians.

== See also ==
- Public Health
- University of Oklahoma Health Sciences Center
- University of Oklahoma
