= Thomas A. LaVeist =

American academic and scholar

Thomas A. LaVeist is an American public health scholar, academic administrator, and policy expert. He is the dean and Weatherhead Presidential Chair at the Celia Scott Weatherhead School of Public Health and Tropical Medicine at Tulane University in New Orleans, Louisiana. He was previously the chairman of the Department of Health Policy and Management at the George Washington University Milken Institute School of Public Health. He is founding director of the Johns Hopkins Center for Health Disparities Solutions, and served as the William C. and Nancy F. Richardson Professor in Health Policy at the Johns Hopkins Bloomberg School of Public Health. His work examines how social conditions, public policy, and institutional factors shape health outcomes and disparities in access to care. He was elected to the National Academy of Medicine in 2013.

He has published more than 150 articles in scientific journals, including JAMA, Health Affairs, American Journal of Public Health, American Journal of Sociology, and other leading health and social policy journals.

== Early life and education ==
Thomas LaVeist was born and raised in the Brownsville section of Brooklyn, New York.

He obtained his B.A. in Sociology from the University of Maryland Eastern Shore (UMES), a historically Black university, in 1984. At UMES, he was a member of the football team and Phi Beta Sigma fraternity. He received his M.A. in sociology in 1985, and his Ph.D. in medical sociology from the University of Michigan in 1988. He completed his postdoctoral fellowship in Gerontology and Public Health Policy & Administration at the University of Michigan School of Public Health in 1990. He received a certificate in 2004 from Johns Hopkins University in Leadership Foundations. LaVeist is also certified in organizational governance through the National Association of Corporate Directors.

During his time at the University of Michigan, he helped found the National Black Graduate Students Association.

== Career ==
LaVeist joined the faculty of the Johns Hopkins Bloomberg School of Public Health in 1990, where he served for 25 years. He held multiple roles, including professor of health policy and management and professor of sociology, with joint appointments in the School of Medicine. He was the founding director of the Hopkins Center for Health Disparities Solutions.

He later joined the George Washington University Milken Institute School of Public Health as professor and chair of the Department of Health Policy and Management.

LaVeist has also held visiting faculty appointments at the University of Washington, the University of Colorado School of Medicine, Meharry Medical College, and Delaware State University, as well as a visiting fellowship at Johnson C. Smith University.

In 2018, LaVeist was appointed dean of the School of Public Health and Tropical Medicine at Tulane University. His leadership has focused on institutional strategy, financial sustainability, and aligning academic programs with workforce needs. During his tenure, the school secured a major philanthropic naming gift.

== Research ==
LaVeist’s research focuses on structural and environmental determinants of health, including the role of residential context and access to resources in shaping population outcomes.

He is known for the Exploring Health Disparities in Integrated Communities (EHDIC) study, which found that disparities in health outcomes are reduced when populations live under similar social and economic conditions. |url=https://pubmed.ncbi.nlm.nih.gov/17999196/

He has also conducted research on the economic burden of health inequalities, including studies estimating their cost to the United States economy.

== Public engagement and media ==
Beyond his academic career, LaVeist has been involved in public education, media, and initiatives addressing health disparities and educational opportunity. He collaborated with the Tom Joyner Foundation on books designed to help African American families navigate college preparation and financing, including Tom Joyner Presents How to Prepare for College, coauthored with his brother Wil LaVeist.<ref>{{cite web |title=Tom Joyner Foundation to Share Proceeds of Book Sales with UMES |url=https://wwwcp.umes.edu/pr/tom-joyner-foundation-to-share-proceeds-of-book-sales-with-umes/ |publisher=University of Maryland Eastern Shore |access-date=2026-10-30}}</ref>

In 2021, LaVeist authored a New York Times opinion piece urging Black Americans to receive COVID-19 vaccinations, along with [[American Public Health Association]] Executive Director [[Georges C. Benjamin]]. The article was endorsed by 59 other Black members of the [[National Academy of Medicine]].<ref>{{cite web |title=Dean LaVeist, Black health experts call for Black Americans to get vaccinated against COVID-19 |url=https://sph.tulane.edu/dean-laveist-black-health-experts-call-black-americans-get-vaccinated-against-covid-19 |publisher=Tulane University |access-date=2026-10-30}}</ref><ref>{{cite news |url=https://www.nytimes.com/2021/02/07/opinion/covid-black-americans.html |work=The New York Times |date=2021-02-07 |access-date=2026-10-30}}</ref>

LaVeist is also the creator and executive producer of The Skin You're In, a documentary examining racial disparities in health outcomes in the United States. The film has been featured at the Montreal International Black Film Festival and the New Orleans Black Film Festival, and received the Best Documentary award at the Black Doctor Film Festival.<ref>{{cite web |title=Best Documentary Winner: The Skin You're In |url=https://www.facebook.com/share/p/1EJb7PmTtZ/ |publisher=BlackDoctor.org |via=Facebook |access-date=2026-10-30}}</ref> He subsequently expanded the project to include The Skin You're In, a podcast exploring the social, cultural, and policy factors influencing health.<ref>{{cite web |title=The Skin You're In Podcast |url=https://podcasts.apple.com/in/podcast/the-skin-youre-in/id1689476359 |website=Apple Podcasts |access-date=2026-10-30}}</ref>

== Professional service ==
LaVeist has served in national leadership roles in public health and higher education. He served as chair of the board of directors of the Association of Schools and Programs of Public Health.

He has also served on advisory boards including the New Orleans Jazz Orchestra.

== Honors and awards ==
LaVeist was elected to the National Academy of Medicine in 2013. His honors include the Innovation Award from the National Institutes of Health.

== Works ==
- 2000, The DayStar Guide to Colleges for African American Students. Simon & Schuster/Stanly Kaplan Publishing.
- 2003, Eight Steps to Help Black Families Pay for College. Princeton Review
- 2005, Minority Populations and Health: An Introduction to Health Disparities in the United States. Jossey-Bass.
- 2012, Race, Ethnicity and Health: A Public Health Reader. Jossey-Bass
- 2017, Legacy of the Crossing: Life, death and triumph among descendants of the world's greatest forced migration. Diasporic Africa Press
- 2025, Advancing Health Equity for All: On the Front Lines of Justice in New Orleans. Oxford University Press.

== Personal ==
LaVeist is also an active jazz musician.
