= Maia Majumder =

American epidemiologist

- Born: Maimuna Shahnaz Majumder
- Education: Tufts University (BS, MPH) Massachusetts Institute of Technology (MS, PhD)
- Known for: Forecasting outbreaks, computational epidemiology
- Scientific career
- Fields: Epidemiology
- Workplaces: Harvard Medical School; Boston Children's Hospital
- Thesis: Modeling transmission heterogeneity for infectious disease outbreaks (2018)
- Doctoral advisor: Richard Larson
- Website: maimunamajumder.com

Maimuna (Maia) Majumder is a computational epidemiologist and a faculty member at Harvard Medical School and Boston Children's Hospital's Computational Health Informatics Program (CHIP).

== Education and early career ==
Majumder received her Bachelor of Science degree from Tufts University in engineering in 2013, as well as her Master of Public Health from Tufts University School of Medicine. She then attended Massachusetts Institute of Technology for both her Master of Science and Doctor of Philosophy degrees in systems engineering under the supervision of Richard Larson. For her Master's thesis work, she utilized publicly available data to model and characterize the MERS epidemic in Saudi Arabia. Her Ph.D. thesis focused on modeling disease transmission dynamics during real-world outbreaks, taking into account that there is heterogeneity within populations, so some individuals are more likely than others to transmit an infection.

While at Massachusetts Institute of Technology, Majumder joined HealthMap, a team of researchers, epidemiologists, and software developers at Boston Children's Hospital that utilizes freely available electronic data to perform real-time disease outbreak monitoring and surveillance. There, she used local news reports to track epidemics such as measles and mumps and modeling the effects of vaccination rates on their spread, using a combination of mathematical modeling and surveillance data. In 2015, she published a report that found that linked the ongoing measles outbreak in Anaheim, California, which started some time in December 2014, to a lack of vaccination. She reported that the vaccination rate was somewhere between 50 and 86 percent—well below the ideal rate of 96 percent needed to confer herd immunity to the population. In 2016, she used reporting by the Arkansas Democrat-Gazette to track the August 2016 mumps outbreak in Arkansas. She and her colleagues estimated that the vaccination rate of the MMR vaccine may have been as low as 70 percent.

With HealthMap, Majumder also monitored and published projections of Ebola virus disease infections and fatalities during the 2014 Western African Ebola virus epidemic. Her team also worked to estimate the growth and longevity of the outbreak, in addition to modeling how interventions might alter transmission rates.

Following her graduate work, Majumder joined Harvard University's Health Policy Data Science lab as a postdoctoral fellow between 2018 and 2019.

== Research ==
In 2019, Majumder was appointed a faculty member at Harvard Medical School and Boston Children's Hospital's Computational Health Informatics Program (CHIP). She rose to prominence as a public health researcher for her use of novel ways of finding, using, and visualizing non-traditional sources of public health data, including utilizing local media reports to track disease outbreaks. As someone who relies on local news for disease forecasting, Majumder has been publicly dismayed at the shuttering of local news organizations around the United States, as she relies on their reporting for her work.

Since early 2020, Majumder's research group has worked to model and forecast the spread of the COVID-19 pandemic. She produced one of the early estimates of the number of new infections caused by each infected person, if no measures were taken to control the spread of the disease; this value is known as the basic reproduction number, or R0. The analysis utilized publicly available data from cases of the infection in Wuhan, China between December 1, 2019 and January 26, 2020 and estimated the R0 is somewhere between 2.0 and 3.1, making COVID-19 more contagious that the seasonal flu. She has also stressed the need for more clarity around COVID-19 statistics, with a focus on reports around the case fatality rate of the disease, which can be misleading. She notes that in order to get an accurate view of COVID-19's fatality, we must first know how many people have actually been infected—a number that is unclear due to limited COVID-19 testing and the need to survey populations for who may have antibodies for the virus, but only experienced a mild infection.

Majumder is also an advocate for the importance of preprints, or pre-peer-reviewed publications, in quickly disseminating information and shaping the global discourse during public health crises.

== Public outreach ==
Majumder regularly shares information about epidemiology and outbreak tracking on Twitter and has written for popular outlets, such as NPR and FiveThirtyEight. She also co-edited the 2016 book Ebola's Message: Public Health and Medicine in the Twenty-First Century with philosopher Nicholas G. Evans and molecular epidemiologist Tara C. Smith about the 2013-2015 Ebola virus disease epidemic.
