= Cheryl Anderson =

American epidemiologist

Cheryl Ann Marie Anderson
- Education: Brown University (BA); University of North Carolina at Chapel Hill (MPH); University of Washington (MS, PhD)
- Scientific career
- Workplaces: University of California, San Diego

Cheryl Ann Marie Anderson is an American epidemiologist, currently serving as the inaugural dean of the Wertheim School of Public Health at the University of California, San Diego since June 2020. Her fields of research are in nutrition and chronic disease prevention in under-served human populations.

== Education ==
Anderson completed a bachelor of arts with honors in health and society from Brown University in 1992. She earned a master of public health in 1994 from University of North Carolina at Chapel Hill. In 1997, Anderson completed a master of science in the department of epidemiology at University of Washington. Her master's thesis was titled Dietary factors in Parkinson's disease: the role of food groups and specific foods. She obtained a doctor of philosophy from the University of Washington department of epidemiology interdisciplinary program in nutritional sciences in 2001. Her dissertation was titled The response of blood folate levels to folic acid supplementation: results from a crossover trial. Anderson completed a postdoctoral fellowship at University of Washington in 2002.

== Career ==
Anderson was an affiliate member in the Cancer Prevention Research Program at Fred Hutchinson Cancer Research Center from 2001 to 2002. She was an instructor of epidemiology from 2002 to 2005 in the department of biostatistics and epidemiology at University of Pennsylvania Center for Clinical Epidemiology and Biostatistics. Anderson was an assistant scientist from 2005 to 2007 in the department of epidemiology at Johns Hopkins Bloomberg School of Public Health. She was core faculty at the Welch Center for Prevention, Epidemiology, and Clinical Research from 2006 to 2012 at Johns Hopkins Medical Institutions. She served a joint appointment as an assistant professor in the division of general medicine at Johns Hopkins School of Medicine and the departments of epidemiology and international health (human nutrition) in Bloomberg School of Public Health. She was the director of the bachelor of science in the public health program at University of California, San Diego from 2012 to 2014. In 2015, she became the co-director of the University of California San Diego Center of Excellence in Health Promotion and Health Equity. She became an associate professor in 2012 in the department of family medicine and public health at UC San Diego School of Medicine.

In 2019, Anderson founded The Herbert Wertheim School of Public Health and Human Longevity Science at UC San Diego with the goal of furthering research and education focused on preventing disease, prolonging life, and promoting health through organized community efforts.

== Research ==
Anderson's research focus is in epidemiology, specifically working on the understanding of nutrition and prevention of chronic disease in under-served populations. Her work uses observational epidemiological studies, randomized clinical trials and implementation science. She is involved in several research projects including the California Teachers Study and the RESOLVE to save 100 million lives D&I initiative. Additionally she will be beginning a clinical trial to determine how dietary sodium is used in the body in September 2020.

Anderson's work delves into the effects of dietary patterns, sodium, and potassium intake on blood pressure and cardiovascular diseases, behavioral interventions for adherence to dietary recommendations, and identification of nutritional risk factors and for progression of kidney disease and development of cardiovascular events in individuals with chronic kidney disease.

== Awards and honors ==
- Fellow of the American Heart Association.
- Elected to membership in the National Academy of Medicine in 2016.
- Principal Investigator on The US Ten Day Seminar on the Epidemiology and Prevention of Cardiovascular Disease since 2017.

== Selected publications ==
- Pacheco, LS; Lacey, JV Jr; Martinez, ME; Lemus, H; Araneta, MRG; Sears, DD; Talavera, GA; Anderson, CAM (2020). "Sugar-Sweetened Beverage Intake and Cardiovascular Disease Risk in the California Teachers Study". J Am Heart Assoc. 9 (10) e014883. doi:10.1161/JAHA.119.014883. PMC 7660873. PMID 32397792..
- Anderson, CAM (2018). "Dietary Patterns to Reduce Weight and Optimize Cardiovascular Health: Persuasive Evidence for Promoting Multiple, Healthful Approaches". Circulation. 137 (11): 1114–1116. doi:10.1161/CIRCULATIONAHA.117.031429. PMID 29483087..
- Ix, JH; Anderson, CAM (2018). "Measurements of 24-Hour Urinary Sodium and Potassium Excretion: Importance and Implications". JAMA. 319 (12): 1201–1202. doi:10.1001/jama.2018.1153. PMID 29516102..
- Juraschek, SP; Miller, ER 3rd; Chang, AR; Anderson, CAM; Hall, JE; Appel, LJ (2020). "Effects of Sodium Reduction on Energy, Metabolism, Weight, Thirst, and Urine Volume: Results From the DASH (Dietary Approaches to Stop Hypertension)-Sodium Trial". Hypertension. 75 (3): 723–729. doi:10.1161/HYPERTENSIONAHA.119.13932. PMC 7278848. PMID 31957521..
- Rebholz, CM; Grams, ME; Steffen, LM; Crews, DC; Anderson, CAM; Bazzano, LA; Coresh, J; Appel, LJ (2017). "Diet Soda Consumption and Risk of Incident End Stage Renal Disease". Clin J Am Soc Nephrol. 12 (1): 79–86. doi:10.2215/CJN.03390316. PMC 5220651. PMID 27797893..
- Elijovich, F; Weinberger, MH; Anderson, CA; Appel, LJ; Bursztyn, M; Cook, NR; Dart, RA; Newton-Cheh, CH; Sacks, FM; Laffer, CL (2016). "Salt Sensitivity of Blood Pressure: A Scientific Statement From the American Heart Association". Hypertension. 68 (3): e7–e46. doi:10.1161/HYP.0000000000000047. PMID 27443572.
