= Strong Heart Study =

Native American cardiovascular disease study

- Study type: Observational Cohort
- Dates: 1984-current
- Locations: Arizona, North and South Dakota, Oklahoma
- Funding: National Heart, Lung, and Blood Institute

The Strong Heart Study is an ongoing cohort study of cardiovascular disease (CVD) and its risk factors among American Indian men and women. The original cohort began in 1984 with 4,549 participants ages 35–74 from 13 tribal nations and communities in Arizona, Oklahoma, North Dakota, and South Dakota. The need for specific ethnic and cultural understanding and sensitivities was recognized from the onset, so the study has a community-based participatory research (CBPR) model. Community members were involved in all stages of conception, design, and implementation of the research. Now in its seventh phase, the extensive research has led to many important findings about heart disease and unique risk factors in native populations. It is a project funded by the National Heart, Lung, and Blood Institute (NHLBI). The study maintains field centers in Oklahoma, North and South Dakota, and Arizona and a coordinating center at the University of Oklahoma Health Sciences Center.

== History ==
Prior to 1980, Indian Health Service (IHS) data showed low mortality rates from CVD. After 1980, CVD became the leading cause of death in American Indians. However, the Secretary of Health and Human Service's Task Force on Black and Minority Health determined that information on cardiovascular disease in American Indians was inadequate. The Strong Heart Study was designed to respond to the recommendation. Initial research began in 1984 and the first research manuscript was published in 1990.

== Phases ==
=== Phase I ===
Phase I of the study was conducted among adult tribal members from 1984 to 1988 and consisted of three parts: a mortality survey to estimate cardiovascular disease mortality rates, a morbidity survey to estimate incidence of myocardial infarction and stroke, and a comprehensive clinical examination of 4,549 tribal members to estimate the prevalence of cardiovascular disease and its associations with risk factors. Data was collected from a physical examination, electrocardiogram, blood analysis, and urine analysis. DNA was isolated and stored for future genetic studies.

=== Phase II ===
Phase II continued the mortality and morbidity surveillance into 1988 to 1994 but added comparative analysis among the three centers. It repeated and expanded the clinical examination from Phase I, in order to monitor changes in risk factor prevalence over time and expand incidence rates beyond CVD to include hypertension and diabetes.

=== Phase III and Family Study ===
In 1997, Phase III launched the Strong Heart Family Study (SHFS) with 900 first-degree relatives and grandchildren of members of the original cohort. The SHFS participants provided clinical examinations matching earlier phases, as well as DNA samples for genome-wide linkage analysis of cardiovascular disease biomarkers. A sub-sample of Phase III participants were selected to establish accurate asthma prevalence in SHS populations, which Phase II may have underdiagnosed.

=== Phase IV-VI ===
Phase IV expanded the SHFS, bringing the total number of participants to 3,776 and continuing the ongoing morbidity and mortality surveillance of the original cohort. At the end of Phase V, a community withdrew their consent to participate, reducing the total number of tribal nations represented in Phase VI from 13 to 12. Phase V and VI continued the mortality and morbidity surveillance of the original SHS cohort and of the SHFS participants to better understand cardiovascular disease, cancer, liver disease, and inflammation.

== Community-based participatory research ==
The Strong Heart Study was the first research funded by the NHLBI focusing on specific ethnic groups in rural communities. The 13 American Indian communities were involved in partnership with investigators in all aspects of the study design to ensure the recruitment of participants and conduct of examinations was culturally appropriate and relevant. Community members were part of the steering committee and helped select appropriate locations for examination sites. Community members were the major drivers of participation recruitment. Questionnaires were pilot tested and community members were employed in clinics in a variety of roles. Data and major findings were continually presented and discussed with communities and aided them in community health planning.

== Study design ==
The study is a longitudinal observational study. In its initial stages, it included three components: The first was a community mortality study to determine CVD mortality rates from 1984 to 1994 among tribal members aged 35–74 years of age residing in the three study areas. The second was the clinical examination of 4,549 eligible tribal members. The third component was the morbidity and mortality surveillance of the participants. Due to the importance of genetics in the occurrence of CVD, the SHS expanded genetic research in later phases. Phase III launched a pilot study which recruited approximately 30 families consisting of more than 900 family members. The pilot SHFS expanded into a fullblown SHFS conducted in Phase IV to investigate the heritability of CVD and its risk factors and perform linkage analysis to localize genes that contribute to CVD risk.

== Major findings ==
The study found the incidence of CVD to be increasing among American Indians. The study confirmed that similar to the general population, the key risk factors for heart disease are type 2 diabetes, high blood pressure, high cholesterol, and smoking. The research shows that for American Indian populations, type 2 diabetes was the strongest risk factor for heart disease. In young adults, diabetes and prediabetes was found to be independently associated with early adverse effects of heart structure and function.

The study also examined environmental exposure to toxic metals and CVD. It found that arsenic and cadmium exposures are prospectively associated with higher cardiovascular risk.

== Risk calculators ==
Findings from the SHS have led to risk calculators for American Indians to estimate personal risk of developing coronary heart disease, hypertension, and diabetes.
