= Sofiya Alhassan =

American kinesiologist

- Born: July 6, 1974
- Education: Stetson University (1996); Auburn University (2000, 2004)
- Scientific career
- Workplaces: University of Massachusetts Amherst School of Public Health and Health Sciences
- Thesis: The Independent and Combined Effects of Dietary Plant Stanol Ester Margarine Supplementation and Aerobic Exercise Training on Markers of Blood Lipid Metabolism in Middle-Aged Men and Women (2004)
- Doctoral advisor: Peter W. Grandjean
- Website: https://www.umass.edu/public-health-sciences/about/directory/sofiya-alhassan

Sofiya Alhassan (born July 6, 1974) is a Ghanaian-American kinesiologist and academic administrator who researches community family-based physical activity interventions. She also studies how environmental factors play a role in the behavioral health of children of color.

== Early life and education ==
Alhassan was born July 6, 1974 to Fawzia and Abdul Alhassan in Accra, Ghana. She graduated from Springbrook High School in 1992. She earned a B.S. in psychology and exercise science from Stetson University in 1996. Alhassan received a M.S. (2000) and Ph.D. in exercise physiology (2004) from Auburn University. Her dissertation was titled, The Independent and Combined Effects of Dietary Plant Stanol Ester Margarine Supplementation and Aerobic Exercise Training on Markers of Blood Lipid Metabolism in Middle-Aged Men and Women. Peter W. Grandjean was Alhassan's doctoral advisor. She was a postdoctoral fellow at Stanford University School of Medicine.

== Career ==
She has worked as a professor since 2007 and graduate program director of the kinesiology department at the University of Massachusetts Amherst School of Public Health and Health Sciences since 2015. In 2023, she became the associate dean for inclusion and engagement of the graduate school. Alhassan was elected a fellow of the National Academy of Kinesiology in 2023. She is an editor of the Journal of Physical Activity and Health.

Alhassan remains a board member of several American College of Sports Medicine committees.

Alhassan is currently researching ways to prevent pediatric obesity using physical activity, including interventions to avoid early onset cardiovascular disease risk factors in minority groups, like community family-based physical activity interventions.
