= Jiann-Ping Hsu College of Public Health =

Public health college of Georgia Southern University

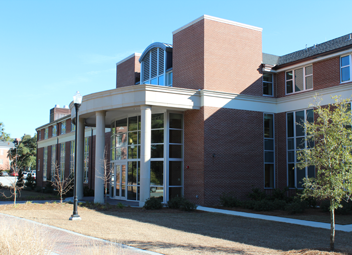
- Established: 2006
- Dean: Stuart Tedders
- Location: Savannah & Statesboro, Georgia, USA
- Campus: Statesboro Campus Armstrong Campus
- Website: Jiann-Ping Hsu College of Public Health

The Jiann-Ping Hsu College of Public Health is one of eleven colleges of Georgia Southern University. The college maintains offices on the university's Statesboro Campus and Armstrong Campus in Savannah, Georgia.

== History ==
On January 14, 2004, the Board of Regents established the first School of Public Health in the University System of Georgia and named it the Jiann-Ping Hsu School of Public Health. The school was established with support from a private donation by Karl E. Peace in memory and honor of his wife, Jiann-Ping Hsu.

To position the school for accreditation by the Council on Education for Public Health (CEPH), it was redesignated the Jiann-Ping Hsu College of Public Health, effective January 1, 2006. The mission of the Jiann-Ping Hsu College of Public Health is to improve health and eliminate health disparities and health inequities in rural communities and for underserved populations globally through excellence in teaching, public health workforce development, research, scholarship, professional service and community engagement.

From January 2006 to June 2011, Charles J. Hardy served as the founding dean of the Jiann-Ping Hsu College of Public Health and professor of community health. Under the leadership of Hardy and Carolyn Woodhouse, associate dean, the college pursued accreditation by CEPH and was accepted as an applicant for accreditation in 2008.

On January 11, 2014, the college celebrated its 10th anniversary.

In a press release on April 17, 2020, Georgia Southern University announced the appointment of Stuart Tedders as dean of the college. Tedders, a professor of epidemiology and a native of Perry, Georgia, began working at Georgia Southern in 2000. A founding member of the Jiann-Ping Hsu College of Public Health, he became associate dean for academic affairs in 2012 and later served as interim dean before his appointment as dean. “I am delighted to be selected as the next dean of the Jiann-Ping Hsu College of Public Health,” Tedders said in the press release. “Having spent much of my career at Georgia Southern University, I am proud to continue serving an institution with such strong traditions of excellence and a vision to serve rural and underserved communities.”

== Accreditation ==
The Jiann-Ping Hsu College of Public Health received its initial CEPH accreditation in June 2011. In December 2024, CEPH continued the college's accreditation through December 31, 2031. The college's Master of Health Administration (MHA) program is separately accredited by the Commission on Accreditation of Healthcare Management Education (CAHME).

== Academic programs ==
The Jiann-Ping Hsu College of Public Health offers undergraduate and graduate programs in public health and health administration, as well as a graduate certificate. The faculty of the college is devoted to excellence in teaching, research, public health practice, and service. Students gain valuable insight, experience, and skills that contribute to their success in public health, health administration, and related fields.

Bachelor of Science in Public Health (BSPH) – optional embedded certificates:

- Addiction Recovery
- Data Science
- Environmental Health
- Emergency Preparedness
- Health Equity
- Maternal and Child Health
- Public Health Informatics

Master of Public Health (MPH) – concentrations:

- Applied Public Health (online)
- Biostatistics
- Community Health (hybrid)
- Environmental Health Sciences
- Epidemiology
- Public Health Informatics (online)
- Health Policy and Management

Master of Health Administration (MHA)

Doctor of Public Health (DrPH) – concentrations:

- Biostatistics
- Community Health Behavior and Education (hybrid)
- Epidemiology
- Health Policy and Management
- Public Health Leadership (online)

Graduate Certificate in Public Health (online)

== Centers ==
The Jiann-Ping Hsu College of Public Health houses three centers:

- The Karl E. Peace Center for Biostatistics and Research provides biostatistical and research consulting services to Georgia Southern University and external researchers. Its work includes study design, data management, statistical analysis, and training related to public health, clinical, and translational research.
- The Center for Rural and Public Health Practice and Research works to improve the health of rural and underserved communities through technical assistance, education, public health research, and program and process evaluation.
- The Center for Addiction Recovery supports students in recovery while advancing research and education related to substance use, addiction, and recovery. The center also engages in community outreach and houses True Blue Recovery, Georgia Southern University's collegiate recovery program.
