= University of Maryland School of Public Health =

School of public health at the University of Maryland College Park

School of Public Health
- Established: 2007
- Parent institution: University of Maryland, College Park
- Location: College Park, Maryland, USA
- Website: sph.umd.edu

The School of Public Health is the public health school of the University of Maryland, College Park.

It has been fully accredited by the Council on Education for Public Health since 2016.

Boris Lushniak, who served as acting Surgeon General of the United States from July 17, 2013 to December 15, 2014, is dean of the school.
