= Sharon Kardia =

American epidemiologist

Academic background
- Education: BS, Biological Sciences, 1985, Carnegie Mellon University; MA, Statistics, 1990, PhD, Human Genetics, 1991, University of Michigan
- Thesis: Systems Analysis of the Hormonal Control of Renal Hemodynamics and Sodium Excretion (1991)

Academic work
- Institutions: University of Michigan School of Public Health

Sharon Lee Reilly Kardia is an American epidemiologist. She is the Millicent W. Higgins Collegiate Professor of Epidemiology and Associate Dean for Education at the University of Michigan School of Public Health. Her research interests involve genetic epidemiology of common chronic diseases.

== Early life and education ==
Kardia earned her Bachelor of Science degree from Carnegie Mellon University and her graduate degrees from the University of Michigan.

== Career ==
Kardia accepted a faculty position at the University of Michigan School of Public Health (UMich) in 1998. Within her first year teaching at the institution, Kardia led a study examining why risk factors for atherosclerosis varied from person to person. Her research team discovered that the Apolipoprotein E protein determined how much influence cholesterol and other risk factors had on atherosclerosis. She later worked alongside Toby Citrin in 2001 to propose, develop, and lead UMich's first Center for Public Health and Community Genomics through a cooperative agreement between the Centers for Disease Control and Prevention and the Association of Schools of Public Health. While serving in this role, Kardia led a nationwide study of 6,250 people to conclude that there was no single genetic cause of hypertension. Citrin and Kardia were also both appointed co-directors of the Life Sciences, Values and Society Program in 2004, where they said they would "expand the cross-campus initiative exploring the ethical and societal questions raised by advances in science." As a result of her genetics research, Kardia was named to the nonprofit Genetic Alliance Council.

In 2017, Kardia was appointed the Millicent W. Higgins Collegiate Professor of Epidemiology. She was later named the University of Michigan's School of Public Health’s inaugural Associate Dean for Education During the COVID-19 pandemic in North America, Kardia co-led a project to develop an online COVID-19 symptom checklist and COVID-19 dashboard to give Michigan health officials easy access to high risk areas for new coronavirus cases and to assist in educating the public.
