= Tulane University School of Public Health and Tropical Medicine =

Private institute in New Orleans, Louisiana, US

Coordinates: 29.95722°N 90.07529°W

Celia Scott Weatherhead School of Public Health and Tropical Medicine
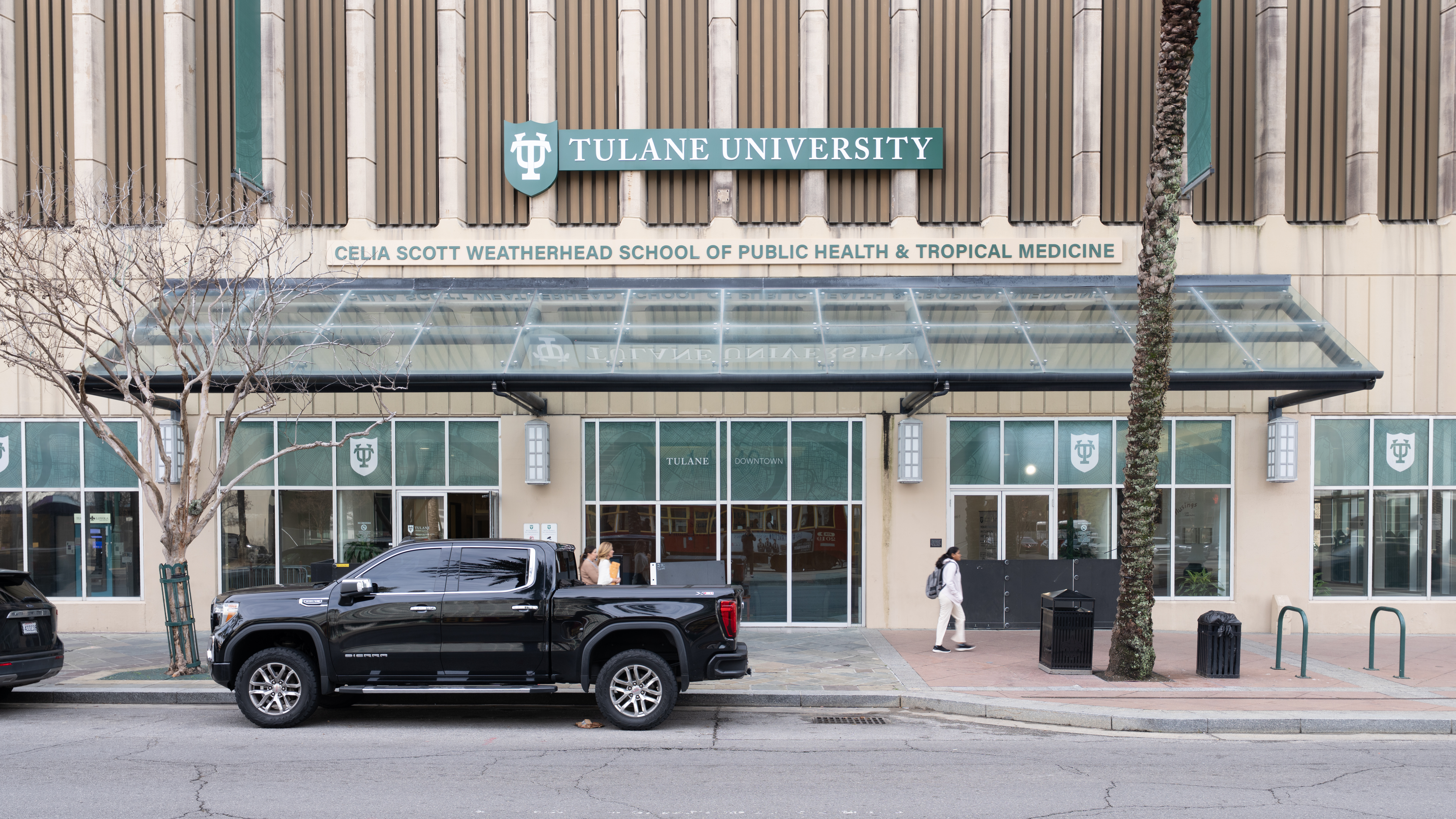
- Motto: Arrive with passion. Leave with purpose.
- Type: Private
- Established: 1912; 114 years ago
- Dean: Thomas LaVeist, PhD, Weatherhead Presidential Chair in Health Equity
- Location: New Orleans, Louisiana, US
- Website: sph.tulane.edu

The Tulane University School of Public Health and Tropical Medicine (officially Celia Scott Weatherhead School of Public Health and Tropical Medicine) is the public health school of Tulane University, a private university in New Orleans, Louisiana.

== History ==
The study of public health in Louisiana began in the early 19th century, when New Orleans suffered from endemic malaria and almost yearly epidemics of cholera and yellow fever. Attempts to control tropical diseases led to the establishment of the Medical College of Louisiana in 1834, founded by a group of young practicing physicians. The founders issued a prospectus that emphasized the lack of knowledge of these diseases and the necessity to study them in the environment in which they occurred. In 1881, formal instruction in hygiene was offered for the first time.

Samuel Zemurray provided financial support for the founding of the country's first School of Hygiene and Tropical Medicine at Tulane in 1912. Known as "Sam the Banana Man," Zemurray backed the institution in part given his own business interests in the banana industry in Honduras, which were at the time greatly affected by diseases like yellow fever. His banana schemes also prompted him to organize and support a military coup at around the same time against Honduran President Miguel R. Dávila in order to restore Manuel Bonilla to power, since Bonilla offered favorable tax breaks and railway concessions for Zemurray's business interests. As part of his work in Honduras, Zemurray contracted with United Fruit Company, which was also one of the first financial backers of the School of Hygiene and Tropical Medicine.

The school's launch in 1912 was significant, and as it was part of the movement to establish similar institutions around the world. It was hailed by academicians nationally and internationally as the first such school in the United States, where tropical diseases had had devastating effects, particularly in the South. The first Doctor of Public Health degree was conferred in 1914, well before the founding of any other school of public health.

Later, in 1919, the School of Hygiene and Tropical Medicine merged back into the College of Medicine. The departments of tropical medicine and preventive medicine then merged to establish the department of tropical medicine and public health. Tulane joined the Council on Education of Public Health in 1947. With public health and tropical medicine rapidly expanding, an administrative division of graduate public health was created in 1958, and was re-designated as the Division of Hygiene and Tropical Medicine in 1961. In 1967, the Hygiene and Tropical Medicine interests reverted to being its own entity of Tulane University and became today's iteration of the School of Public Health and Tropical Medicine.

On September 18, 2024, the school was renamed the "Celia Scott Weatherhead School of Public Health and Tropical Medicine" after philanthropist and Tulane alum, Celia Scott Weatherhead, in recognition of her landmark total lifetime giving of more than $160 million in support of the university.

== Departments ==
The Celia Scott Weatherhead School of Public Health and Tropical Medicine has seven academic departments:

- Biostatistics and Data Science
- Environmental Health Sciences
- Epidemiology
- Health Policy and Management
- International Health and Sustainable Development
- Social, Behavioral, and Population Sciences
- Tropical Medicine

== Centers, institutes, and training grants ==
- Center for Applied Environmental Public Health]
- Center for Applied Malaria Research and Evaluation]
- Center for Bioinformatics and Genomics]
- Center for Emerging Reproductive Perinatal Epidemiology
- Center for Global Health Equity]
- Center for Gulf Coast Environmental Health Research, Leadership and Strategic Initiative
- Center for Studies of Displaced Populations
- Health Office for Latin America
- Health Systems Analytics Research Center
- Mary Amelia Douglas-Whited Women's Health Education Center
- MEASURE Evaluation Project Phase IV
- Tulane Center for Lifespan Epidemiology Research
- Tulane Global Research Data Center
- Tulane Hypertension and Renal Center of Excellence
- Tulane Obesity Research Center
- Tulane Office for Global Health
- Tulane Prevention Research Center
- Tulane University Office of Health Research
- Tulane Translational Science Institute

=== Training Grants ===
- Building Interdisciplinary Research Centers in Women's Health
- Center of Excellence in Maternal and Child Health
- HRSA MCH Epidemiology Doctoral Training Program
- Inter-American Training for Innovations in Emerging Infectious Diseases
- Region 6 South Central Public Health Training Center
- Tulane-Xavier Minority Health International Research in Training

== Reputation ==
The mission of Celia Scott Weatherhead School of Public Health and Tropical Medicine is to advance global public health and decrease health disparities through excellence in education, research, and collaborative partnerships

The students, faculty, and staff represent more than 70 cultures from around the world.

Students enroll from more than 40 different countries, and the school remains in the top tier of accredited schools of public health across the country. U.S. News & World Report's 2025 edition ranked the School of Public Health and Tropical Medicine 10th among public health programs. In 2008, the school conferred the first bachelor of science in public health degrees to the first undergraduate class of Tulane public health graduates. Tulane University School of Public Health and Tropical Medicine celebrated its 100th anniversary in 2012.

The school also has a joint degree program with Tulane's School of Medicine, offering the MD/MPH degree. It is the oldest such program in the country, as well as the largest.

== Degrees conferred ==
- Master of Public Health (MPH)
- Master of Science in Public Health (MSPH)
- Master of Health Administration (MHA)
- Master of Public Health and Tropical Medicine (MPH&TM)
- Master of Science (MS)
- Doctor of Public Health (DrPH)
- Doctor of Philosophy (PhD)
- Bachelor of Science in Public Health (BSPH)

== Deans ==
- Creighton Wellman, 1912-1914
- Isadore Dyer, MD (1914-1915)
- William Seeman, MD (1915-1918)
- Grace Goldsmith (1967-1973)
- Joseph D. Beasly (1973-1974)
- John Walsh (acting dean, 1974)
- Frank Moore (acting dean, 1975)
- James Banta, MD (1975-1987)
- Thomas Hamrick (acting dean, 1987-1991)
- Harrison Spencer (1991-1995)
- Ann Anderson (acting dean, 1995, 1999)
- Paul K. Whelton, MD, MSc (1997-1998)
- Pierre Buekens, MD, MPH (2003-2018, sabbatical 2013)
- LuAnn White, PhD (acting dean, 2013)
- Thomas LaVeist, PhD (2018-)

== Location ==
Tulane's Celia Scott Weatherhead School of Public Health and Tropical Medicine is located at 1440 Canal St, New Orleans, Louisiana in the Central Business District neighborhood. Its building is one of the tallest buildings in New Orleans, and is colloquially known as the Tidewater building. The area of the CBD that the School is in is currently being referred to as the Bioscience District, and was previously referred to as the Medical District. The BioDistrict is the site of $1.09 billion in new construction for the University Medical Center project that replaced Charity Hospital in 2015. An additional ~$1.0bn was spent in the neighborhood on the new Southeast Louisiana Veterans Health Care System VA Hospital. The BioDistrict also includes the new 66,000 square foot BioInnovation Center and the 155,000 square foot Louisiana Cancer Research Center. The Tidewater building is most easily accessible by road, street car, and Tulane University Shuttles. The Tidewater Building is a short walk from Vieux Carré.
