= UC San Diego Wertheim School of Public Health =

Public health school of UC San Diego

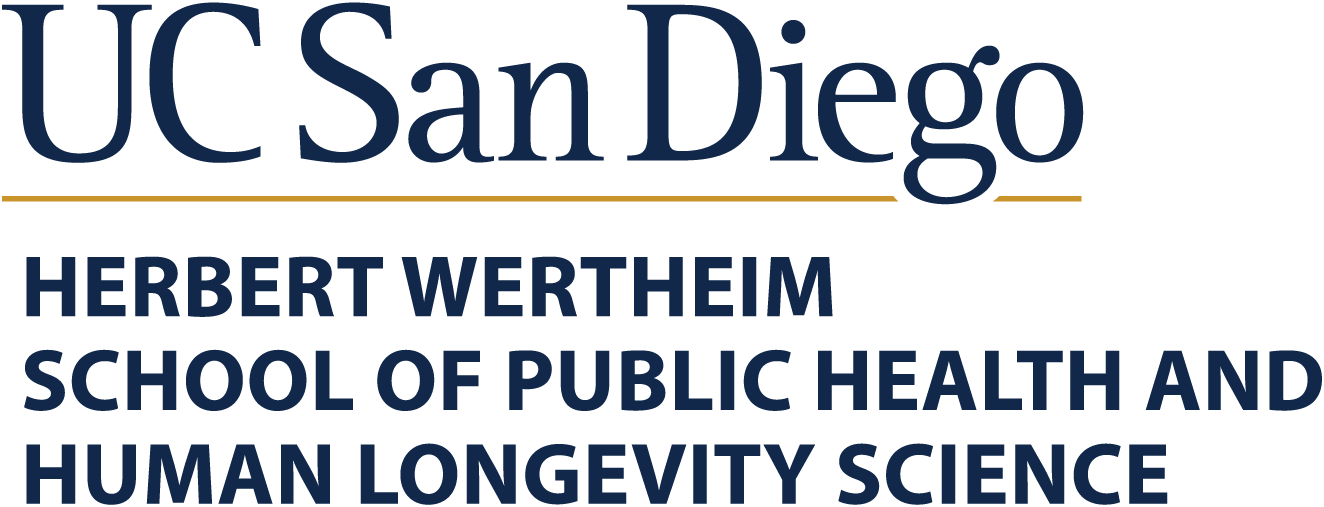
- Other names: Herbert Wertheim School of Public Health and Human Longevity Science
- Motto: Fiat lux Let there be light
- Type: School of public health
- Established: September 18, 2019; 6 years ago
- Parent institution: University of California, San Diego
- Dean: Cheryl A. M. Anderson
- Academic staff: 110 full-time 70 funded PIs
- Students: 775 undergraduate students 225 post-graduate students
- Location: La Jolla, California, United States; 32.876°N 117.237°W
- Campus: Urban
- Website: hwsph.ucsd.edu

The UC San Diego Wertheim School of Public Health (formally known as the Herbert Wertheim School of Public Health and Human Longevity Science) is the public health school at the University of California, San Diego. Its establishment was approved in September 2019 by the Academic and Student Affairs Committee at the Board of Regents of the University of California.

The school currently offers programs leading to bachelors (B.Sc.), masters (MPH & MS), doctoral (Ph.D.), and professional degrees. The school also offers a joint doctoral program in public health with San Diego State University.

== History ==
On October 23, 2018, UC San Diego received a US$25 million donation from the Dr. Herbert and Nicole Wertheim Family Foundation to help establish a school of public health named after Herbert Wertheim at the university, with UCSD planning to raise an additional US$50 million for the school's building. On September 18, 2019, the Academic and Student Affairs Committee at the Board of Regents of the University of California officially approved the establishment of the Wertheim School.

The school is currently led by inaugural dean Cheryl A. M. Anderson, who was appointed to the position in June 2020.
