= Lynda Lisabeth =

American epidemiologist

- Education: University of Michigan
- Scientific career
- Workplaces: University of Michigan
- Thesis: Methods for studying menstrual function across the reproductive life span. (2003)

Lynda D. Lisabeth is an American epidemiologist who is Professor and Senior Associate Dean for Faculty Affairs in the School of Public Health at the University of Michigan. Her research considers the epidemiology of stroke in the United States, and she has worked with the National Institute of Neurological Disorders and Stroke on the advancement of stroke research.

== Early life and education ==
Lisabeth was an undergraduate, graduate and doctoral student at the University of Michigan. She majored in statistics and biostatistics. Her doctoral research focused on epidemiology, in particular, the development of methods to study menstrual function across the reproductive lifespan. After earning her doctorate, she moved to the Department of Neurology, where she worked as a research investigator.

== Research and career ==
Lisabeth was appointed to the faculty of the University of Michigan in 2003, and was promoted to Professor in 2011. She works on the epidemiology of stroke, stroke health disparities and the prevalence of stroke amongst the Mexican-American population. Her early work identified that people who lived in areas with elevated levels of arsenic in the water had a heightened risk of stroke. Lisabeth has monitored the prevalence and recovery from stroke in a bi-ethnic community in South Texas. Working with Deborah Levine, Lisabeth studied the impact of stroke on cognitive decline, and showed that strokes can age brain function by over seven years.

Lisabeth identified that stroke survivors from lower socioeconomic backgrounds have worse recovery than people with higher socioeconomic status. She has also shown that women find it harder to recover from stroke and are more likely to suffer from depression. Whilst the reasons for this are unclear, Lisabeth has proposed that it is due to social factors (isolation, poor financial security). Her research indicates that women and Mexican-Americans are more likely to suffer from subarachnoid hemorrhage.

Lisabeth was elected Senior Associate Dean for Faculty Affairs in the School of Public Health in 2021.

== Awards and honors ==
- 2007 Elected Fellow American Heart Association

== Selected publications ==
- Dariush Mozaffarian; Emelia J Benjamin; Alan S Go; et al. (17 December 2014). "Heart Disease and Stroke Statistics--2015 Update: A Report From the American Heart Association". Circulation. 131 (4): e29-322. doi:10.1161/cir.0000000000000152. ISSN 0009-7322. PMID 25520374. Wikidata Q22241921.
- Mathew J Reeves; Cheryl D Bushnell; George Howard; Julia Warner Gargano; Pamela W Duncan; Gwen Lynch; Arya Khatiwoda; Lynda Lisabeth (21 August 2008). "Sex differences in stroke: epidemiology, clinical presentation, medical care, and outcomes". The Lancet Neurology. 7 (10): 915–926. doi:10.1016/s1474-4422(08)70193-5. ISSN 1474-4422. PMC 2665267. PMID 18722812. Wikidata Q37149840.
- Kevin A Kerber; Devin L Brown; Lynda D Lisabeth; Melinda A Smith; Lewis B Morgenstern (31 August 2006). "Stroke among patients with dizziness, vertigo, and imbalance in the emergency department: a population-based study". Stroke. 37 (10): 2484–2487. doi:10.1161/01.str.0000240329.48263.0d. ISSN 0039-2499. PMC 1779945. PMID 16946161. Wikidata Q35606744.
