= University of Oklahoma Health Sciences Center =

Medical school in Oklahoma City, Oklahoma, US

Coordinates: 35°28′49″N 97°29′47″W

University of Oklahoma Health Campus
- Type: Comprehensive health center
- Established: 1971; 55 years ago
- Provost: Gary Raskob, Ph.D.
- Faculty: 800
- Administrative staff: 2,400
- Students: 4,000
- Location: Oklahoma City, Oklahoma, United States
- Website: www.ouhsc.edu

The University of Oklahoma Health Campus in Oklahoma City, Oklahoma, United States, is the health sciences branch of the University of Oklahoma. It serves as the primary place of training for many of Oklahoma's health professions. It is one of only four health centers in the United States with seven professional colleges.

The nineteen buildings that make up the OU Health Campus occupies a fifteen block area in Oklahoma City near the Oklahoma State Capitol. Surrounding these buildings are an additional twenty health-related buildings, some of which are owned by the University of Oklahoma. The OU Health Campus is the core of a wider complex known as the Oklahoma Health Center. The major clinical facilities on campus are part of OU Medicine and include the OU Medical Center hospital complex, The Children's Hospital, OU Physicians and OU Children's Physicians clinics, Harold Hamm Diabetes Center and the Peggy and Charles Stephenson Oklahoma Cancer Center. Also, part of the major clinical facilities is the Oklahoma City VA Medical Center.

== History ==
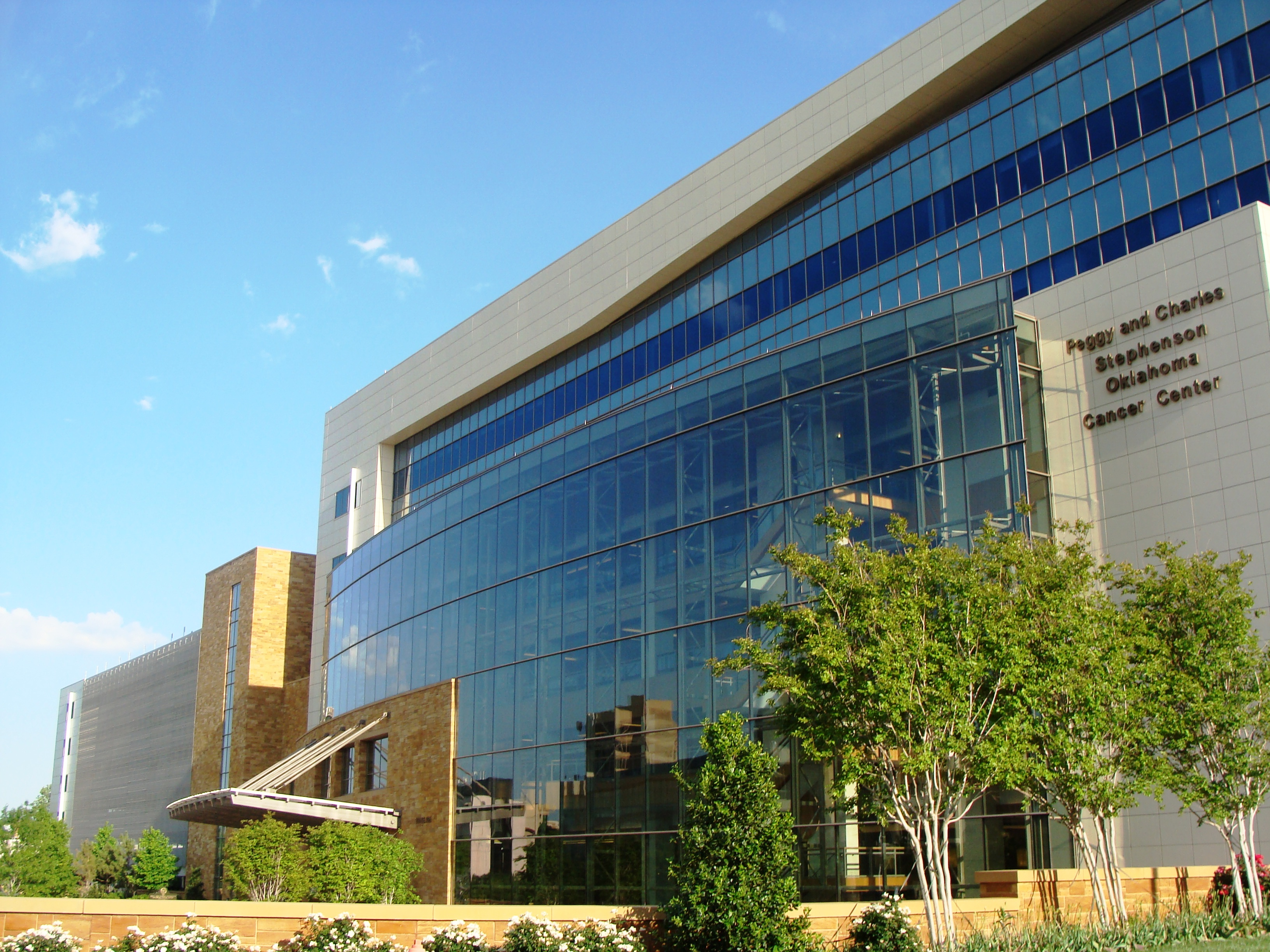
Stephenson Oklahoma Cancer Center on OUHSC Campus

The University of Oklahoma in Norman was founded in 1890, 17 years before Oklahoma's statehood, by the Oklahoma Territorial Legislature. In 1910, OU's fledgling two-year medical school moved to Oklahoma City and became a four-year program. A school of nursing was founded nearby the next year, and graduated its first class in 1913. In subsequent years a new university hospital was built, a graduate college for biomedical sciences was established, and the Oklahoma City Veterans Administration Hospital was constructed. A school of health was created in 1967, splitting twelve years later into a college of allied and public health. In 1971, the University of Oklahoma Medical Center became the University of Oklahoma Health Sciences Center and all schools on the HSC campus were designated as colleges. The college of Pharmacy, OU's oldest professional program, made the move from Norman to Oklahoma City five years later.

On July 1, 1993, the University Hospital system officially became independent of the State of Oklahoma Department of Health Services. In 1998, Columbia/HCA, a large hospital group based in Franklin, TN, entered into a joint agreement with the University Hospitals Authority and Trust (UHAT) to manage the hospitals. UHAT and community leaders founded the nonprofit, OU Medicine, which executed a $750 million buyout of HCA Healthcare's management agreement and ownership stake of its hospital facilities in 2018.

In 2025, OU Health Sciences researchers secured approximately $75.2 million in funding from the National Institutes of Health (NIH) for research, resulting in a national ranking of 102nd out of roughly 2,838 institutions that receive NIH funding and marking the highest such ranking in the institution's history.

== Institutions ==
Undergraduate demographics as of Fall 2023
Race and ethnicity	Total
White	61%
Hispanic	12%
Unknown	10%
Asian	8%
Black	5%
American Indian/Alaska Native	4%
International student	1%
Two or more races	1%
Economic diversity

=== Patient care institutions ===
- OU Medical Center
- The Children's Hospital at OU Medical Center
- Oklahoma City Veterans Administration Hospital
- Dean McGee Eye Institute
- Peggy and Charles Stephenson Oklahoma Cancer Center
- Harold Hamm Diabetes Center
- Oklahoma Blood Institute

=== Educational and research institutions ===
- University of Oklahoma
  - College of Medicine
  - College of Dentistry
  - College of Nursing
  - College of Allied Health
  - Hudson College of Public Health
  - College of Pharmacy
  - Graduate College
  - Robert M. Bird Health Sciences Library
- Children's Medical Research Institute
- Presbyterian Health Foundation
- Oklahoma Medical Research Foundation

==== Secondary schools ====
- Oklahoma School of Science and Mathematics

=== Government institutions ===
- Office of the Chief Medical Examiner
- Oklahoma State Department of Health
- Oklahoma State Department of Mental Health
