= West Virginia University School of Public Health =

Graduate school in Morgantown, West Virginia, US

The West Virginia University School of Public Health is a school of public health located in the United States city of Morgantown in the state of West Virginia; the WVU School of Public Health is the only School of Public Health in the state of West Virginia.

The WVU School of Public Health offers the following degree programs: the Master of Public Health (MPH) program, with six areas of emphasis including an online degree; the online MS in School Health Education; and the PhD in Public Health Sciences, with three areas of emphasis. The MPH program is fully accredited by the Council on Education for Public Health (CEPH). Council on Education for Public Health (CEPH) Other degrees are accredited by the accrediting body for West Virginia University, the North Central Association of Colleges and Schools. The new School of Public Health at WVU has begun the process which leads to school-level accreditation.

== History ==
On January 19, 2011, the Robert C. Byrd Health Sciences Center’s Chancellor, Christopher Colenda announced that West Virginia University would establish a new School of Public Health (SPH).

The West Virginia University School of Public Health officially opened for the Fall semester of 2012, starting with 184 students 46 faculty members, including 14 new faculty members. One of the new faculty represents the first collaborative “secondary” appointment with the WVU College of Physical Activity and Sport Sciences.

== Academic departments ==
- Department of Biostatistics
- Department of Epidemiology
- Department of Health Policy, Management & Leadership
- Department of Occupational & Environmental Health Sciences
- Department of Social & Behavioral Sciences

== Online Programs ==
The School of Public Health currently offers two online programs, the MS in School Health Education and the MPH in Public Health Practice.

== Research ==
The WVU School of Public Health has a rich research program with a focus on rural health issues. Perhaps because of its unique rural Appalachian niche, research projects undertaken by the SPH faculty are frequently cited by regional, national, and international news sources (10). A distinguishing feature of the WVU School of Public Health’s research is a very high rate of publication by students with their faculty mentors. A Research Focus newsletter updates the grant participation and peer-reviewed publication of faculty and students on a quarterly basis.
