= University of Michigan School of Public Health =

Graduate school in Ann Arbor, Michigan, US

Coordinates: 42°16′51.0″N 83°43′49.3″W

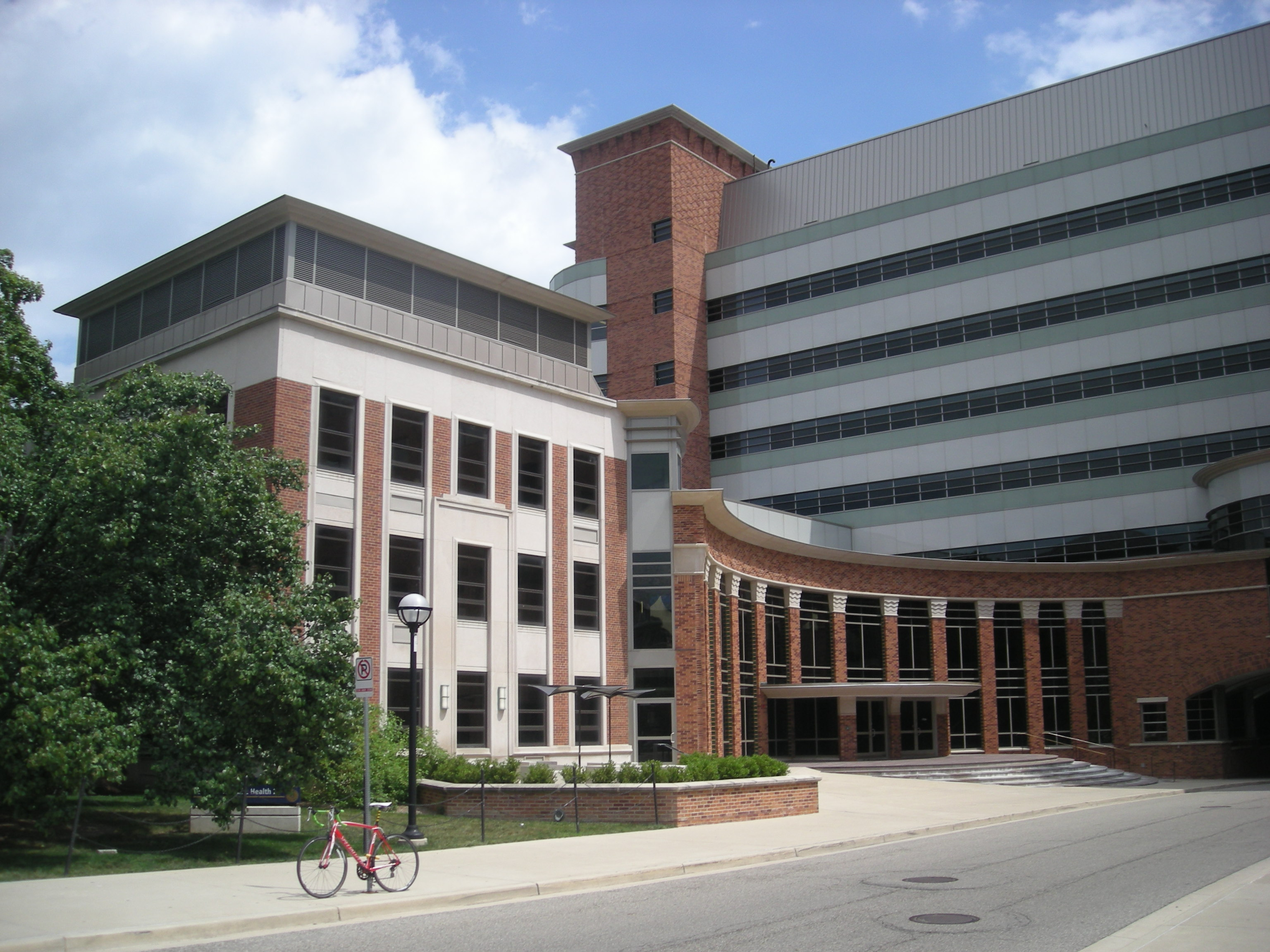
- Type: Public
- Established: 1941; 85 years ago
- Parent institution: University of Michigan
- Dean: Lynda Lisabeth (interim)
- Students: 1,307 (2024)
- Location: Ann Arbor, Michigan, US
- Campus: Suburban
- Website: sph.umich.edu

The University of Michigan School of Public Health is the public health school of the University of Michigan, a public research university in Ann Arbor, Michigan, United States. The school is one of the oldest schools of public health in the country and is considered one of the top schools focusing on health in the United States. Founded in 1941, the School of Public Health grew out of the University of Michigan's degree programs in public health, some of which date back to the 19th century.

== Departments ==
The University of Michigan School of Public Health consists of six academic departments:

- Department of Biostatistics
- Department of Environmental Health Sciences
- Department of Epidemiology
- Department of Health Behavior and Health Equity
- Department of Health Management and Policy
- Department of Nutritional Sciences

== People ==
=== Notable faculty ===
- Thomas Francis Jr., mentor of Jonas Salk; ran field trials of oral polio vaccine that deemed it safe and effective
- Rebecca Hasson, kinesiologist
- Sharon Kardia is the Millicent W. Higgins Collegiate Professor of Epidemiology
- Neal Krause, health behavior and health education expert
- Jonas Salk, developer of the polio vaccine

=== Notable alumni ===
- Larry Brilliant, physician, epidemiologist, technologist, author, and the former director of Google's philanthropic arm, Google.org
- Julio Frenk, former Minister of Health in Mexico, former dean of Harvard School of Public Health
- David Michael Green, MacArthur Foundation Fellow
- Mary Hawn, chair of surgery at Stanford University and member of the National Academy of Medicine
- Albert H. Wheeler, first African-American Mayor of Ann Arbor, Michigan
- Mona Hanna-Attisha, pediatrician who was a key whistleblower revealing the Flint Water Crisis which exposed children to dangerous levels of lead in Flint, Michigan
- Ebony Carter, an obstetrician currently serving as Division Director of Maternal-Fetal Medicine for the University of North Carolina School of Medicine, best known for her research in health equity.
