= Kent State University College of Public Health =

College division in Kent, Ohio, US

Coordinates: 41.152137°N 81.347311°W

The Kent State University College of Public Health was established in 2009. It is one of only two colleges of public health in Ohio, and it is the first school in the state to offer a Bachelor of Science in Public Health. Its goal is to train students to meet the existing and projected shortage of public health professionals across the nation.

The College of Public Health is built on the Academic Health Department model which fosters collaboration between schools and local public health agencies to combine academic scholarship and public health practice.

== Degree & Certificate Programs ==
The College of Public Health offers a variety of degree and certificate programs at both the undergraduate and graduate levels:

- The undergraduate public health certificate is an 18-credit hour certificate that provides an introduction to the major public health disciplines.
- The Bachelor of Science in Public Health requires students to complete 121 hours of required courses, public health concentration courses and approved electives, as well as an internship. Students enrolled in this program can choose from seven concentrations: Health Service Administration, Health Promotion and Education, Global Health, Allied Health, Prevention and Preparedness, Pre-Medicine, and Environmental/Sanitation.
- The Masters in Public Health is a 45-credit hour program organized into five curricular domains. Students can choose to specialize in one of five areas: Epidemiology, Biostatistics, Environmental Health Sciences, Social and Behavioral Sciences and Health Policy and Management.
- The Doctorate in Public Health gives students the opportunity to earn their Ph.D. in Public Health with a specialization in Prevention Science, Epidemiology, or Health Policy and Management.

Kent State’s College of Public Health also offers a variety of graduate assistantships for students pursuing their Master's and Doctoral degrees.

== Faculty Information ==
At the present time Kent State's College of Public Health has 18 full-time faculty members who operate across five disciplines: epidemiology, biostatistics, environmental health sciences, social and behavioral sciences and health policy and management. They have an established record of grant-funded scholarship and research, and throughout their careers have accumulated a total of $29 million in externally funded research.

Faculty members in the College of Public Health regularly engage in research that aims to provide solutions for societal problems such as preventing violence, responding to natural and manmade disasters, curbing substance abuse, and improving the delivery of healthcare.

== Student Alliance ==
The Public Health Student Alliance (P.H.S.A.) at Kent State operates as the central student association and coordinating organization for the College of Public Health. Membership is open to any student interested in Public Health, and the overall mission is to improve society's quality of life. To become a member a student must fill out an application form and pay dues of $5.00/semester or $10/year.

P.H.S.A sponsors the college's Speaker Series, which brings in industry professionals, professors and researchers to talk about important issues within the public health arena.

== Advising Department ==
The College of Public Health has its own advising department solely for students who are interested in pursuing a degree in public health. Students can schedule an individual advising appointment to ask questions, get additional information and receive assistance filling out forms.

== Accreditation ==
The College of Public Health is seeking accreditation through the Council on Education for Public Health as a full school. On October 26, 2012, the college was announced as an Associate Member in the Association of Schools of Public Health, and is in its self-study period.
