= University of Massachusetts Amherst School of Public Health and Health Sciences =

School at the University of Massachusetts

Coordinates: 42°23′39.8″N 72°31′33.8″W

- Type: Public
- Website: http://www.umass.edu/sphhs/

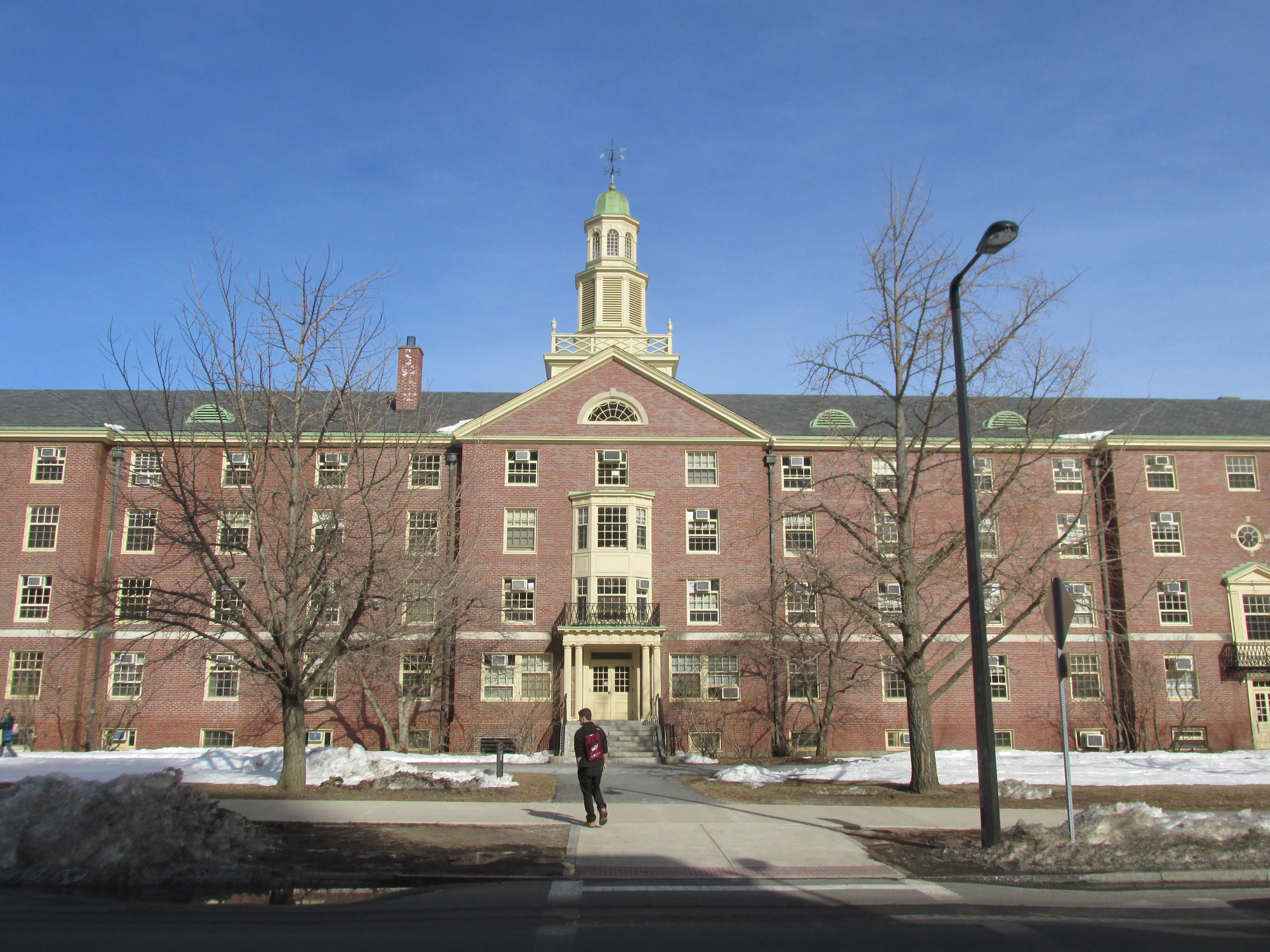
Arnold House, School of Public Health and Health Sciences

The University of Massachusetts Amherst School of Public Health and Health Sciences is a school at the University of Massachusetts Amherst.
