= University of Iowa College of Public Health =

Coordinates: 41.664349°N 91.542467°W

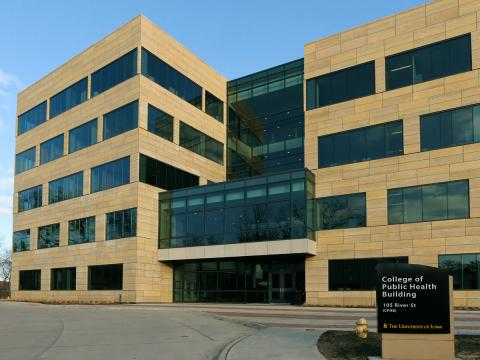
- Established: 1999; 26 years ago
- Type: Public
- Dean: Edith Parker
- Location: Iowa City, Iowa
- Website: www.public-health.uiowa.edu

The University of Iowa College of Public Health is one of eleven colleges based in the University of Iowa. Established on July 1, 1999, the college's roots originate in the Department of Preventive Medicine and Environmental Health, and with the Graduate Program in Hospital and Health Administration. Both of these were formerly based in the University of Iowa College of Medicine. The College of Public Health Building has achieved Leadership in Energy and Environmental Design (LEED) Platinum certification, the highest standard for sustainable design.

== Departments ==
The college is composed of five departments: biostatistics, community and behavioral health, epidemiology, health management and policy, and occupational and environmental health. The college offers training leading to bachelor's, master's, and doctoral degrees as well as combined degree options.

== Accreditation ==
The college is accredited by the Council on Education for Public Health, an independent agency recognized by the United States Department of Education to accredit schools of public health. Within the Department of Health Management and Policy, the M.H.A. program is accredited by the Commission on Accreditation Healthcare Management Education (CAHME).

== Ranking ==
The University of Iowa College of Public Health is the #19 school of public health in the nation, according to the 2019 rankings from U.S. News & World Report. Among publicly supported schools, the college ranks #9. The college’s Department of Health Management and Policy is ranked #8 overall, and #5 among publicly supported programs in health care management. The Department of Biostatistics is ranked #40 among all statistics and biostatistics programs combined, #13 among biostatistics programs alone, and #7 among biostatistics programs at publicly supported universities.
