= Charles L. Flint =

American politician

Charles Louis Flint
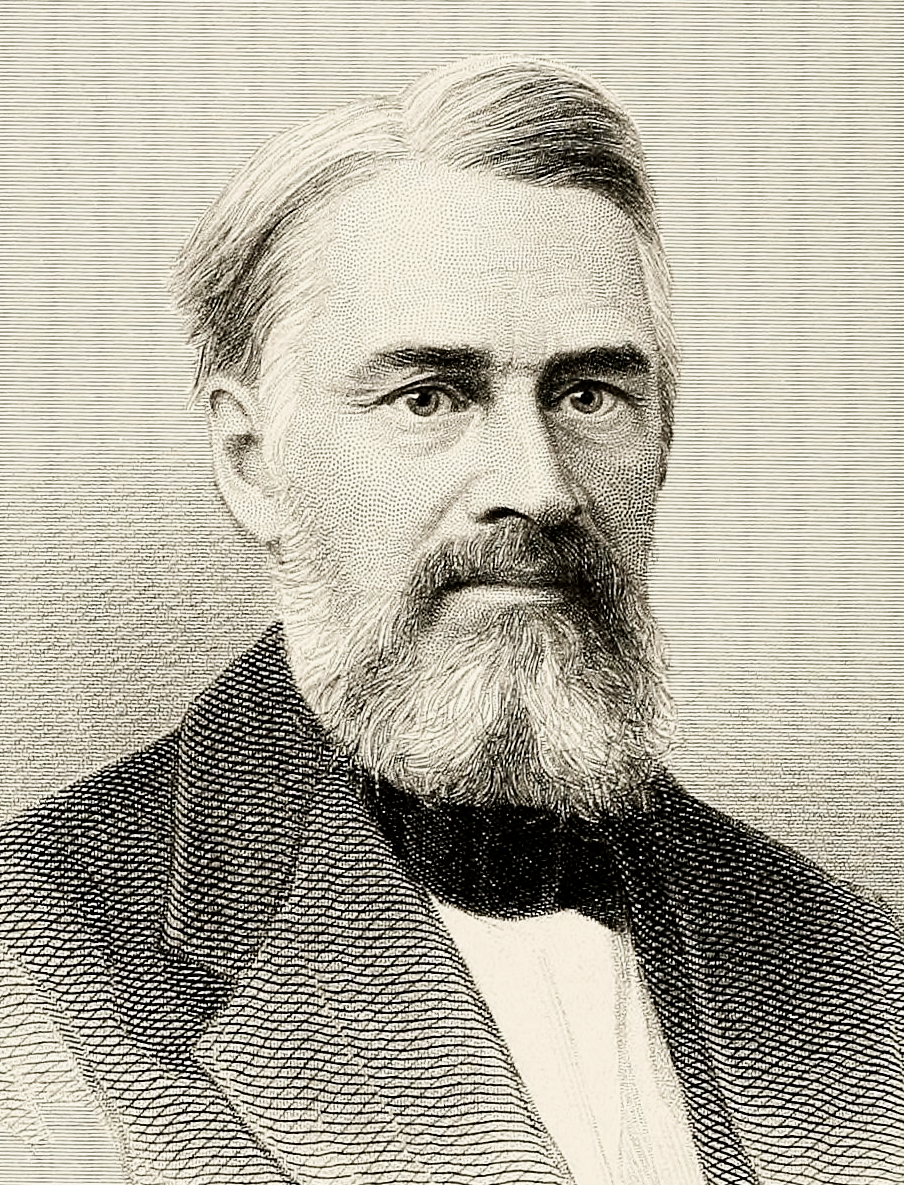
- Charles L. Flint circa 1874

President of the Massachusetts Agricultural College (now the University of Massachusetts Amherst)
- In office 1879–1880

Editor of the Old Farmer's Almanac
- In office 1861–1869

Secretary of the Massachusetts Board of Agriculture (now the Massachusetts Department of Food and Agriculture)
- In office 1853–1880

Personal details
- Born: May 8, 1824 Middleton, Massachusetts, U.S.
- Died: February 26, 1889 (aged 64) Sharon, Georgia, U.S.
- Spouse: Ellen Elizabeth Leland (1857–1875)
- Education: Harvard College (LL.B.); Dane Law School (M.A.)

Charles Louis Flint (May 8, 1824 – February 26, 1889) was a lawyer, cofounder and first secretary of the Massachusetts Board of Agriculture, a lecturer in cattle and dairy farming, the first secretary of the Massachusetts Agricultural College Board of Trustees (now known as the University of Massachusetts Amherst) and the college's fourth president.

Flint was born in Middleton, Massachusetts, on May 8, 1824. He graduated from Harvard University in 1849 and entered the Law School in 1850. In 1853, he became secretary of the newly formed Massachusetts Board of Agriculture, remaining in that position for 27 years. He was a member of the Boston School Committee and was involved in founding of the Massachusetts Institute of Technology.

Flint was one of the founders of the Massachusetts Agricultural College, where he lectured on dairy farming for four years. He served as elected secretary of the board of trustees for 22 years. On the resignation of President Clark during a budgetary crisis in 1879, Flint was elected president and served without a salary. After reorganizing the debt-ridden college with some success, he placed his resignation in the spring of 1880, and eventually left his post as secretary of the college board in 1885. In the later years of his life, Flint worked as president of the New England Mortgage Security Company, and remained an active member of the Massachusetts Horticultural Society and the Boston Society of Natural History. After a period of declining health he died during a trip to the South, on February 26, 1889, at a hotel in Hillman, Georgia.

== Education and early life ==
Charles Flint, born in Middleton, Massachusetts, on May 8, 1824, was the second son of farmers Jeremiah and Mary Flint (née Howard). Thomas Flint, the first of the Flint family to come America, departed from Wales, settling on his homestead in present-day Peabody in 1640. Charles Flint and his siblings would be the seventh generation to farm on the family's heirloom estate; as a child, much of his time was divided between doing chores on the farm and attending school in the winter, both of which unquestionably influenced his careers in agriculture and education later in life. At the age of 12 everything changed when his mother died, and after the two years that followed he was sent to live with his uncle, owner a large farm in Norway, Maine There he would continue his studies in the local school, dedicating much of his remaining time to working on his uncle's farm. Flint would credit this entire turn of events as what ultimately gave him his drive as well as his ability to write concisely and fervently about agricultural, but his passion for writing had only begun to manifest itself. It was around this time that a teacher of his, having not accomplished the same, convinced him that to get liberal education in order benefit him in his future interests; ever determined to better himself, Flint left Maine at the age of 17, enrolling in the Phillips Academy of Andover, Massachusetts. Unfortunately Flint would later attribute these trying times for his poor health in later years, having to constantly support himself while gaining his education. He would graduate from Philips in 1845, entering Harvard in the fall of that same year; ever having trust in the future, Flint attended both institutions virtually unaided financially. To pay for schooling he would constantly contribute essays, stories and prose to whichever publishers would accept them. One day, while waiting in the Salem railroad depot, Flint noticed an ad for the Essex Agricultural Society offering a $20 prize for the best essay on Indian corn, after a moment's consideration, Flint decided to give it a chance. Upon returning to Cambridge he began to research the subject, becoming increasingly interested in its history until, by the time he had finished, it was a thorough history of the crop going back to its introduction as a staple to human civilization. Flint's essay would not only win the prize, but years later this paper would be responsible for his career as the Secretary of the Board of Agriculture. In addition to this Flint entered several literary contests, winning $40 (Note: Approx. equivalent to $1000 in 2010 US currency. WestEgg.com Inflation Calculator) for first place in Harvard's prestigious Bowdoin prize for an essay on "The Different Representations of the Character of Socrates, by Plato, Xenophon, and Socrates". He would also enter twice in the college's Boylston prize, winning first place in 1848 and second place in his senior year. After four years of rigorous schooling and working to pay for this education, Flint graduated from Harvard debt-free, with honors, in the class of 1849.

Upon graduation Flint was offered a position as principal of a grammar school, and would teach there for two years. Though brief, this fleeting experience would prompt much of his later interests in the cause of furthering higher education. Towards the end of 1850 he enrolled in the Dane Law School at Cambridge to prepare for a career in court law over the next two years. During this time he entered a Harvard post-graduate essay prize, winning $50 for the best paper discussing the "Representative System at Different Times and in Different Countries." Meanwhile, he was commended with a silver medal from the New York State Agricultural Society, whose members and chairman had found his 1846 essay on Indian corn "very successful in throwing much and additional interest" over the crop's history. For part of the time that he was attending law school, Flint worked under the supervision then-Commodore Charles Henry Davis for the American Nautical Almanac in Boston. Upon graduation in 1852, Flint was invited to practice at law firm in New York City. For the first several months he studied the New York code of law and was admitted to the New York bar in October, 1852; of which he would remain a member for much of his life.

== Massachusetts Board of Agriculture ==
The organization of the Massachusetts Board of Agriculture had begun following the Governor's signing of its Act of Legislation on April 21, 1852, around the same time that Flint was finishing his studies in law. Led by the Hon. Marshall P. Wilder, a merchant and advocate of agricultural education for more than a decade prior, the goal was to create a permanent government body that would accurately gather statistics on the crop returns of the county agricultural societies as well as provide a forum for the advancement of the state's agriculture. This Board was to be a representative body reporting to the state's senate and house, connected with to executive government with the Governor, Lieutenant Governor and Secretary of the Commonwealth serving as members ex officiis. (Note: Within the time that Flint was involved with the Board, the State Agricultural Chemist (known for a time as the "State Inspector of Fertilizers") and President of the Massachusetts Agricultural College would be added as two more members ex officiis. See the Fourteenth and Twenty-First Annual Reports of the Secretary of the Mass. Board of Agr.) The governor and this executive council would then appoint 3 members considered of scientific background, with the remaining membership being elected delegates from each county agricultural society, serving in terms of 3 years each.

The first order of business for the Board would be to find a secretary of competent administrative ability but familiar with the sciences as well; Wilder saw such a figure is as imperative for the organization's survival. Initially the members petitioned Dr. Edward Hitchcock, the president of Amherst College, to fill the position, to which he consistently declined. By this time Charles Flint had gained some distinction in the field of agricultural studies, having been a regular contributor to the Boston monthly "Journal of Agriculture", many of his articles had been reprinted in other periodicals in the United States and Europe. After reading Flint's essay on Indian corn, which had received two prizes by this time, Wilder and the other members of the Board became convinced that he was just the person they needed to fill the position. He was immediate writ a letter by a member of the Board, asking what he believed the duties of such a title would involve, to which Flint, ignorant to the fact that he was their prime candidate, responded to in great length. The Board was exceedingly impressed by this and promptly invited him to take the position, to which Flint emphatically declined. He felt that it would be a complete change from everything he had spent his life planning for, but after persistent solicitation by former Governor Everett, Wilder and others, along with the consultation of several close friends, Flint ultimately renounced his New York practice and accepted the position. Flint began his duties on February 14, 1853, spending the first several months conducting research at the Sheffield Scientific School of New Haven, Connecticut. He would hold this position for 27 years.

Up until the time of the Board's founding (and those in other states) agricultural science had been in a state of relative neglect in this country, with the small amount of literature printed mainly being reprints from European journals, and the journals of other sciences, industry and the arts dwarfing the agricultural literature that did exist. Over the next two decades Flint would help to rectify this through the publishing of numerous annual reports and outside literature. Some examples of this include the first of his reports which contained an extensive history of agriculture in the Commonwealth, the fourth of which contained a treatise on "Grasses and Foraging Plants", a revised edition of Harris's Injurious Insects, and a 450 book on "Milch Cows and Dairy Farming", all of which would go on to be printed for several more editions. His work was well received: Paul A. Chadbourne, a board member and future president of the Massachusetts Agricultural College himself, once stated Flint's treatise on grasses "embodies the most practical and scientific information on the history, culture and nutritive value of the grasses and the grains. His style of writing is plain, simple, forcible and judiciously adapted to the ends he has in view. The large number of illustrations of the different species of grasses are drawn with great care and accuracy, and greatly facilitate the study and identification of unknown specimens."

After 25 years of service, Flint submitted his resignation to the Board. Originally he had been told that, ideally, he would hold the position for some twenty years, and having contemplated leaving for some years prior, Flint had decided that the time was overdue. After consideration, the committee declined his resignation, unanimously adopting the following resolution:

Whereas, Hon. Charles L. Flint has presented to the Board a statement concerning his connection with the same during the past twenty-five years, and has offered his resignation as secretary:
Resolved, That the Board desires to express its high appreciation of the valuable services of Secretary Flint, and hereby earnestly requests him to withdraw his resignation, and continue the good work on behalf of the agricultural interests of the Commonwealth, in which he has achieved so enviable a reputation.

Marshall Wilder also added to the resolution the following amendment:

Resolved, That the thanks and gratitude of the Massachusetts Board of Agriculture are eminently due to the Hon. Charles L. Flint, for the ability and fidelity with which he has discharged the duties of secretary for the last twenty-five years, in a manner alike honorable to the Commonwealth, and beneficial to its people.
Resolved, That we tender to Mr. Flint our personal acknowledgments for the courtesy and kindness which have ever characterized his intercourse with the members of the Board, with the sincere desire that the remainder of his days may be as happy and prosperous as the past have been honorable and useful.

Following the adoption of these commendations, Flint withdrew his resignation, serving two more years on the Board before resigning in 1880.

=== International work ===
In summer of 1862, Flint took an extended break in Europe during which he would pass through multiple countries and communicate with the farmers from each one. While passing through Germany, many of these farmers conversed with him about a grand-scale International Exhibition in Hamburg being planned July of the following year. It was to his surprise when, in the spring of 1863, the Board of Agriculture (along with every other state and Federal agricultural body) was given an invitation to attend this convention. The Board decided to name a commissioner to travel with the other state officials who would be in attendance, to which Flint received the appointment "unsought and unexpected[ly]". His detailed account of the exposition can be found in the Board's Eleventh Annual Report. Its wealth of information on breeds of cattle and other livestock, agricultural practices and the organization European agricultural schools would be republished in excerpts throughout American agricultural periodicals for many years to follow.

Flint's reports, though limited to 12,000 copies each, managed to circulate outside of the United States to many parts of the world. In the early 1880s (Note: The exact date is unclear, never mentioned in either Hurd's biography or the Boston Globe's obituary.) an International Exposition was held at Santiago, at which the government of Chile awarded and sent him a bronze medal and diploma "in recognition of the high quality and value of his reports."

== Marriage and family ==
Exactly four years after beginning his secretarial work, Flint married Ellen Elizabeth Leland of Grafton, Massachusetts, on February 14, 1857. Leland was a direct descendant of the first secretary of the Massachusetts Bay Colony, Edward Rawson for whom the couple would name one of their children. Years later, his two sons would attend the Massachusetts Agricultural College.

1. Charlotte Leland Flint, b. December 1, 1858
2. Charles Louis Flint, Jr., b. March 9, 1861
3. Edward Rawson Flint, b. September 8, 1864, for whom the Keene-Flint Hall (formerly "Flint Hall") is named at the University of Florida

Mrs. Flint died on September 25, 1875, the cause of her death not listed in her husband's biography.

== Massachusetts Agricultural College ==
In 1863, Flint was elected Secretary of the Board of Trustees of the Massachusetts Agricultural College, the land-grant college that had been founded that same year under the recently passed Morrill Act; he would hold this position for the next 22 years. Flint would also give a series of courses on dairy farming from 1868 to 1872, the subject for which a campus laboratory bearing his name would later be built for.

Since the time of its founding the college had gone through 3 presidents: Henry F. French, who resigned after 2 years of service, Paul A. Chadbourne, a member of the Board of Agriculture who had to leave the post due to ill health, and William S. Clark, now considered the college founder as the first president to admit students. For a time the college was considered a success while under Clark's leadership, however by the end of the 1870s enrollment had gone into steady decline, with no admissions from the farming region of Berkshire County in 1870 and less than 20 students admitted in the entering class of 1875. This decline in students and revenue, along with the college's needs for a library and laboratories, was causing the institution to lose thousands with each passing year. Clark was accused of incompetence, to which he would retort with consistent blame to the state for not providing the college with facilities, and the farming community for its indifference to the matter. As the situation worsened, agricultural societies began to discontinue their scholarships, there was no new support to be found from the state and between 1874 and 1877 the college's credit was upheld only by the personal backing of one of its trustees, William Knowlton. During Clark's time at Sapporo, Flint advocated for the state to give the college some two hundred scholarships from revenue that had been made from dog license fees. In the preceding year, the college had cut its veterinary science program in the face of mounting debt, leading the newspapers to call the move a "weakening of instruction". Unfortunately Flint and the trustees' pleas for scholarship funding fell on deaf ears, as the legislature of that year only allotted a small sum for paying for student labor on the college farm. In the next couple years journalists would continue to condemn the institution, with the Boston Globe insisting the school be abolished, and the Springfield Republican stating the college would serve better as a trade school; other cries from the Governor's office suggested that the college be turned over to Amherst College as an agricultural department. The farming community hadn't embraced the college as a whole, the institution faced still-mounting debt and many at Beacon Hill had begun to declare the college a failure; Clark resigned on May 1, 1879, weary of "time serving politicians and unprincipled newspapers seeking only to float on the tide of public opinion."

In order to survive, the college would need to undergo a period of reorganization, something which had never been done up to that time in its nearly 20-year existence. At a meeting of the trustees later in May 1879, the situation was seen as particularly grave and it was decided that it wouldn't be likely nor beneficial to call in an outsider, thus Charles L. Flint was unanimously elected to serve as the president of the college. Reluctantly, Flint accepted and would hold the title without pay, as well as his other secretarial duties until his resignation on March 24 of the following year. In the Twenty-Seventh Annual Report of the college, Professor of Agriculture and later President of the college William Penn Brooks describes Flint's extensive relationship with the college, in what was otherwise known as "the most stormy year of its existence":

"As secretary of the Board of Agriculture, trustee and president of the Agricultural College, and author of various standard works on agricultural topics, the name of Charles Louis Flint will long be remembered and revered...When, in 1879, William S. Clark resigned the presidency of the college, Mr. Flint reluctantly consented to assume its responsibilities, and for a year, during perhaps the most stormy period of its existence, guided it in safety through the troubled waters. He believed in the college most thoroughly, and emphasized his convictions by both precept and example, sending to it his two sons for education. Through all the vicissitudes of its earlier years he was its firm friend, and to him it is deeply indebted for advice and services. He gave it his best efforts, and he gave them cheerfully. A lecturer at the college, without compensation, he presented the individual members of its first classes with copies of each of his works on "Milch Cows" and "Forage Plants"; a president, without pay, he gave his services without a murmur, asking for no reward save that arising from the consciousness of having performed his duty; and in almost the last years of his life he gave a substantial token of his interest, subscribing a thousand dollars to the permanent library fund of the college."

By the time Flint had resigned from his duties as president, the accumulated debt had been paid off by the state, "as a man puts money into a contribution box" states the 1881 Index, and the college had reduced its annual expenses by $10,000. (Note: Equivalent to the end cost of overall salary expenditures for that year. Approx. equal to $225,000 in 2010 U.S. currency. WestEgg.com Inflation Calculator) In the course of that year "Professor of Mental, Moral and Social Sciences," Henry W. Parker offered his resignation, with the position abolished following his departure. Among other cuts the salaries of two other (unnamed) professors were reduced as were those of the treasurer and some janitorial services were withheld as well. Flint seemed satisfied with the reorganization, stating "The College is now, for the first time in several years, practically free from debt...It is impossible to see how the expenses can be reduced to a much lower figure, without seriously crippling the usefulness of the College, and curtailing its efficiency." His work was done, and the institution that he had worked so hard to help establish was once again on sound footing. In the year that followed, Flint would also resign from his duties on the Board of Agriculture, but would remain on the college's Board of Trustees until 1885. Following the three short-lived tenures of Stockbridge, Chadbourne and Greenough, over the course of which the college's reputation improved, Flint left, presumably due to poor health and likely in trust of Henry Goodell's (Note: Goodell would become the college's (and to this day the university's) longest serving president, serving from 1886 to 1905. See the MAC Index for those corresponding years.) ability to run the college for years to come.

== MIT and other efforts in higher education ==
"Our fathers trod the barren wild
Of this New England shore,
To raise a fane to sacred truth,
To stand for evermore.

In doubtful hope and anxious fear
They sternly persevered,
To lay foundations, deep and strong,
To principles revered.

Not as those noble fathers came,
Come we, their sons, to-day,
This tribute to their names to bring,
This debt of honor pay;

High hopes are ours that richest seed
Be sown for coming time:
Here may we true ambition feel,
To make our lives sublime!

Here may our young and ardent souls
To highest praise aspire,
And here may words of magic power
Enkindle living fire!

Here press we on with youthful might,
Life's journey just begun:
The future gleams with dawning light
From glory's blazing sun."
—Charles Louis Flint, written for dedication of a Lynn schoolhouse, 1850 (Note: Flint was a principal at another school at the time and his name is never mentioned in the 1850 reference, only giving credit to "C.L.F.", but he would reuse this hymn in 1869 at the dedication of the Rice Grammar School while chairman of that institution's committee.)

=== Massachusetts Institute of Technology ===
Funding from the Morrill Acts not only provided income for the Massachusetts Agricultural College but endowed the Massachusetts Institute of Technology as well. Flint was also instrumental in the creation of this institution, and spent a number of years serving on its founding committees, including the original Committee of Twenty, Committee of Publication, Committee of Associated Institutions, and the Back Bay Lands Committee. (Note: Before moving to the Cambridge campus, the Institute was located at a smaller campus in Boston for its first fifty years. See History of the Massachusetts Institute of Technology) Flint is described as an "ardent worker" in the founding of the institute, and would also serve on a committee of three alongside founding president William Rogers and secretary Thomas Webb. This group, though of few members, ultimately determined how the institute would garner aid from the recently passed Morrill Act of 1860, not an easy task as Cornell was the only other private institution that fit the necessary criteria. Undoubtedly Flint's legal background and interest in higher education were what made him suitable to serve on this small but important council.

=== Boston Public Schools ===
Flint took up residence in Boston during his time with the Board of Agriculture, and would remain involved in the city's school committee for a number of years there. It's unclear what exact year this involvement began, but Charles Flint's name is consistently listed in reports from 1867 through 1880. Throughout this time he would sit on many different subcommittees including (though not limited to), the city high school committee (as chair), the Rice Grammar School committee (as chair), the committee on music, the committee on drawing, the Franklin school district committee, the fifth division committee, the girls' high and normal school committee, and the city committee for school-houses.

In each of the years that he was involved with the city school committee, Flint would contribute to the Annual Report along with other members. The exact nature of his role in the organization is rarely outlined, however a thoroughly detailed account of his efforts in the Rice Grammar School subcommittee can be found in the 1869 report. Herein is a transcript of the building's dedication including Flint's speech and exchange of words with Mayor Shurtleff and former Governor Alexander H. Rice, for whom the school was named after.

== Later life ==
Flint placed his final resignation to the Board effective September 1, 1880. The secretaryship position paid relatively little, and after performing such duties for 27 years, Flint decided to go on to more lucrative business, becoming president of the New England Mortgage Security Company upon leaving the Board. The job, though following the work Flint pursued earlier in his life, was anything but relaxing, with a number clients inevitably taking the company to court over perceived violations. (Note: See the following court cases: United States Supreme Court (1892). New England Mortgage Security Company v. Gay – via Wikisource. Hunt v. New England Mortgage Security Company New England Mortgage Security Company v. Tarver et al.)

Flint still remained involved in agriculture, though to a lesser extent, and remained an active member of the Massachusetts Horticultural Society and the Boston Society of Natural History in his later years. He would also give a speech on the agricultural college's history at the cornerstone laying ceremonies for the new Stone Chapel in 1884.

For years he had been plagued with poor health, and would frequently take train rides south to recuperate for weeks at a time; accompanied by friend and associate O.B. Hadwen, his last trip proved too little and too much. After arriving days earlier, Charles Louis Flint died at the Electric Mound Hotel of Hillman, Georgia, on Tuesday, February 26, 1889, at the age of 64.

== Legacy ==
Though he left the Board of Agriculture in 1880, the name Charles Flint would not be forgotten by its members with many of their later publications paying him tribute. William Sessions, the third secretary of the board said of Flint in 1893, "Time would fail me were I to describe the work accomplished by the first secretary...in the twenty seven years he served the Board." In the same year a portrait of Flint was donated to the Board by one of his sons, it would hang in the organization's office for a number of years, though its current whereabouts are unknown.

The Charles Flint Public Library, of Middleton, Massachusetts, was established in 1891 with a $15,000 (Note: Conflicting accounts - according to the Flint Public Library $10,000 was bequeathed to the town whereas an 1889 New York Times notice states the amount was $15,000.) endowment left to the town in Flint's will. Before this time however, all other libraries of the town had been impermanent and with notably sparse collections. When the Flint Library was established it had a total of 5,000 volumes, compared with the present library collection which currently contains upwards of "40,000 books, 1300 videotapes, 1100 audiotapes and subscriptions to 185 periodicals."

Flint would also donate $10,000 to the Massachusetts Institute of Technology, $5,000 to the Genealogical and Natural History societies, $5,000 to the Phillips Academy in the name of a scholarship, and $1,000 to the Massachusetts Home of Intemperate Women. Of the $10,000 donated to MIT, $5,000 would be dedicated to a scholarship fund in "support of some worthy student, [with] preference to be given some graduate of the English High School, Boston".

At the time of writing, the Hon. Charles L. Flint lives on in name alone, with much of his and others' works of the 19th century agricultural science movement having fallen into relative obscurity in the last century. At the University of Massachusetts Amherst a dairy laboratory was built in his name in 1912, however the proposal for the building only credits him as the "fourth president of the Massachusetts Agricultural College", lacking mention of his extensive work in the state's other agricultural and educational affairs. The building, known as Flint Laboratory, has since been converted into offices for use by the Department of Hospitality and Tourism Management.

== Selected works ==
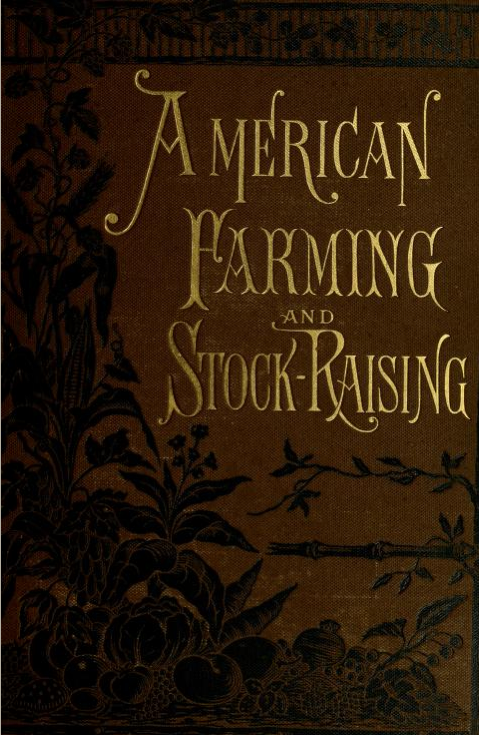
Flint was editor to this 3 volume set, which would be published in multiple editions following his death.

Flint would write a considerable amount of essays over the years, many covering agricultural and horticultural subjects, with particular focus on pomology, grains, dairy farming and the history of agricultural practices. The works listed below represent an incomplete catalog of the many works he contributed to periodicals and annual reports over the years.

- The History and Importance of Indian Corn as an Agricultural Product (1846), the essay that launched his career in agriculture
- The Agriculture of Massachusetts (1853)
- "Mineral and Other Manures: Their Action and Value", The British Farmers Magazine, Vol. XXIII; republished from the Boston Journal of Agriculture (1853)
- A Practical Treatise on Grasses and Forage Plants (1857) (Note: One noteworthy owner of this volume was Henry David Thoreau, who was known to have kept a copy in his personal library. Harding, Walter (1983). Myerson, Joel (ed.). "A New Checklist of the Books in Henry David Thoreau's Library". Studies in the American Renaissance. VII. Charlottesville, Virginia: The University Press of Virginia: 163. JSTOR 30227513.)
- Milch Cows and Dairy Farming (1859)
- Injurious Insects to Vegetation (1862), editor, originally by Thaddeus William Harris
- Agriculture in the United States (1864), section of Eighty Years' Progress of the United States
- A Hundred Years' Progress of American Agriculture (1874)
- Manual of Agriculture for the School, the Farm and the Fireside (1885), coauthored by George B. Emerson, revised by Charles A. Goessmann
- American Farming and Stock Raising with Useful Facts for the Household Vol. I Vol. II Vol. III (1892), editor, posthumous edition

Annual Reports of the Secretary of the Massachusetts Board of Agriculture

Printed on an annual basis with 12,000 copies each, these reports, from 1854 until 1880, were compiled and edited by Charles L. Flint. Each contains developments in cultivation techniques, advances in agricultural technology, accounts of different farming localities and architecture, and the annual financial and crop returns of the state's agricultural societies.

- First Annual Report, Vol. 1, 1854
- Second Annual Report, Vol. 2, 1855
- Third Annual Report, Vol. 3, 1856
- Fourth Annual Report, Vol. 4, 1857
- Fifth Annual Report, Vol. 5, 1858
- Sixth Annual Report, Vol. 6, 1859
- Seventh Annual Report, Vol. 7, 1860
- Eighth Annual Report, Vol. 8, 1861
- Ninth Annual Report, Vol. 9, 1862
- Tenth Annual Report, Vol. 10, 1863
- Eleventh Annual Report, Vol. 11, 1864
- Twelfth Annual Report, Vol. 12, 1865
- Thirteenth Annual Report, Vol. 13, 1866
- Fourteenth Annual Report, Vol. 14, 1867
- Fifteenth Annual Report, Vol. 15, 1868
- Sixteenth Annual Report, Vol. 16, 1869
- Seventeenth Annual Report, Vol. 17, 1870
- Eighteenth Annual Report, Vol. 18, 1871
- Nineteenth Annual Report, Vol. 19, 1872
- Twentieth Annual Report, Vol. 20, 1873
- Twenty-First Annual Report, Vol. 21, 1874
- Twenty-Second Annual Report, Vol. 22, 1875
- Twenty-Third Annual Report, Vol. 23, 1876
- Twenty-Fourth Annual Report, Vol. 24, 1877
- Twenty-Fifth Annual Report, Vol. 25, 1878
- Twenty-Sixth Annual Report, Vol. 26, 1879
- Twenty-Seventh Annual Report, Vol. 27, 1880
  - Appendix, concerning Flint's year as President of the Massachusetts Agricultural College

== See also ==
- Flint Laboratory
- Flint Public Library
- Marshall P. Wilder
- Massachusetts Board of Agriculture
- University of Massachusetts Amherst
