= James Greenough =

James Greenough may refer to:

- James B. Greenough (1833–1901), 19th-century American classical scholar
- James C. Greenough, 19th-century American educator and schoolmaster
