= Ellis Drive Historical Area =

Coordinates: 42°23′34.85″N 72°31′42.56″W

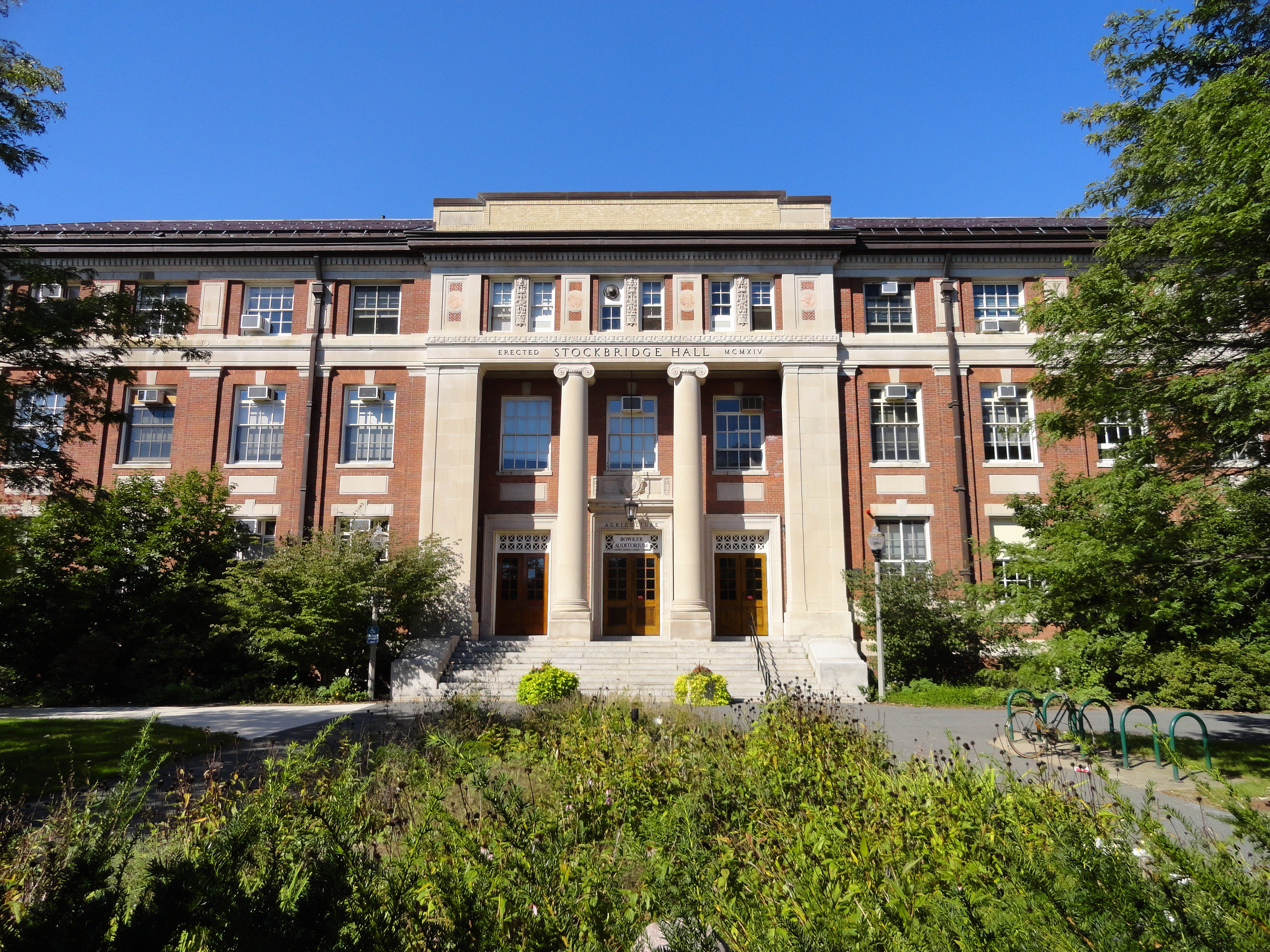
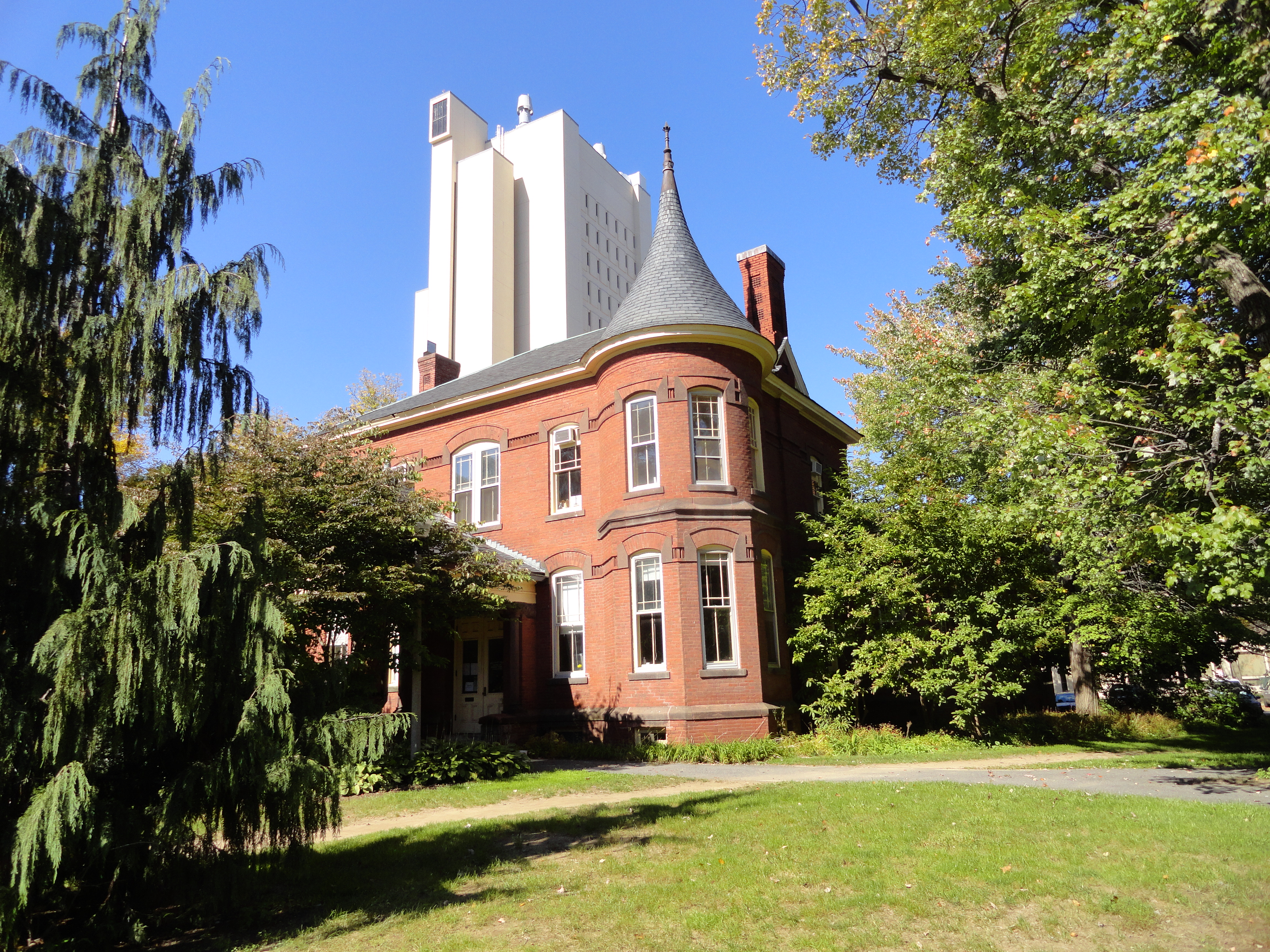
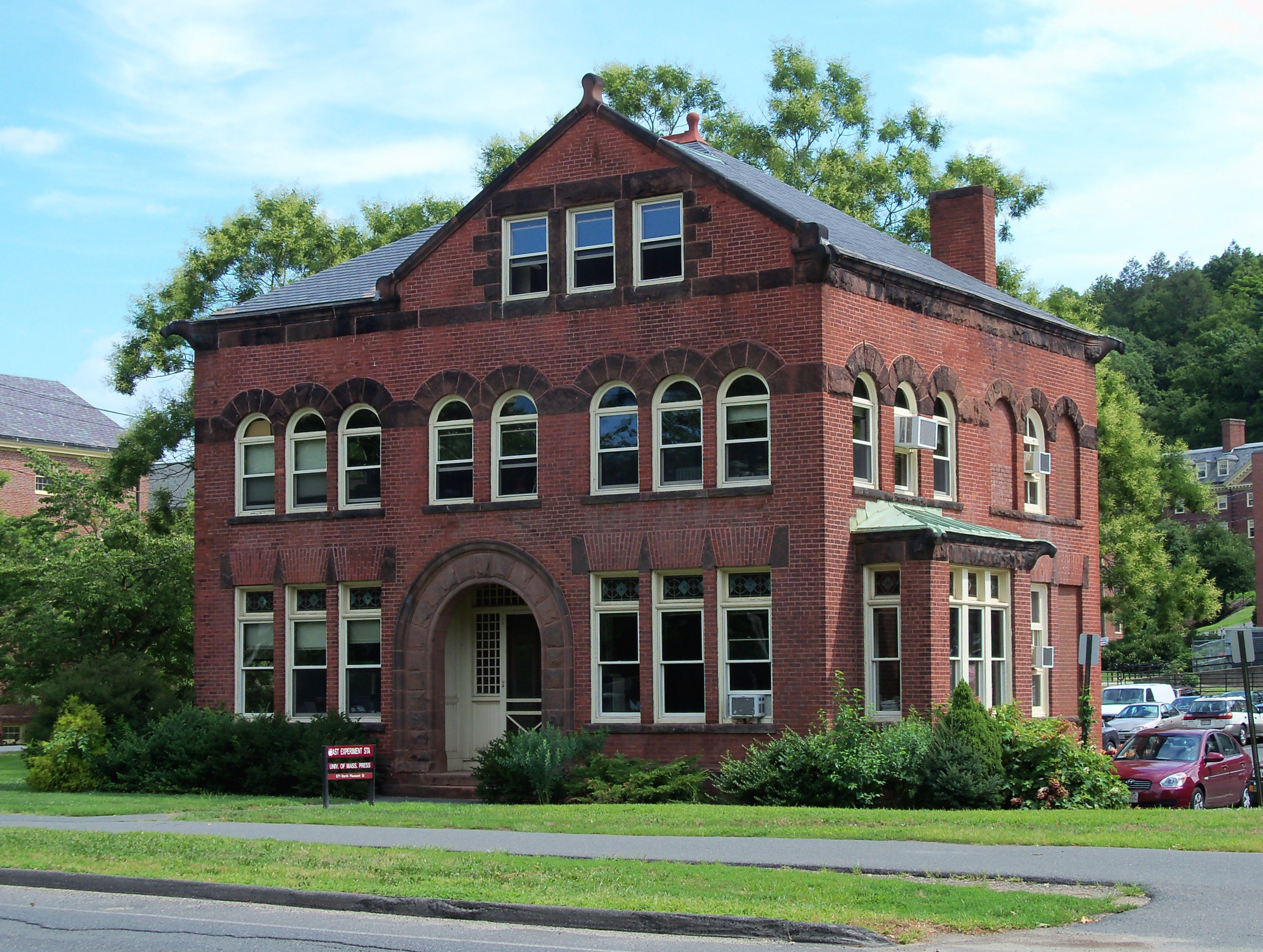
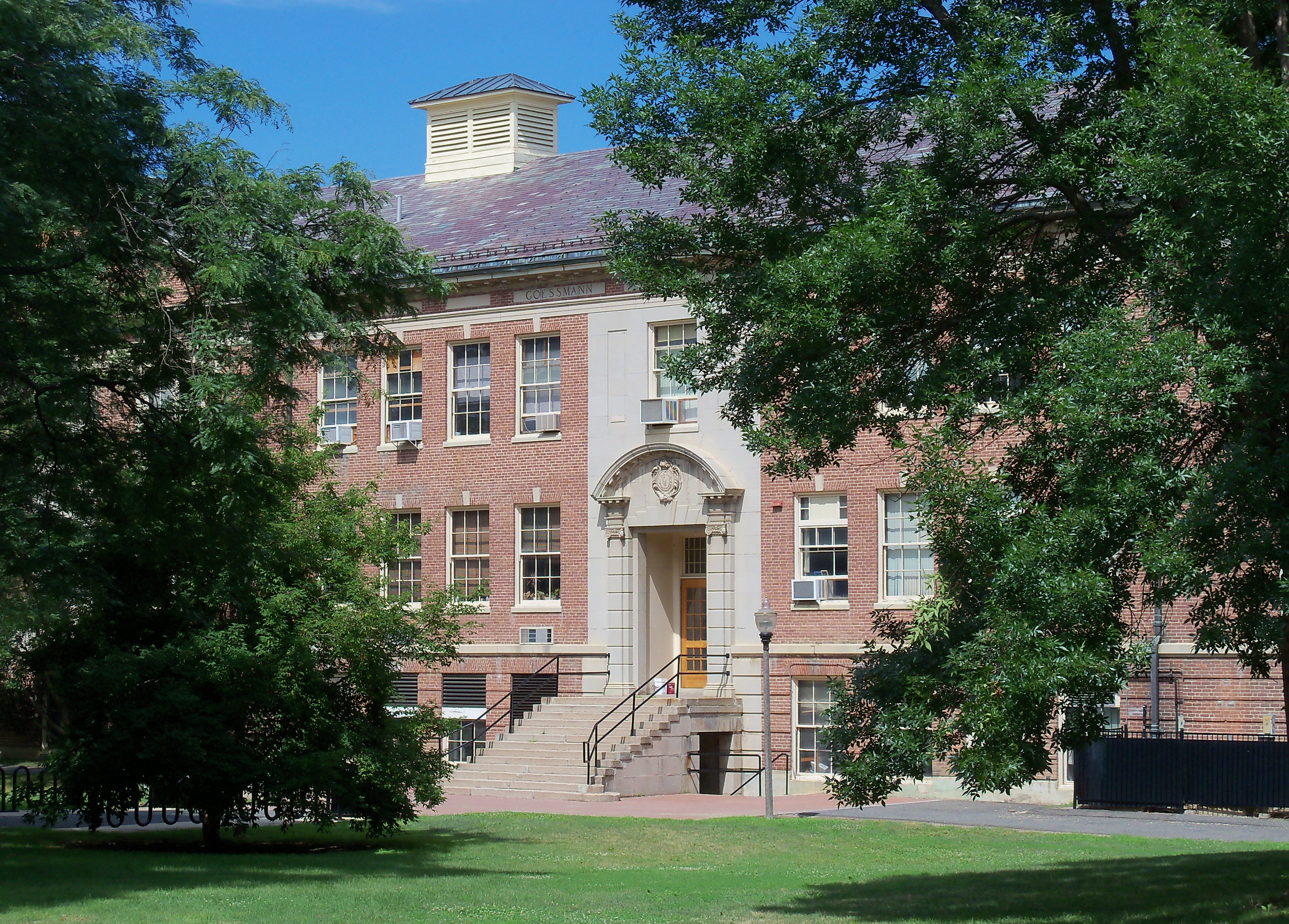
Clockwise from top: Stockbridge Hall, Goessmann Hall, the East Experiment Station, and West Experiment Station.

Ellis Drive, circa 1924. Behind the copse of trees on the far left is Flint Laboratory, along with Stockbridge Hall and Draper Hall on the right.

The Ellis Drive Historical Area is an older section of the UMass Amherst containing many of the university's earliest laboratory buildings. Several of these buildings have since been converted for other uses, but research still continues in many of them to this day.

== Historic buildings ==
- Agricultural Engineering North
- Chenoweth Laboratory
- Draper Hall
  - Draper Annex
- East Experiment Station
- Flint Laboratory
- Goessmann Laboratory
- Hatch Laboratory
- Skinner Hall
- Stockbridge Hall
- West Experiment Station

== Other buildings ==
- Hasbrouck Laboratory
- John W. Lederle Graduate Research Center
- Murray D. Lincoln Campus Center
- Physical Plant Complex
- Worcester Dining Commons

== Former buildings ==
- The Boarding House
- Abigail Adams House
- Infirmary Houses
- Marshall Hall
