= Campus of the University of Massachusetts Amherst =

College campus in Amherst, Massachusetts, US

Coordinates: 42.3906°N 72.5277°W

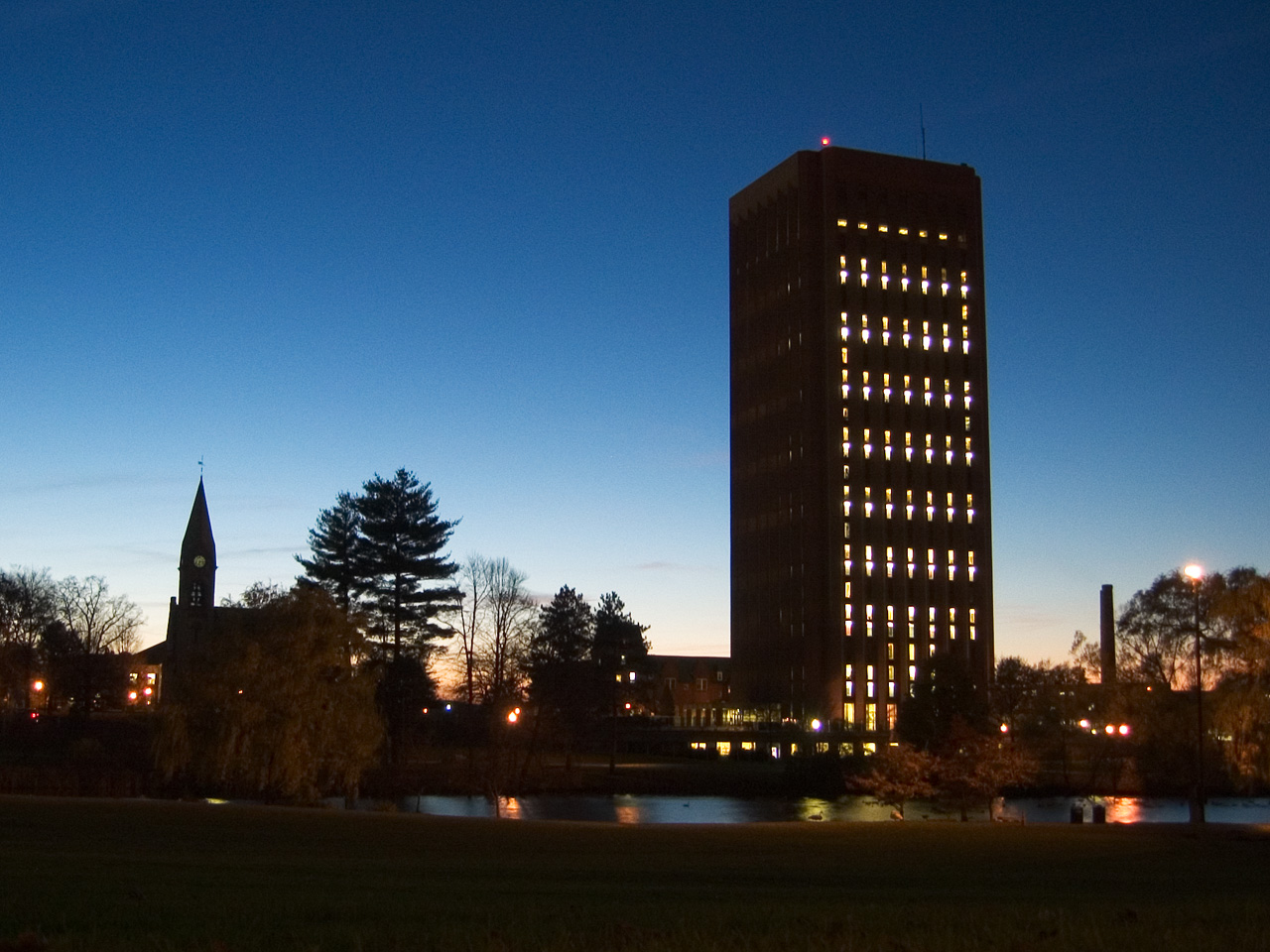
The center of the UMass Amherst campus. To the left is the Old Chapel, and to the right is the W. E. B. Du Bois Library.

The campus of the University of Massachusetts Amherst is located mostly in Amherst, Massachusetts, United States, with a portion located in Hadley. Founded on 310 acres (130 ha) in rural Western Massachusetts, the campus has grown to nearly 1,450 acres.

== Buildings and layout ==
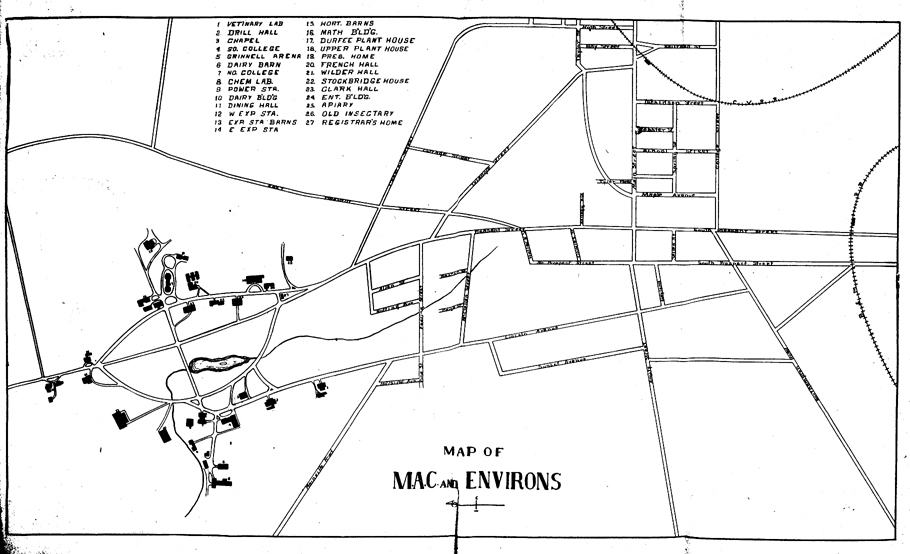
A map of the Massachusetts Agricultural College, c. 1912

The campus extends about 1 mile (1.6 km) from the Campus Center in all directions. The university owns significant amounts of land in the neighboring towns of Sunderland and Hadley.

The campus may be thought of as a series of concentric rings. In the outermost ring are parking lots, the admissions center, playing fields and barns for the animal science program. In the middle ring there are the seven residential areas and dining commons. (There are four dining commons on campus: Franklin Dining Commons, Worcester Commons, Berkshire Dining Commons, and Hampshire Dining Commons. The innermost ring has most of the classroom buildings and research labs.

John F. Thompson Hall is part of the campus. It contains the College of Social and Behavioral Sciences, and is connected to the Thompson Lowrise. It was named after the late John F. Thompson.

=== Architecture ===
The school has several buildings (constructed in the 1960s and 70s) of importance in the Modernist style, including the Murray D. Lincoln Campus Center and Hotel designed by Marcel Breuer, the Southwest Residential Area designed by Hugh Stubbins Jr, the Fine Arts Center by Kevin Roche, the W.E.B. Du Bois Library by Edward Durell Stone, and Warren McGuirk Alumni Stadium by Gordon Bunshaft of Skidmore, Owings and Merrill. Many of the older dorms and lecture halls are built in a Georgian Revival style such as French Hall, Fernald Hall and Flint Laboratory.

Recently completed projects on campus include the Studio Arts Building (2007), the Campus Recreation Center (2009), the Integrated Science Building (2010), a new Campus Police Station (2011), the George N. Parks Minuteman Marching Band Building (2011), Bowditch Greenhouse Addition (2011), and the renovation of the Southwest Residential Area Concourse (2011), the Commonwealth Honors College Residential Complex (2013), the Integrative Learning Center (2014), Design Building (2016), a refurbished South College Academic Facility, and the Physical Sciences Building. Recently constructed projects include an addition to the Isenberg School of Management (2019). This addition was done by Bjarke Ingels, a renowned modern architect.

=== South Campus ===
The Isenberg School of Management has its buildings in the southernmost part of campus near the Visitors Center and the Newman Center, the Catholic student center. In addition to being the site of the main administration building, Whitmore, the southeast side of campus has buildings mainly dedicated to the humanities and fine arts. Buildings include Herter, Bartlett, Mahar and the Fine Arts Center (FAC). Between Whitmore, the FAC and Isenberg lies the Haigis Mall, a local stop on both the PVTA and Peter Pan bus lines. The buildings on the southwest side of campus house the College of Social and Behavioral Sciences. These include Dickinson Hall and Tobin Hall.

==== Student Union ====
The Student Union Building houses most of the university's registered student organizations (RSOs) and is the home of the Student Government Association. Other facilities include a convenience store, a ballroom, and a student lounge. Several student-run businesses and co-ops are also present in the building, including Campus Design and Copy (CD&C), Tickets Unlimited, Bike Coop, People's Market (a fair trade convenience store/bagel shop), and a vegan/vegetarian eatery called Earthfoods Cafe.

The Student Union also includes a stairwell and a connecting passageway to walk through to the Campus Center. Many students can be found walking through the buildings rather than outside to get around campus, as well as doing homework in the lounge chairs.

==== South College ====
The Linguistics Department is located in the South College building. The DuBois Library was intended to be an annex to South College.

==== Campus Center ====
Designed by famed architect Marcel Breuer, the Murray D. Lincoln Campus Center is located adjacent to the Student Union and is accessible via passageways from both the Student Union as well as from the main level of the parking garage.

On the concourse level are the campus store, restrooms, graduate student lounge (now named the UPub), and the Bluewall, which contains a café, a smoothie stand, and a fair trade coffee stand. This level is a high-traffic area throughout most of the day, with students and faculty not only using it as a "pass through" from one building to another, but also as the central hub of on-campus life. Many people often pass the time between classes on this level and it is common to find organizations operating from fold-out tables along either side.

The lower level of the campus center building has multiple conference rooms and a large auditorium. Within the central space of the lower level are telephones, ATMs, vending machines, couches, and televisions. The offices of the university newspaper, The Daily Collegian, can be found at the far end of the level, along with the university radio station, WMUA, and its offices. One of the basement rooms is home to the UMass Science Fiction Society's library, the second largest library of science fiction on the East Coast (after that of the Massachusetts Institute of Technology Science Fiction Society).

The top floor of the campus center building recently underwent a complete renovation. It is home to a state-of-the-art teaching kitchen, beverage lab and dining room facility.

Above the concourse level is UMass Hotel (formerly the Campus Center Hotel), a five-level full service facility located in the Campus Center with 113 rooms, including four suites. UMass Hotel is the training ground for the university's Hospitality and Tourism Management students. The hotel was completely renovated and refurnished in 2009 and was renamed the UMass Hotel at the Campus Center.

=== North Campus ===
The north side of campus is mostly dedicated to science and engineering, and many buildings there are newer than their counterparts in the humanities. The Physics Department primarily uses Hasbrouck Lab, located at 666 North Pleasant Street. The Lederle Graduate Research Tower is the largest building on the north side, housing the Math Department on its sixteenth floor. As the Math Department headquarters, the sixteenth floor is prominently labeled 4^{2}. The Silvio Conte Polymer Research facility is located in North Campus.

Early campus maps show the Massachusetts Agricultural Experiment Station on the north apex of the original campus ring road. "The Center [of which the Ag Experiment Station is a component] is the proud bearer of [UMass'] national land-grant university tradition of agricultural research and education with which the university began." Its mission, begun in 1863 at the same time as establishment of Massachusetts Agricultural College itself made use of the 1862 Morrill Land Grant Act. The first buildings to house the Ag Station were the East Experimental Station and West Experimental Station. These are still situated on either side of North Pleasant, at the former crossing of the original campus ring road. Having outgrown both, the Ag Station (department) was eventually moved, but its historic buildings remain. Its former East Experimental Station now houses the UMass Press, and is located at 671 Pleasant. The nearby West Ag Station building had become unstable, and was dismantled in 2015 to make way for construction of the new Physics building, but its iconic façade was rebuilt and incorporated in the design and is now connected to the southwest side of the Physics building. Today, the UMass "Center for Agriculture" is itself a component of the College of Natural Sciences, working in cooperation with the U.S. Department of Agriculture. The center, now housed at nearby Stockbridge Hall is home to the present Massachusetts Agricultural Experiment Station, UMass Extension, the Water Resources Research Center and is the administrative offices for four off-campus farm-based research and education centers.

==== Computer Science ====
The Computer Science department moved into an airy building built for it on the edge of campus, though classes are often taught elsewhere, especially for lower division classes. Between the imposing concrete LGRT, the second-story walkway from it to its sister structure the LGRC, the glass-and-aluminum Computer Science building, and other new buildings for the Engineering and Polymer Science departments, North Campus looks more "high-tech" than the rest of campus.

=== Springfield Campus ===
In 2010, the University of Massachusetts Amherst opened the first building of its campus on Court Square in Springfield, Massachusetts—UMass's Urban Design Studio. Springfield is the largest city in the Knowledge Corridor, and the cultural and economic capital of the Pioneer Valley. UMass's Urban Design Studio is its first venture into Springfield, although in 2012, the university may move into a larger historically significant building next door to the current design studio.

== Campus Planning ==
University of Massachusetts Amherst Campus Planning, which is a division of Facilities and Campus services, performs tasks similar to municipal level planning departments. Its mission statement is:

To support the overall mission of the University of Massachusetts by guiding the physical development of its flagship campus through the creation, maintenance and administration of a campus master planning process. This is accomplished through communication and collaboration with the campus community supported by the use of dynamic and innovative planning processes and tools to produce creative, comprehensive and feasible solutions.

The University of Massachusetts Amherst first engaged in campus planning in 1866 with the help of Fredrick Law Olmsted. The most recent plan was adopted in 1993 and updated in 2007. As of 2011, the most prominent issues that need to be addressed are the accommodation of increased enrollment and the deterioration of some existing facilities.

== Sustainability on campus ==
The dining commons and campus center have qualified for the (OS1) Green Certified Cleaning Program, a program that stresses environmental health and specific standards.

The award-winning Central Heating Plant, opened in 2009, is one of the cleanest-burning plants in the nation. It reduces greenhouse gas emissions by approximately 75 percent from the previous coal-burning plant that dated back to 1918.

Across campus, other conservation measures have cut campus greenhouse gas emissions by 24 percent since 2004.

Sustainability Studies is offered through the University Without Walls, the university's adult bachelor's degree completion program.

== Sports, recreation, and exercise ==
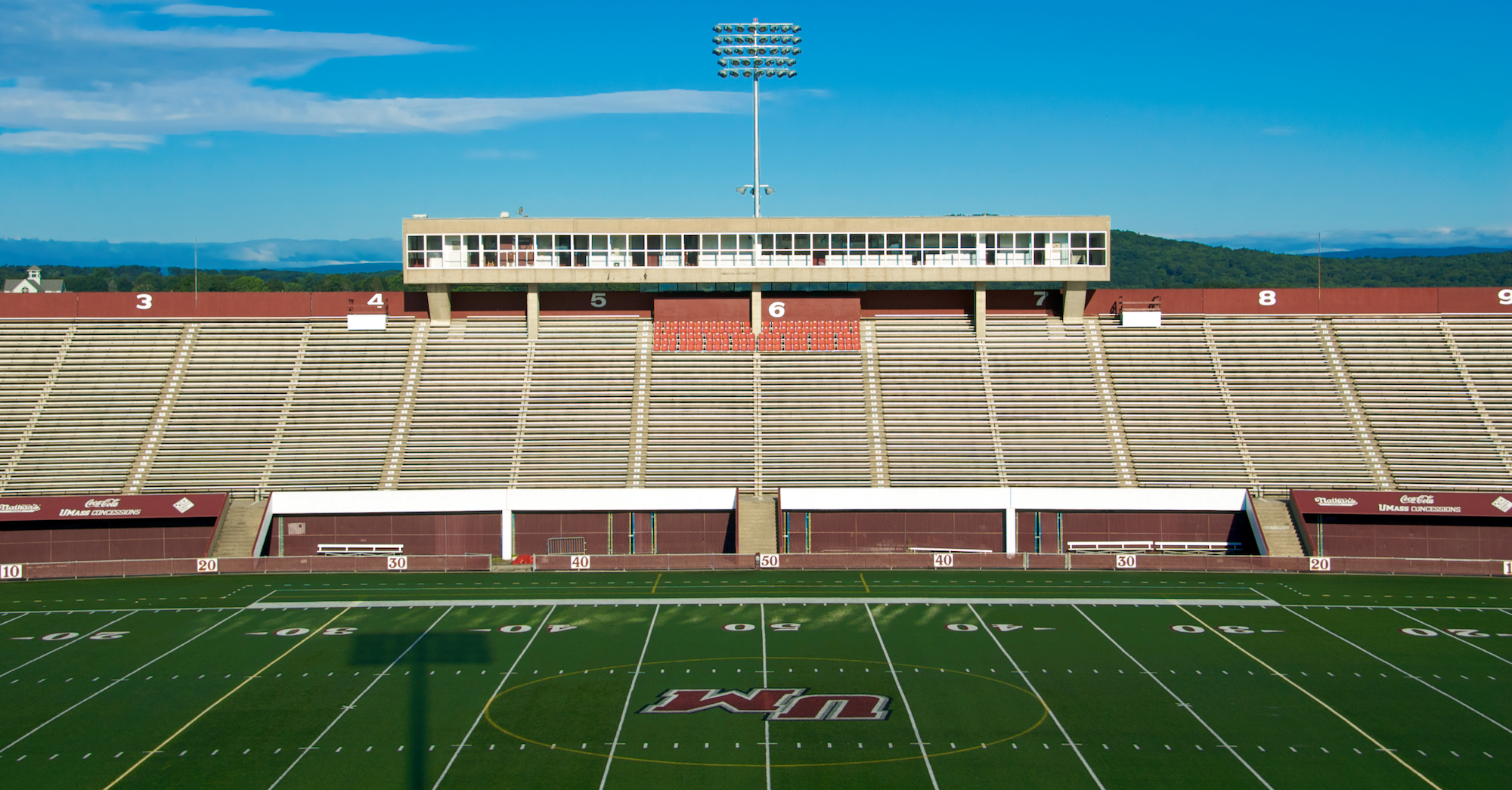
Warren McGuirk Alumni Stadium

Major sporting events, such as UMass's hockey and basketball team games, are held in the Mullins Center, amidst the fields to the west. Other locales for sporting events include Warren McGuirk Alumni Stadium (where UMass holds its women's lacrosse and football games) and Garber Field, which is an artificial-turf field adjacent to Boyden Gym used for lacrosse, field hockey, and various team practices.

In the fall of 2007, ground was broken across the street from the Mullins Center on a new $50 million recreation complex. The Recreation Center was completed in the spring of 2009 and spans three floors, including weight and cardio equipment, a basketball court and jogging/running track, activity rooms, locker facilities, and a juice bar. The Rec Center is free for undergraduates, and available for a fee to graduate students and faculty/staff. The building was originally scheduled to open in early September, but was delayed due to problems with fire safety and security systems. The Rec Center opened to the public on December 3, 2009.

On campus are two other gyms: Totman (adjacent to the North Apartments) and Boyden (near the Southwest residential area). Prior to 2009, both gyms held fitness centers which were then replaced by the Rec Center. Both buildings also hold basketball courts (although the Totman court remained closed in the fall 2009 semester), locker room facilities, and pools. Both buildings also hold classrooms and offices; Totman in particular is home to the kinesiology department and has a student-run body shop. Four small in-dorm gyms are available for a fee as part of the Wellness program; in Lewis (in Northeast), John Quincy Adams and Washington towers (in Southwest), and Webster (in Orchard Hill). To the west of campus are numerous fields used for recreation and intramural sports. There is also a set of tennis courts located north of Boyden.

The baseball team plays its home games at Earl Lorden Field, adjacent to the Mullins Center practice rink. Down the street, near Southwest, is the UMass Softball Complex as well as Rudd Field, home of the UMass men's and women's soccer teams.

In addition to Totman and Boyden, there is Curry Hicks Cage, which hosts a small indoor track, pool, and basketball court. It is also occasionally used as a venue for guest speakers (such as the fall 2006 visit from comedian Bob Saget) and for the Western Mass high school basketball championships and other similar sporting events. The Cage was the home of the UMass men's and women's basketball teams before the Mullins Center was built.

== Campus bus system ==
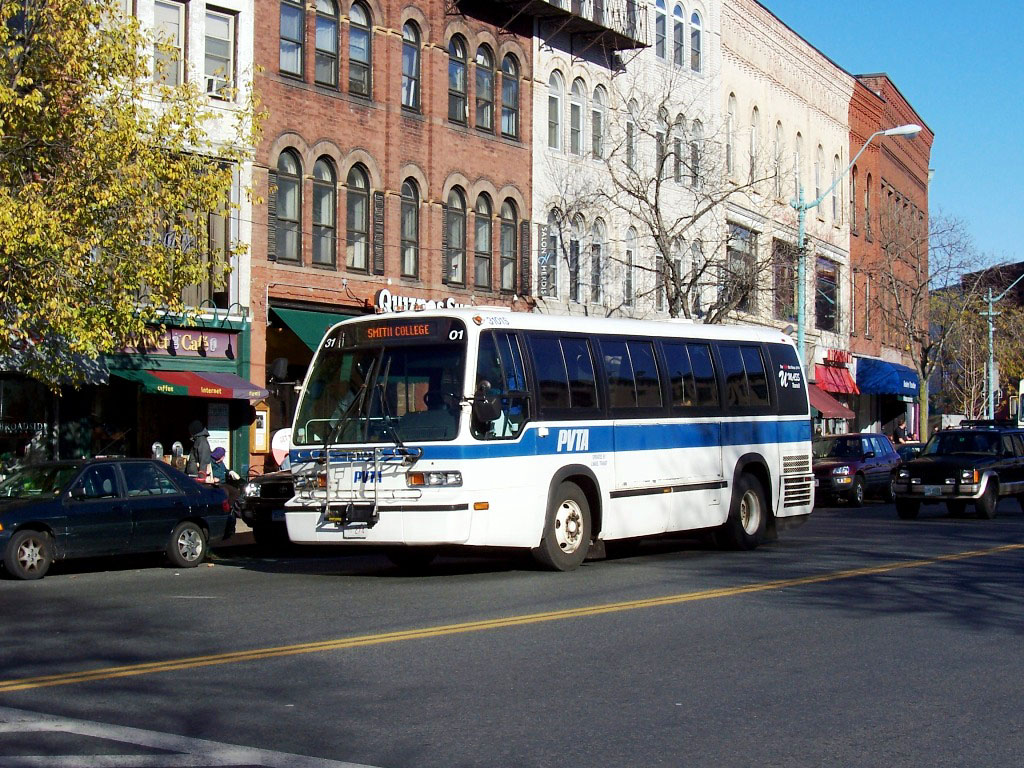
UMass and the PVTA, employing student workers, provide campus bus service throughout both the UMass Amherst campuses and the northern region of the PVTA service area.

The campus bus system was established in 1969 as the Student Senate Transit Services (now UMass Transit). In 1973, a demonstration grant secured money to set up a fare-free transit system. This, coupled with increased parking fees and strict parking regulations, was used to alleviate vehicular congestion and parking problems on campus. In 1976, the University of Massachusetts Transit Services became a contractor for PVTA. UMass Transit (UMTS) introduced an honor-based system in which any potential rider (not including students with valid UCards) during certain reduced service periods times of the year (or PVTA employees at any time of year) is expected to possess a ticket purchased locally in Amherst that grants either single or multiple rides, or a days or weeks pass purchased in Amherst or from a Springfield or Northampton bus. UMTS is a contractor for the PVTA, and runs its Amherst routes from a garage based on campus. It serves not only the University of Massachusetts campus, but also the surrounding colleges and communities. This bus system is run primarily by University students, and is free for students, which allows them to easily get to classes at the other four colleges.

== Residential areas ==
At UMass Amherst, only freshmen are required to live on campus. Housing is open to all full-time undergraduate students, regardless of year. Upper-class students who have continuously lived on campus during their first and sophomore years are guaranteed housing as long as they choose to live on campus. If, however, a student is admitted after their sophomore year, or moves off campus, and wants to move back onto campus, they are not guaranteed housing, but instead must go through a housing lottery, since demand outstrips supply. Housing assignments are accomplished by a complex process that takes into account building seniority as well as class year; those choosing to move from their building are subject to a lottery system. There are approximately 12,000 students living on campus.

== Parking on-campus ==
Parking at UMass is open to all students via Parking Services for a fee. Cost varies depending on seniority and location. Most typical student parking permits range from $60 to $300 for the year. It is a color-coded system with Green, Purple and Yellow Lots available to students. Purple Lots are typically closest to the dorm/housing areas; Yellow Lots are the cheapest but the farthest away; Green Lots are for commuter students. Parking is also available in the campus garage for a fee of $1.50 per hour during the day. The night rate is $3.00. Payment options include cash or UCard. Metered parking is also available at select locations throughout campus. The meters accept nickels, dimes, and quarters only.

== See also ==
- Chestnut Ridge Historical Area
- East Ridge Historical Area
- Ellis Drive Historical Area
