= Chestnut Ridge Historical Area =

Coordinates: 42°23′20.59″N 72°31′44.38″W

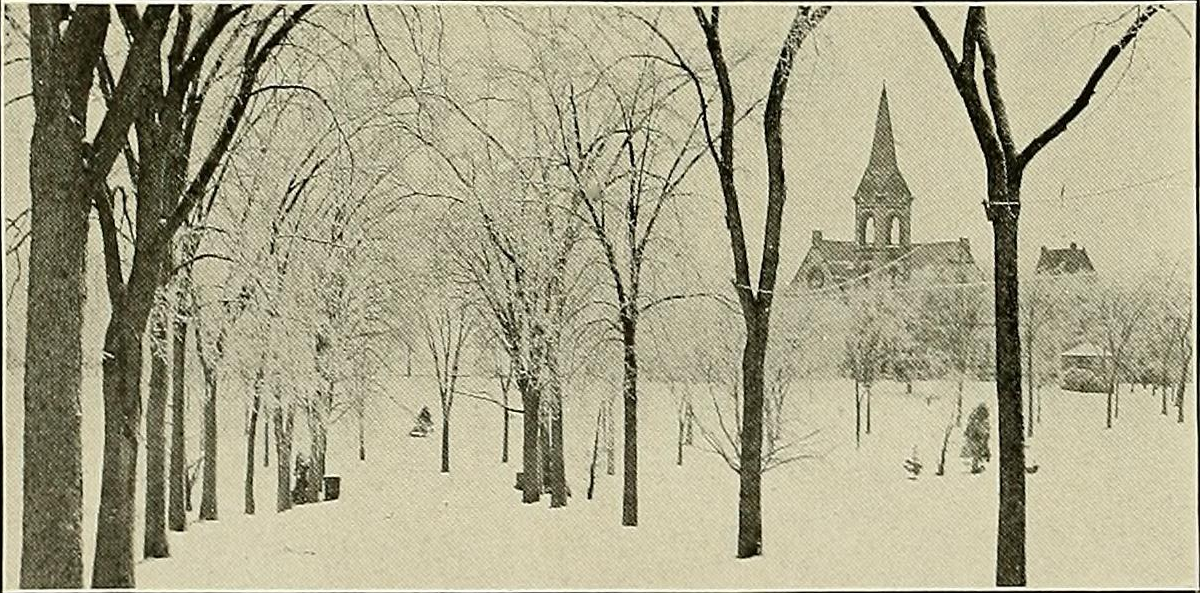
Chestnut Ridge in winter, circa 1911. The elms of Olmsted Road, with the Chapel and South College visible in the background.

The Chestnut Ridge Historical Area contains a number of the oldest buildings on the University of Massachusetts Amherst campus in the United States, including its iconic chapel, the campus war memorial, the W. E. B. Du Bois Library and the last remaining barn from the founding years of the Massachusetts Agricultural College.

== Historical buildings ==
- Blaisdell House
- Curry Hicks Cage
- Goodell Hall
- Grinnell Hall
- Horse Barn
- Memorial Hall
- Munson Hall
  - Munson Annex
- Old Chapel
- South College

== Other buildings ==
- Bartlett Hall
- Fine Arts Center
- Machmer Hall
- Student Union
- Thompson Hall
- Tobin Hall
- W. E. B. Du Bois Library

== Former buildings ==
- Dairy Barn Complex
- Liberal Arts Annex
- North College
