= University of Massachusetts Amherst College of Social and Behavioral Sciences =

School at the University of Massachusetts Amherst

Coordinates: 42°23′32.2″N 72°31′42.1″W

College of Social and Behavioral Sciences
- Public constituent college
- University of Massachusetts Amherst
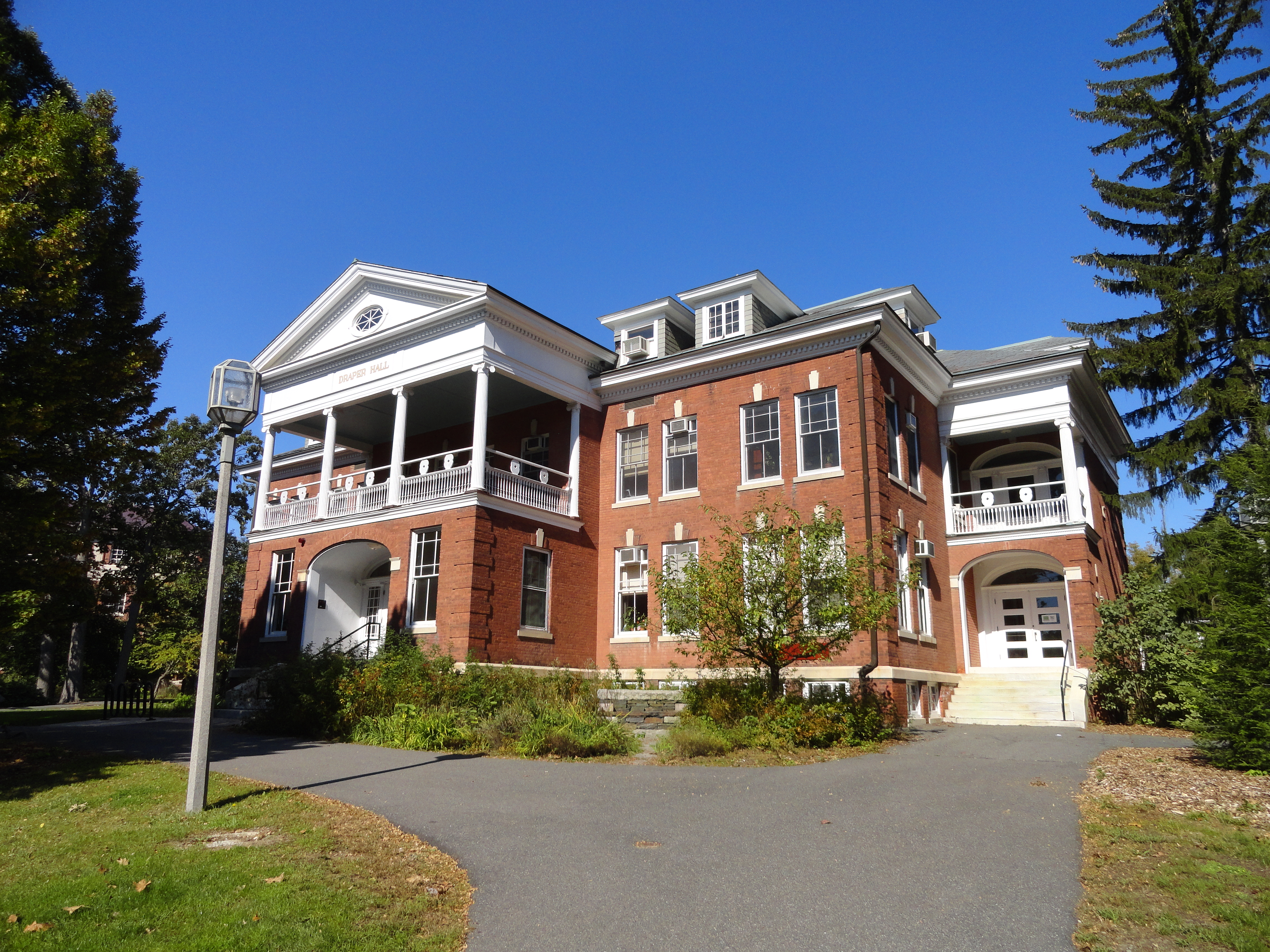
- James Draper Hall

- Logo
- Location: 40 Campus Center Way, Amherst, Massachusetts
- Abbreviation: SBS
- Colors
- Gender: Co-educational
- Dean: R. Karl Rethemeyer
- Website: http://www.umass.edu/sbs/

The College of Social and Behavioral Sciences (SBS) at the University of Massachusetts Amherst is home to the School of Public Policy as well as nine academic departments offering 13 undergraduate majors, 11 areas of Master's and doctoral study, and a number of graduate certificate programs. The college bridges science and liberal arts, encouraging students to pursue cross-disciplinary studies, take classes outside their chosen major, and participate in research projects with faculty mentors.

As of 2023, SBS enrolled 3,591 students with a student/professor ratio of 16:1.

== Advising Services ==
Academic advising, career counseling, and internship opportunities for SBS students are provided by the SBS Pathways Center located in Thompson Hall.

=== SBS RISE ===
SBS RISE (Remedying Inequity through Student Engagement) is an SBS Pathways community providing specialized resources for SBS students who identify as first-generation, Black, Indigenous, or other Persons of Color (BIPOC), and/or come from low-income backgrounds.

== Undergraduate Majors ==
- Anthropology
- Communication
- Economics
- Journalism
- Landscape Architecture
- Legal Studies
- Managerial Economics
- Political Science
- Public Policy
- Resource Economics
- Social Thought & Political Economy
- Sociology
- Sustainable Community Development

== Certificate Programs ==
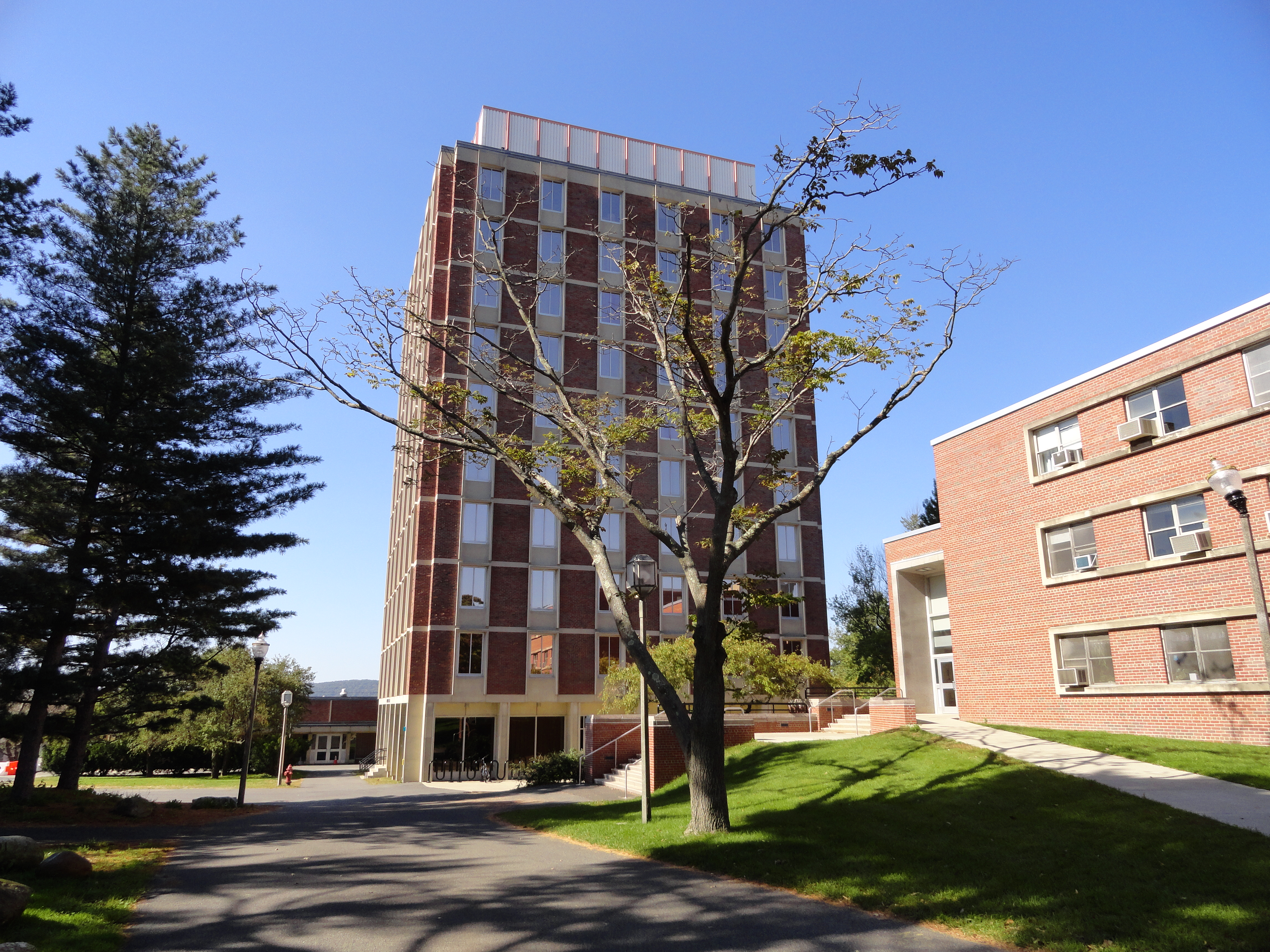
Thompson Hall where SBS offices are located.

- Applied Economic Research on Cooperative Enterprises
- Climate Change, Hazards, and Green Infrastructure Planning
- Criminology and the Criminal Justice System
- Cultural Landscape Management
- Data Analytics and Computational Social Science
- Ethnographic Research
- International Relations
- Journalism
- Latin American, Caribbean, and Latino Studies
- Legal Studies
- Media Literacy
- Political Economy
- Political Science
- Population Studies
- Public Policy and Administration
- Social Research Analysis
- Social Work and Social Welfare

== Graduate Programs ==
- Anthropology (MA, PhD)
- Communication (PhD)
- Data Analytics and Computational Social Science (MS)
- Economics (MA, PhD)
- Labor Studies (MS)
- Landscape Architecture (MLA)
- Political Science (MA, PhD)
- Regional Planning (MRP, PhD)
- Resource Economics (MS, PhD)
- Public Policy (MPA, MPPA)
- Sociology (PhD)
