= Robert C. Holub =

American academic administrator (1949–2023)

Robert Charles Holub

10th Chancellor of the University of Massachusetts Amherst
- In office July 2008 – August 2012
- Preceded by: John V. Lombardi
- Succeeded by: Kumble R. Subbaswamy

Personal details
- Born: August 22, 1949 Neptune Township, New Jersey, U.S.
- Died: August 27, 2023 (aged 74) Worthington, Ohio, U.S.
- Spouse: Sabine Holub
- Education: University of Pennsylvania (BS); University of Wisconsin-Madison (MA, PhD)
- Occupation: University Professor; University Provost; University Chancellor

Robert C. Holub (August 22, 1949 – August 27, 2023) was an American germanist, university professor and administrator. He served as chancellor of the University of Massachusetts Amherst (UMass) from August 2008 to June 2012.

== Early life and education ==
Born in Neptune Township, New Jersey, Holub was raised in Belmar, New Jersey, and attended Asbury Park High School. He became the first member of his family to attend college. Holub received his bachelor's degree in natural science from the University of Pennsylvania in 1971, going on to earn master's degrees in comparative literature (in 1973) and German (in 1976) and a Ph.D. in German (1979) from the University of Wisconsin-Madison.

== Academic appointments ==
Serving as a professor of German at the University of California-Berkeley (full professor from 1989 on), he became a leading scholar of 19th- and 20th-century German intellectual, cultural, and literary history. At Berkeley, he also served as the undergraduate dean, college of letters and science from 2003 to 2006, before taking the position of provost and vice chancellor for academic affairs at the University of Tennessee, which he held from 2006 to 2008 before taking the chancellor position at UMass.

== Death ==
Robert C. Holub died on August 27, 2023, at the age of 74.

== Publications ==
- Heinrich Heine’s Reception of German Grecophilia: The Function and Application of the Hellenic Tradition in the First Half of the Nineteenth Century (Heidelberg: Universitätsverlag Carl Winter, 1981).
- Reception Theory: A Critical Introduction (London and York: Methuen, 1984).
- Reflections of Realism: Paradox, Norm, and Ideology in Nineteenth-Century German Prose (Detroit: Wayne State University Press, 1991).
- Jürgen Habermas: Critic in the Public Sphere (London: Routledge, 1991).
- Crossing Borders: Reception Theory, Poststructuralism, Deconstruction (Madison: University of Wisconsin Press, 1992).
- Friedrich Nietzsche (New York: Twayne Publishers, 1995).
- Nietzsche’s Jewish Problem: Between Anti-Semitism and Anti-Judaism (Princeton and Oxford: Princeton University Press, 2016).
- Nietzsche in the Nineteenth Century: Social Questions and Philosophical Interventions (University of Pennsylvania Press, 2018).

Academic offices
Preceded by John V. Lombardi	Chancellor of University of Massachusetts Amherst; July 2008 – August 2012	Succeeded by Kumble R. Subbaswamy
