= Helena Theresa Goessmann =

American lecturer, academician and writer

Helena Theresa Francesca Goessmann
- Born: Helena Theresa Francesca Goessmann; 1868; Syracuse, New York, U.S.
- Died: 1926 (aged 57–58)
- Education: Ohio University
- Occupations: lecturer, academic, writer
- Writing career
- Period: fl. 1890s-1900s

Helena Theresa Goessmann (1868–1926) was an American lecturer, academic, and writer. During the course of 12 years, she gave over 1,000 lectures and talks on historical, educational, literary, and ethical subjects, in the US, including a period of four months in the winter of 1906, when she delivered in the leading Catholic girls' academies, between New York City, Saint Paul, Minnesota, Omaha, Nebraska, and New Orleans, Louisiana, a course, aggregating 125 lectures, on the "Ethics of Scholarship and Education Today". Goessmann served as the head of the department of History, Notre Dame College, Baltimore and professor of English at State College of Massachusetts (now University of Massachusetts Amherst). She was actively identified with various social, literary, and religious organizations, in Amherst, Massachusetts, Baltimore, Maryland, and New York.

== Early years and education ==
Helena Theresa Francesca Goessmann was born in Syracuse, New York, 1868. She was the daughter of Charles Anthony Goessmann, Ph. D., LL. D., and Mary Anne Claire (Kinney) Goessmann. Her father had been for many years professor of chemistry in the State College of Massachusetts (Amherst College) and director of the Lawrence Experiment Station. On her paternal side, she descended from a prominent Hessian family, and on her maternal side, from Irish ancestry. Both parents were devout Catholics.

In her infancy, the family removed to the college town of Amherst. Goessmann received her early education in private schools, while a special course of study in history, literature, and German was pursued with her father. In 1887, (Note: 1885 is also noted.) she finished a four years' course and received graduate honors from the Convent of the Sacred Heart, Elmhurst, Providence, Rhode Island. During the period of 1887–91, she was a spl. student in Boston and New York City. In June, 1895, Goessmann received the degree of Master of Philosophy from Ohio University. She studied engineering in France and Germany, 1899–1901.

== Career ==
Goessmann's special interest was historical research and ethics, with lecturing in these fields. She delivered a series of historical lectures to her alma mater in the winter of 1891–92. Since then, she appeared before several literary organizations of the East Coast. She published a volume of poems, "A Score of Songs"; and "The Christian Woman in Philanthropy" was the first of an ethical series. She also contributed regularly to the press. Her articles appeared in the "Catholic World Reading Circle Review" and other publications. Her papers at the World's Columbian Exposition/World's Congress of Representative Women in Chicago, and the Atlanta Exposition were well received.

She lectured in New Orleans, 1895; lectured in course at Catholic Summer School sessions of 1892, 1893, 1894, 1896, 1897; and was frequently called upon to address leading non-Catholic organizations on education and culture, in New England. Goessmann gave over 1,000 lectures and talks on historical, educational, literary, and ethical subjects, in the United States, including a period of four months in the winter of 1906, when she delivered in the leading Catholic girls' academies, between New York, St. Paul, Omaha, and New Orleans, a course, aggregating 125 lectures, on the Ethics of Scholarship and Education Today.

Goessmann served as the head, department of history, Notre Dame College (now Notre Dame of Maryland University), Baltimore, 1897-9; head, department of Catholic higher education, New York, 1904–08; and professor, English literature, Massachusetts Agricultural College. She was elected, after the death of her father, as Professor of English, State College of Massachusetts, Amherst. She was the author of "A Score of Songs", 1887; "Christian Women in Philanthropy", 1895; "Christian Women in Society", 1895. She was a general contributor to US press and magazines, but the public was reached chiefly through her lectures. She traveled in the US, Canada, and Europe.

Goessmann was president of the Tuesday Club, Amherst, 1892–96; secretary and on advisory board Amherst Women's Club, 1891–93; organizer and first president of women's auxiliary, Catholic Summer School, Cliff Haven, New York, 1895–98; member of Woman's Literary Club and Alumnae Club, Baltimore, 1896–99; organizer and first president of Elmhurst (Sacred Heart) Alumna Association, 1900–03. She was the head of the department of history, Notre Dame College, Baltimore, 1897–99; a member of the United States Catholic Historical Society, 1909; member and chairman of Philothea Society, New York, 1906–07; and head of Department of Catholic Higher Education, New York, 1904–07.

She died in 1926.

== Selected works ==
- A Score of Songs, 1887
- Christian Women in Philanthropy, 1895
- Christian Women in Society, 1895
