= List of commissioners of the Massachusetts Department of Agricultural Resources =

Following the establishment of the Massachusetts State Board of Agriculture in 1852, 24 individuals have served as the head of this institution, which has since been known as the Massachusetts Department of Food and Agriculture and presently the Massachusetts Department of Agricultural Resources.

== List of secretaries and commissioners ==
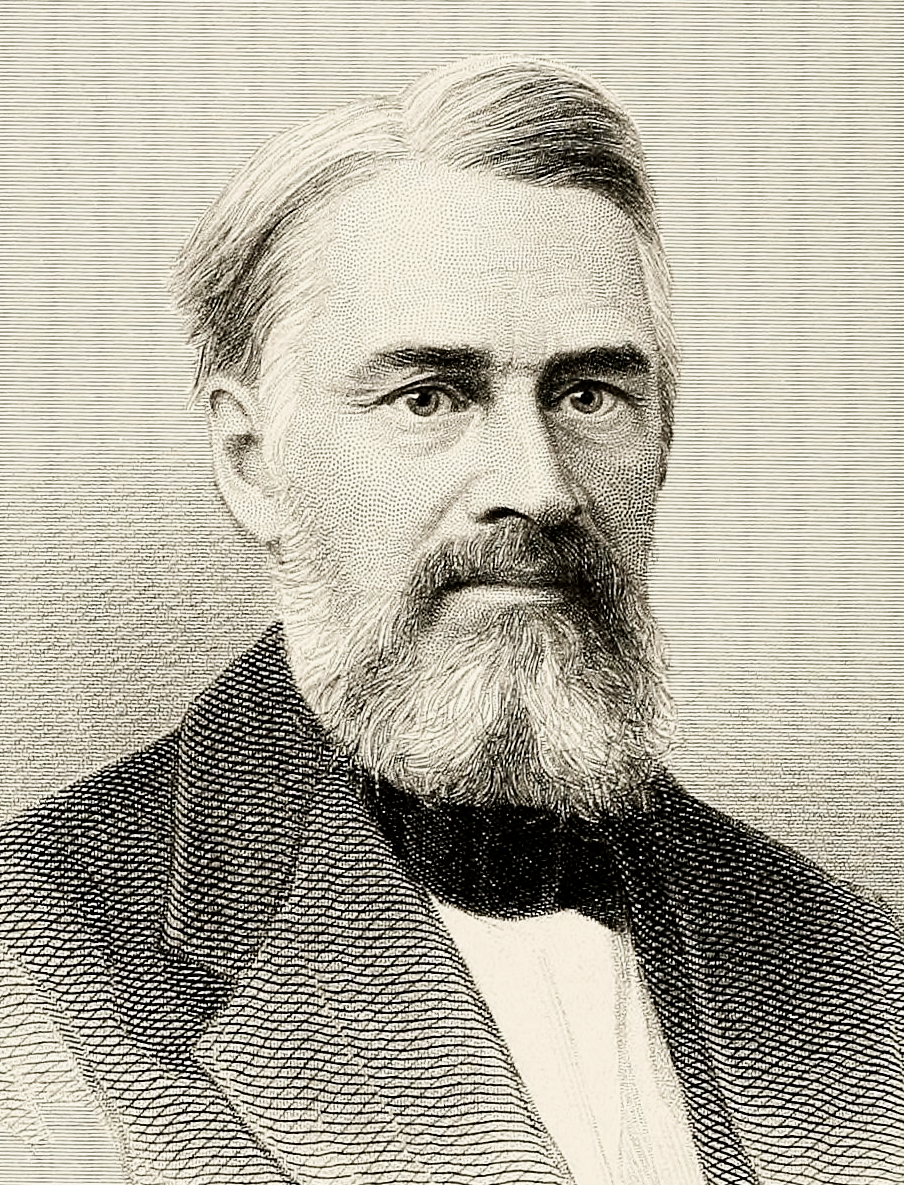
Charles L. Flint, first and longest serving head of the Massachusetts State Board of Agriculture

=== Secretaries of the Massachusetts Board of Agriculture ===
- Charles L. Flint (1852-1880)
- John E. Russell (1881-1887)
- William R. Sessions (1888-1899)
- James W. Stockwell (1899-1903)
- J. Lewis Ellsworth (1903-1913)
- Wilfrid Wheeler (1913-1919)

=== Commissioners of the Massachusetts Department of Agriculture Resources ===
- Wilfrid Wheeler (1919-1920)
- Arthur Gilbert (1921-1933)
- Edgar Gillette (1934-1937)
- William Casey (1938-1941)
- Louis Webster (1941-1945)
- Frederick Cole (1945-1948)
- John Chander (1948-1951)
- Henry Broderick (1951-1954)
- Roy Hawes (1954-1958)
- Charles McNamara (1958-1968)
- Nathan Chandler (1969-1975)
- Frederic Winthrop (1975-1984)
- August Schumacher Jr. (1985-1990)
- Gregory C. Watson (1990-1993)
- Jonathan Healy (1993-2002)
- Douglas P. Gillespie (2002-2007)
- Douglas W. Petersen (2008-2009)
- Scott J. Soares (2009-2012)
- Gregory C. Watson (2012-2015)
- John Lebeaux (2015–present)
