= Marcellette G. Williams =

American academic administrator

8th Chancellor of the University of Massachusetts Amherst
- In office July 2001 – July 2002
- Preceded by: David K. Scott
- Succeeded by: John V. Lombardi

Personal details
- Education: Michigan State University
- Occupation: Academic administrator University Chancellor

Marcellette ("Marci") Gaillard-Gay Williams is an American retired academic administrator who served as interim chancellor of the University of Massachusetts Amherst from July 2001 until July 2002. She was the university's eighth chancellor and the first woman to serve in the position.

Williams previously served as an administrator at Michigan State University and was recruited to UMass as deputy chancellor in 1994 by her predecessor in the position, David K. Scott. Her chancellorship came at a tumultuous time—amid the September 11 terrorist attacks in which a UMass IT employee was killed, a deep round of budget cuts imposed by the state, and a successful union vote by resident assistants at UMass Amherst.

Williams later served as a senior leader in the University of Massachusetts system office. She retired from a 53-year career in higher education in July 2019.

The Dr. Marcellette G. Williams Distinguished Scholars program at the UMass Chan Medical School is named for her.

== Early career ==
Williams graduated in 1968 with a bachelor's degree in comparative literature from Michigan State University, where she was inducted into Phi Beta Kappa. She earned her master's degree in English and comparative literature and a doctorate's in English from Michigan State. This led to a teaching position in the university's English department in 1981.

Williams at one time served as acting chair of Michigan State's English Department. In 1986, she was named the department's associate chairperson of undergraduate programs. Williams also spent a decade consulting and teaching in Europe and Asia through Michigan State's Graduate Studies in Education Overseas program.

Williams was an American Council on Education fellow in 1998-99, having previously served as a nominator and mentor in the program.

Williams held other administrative roles at Michigan State in the 1990s before being named executive assistant to the president and corporate secretary to the board of trustees.

In 1994, UMass Amherst recruited Williams and her husband, Keith, a French professor and Michigan State administrator.

== UMass Amherst ==
Williams was hired into the newly created position of deputy chancellor at UMass Amherst in 1994 by Chancellor David K. Scott. The two knew each other at Michigan State, where Scott's career included turns as a professor, director for research at the National Superconducting Cyclotron Laboratory, provost, and vice president for academic affairs before his departure for UMass in 1993.

Williams later said she was not looking to leave Michigan State but was recruited by Scott and motivated by her research into the history of UMass Amherst and her "passion for public land-grant universities," established in 1862 for the purpose of expanding educational opportunities to the public.

Controversy surrounding her appointment focused on the fact that Scott created a new position during a period of budget constraints at the university, including a hiring freeze. Her husband, Keith, was hired at the same time as associate vice chancellor for university advancement. Criticism of the two hirings was lodged by the president of the Student Government Association and the president of Service Employees International Union Local 509, which represents the university's professional staff.

There was also controversy related to consulting fees paid to Williams and her husband by UMass Amherst while both were still employed at Michigan State. Scott took blame for those payments, of $7,500 each. He told The Associated Press, "I was eager to have their advice and input" on affairs at UMass." Scott cancelled the five-month consulting contracts, and Williamses returned the $15,000 in fees. The Williamses issued a statement expressing their "commitment of working for the continued growth of this fine institution. We hope that with the recession of the consulting contracts we can continue to focus on our jobs."

As deputy chancellor of UMass Amherst, Williams' responsibilities included planning, budgets, resource management, property management, athletics and IT. During her time in the position, a major technology upgrade networked campus buildings, expanded server capacity and implemented a student information system. Asked about her greatest achievement in seven years in the role, Williams in an August 2021 interview cited the technology upgrade that eventually provided equal access to computer technology to everyone on campus. Williams also served as a liaison between the campus and the UMass president's office.

During her tenure as deputy chancellor, Williams was prompted by a controversial appearance by Nation of Islam leader Louis Farrakhan in March 1994 to coordinate an event the following year to explore issues of race and difference. Held in March 1995, that event featured a conversation between poet Maya Angelou and Holocaust survivor and author Elie Wiesel before an audience of 5,000 at the Mullins Center, where Wiesel told students he and Angelou had both chosen "the written word as a means of bringing people together." During an August 2021 interview, following her retirement, Williams said that Wiesel had been due to return to New York City that evening by a car arranged by UMass but changed his schedule at the last minute to have dinner with Angelou at the Lord Jeffrey Inn in Amherst, where the two continued their conversation. Wiesel and Angelou subsequently made appearances together on several other university campuses.

Williams organized a 1996 "crossworld conversation" at UMass featuring a discussion between openly bisexual tennis star Martina Navratilova and former baseball umpire Dave Pollone, who is gay; a 1997 conversation between Coretta Scott-King and Congresswoman Pat Schroeder; and a November 2021 appearance by Peter and Linda Biehl, who founded the Amy Biehl Foundation Trust to empower youth in South African townships following their daughter's murder at the hands of a mob in the township of Gugulethu, outside Cape Town, on August 25, 1993. Williams has said she wanted UMass students to "have an opportunity to meet people who really lived their values."

In March 1997, Williams represented the university in negotiations with a group of 150 to 200 students who occupied the Goodell administration building and whose demands included increased enrollment of minority students, more minority faculty and several new academic departments. The African, Latin, Asian and Native American student association (ALANA) led the protest, which lasted nearly a week. At the time 16 percent of UMass Amherst undergraduates were minority students. Williams led negotiations in the absence of Chancellor David K. Scott, who was vacationing in Mexico. The protest ended in an agreement recommitting UMass to enrollment goals for minority students, as well as a pledge to a more diverse faculty. Some demands were not met, including one seeking free child care for students, though the university promised a task force to study the issue.

While at UMass Amherst, Williams was also a professor of English and comparative literature. Her research interests include the language of leadership, such as metaphor and rhetoric, and its use to persuade and motivate.

=== Chancellorship ===
The UMass Board of Trustees voted on Feb. 7, 2001, to ratify Williams as the university's interim chancellor, succeeding David K. Scott. She was the first woman to hold the position.

As chancellor, Williams led the UMass Amherst campus during the 9/11 terrorist attacks on New York City and Washington, D.C. She has described being called out of a budget meeting when it was discovered that a UMass employee — Christoffer M. Carstanjen, 33, a computer research specialist in the Office of Information Technologies — was a passenger on an airline flight that crashed into the World Trade Center in Manhattan. She later discovered the much broader scope of the terrorist attacks, which killed at least nine UMass Amherst alumni.

Williams spent much of that day attending to communications, logistics and support of the campus while under the impression one of her brothers was a passenger on one of the hijacked flights. As it turned out, he was not.

In January 2002, a round of mid-year budget cuts by the state forced the UMass system to make immediate cuts. The UMass Amherst campus eliminated more than 90 positions. Williams later said she made it a point to hold meetings with the longest serving staff members who lost their jobs as part of those cuts so they could hear the news directly from her. "That was one of the horrific days," she told an interviewer of her tenure as chancellor.

Williams presided over a total of $17 million in budget cuts. They included elimination of seven varsity sports. The successful men's water polo team was among them, despite seven conference championships in nine years and seven NCAA Final Four appearances. Other programs eliminated were women's volleyball, women's water polo, women's and men's gymnastics, men's tennis and men's indoor track and field. The Athletic Department cuts alone saved $1.1 million annually, affecting 136 student athletes. After the cuts, UMass Amherst continued funding of 22 intercollegiate sports.

Resident assistants in UMass Amherst dorms voted to unionize in March 2002, creating what The Boston Globe called the country's first union of undergraduate dorm monitors. A union official hailed the 138-88 vote in favor of joining the United Auto Workers as the beginning of a national movement by dorm monitors. At UMass, the union campaign galvanized around the firing of two campus RAs two years earlier. Administrators campaigned against the union drive for a year, suggesting the RA program might be eliminated if the drive was successful, according to The Boston Globe. Williams wrote in a letter to the 360 RAs on campus prior to the vote: "Collective bargaining with an outside entity will, in my view, inevitably collide with core educational and administrative decisions. … The university simply cannot and will not bargain with an outside union about these core decisions."

== UMass president's office ==
After serving as chancellor of UMass Amherst, Williams asked not to be considered for the interim presidency of the five-campus system, citing family reasons. Instead, UMass trustees selected Jack M. Wilson, who was later named permanent president.

Wilson recruited Williams to the president's office, where she served as senior vice president for academic affairs, student affairs and international relations, starting in the summer of 2005. After 13 years in that role, she spent a year as vice president and senior executive associate for international strategy before her retirement from a 53-year career in July 2019.

In 2015, Williams in her capacity as senior vice president served on the selection committee for a successor to Marty Meehan as chancellor of UMass Lowell after Meehan had been named president of the UMass system. The committee nominated Jacqueline Moloney, who was executive vice chancellor of the Lowell campus and became the first woman to lead UMass Lowell.

In February 2017, Williams filed a legal briefing on behalf of the UMass system supporting Massachusetts Attorney General Maura Healey's lawsuit to block a Trump administration order barring citizens of seven countries — Syria, Iraq, Iran, Somalia, Sudan, Libya and Yemen — from entering the United States. Williams' brief noted the order affected 300 UMass students and 160 employees from those countries. She added that many faculty, who are legal permanent U.S. residents, cancelled plans for trips overseas due to the order. Her briefing argued that the order had "a significant negative impact on the ability to UMass to operate its core business: education and research." The U.S. Supreme Court subsequently upheld the travel ban.

In April 2021, Williams was named to the committee that sought a chancellor for UMass Dartmouth. The committee nominated Mark Fuller, former dean of the Isenberg School of Management at UMass Amherst, who had been serving as interim chancellor of the Dartmouth campus.

== Community service ==
Williams was active in professional groups and community organizations throughout her career in higher education. She has served as an elected and appointed director for public interest, economic and media organizations, as well as foundations — including the Amy Biehl Foundation Trust.

Williams taught in the educational opportunity program Upward Bound. She was also involved in Community Volunteers for International Programs.

== Medical school scholars ==
In October 2018, the UMass Chan Medical School honored Williams by creating a faculty honor in her name. The Dr. Marcellette G. Williams Distinguished Scholars program recognizes medical school faculty whose work earns national distinction. The mid-career faculty are selected on the basis of scholarship as well as anticipated innovation. Honorees receive $60,000 in annual funding for five years to support their academic work.
