= Charles Anthony Goessmann =

American chemist (1827–1910)

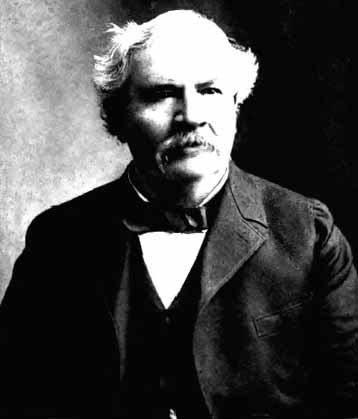
- Born: June 13, 1827; Naumburg, Province of Saxony, Kingdom of Prussia, German Confederation (now in Saxony-Anhalt, Germany)
- Died: September 1, 1910 (aged 83); Amherst, Massachusetts, USA
- Education: University of Göttingen
- Children: Helena Theresa Goessmann
- Scientific career
- Fields: Chemist (food and agriculture)
- Workplaces: Rensselaer Polytechnic Institute; University of Massachusetts Amherst

Charles Anthony Goessmann (13 June 1827 – 1 September 1910), known in his native German as Karl Anton Gößmann, was a Massachusetts agricultural and food chemist.

== Biography ==
=== Education ===
Goessmann was born in Naumburg, Germany. He was educated at the gymnasium in Fritzlar. After leaving the gymnasium, he became an apprentice pharmacist, and worked as an assistant pharmacist in several towns. He studied under Friedrich Wöhler in the University of Göttingen, where he received the degree of Ph.D. in 1853. From 1852 until 1857, he was assistant in the chemical laboratory, and privatdocent in the university. During this time, he studied the peanut.

=== United States ===
One of Goessmann's students at Göttingen was J. H. Eastwick, and in 1857 Goessmann came to the United States as chemist and manager of the Eastwick Bros. sugar refinery in Philadelphia. He remained in that position until 1861. He was then chemist of the Onondaga Salt Company, 1862 to 1869, engaged in the development of the salt industry in New York and Michigan. In 1862, he became professor of chemistry in the Rensselaer Polytechnic Institute in Troy, New York, but resigned that chair after two years.

=== Massachusetts ===
William S. Clark, president of the Massachusetts Agricultural College, had also been one of Goessmann's students at Göttingen, and in 1869 Goessmann was appointed professor of chemistry at MAC. His research focused on the chemistry of crops and agricultural soils. In addition to his professorship, he was chemist to the Massachusetts Board of Agriculture in 1873, director of the Massachusetts Agricultural Experiment Station in 1882, and analyst of the Massachusetts Board of Health in 1883. In 1873, he got a law passed for accurate fertilizer labeling.

He was the first president of the American Association of Agricultural Chemists. On his retirement in 1907, he received a Carnegie pension. He died in Amherst, Massachusetts, leaving a widow, Mary Anna Clara Kinny Goessmann, whom he had married on 22 October 1862, and five children.

He has a building named after him at UMass Amherst, Goessmann Hall, which is the main chemical engineering building on campus.

== Works ==
His contributions to chemical literature were numerous, and include, prior to his coming to the United States, papers on organic acids contributed to the Annalen der Chemie und Pharmacie. Goessmann's later papers include articles on sugar, salt, various foods, and special fertilization of plants. These appeared chiefly in the reports of the organizations with which he was connected. Selections from his works:

- Chemical Composition of the Brines of Onondaga (1862)
- Brines of Michigan (1862–63)
- Best Mode of Manufacturing Coarse or Solar Salt from the Brines of Onondaga (1863)
- Mineral Springs of Onondaga (1866)
- Salt Deposits of Petite Anse, La. (1867)
- Salt Resources of Goderich, Canada (1868)
- Application of Caustic Magnesia for Sugar Refining (1864)
- Manufacture of Sugar in Cuba (1865)
- Justus von Liebig's Annalen der Chemie (vols. lxxxvi., lxxxix., xc, xci., xciii., xciv., xcvii., xcviii., xcix., c, ci., civ.)
- Benjamin Silliman's American Journal of Science (vols. xliv. and xlix.)
- Reports of the New York Board of Agriculture
- Reports of the Massachusetts Board of Agriculture
- Transactions of the New York Agricultural Society
- Reports of the Trustees of the Massachusetts Agricultural College
