= Charles S. Chapin =

American educator (1859–1924)

Charles Sumner Chapin (October 19, 1859 – March 21, 1924) was an American educator who was principal of the Westfield State Normal School (1896–1901), Rhode Island State Normal School (1901–1907), and the New Jersey State Normal School at Montclair (1908–1924).

== Biography ==
Chapin was born on October 19, 1859 in Westfield, Massachusetts. He was the son of Rev. Daniel E. Chapin and a direct descendant of Samuel Chapin, one of the first European settlers of Springfield, Massachusetts. He was valedictorian of the class at 1876 at Worcester Classical High School and graduated at the top of his class at Wesleyan University in 1880.

After graduating, he became the principal of Brookfield High School in Brookfield, Connecticut. From 1882 to 1884, he was the submaster of Worcester High School. During this time, Chapin also studied law in the office of Beacon, Hopkins & Bacon. He admitted to the bar in 1884 and practiced law as an associate of John R. Thayer. He returned to education in 1886 as the assistant superintendent of schools in Middletown, Connecticut. He then served as the classic master at Hartford Public High School from 1887 to 1890, when he became the principal of Fitchburg High School in Fitchburg, Massachusetts.

On October 1, 1896, Chapin was appointed principal of the Westfield State Normal School by the Massachusetts Board of Education. He succeeded James C. Greenough, who resigned due to a faculty protest against his management that also led to the removal all of the protesting faculty. Despite the difficult circumstances he inherited, his tenure was described by the Massachusetts Board of Education as "from the first entirely successful". He served as president of the New England Normal Council in 1898 and in 1900, oversaw the opening of a new training school.

Chapin resigned from Westfield State in 1901 to take the same position at the Rhode Island State Normal School, which offered a newer facility and a higher salary. On December 3, 1907, he was appointed principal of the new state normal school in Montclair, New Jersey. He was given control over the selection of the entire teaching staff and organization of the faculty. He took office on July 1, 1908. He remained president until his death on March 21, 1924 in Atlantic City, New Jersey.

Academic offices
Preceded by James C. Greenough	Principal of Westfield State Normal School; 1896–1901	Succeeded by Clarence A. Brodeur
Preceded by Fred Gowing	Principal of the Rhode Island Normal School; 1901–1908	Succeeded by John L. Alger
Preceded by Position created	Principal of the New Jersey State Normal School at Montclair; 1883–1886	Succeeded by Harry A. Sprague
