= John V. Lombardi =

American academic (born 1942)

25th President of Louisiana State University
- In office 2007–2012
- Preceded by: William Jenkins
- Succeeded by: F. King Alexander

9th Chancellor of the University of Massachusetts Amherst
- In office 2002–2007
- Preceded by: Marcellette G. Williams
- Succeeded by: Robert C. Holub

9th President of the University of Florida
- In office 1990–1999
- Preceded by: Marshall Criser
- Succeeded by: Charles E. Young

Personal details
- Born: August 19, 1942 (age 84) Los Angeles, California, U.S.
- Spouse: Cathryn Lee Lombardi
- Education: B.A., Pomona College, 1963; M.A., Columbia University, 1964; Ph.D., Columbia University, 1968
- Occupation: Professor; University executive

Academic background
- Thesis: The decline and abolition of negro slavery in Venezuela (1820-1854) (1968)

Academic work
- Discipline: Latin American history
- Institutions: Indiana University; Johns Hopkins University; University of Florida; University of Massachusetts Amherst; Louisiana State University

John Vincent Paul Maher Lombardi (born August 19, 1942) is an American professor and former university administrator. He is a native of California, and earned his bachelor's, master's and doctoral degrees before becoming a professor of Latin American history. Lombardi has served as the president of the University of Florida, the chancellor of the University of Massachusetts Amherst, and the president of the Louisiana State University System.

== Early life and education ==
Lombardi was born into a family of educators in Los Angeles, California in 1942. His father was the president of Los Angeles City College, a California community college, and superintendent of the Los Angeles Community College District. His mother worked as a college librarian. He earned his Bachelor of Arts degree from Pomona College in Claremont, California in 1963, and his Master of Arts and doctor of philosophy degrees from Columbia University in New York City in 1964 and 1968, respectively. He also attended the Universidad Nacional Autónoma de México in Mexico City, where he learned Spanish while living with a Mexican family, as an undergraduate, and the University of California, Los Angeles for graduate school. While he was a graduate student, Lombardi spent several years living and researching in Venezuela as a Fulbright Scholar.

Lombardi married the former Cathryn L. Lee in 1964, whom he met while they were attending Pomona College. They have two children: son John Lee Lombardi and daughter Mary Ann Lombardi.

== Early academic appointments ==
Lombardi taught in the history department at Indiana University, first at the Jeffersonville, Indiana branch campus and then at the main campus in Bloomington, Indiana, from 1967 through 1987. At Indiana, he held various administrative posts, including director of Latin American studies, dean of international programs, and dean of arts and sciences. He served as the provost and vice president for academic affairs at Johns Hopkins University in Baltimore, Maryland from 1987 through 1990. As the provost of Johns Hopkins, Lombardi played a key role in fund-raising and in resolving a financial crisis in which the university was then embroiled.

Lombardi is a specialist in Latin American history, and has a particular interest in Venezuela. He has written numerous academic journal articles and several books on Venezuela and Latin American history and affairs, as well as on many university administration-related subjects. He is a nationally recognized authority on American higher education, and has been the co-editor of the annual editions of The Top American Research Universities from 2000 to the present. In addition to Latin American history classes, he has taught courses on intercollegiate sports, international business and university management.

== University of Florida ==
Lombardi served as the ninth president of the University of Florida located in Gainesville, Florida, from 1990 to 1999. He was barely settled in his job at the beginning of the fall 1990 semester when Lombardi was confronted by one of the most serious crises in the university's history—the horrific murders of five students by serial killer Danny Rolling. He is remembered as both comforter-in-chief and as a "student's president" during his term as president. As part of his athletics reform agenda, Lombardi created the Committee on Intercollegiate Athletics, which ultimately removed responsibility for student-athlete academics from the control of the University Athletic Association (UAA) and placed it under the control of the committee. Lombardi actively reinserted the office of the president in the UAA's chain of decision-making; the president retained final authority over all major decisions. He implemented further institutional controls intended to promote the welfare and academic achievement of student-athletes and continued compliance with the rules of the National Collegiate Athletic Association (NCAA). Lombardi was also responsible for the selection of Jeremy Foley as the new athletic director in 1992, now recognized as one of the most successful athletic directors in NCAA Division I sports. His relationships with the Florida Board of Regents and the Florida Legislature were characterized by a series of ups and downs, confrontation followed by conciliation, usually involving conflicts over declining state financial support and conflicting state education funding priorities of the legislature. Lombardi resigned as president in 1999, but continued to teach as a member of the history faculty until 2002.

Lombardi's enthusiasm for classic cars led him and a friend to operate Farmer's Garage, a specialty shop for older model automobiles. At the University of Florida, he is fondly remembered for driving about the Gainesville campus in an old red pickup truck.

== University of Massachusetts Amherst ==
Lombardi served as the chancellor of the University of Massachusetts Amherst from 2002 to 2007.

== Louisiana State University System ==
As president of the LSU System, Lombardi served as the chief executive officer of the five campuses, eleven institutions and ten hospitals within the system. He presided over the groundbreaking of the University Medical Center in New Orleans. He also held an appointment as a history professor at Louisiana State University. He was terminated from the position on Friday, April 27, 2012.

== Author ==
Lombardi began working with computers in 1967. A member of InfoWorld's review board, he wrote articles on information technology during his academic and administrative career, such as a review of WordPerfect for NeXTSTEP.

== See also ==
- Florida Gators
- History of the University of Florida
- List of Columbia University people
- List of Indiana University faculty
- List of Johns Hopkins University faculty
- List of Pomona College people
- List of University of Florida presidents
- Lombardi Scholars Program
- LSU Tigers
- State University System of Florida

== Bibliography ==
- Capaldi, Elizabeth D., John V. Lombardi, Craig W. Abbey & Diane D. Craig, The Top American Research Universities, The Center for Measuring University Performance, Arizona State University, Tempe, Arizona (2009).
- Pleasants, Julian M., Gator Tales: An Oral History of the University of Florida, University of Florida, Gainesville, Florida (2006). ISBN 0-8130-3054-4.
- Van Ness, Carl, & Kevin McCarthy, Honoring the Past, Shaping the Future: The University of Florida, 1853–2003, University of Florida, Gainesville, Florida (2003).
- Berardo, M. Felix, "John Lombardi". In The Italian Americans of the Twentieth Century, ed. G. Carpetto and D.M. Evanac. Loggia Press, Tampa, Florida, p. 210-11 (1999).
