= Javier Reyes =

Mexican-American university administrator

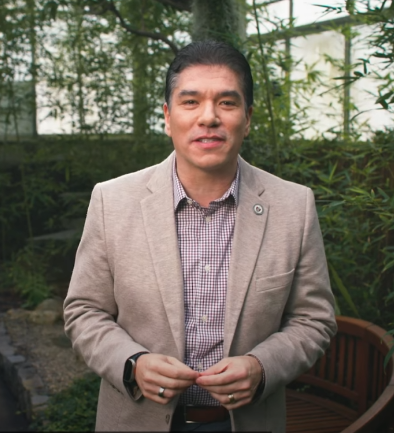
- Reyes in 2024

12th Chancellor of the University of Massachusetts Amherst
- Incumbent
- Assumed office July 1, 2023
- Preceded by: Kumble R. Subbaswamy

Chancellor of University of Illinois, Chicago
- Interim
- In office July 1, 2022 – June 30, 2023
- Preceded by: Michael Amiridis
- Succeeded by: Marie Lynn Miranda

Personal details
- Born: Javier Arturo Reyes Altamirano Mexico
- Education: Monterrey Institute of Technology and Higher Education (BA); Texas A&M University (MA, PhD)

Javier Reyes is an American economist who is the 12th and current chancellor of the University of Massachusetts Amherst, as well as Professor of Finance at Isenberg School of Management. Reyes is an economist and the first Hispanic to serve as the chancellor of UMass Amherst.

He was provost and vice chancellor for academic affairs at the University of Illinois Chicago and was later interim chancellor.

Reyes also previously served as dean of the John Chambers College of Business and Economics at West Virginia University and as vice president for the state's economic development program Startup West Virginia.

== Career ==
Reyes was born and raised in Mexico. He attended Tecnológico de Monterrey in Mexico City, where he earned his bachelor's degree in economics. He earned a Ph.D. in economics from Texas A&M University.

He joined the economics faculty of the University of Arkansas in 2003. At Arkansas, Reyes would rise to multiple high-level administrative positions at the university.

Reyes was later dean of the John Chambers College of Business and Economics at West Virginia University. He was provost at the University of Illinois Chicago (UIC) and later the interim chancellor starting in July 2022. In January 23, Reyes posted a letter to the UIC community announcing that his administration had failed to reach an agreement with the UIC United Faculty, resulting in a strike that lasted for six days and gained national attention.

On February 16, 2023, Reyes was appointed as chancellor of the University of Massachusetts Amherst; he began serving in the role in July 2023.

Following his decision to deploy Massachusetts State Police to remove an unauthorized encampment built by students participating in a protest against Israel's military invasion and occupation of Gaza, the UMass Amherst Student Government Association issued a "no confidence" vote against Chancellor Reyes on May 8, 2024. Over 130 students, faculty members and people unaffiliated with UMass were arrested the night before. This came after arresting 57 UMass students occupying the Whitmore administration building on October 25, 2023. On May 20, 2024, at the first general faculty meeting in 15 years, the faculty voted no confidence in Chancellor Reyes.

In February 2025, it was revealed that Javier Reyes interviewed and was a finalist for president of West Virginia University, despite being the chancellor of UMass Amherst for less than two years. This decision was one in a series of missteps that drew sharp rebuke from the unions and community of UMass Amherst. One associate professor from UMass Amherst remarked, “In these dark times, we need a courageous leader who will defend UMass Amherst against the ideological assault on free speech, academic integrity and public funding... If Mr. Reyes finds a job elsewhere, maybe we can find a chancellor who fits that description.”

The non-confidence votes would continue in December of 2025 when the Professional Staff Union, representing 2,400 employees on the UMass Amherst and Boston campuses, held a vote of no confidence as it related to eroding working conditions, lack of job protections, and stagnating wages, all of which became incrementally worse during his tenure. Joined by the University Staff Association's executive board who voted unanimously just a day before, PSU's membership voted 966 to 59 in support of the no-confidence resolution. Union leaders echoed the growing resentment from their membership throughout the bargaining process, which went unaddressed by the bargaining team appointed by Reyes. "We already have too many employees facing food insecurity, having trouble affording rent or a mortgage, delaying medical care, and needing to work second or third jobs,” said PSU's co-chair Andrew Gorry. “Chancellor Reyes needs to stop playing around with our salaries and settle a fair contract with us now.”

== Personal life ==
Javier Reyes is married to Maritza, and they have two sons Javi and Diego.

Academic offices
Preceded by Kumble R. Subbaswamy	13th Chancellor of University of Massachusetts Amherst; 2023–present	Incumbent
