= Draper Hall Annex =

Coordinates: 42°23′33.27″N 72°31′42.17″W

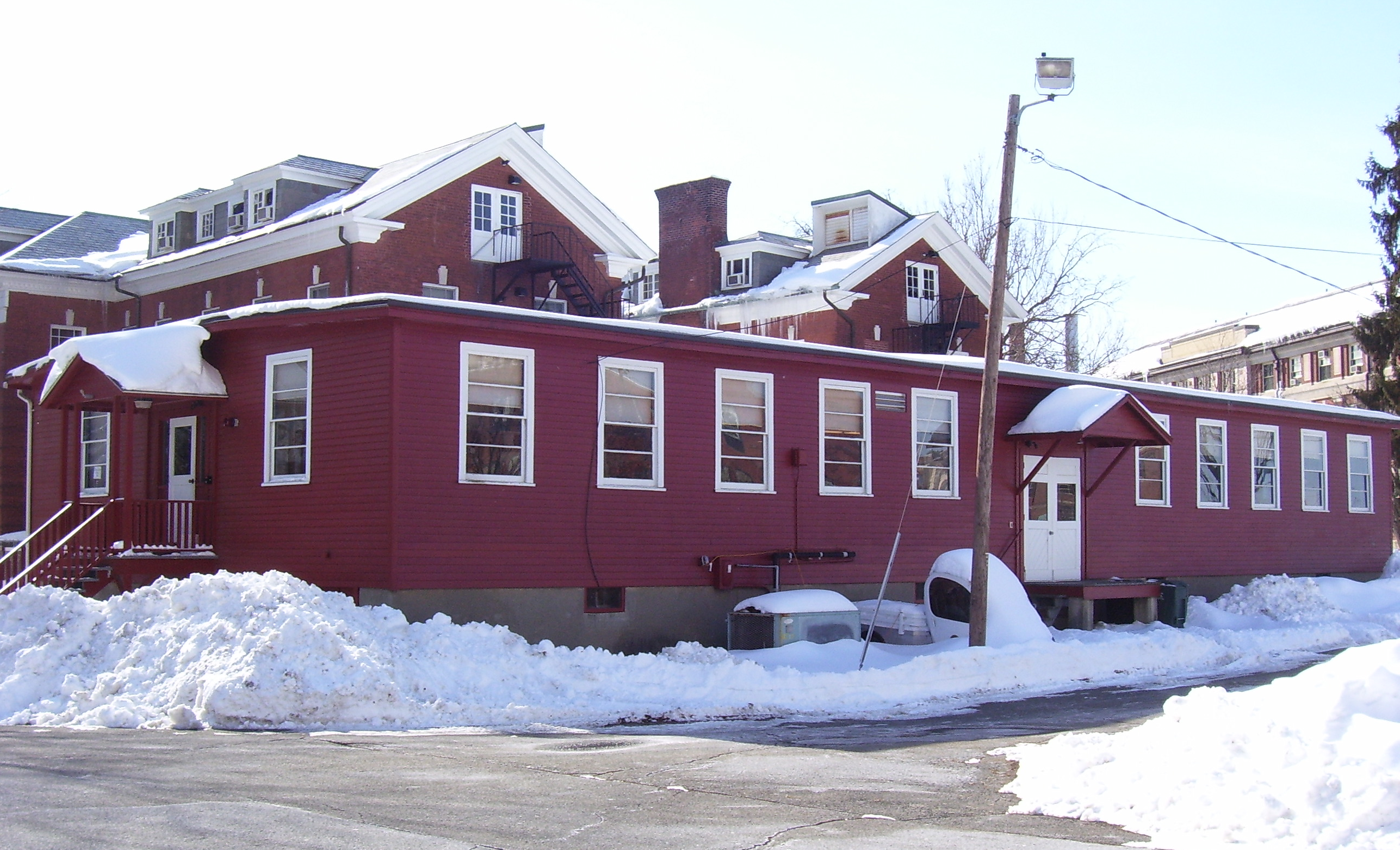
- Draper Hall Annex in 2011
- Interactive map of the Draper Hall Annex area

General information
- Type: Offices, classrooms
- Completed: 1947
- Demolished: 2025

Technical details
- Floor count: 1

The Draper Hall Annex was a single-story office building which housed emergency medical services at the University of Massachusetts Amherst. The building was adjoined to Draper Hall, and had served as office space, classrooms, and at one time, home to the university's polymer science research.

== History ==
After the second World War, UMass received an influx of applicants due to financial aid from the G.I. Bill, and in order to accommodate the growing number of students, the university had to undergo a rapid expansion in a relatively short period of time. The Draper Annex was constructed in 1947 as a result of this demand, and for a number of years would serve as additional classroom and office space for university's the business and agricultural departments.

In 1961 the building changed functions, and became the main offices for the university's Polymer Research Institute and the home of the new Department of Polymer Science and Engineering in 1974.

The annex was occupied by the Five College Radio Astronomy Observatory program in the 1970s, and for many years housed the observatory machine shop on the main floor and excess storage in the basement.

With the completion of the Silvio O. Conte National Center for Polymer Research in 1996, the department of polymer science would vacate the annex, as this new complex was capable of housing all the department's operations under one roof. Subsequently, the UMass Emergency Medical Services relocated to the building. In 2025 the building was demolished to make way for the new Sustainable Engineering Laboratory.

== See also ==
- Draper Hall
