= Flint Laboratory =

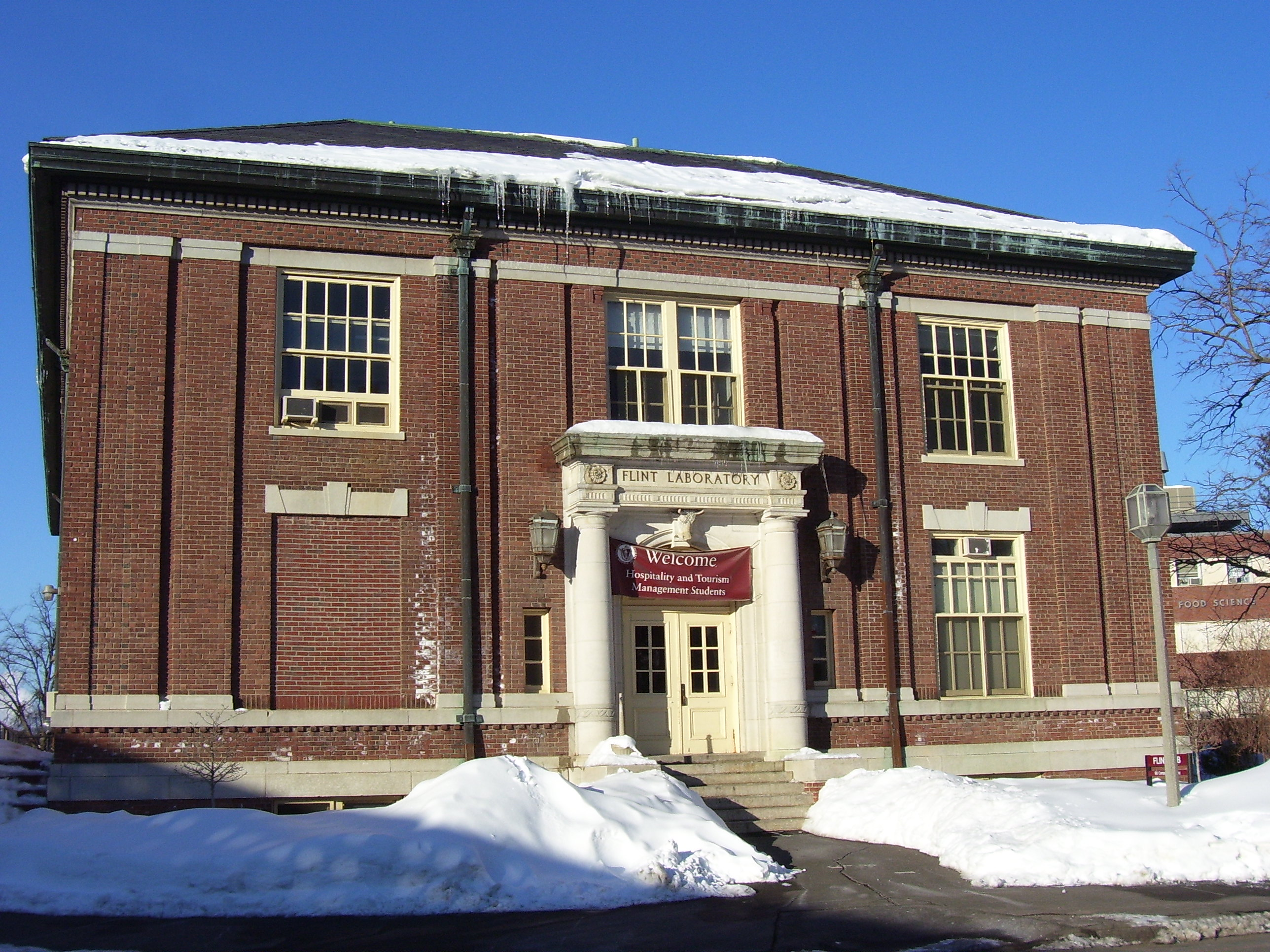
- Flint Laboratory in 2011
- Interactive map of the Flint Laboratory area
- Alternative names: Flint Hall; Dairy Building; Dairy Laboratory

General information
- Type: Academic offices, classrooms, former research laboratories, restaurant
- Architectural style: Georgian Revival
- Coordinates: 42.3916°N 72.5296°W
- Current tenants: vacant
- Construction started: 1911
- Completed: 1912

Technical details
- Floor count: 4

Design and construction
- Architect: James H. Ritchie
- Main contractor: Lines Company

Flint Laboratory is an academic building and a former dairy laboratory at the University of Massachusetts Amherst. It was the first building of the Ellis Drive "agricultural group", including Stockbridge Hall and an unbuilt hall for agricultural mechanics. At the time of its completion, the laboratory was considered to be "one of the best equipped dairy buildings in the United States" and was described as "a model for the whole country" in one edition of the Works Progress Administration guidebook to Massachusetts. The building was named after Charles L. Flint, the university's fourth president, the first secretary of the state board of agriculture, a lecturer on dairy farming, and a prolific agricultural writer who wrote a well-received textbook on "Milch Cows" in the late 19th century.

Today the building is vacant and awaiting renovation beginning in 2025. It was last used by the university's Department of Hospitality and Tourism Management, and included the former "dairy bar" that had been repurposed as a restaurant known as Fletcher's Café, which was run by students of the hospitality program.

== See also ==
- Charles L. Flint
- Ellis Drive Historical Area
