= Kumble R. Subbaswamy =

Indian University Administrator

Kumble Subbaswamy
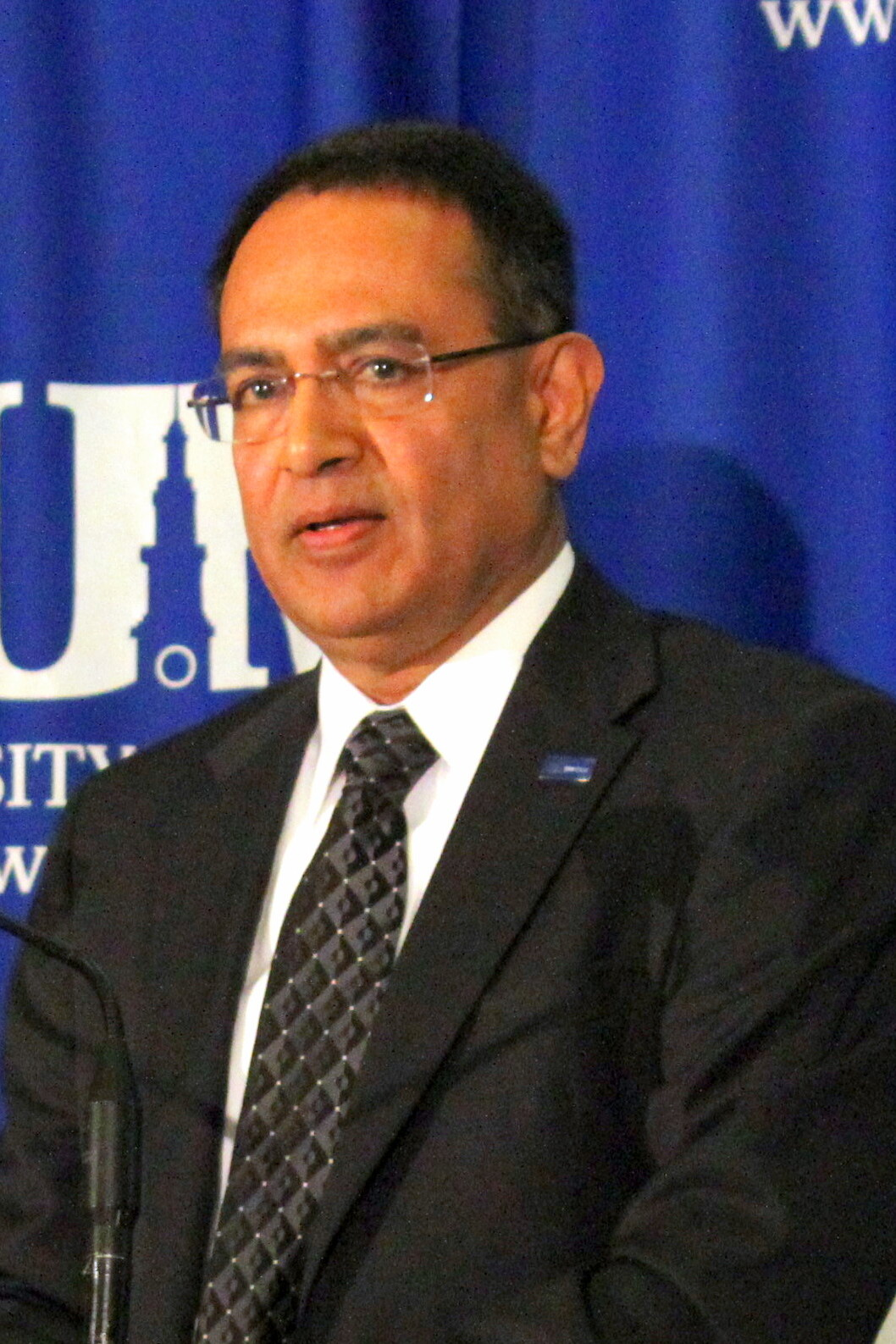

11th Chancellor of the University of Massachusetts, Amherst
- In office July 1, 2012 – June 30, 2023
- Preceded by: Robert C. Holub
- Succeeded by: Javier Reyes

Personal details
- Born: Bangalore, India
- Education: Bangalore University (BS); University of Delhi (MS); Indiana University, Bloomington (PhD)

Kumble R. Subbaswamy is an Indian physicist and college administrator who served as the 11th chancellor of the University of Massachusetts Amherst. He then served as Interim Senior Vice President for Academic and Student Affairs and Equity until the end of 2024, serving the five-campus University of Massachusetts system. He formerly served as the provost of University of Kentucky.

He is a member of the American Academy of Arts and Sciences and also an elected fellow of the American Physical Society, and has research interests in computational chemistry and condensed matter physics.

On June 2, 2022, Subbaswamy announced that he would retire from being the chancellor by the end of June 2023.

== Early life and education ==
Subbaswamy was born in the city of Bangalore, Karnataka in India. He earned a Bachelor of Science degree in physics from Bangalore University, a Master of Science in physics from University of Delhi, and a Doctor of Philosophy in physics from Indiana University Bloomington.

== Career ==
=== Academia ===
He served as research associate in the department of physics at the University of California, Irvine from 1976 to 1978. He later joined as assistant professor at University of Kentucky in 1978 and rose to become the chair of the Department of Physics and Astronomy from 1993 to 1997.

He also served as adjunct professor (Professore a contratto) at University of Pavia in Italy in 1990.

He later served as the dean of the College of Arts and Sciences in the Department of Physics at both University of Miami and Indiana University Bloomington. He then served as the provost of University of Kentucky.

After becoming chancellor of the University of Massachusetts Amherst in 2012, he and his wife worked with the UMass Permaculture Committee to create a sustainable garden featuring Southeast Asian plants at their Hillside residence on campus.

After retiring as UMass Amherst chancellor, he was appointed senior vice president for academic and student affairs and equity, serving the UMass five-campus, 74,000-student system.

== Honors and awards ==
He was awarded an honorary Doctor of Humane Letters from Indiana University Bloomington during 2019 Winter Commencement. He was also awarded Chancellor and Provost Medallion in 2006 and also IU Foundation President's Medallion from Indiana University Bloomington.

== Selected publications ==
- Local Density Theory of Polarizability (Physics of Solids and Liquids) (Publisher: Springer, Publication Year: 1st ed. 1990 edition (31 December 2013); ISBN 978-1489924889).

Academic offices
Preceded by Robert C. Holub	Chancellor of University of Massachusetts Amherst; 1 July 2012 - 30 June 2023	Succeeded by Javier Reyes
