= James C. Greenough =

James Carruthers Greenough
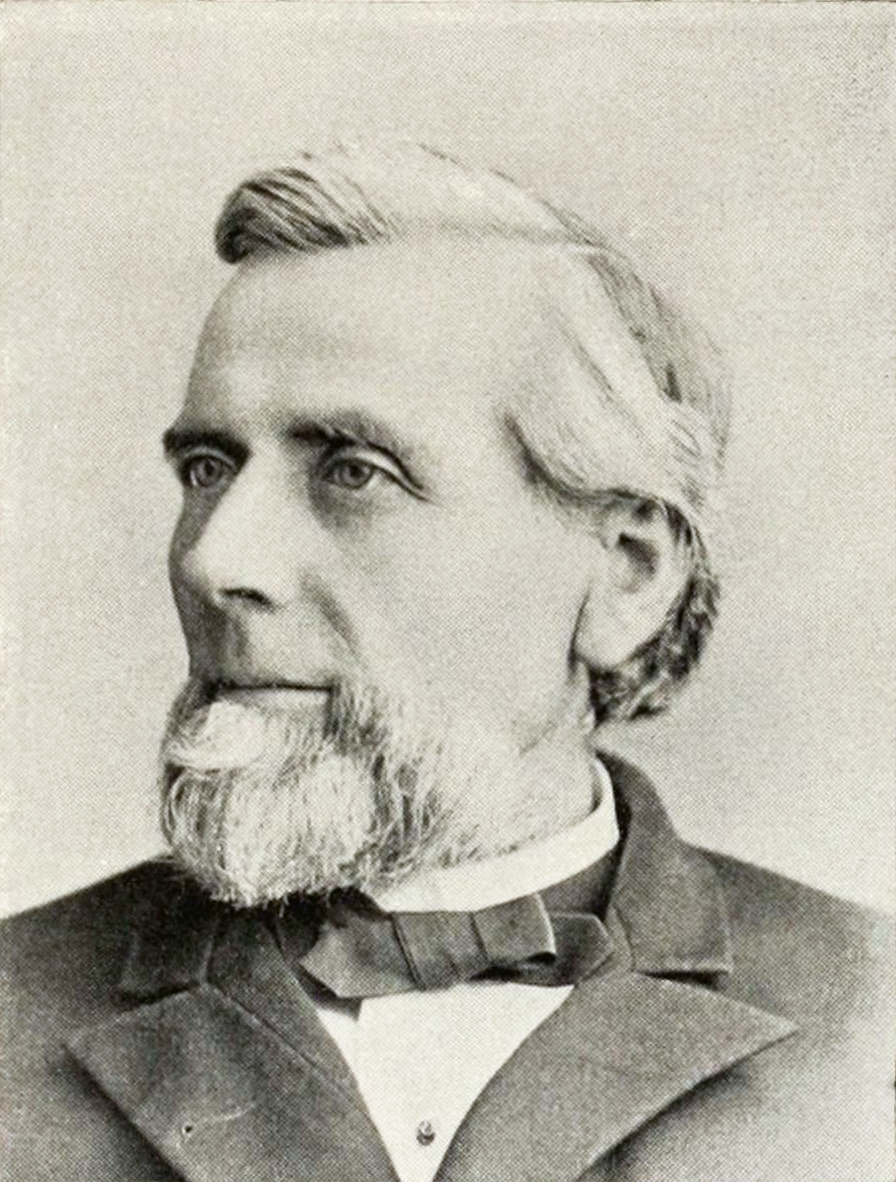
- James C. Greenough circa 1891

Principal of the Rhode Island Normal School (now Rhode Island College)
- In office 1871–1883

President of the Massachusetts Agricultural College (now the University of Massachusetts Amherst)
- In office 1883–1886

Principal of Westfield State Normal School (now Westfield State University)
- In office 1887–1896

Personal details
- Born: August 15, 1829 Wendell, Massachusetts, U.S.
- Died: December 4, 1924 (aged 95) Westfield, Massachusetts, U.S.
- Spouse: Jeanie Ashley Bates (1860–1921)
- Education: Williams College (A.B., A.M.); Brown University (A.M.); Berea College (LL.D.)

James Carruthers Greenough (August 15, 1829 – December 4, 1924) was an American educator who served as the third principal of the Rhode Island Normal School, sixth president of the Massachusetts Agricultural College, and seventh principal of the Westfield State Normal School. He was also an outspoken advocate of Christian teachings in public academic institutions, a fellow of the American Institute of Instruction, and author of a treatise on the British education system.

He was a member of the Central Congregational Church in Providence.

== Selected works ==
- "The Proper Work of Normal Schools" (1872)
- "Methods and Results" (1881)
- Address on Col. Marshall Pinckney Wilder (1883)
- "The Place and the Work of the State College" (1883)
- "Morality and Religion in the Public School" (1887)
- "The Relation of the College to Pedagogics" (1893)
- "The Evolution of the Elementary Schools of Great Britain" (1903)
- "A History of the Town of Westfield" (1919)

Academic offices
Preceded by Joshua Kendall	Principal of the Rhode Island Normal School; 1871–1883	Succeeded by Thomas J. Morgan
Preceded by Levi Stockbridge	President of the Massachusetts Agricultural College; 1883–1886	Succeeded by Henry H. Goodell
Preceded by Joseph G. Scott	Principal of Westfield State Normal School; 1887–1896	Succeeded by Charles S. Chapin
