= List of chancellors of the University of Massachusetts Amherst =

Chancellors of the University of Massachusetts Amherst are individuals who serve in the top position of the university. The office, originally known as "President," was changed to "Chancellor" in 1970 following John W. Lederle's resignation and the opening of UMass Boston five years earlier. The title "President of the University of Massachusetts" now refers to the president of the entire five-campus University of Massachusetts system. The current chancellor of the Amherst campus is Javier Reyes. The chancellor resides in Hillside, the campus residence for chancellors.

== List of presidents and chancellors ==
=== Presidents of the University of Massachusetts (1864–1970) ===
For the list of presidents who led the Amherst campus prior to 1970 see University of Massachusetts#Presidents.

=== Chancellors of the University of Massachusetts Amherst ===
The following persons have served as chancellor of University of Massachusetts Amherst

No.	Image	Chancellor	Term start	Term end	Ref.
1		Oswald Tippo	1970	1971	
2		Randolph W. Bromery	1971	1979	
3		Henry Koffler	1979	1982	
interim		Loren Baritz	1982	1982	
4		Joseph Duffey	1982	1991	
5		Richard D. O'Brien	1991	1993	
6		David K. Scott	July 1, 1993	June 30, 2001	
interim		Marcellette G. Williams	July 1, 2001	June 30, 2002	
7		John V. Lombardi (Note: Resigned to head Louisiana State University system.)	July 1, 2002	August 31, 2007	
interim		Thomas W. Cole Jr.	September 1, 2007	July 31, 2008	
8		Robert C. Holub	August 1, 2008	June 30, 2012	
9		Kumble R. Subbaswamy	July 1, 2012	June 30, 2023	
10		Javier Reyes	July 1, 2023	present	

Table notes:
