= Old Chapel (Amherst, Massachusetts) =

- U.S. National Register of Historic Places
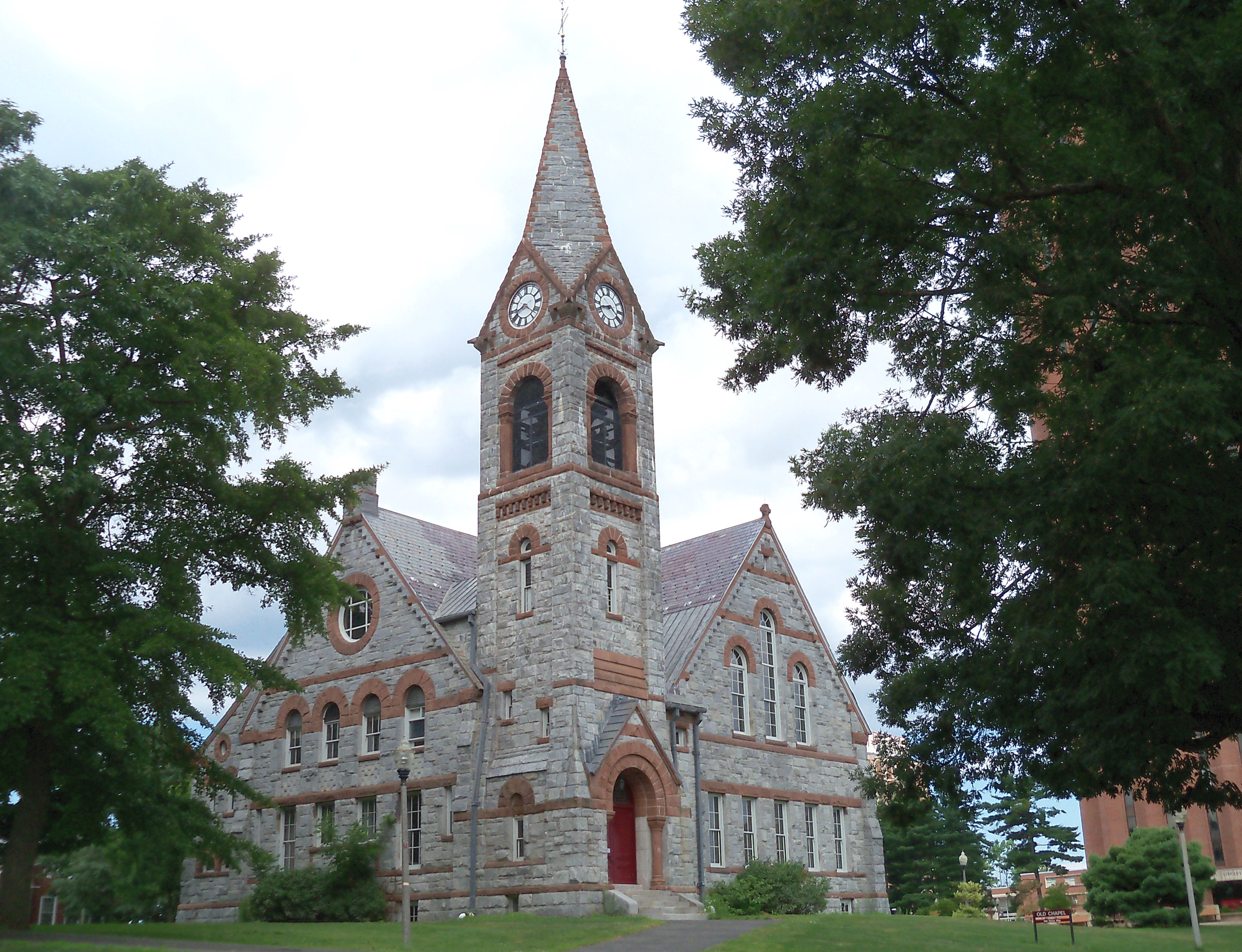
- Old Chapel in 2013

- Location within Massachusetts
- Location: Amherst, Massachusetts
- Coordinates: 42°23′20″N 72°31′41″W
- Built: 1884–1887
- Architect: Stephen C. Earle, Worcester
- Architectural style: Richardsonian Romanesque
- NRHP reference No.: 15000211
- Added to NRHP: May 11, 2015

Old Chapel, formerly known as the Old Chapel Library, is a former library on the campus of the University of Massachusetts Amherst that is on the National Register of Historic Places.

== History ==
Old Chapel was originally constructed in Richardson Romanesque-style between 1884 and 1887 at a cost of $25,000 (equivalent to $895,833 in today's dollars), to serve as a library, museum, and assembly hall. The building was designed by Worcester architect Stephen C. Earle, and is a roughly square stone structure with a tower at its southeast corner. It is made primarily of granite, with sandstone trim and a slate roof. The tower features an open belfry with rounded arches, above which are gabled peaks with clock faces, and a diagonally set four-sided steeple at the top.

According to the school, John F. Kennedy supposedly spoke at the Chapel during his 1952 U.S. Senate campaign, although this has never been confirmed.

The chapel's original bell, "Old Aggie," was added in 1892, but has since been replaced by 44 carillon bells. Although the tower underwent a $1.65 million renovation in 1999, Old Chapel has been uninhabited since 1996, when the University of Massachusetts Minuteman Marching Band moved out due to unsafe conditions within the structure. Since then, a movement amongst alumni was created to further renovate the interior of the building so that the structure could be used again.

Restoration of Old Chapel began in 2015 after a 2013 campaign by Chancellor Kumble R. Subbaswamy to restore and repurpose the interior of the structure. This included a nomination by Preserve UMass to place the structure on the National Register of Historic Places, which occurred on May 11, 2015. The Chapel was reopened on March 23, 2017 with a ribbon cutting ceremony.

== See also ==
- National Register of Historic Places listings in Hampshire County, Massachusetts
