= Blue Wall Cafe =

Food court at the University of Massachusetts Amherst

Coordinates: 42°23′29.72″N 72°31′36.11″W

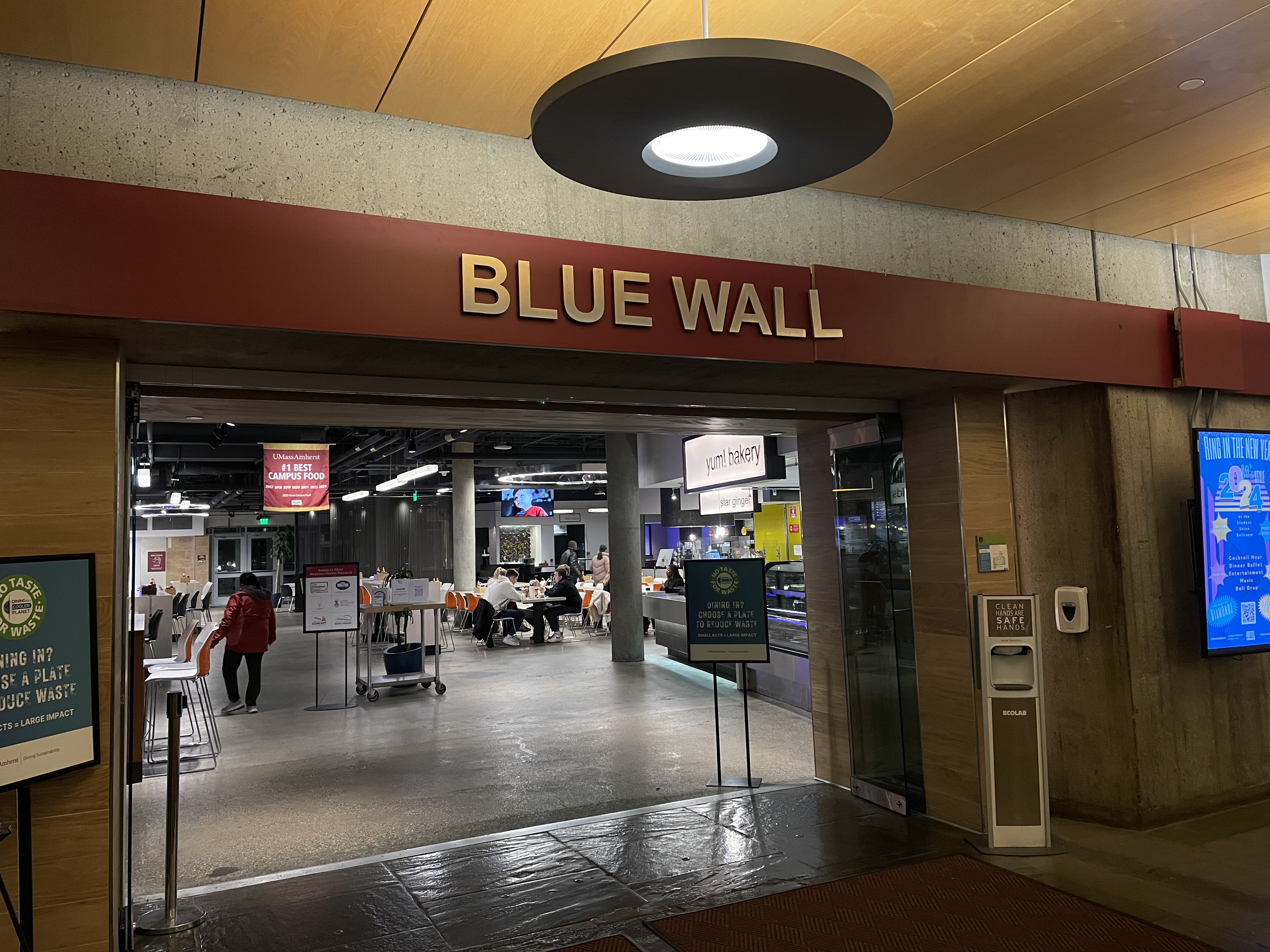
Entrance to the renovated Blue Wall

The Blue Wall is a former dive bar and current food court at the University of Massachusetts Amherst. Opening inside the Murray D. Lincoln Campus Center in the 1970s, the bar made upwards of $600,000 in the late 1970s (over $2,300,000 in 2013 dollars), and went through 1,800 kegs a year. This made it one of the largest beer-consuming establishments in the Northeastern United States. Following the raising of the drinking age to 21 in the United States, the bar experienced a decline in sales, before finally going dry in the 1980s. In the early 2000s, alcohol was again served, although it proved to be unprofitable.

In 2014, the dining facility underwent an almost year-long nineteen million dollar renovation, which saw it connect to a nearby restaurant and increase seating capacity by thirty percent. The new combined area totals 42,000 square feet and has space for 900 customers. The campus center also includes several other food and drink options, including the UPub (bar for 21+), the grab and go Marketplace, and People's Organic Coffee.
