= Murray Lincoln =

American business executive in the cooperative movement

- Born: Murray Danforth Lincoln; April 18, 1892; Massachusetts, United States
- Died: November 7, 1966 (aged 74); Columbus, Ohio
- Occupation: Business executive
- Known for: Leader in the cooperative movement and former CEO of Nationwide Mutual Insurance Company

Murray Lincoln (April 18, 1892 – November 7, 1966) was an American business executive, leader in the cooperative movement and former CEO of Nationwide Mutual Insurance Company where he served in the capacity from 1939 to 1964.

== Early life and education ==
Lincoln was born Murray Danforth Lincoln on April 18, 1892, and grew up in Raynham, Massachusetts. Born and raised on a small farm, Lincoln obtained his Bachelor of Science degree from Massachusetts Agricultural College (now the University of Massachusetts Amherst) in 1914. He was a member of Lambda Chi Alpha fraternity.

== Career ==
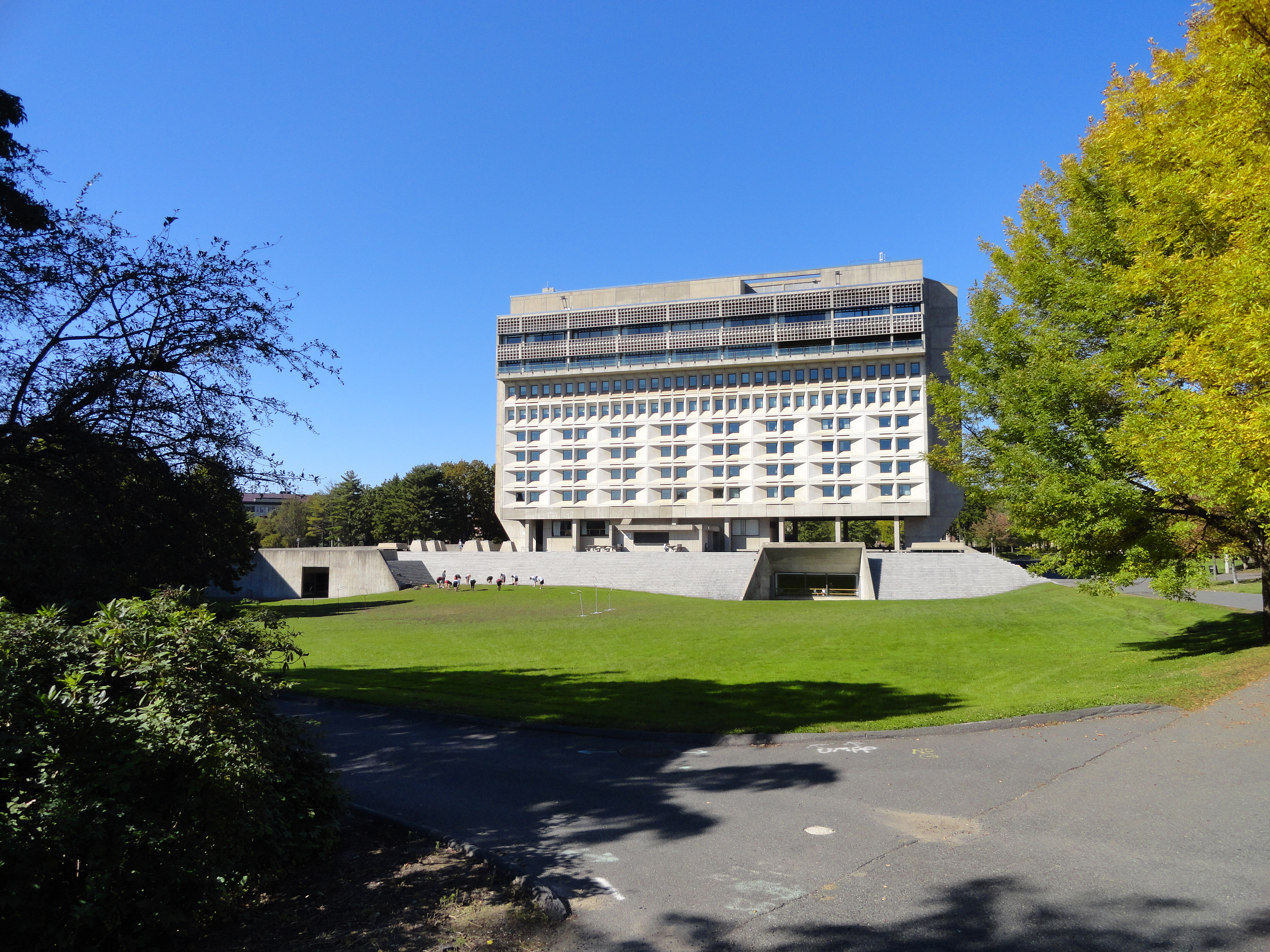
Murray D. Lincoln Campus Center at the University of Massachusetts

Lincoln was first executive vice president of Ohio Farm Bureau, a founder of Farm Bureau Mutual Automobile Insurance Company (now Nationwide Insurance) and was elected president of the companies in 1939. He served until his retirement in 1964.

In 1960, Lincoln headed the task force on the proposed Food for Peace Program for President elect John F. Kennedy. The task force report in 1961 urged the United States to expand its global food program and give or sell at current cut rate prices at least $3 billion worth of surplus food annually to poorer nations. In 1961, Lincoln was appointed to the Peace Corps advisory council. He was a member of the executive committee of the U.S. Committee for the United Nations, the U.N. Advisory Council, and the U.S. delegation to the United Nations Conference on Food and Agriculture.

Lincoln helped found CARE and served as president for 12 years, from its founding in 1945 until 1957. Towards the end of 1957, Lincoln announced his plans to resign from the CARE presidency. The board of directors accepted his decision and created a new post—chairman of the board. In 1957, Lincoln became CARE's first chairman, a post he held until the end of 1966.

== Death ==
After a two-year illness, Lincoln died November 7, 1966, in Columbus, Ohio. The Murray D. Lincoln Campus Center at the University of Massachusetts, completed in 1970, is named in his honor.
