= Murray D. Lincoln Campus Center =

Public space/hotel in Massachusetts, United States

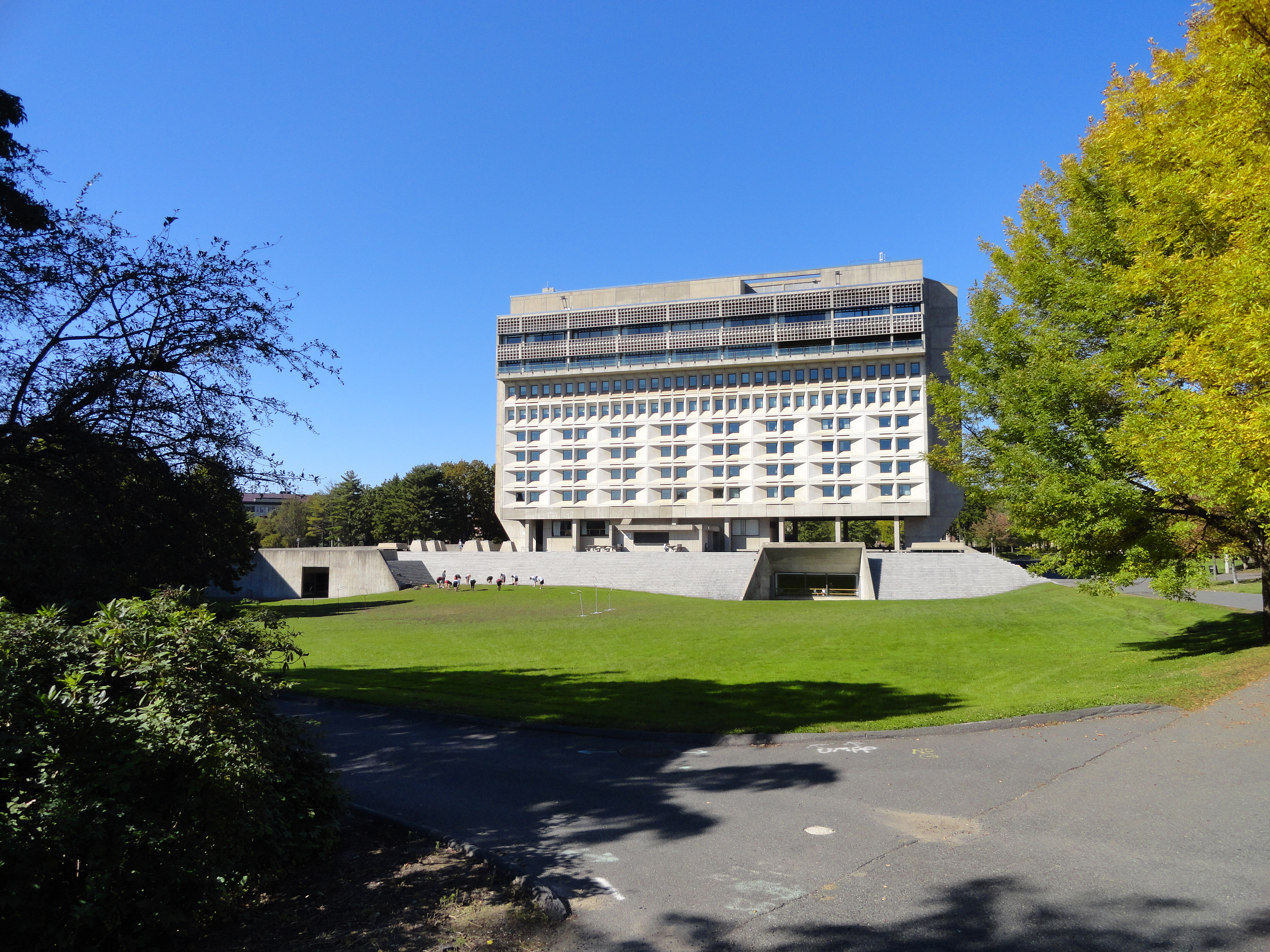
- Campus Center in 2011
- Interactive map of the Murray D. Lincoln Campus Center area

General information
- Type: Public Space/Hotel
- Location: 1 Campus Center Way; Amherst, Massachusetts 01003; United States
- Coordinates: 42°23′30.31″N 72°31′37.24″W
- Construction started: 1969
- Completed: 1970

Height
- Antenna spire: 204.98 feet (62.48 m)

Technical details
- Floor count: 14

Design and construction
- Architect: Marcel Breuer & Associates

Murray D. Lincoln Campus Center is a high-rise building on the University of Massachusetts Amherst campus, in Amherst, Massachusetts. The Center is named after Murray D. Lincoln, a leader in the cooperative movement, a founder of what became Nationwide Insurance, and co-founder and first president of CARE.

The concrete building and attached parking garage were designed by Marcel Breuer in the Modernist and Brutalist architectural styles. The building also hosts the 116-room Hotel UMass (formerly The Campus Center Hotel) on floors three through seven. Between 2008 and 2009, the hotel was renovated by Eastern General Contractors of Springfield, MA under the direction of architectural firm Gensler.
