= University of Massachusetts Amherst =

Public research university in Amherst, Massachusetts, US

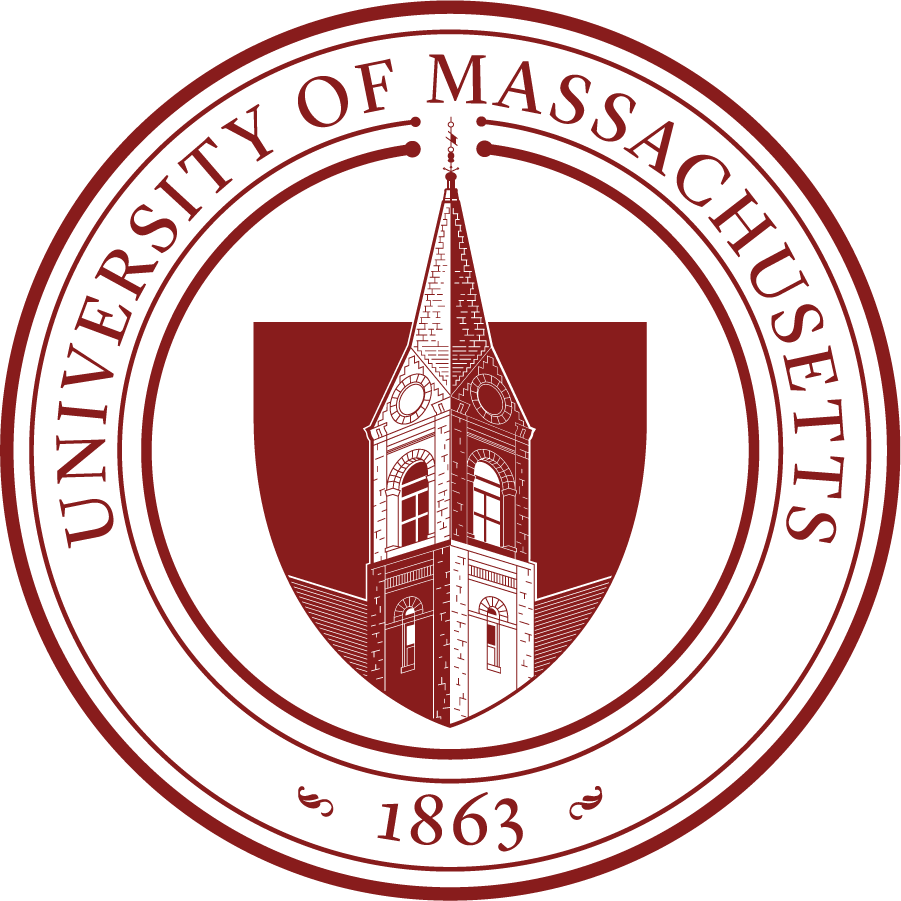
- Former names: Massachusetts Agricultural College (1863–1931); Massachusetts State College (1931–1947)
- Motto: Ense petit placidam sub libertate quietem (Latin)
- Motto in English: "By the sword we seek peace, but peace only under liberty."
- Type: Public land-grant research university (Note: University of Massachusetts Amherst is the sole public university which is a land grant university in the state of Massachusetts. It is one among two universities in Massachusetts which is a land grant university, the other being a private university – Massachusetts Institute of Technology. See List of land-grant universities.)
- Established: April 29, 1863; 163 years ago
- Parent institution: University of Massachusetts
- Accreditation: NECHE
- Academic affiliations: Five Colleges
- Endowment: $672 million (FY2025) (Amherst only) $1.8 billion (FY2025) (system-wide)
- Chancellor: Javier Reyes
- President: Marty Meehan (system)
- Provost: Fouad Abd-El-Khalick
- Academic staff: 1,514 full-time, 296 part-time
- Students: 31,318 (fall 2025)
- Undergraduates: 24,019 (fall 2025)
- Postgraduates: 7,299 (fall 2025)
- Location: Amherst, Massachusetts, United States; 42°23′20″N 72°31′40″W
- Campus: 1,463 acres (5.92 km^{2}); suburban
- Newspaper: The Massachusetts Daily Collegian
- Colors: Maroon and white
- Nickname: Minutemen and Minutewomen
- Sporting affiliations: NCAA Division I FBS – MAC; Hockey East; NEISA
- Mascot: Sam the Minuteman
- Website: umass.edu

The University of Massachusetts Amherst (UMass Amherst) is a public land-grant research university in Amherst, Massachusetts, United States. It is the flagship campus of the University of Massachusetts system and was founded in 1863 as the Massachusetts Agricultural College. It is also a member of the Five College Consortium, along with four other colleges in the Pioneer Valley.

With roughly 24,000 enrolled undergraduates, UMass Amherst has the largest undergraduate student population in Massachusetts. The university offers academic degrees in 109 undergraduate, 77 master's, and 48 doctoral programs in nine schools and colleges. It is classified among "R1: Doctoral Universities – Very high research activity". According to the National Science Foundation, the university spent $211 million on research and development in 2018.

The university's 21 varsity athletic teams compete in NCAA Division I and are collectively known as the Minutemen and Minutewomen. The university is a member of the Mid-American Conference, though it plays ice hockey in Hockey East.

== History ==
=== Foundation and early years ===
The Stockbridge House on the campus of the university is the oldest house in the city of Amherst, built in 1728.

The university was founded in 1863 under the provisions of the Federal Morrill Land-Grant Colleges Act to provide instruction to Massachusetts citizens in "agricultural, mechanical, and military arts." Accordingly, the university was initially named the Massachusetts Agricultural College. In 1867, the college had yet to admit any students and had not completed any buildings but had been through two presidents. That same year, William S. Clark was appointed president of the college and professor of botany. He appointed a faculty, coordinated the completion of construction, and, in the fall of 1867, welcomed the first class of approximately 50 students. Clark became the first president to serve long-term after the school's opening. Of the school's founding figures, there are a traditional "founding four" – Clark, Levi Stockbridge, Charles Goessmann, and Henry Hill Goodell.

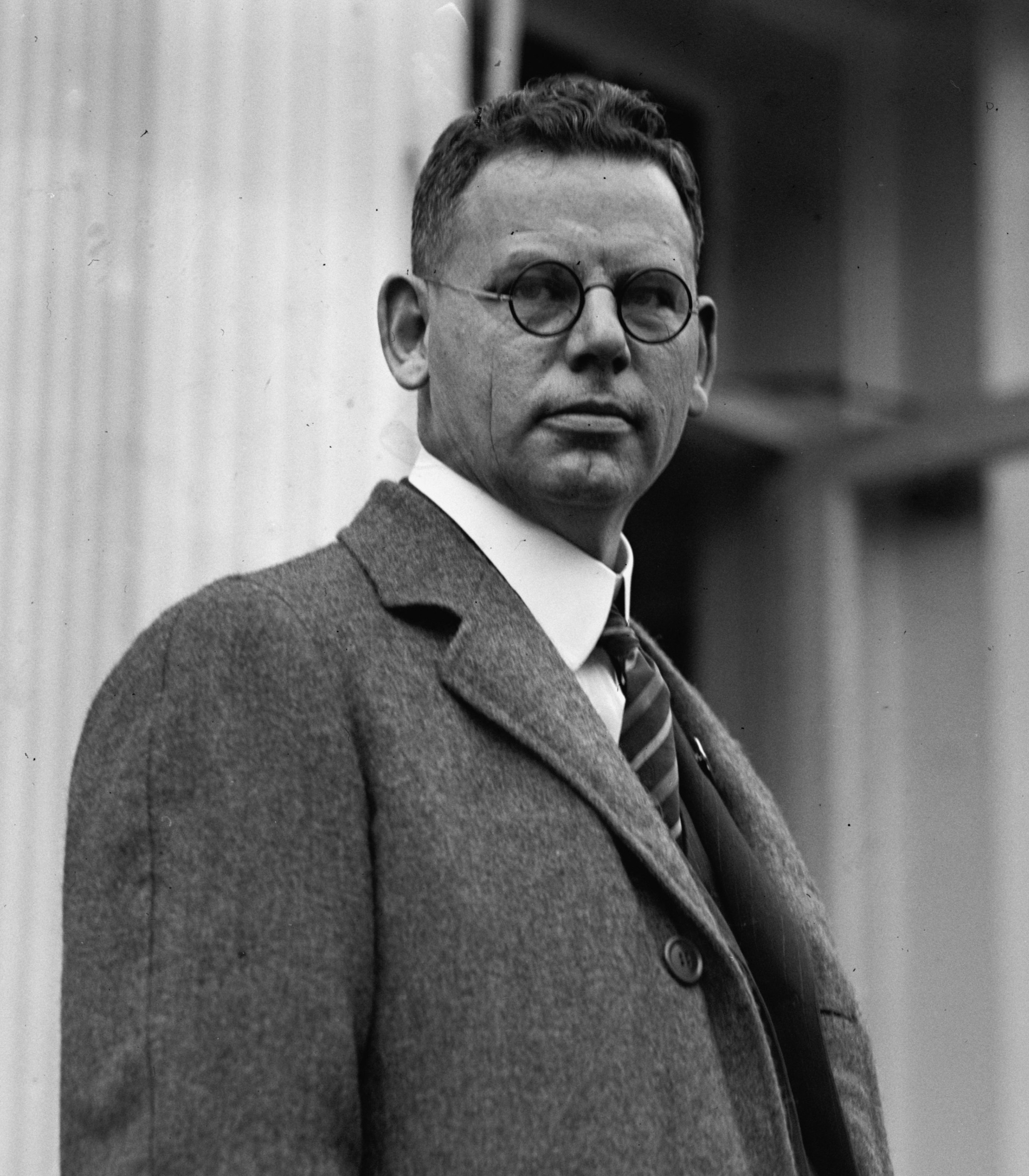
The University's Centennial Seal and Roscoe Wilfred Thatcher who was president when Massachusetts Agricultural College changed its name to Massachusetts State College in 1931.

The original buildings consisted of Old South College, North College, the Chemistry Laboratory, the Boarding House, the Botanic Museum, and the Durfee Plant House.

The fledgling college grew under the leadership of President Henry Hill Goodell. In the 1880s, Goodell implemented an expansion plan, adding the College Drill Hall in 1883, the Old Chapel Library in 1885, and the East and West Experiment Stations in 1886 and 1890.

The early 20th century saw expansion in enrollment and curriculum. The first female student was admitted in 1875 on a part-time basis and the first full-time female student was admitted in 1892. In 1903, Draper Hall was constructed for the dual purpose of a dining hall and female housing. The first female students graduated with the class of 1905. The first dedicated female dormitory, the Abigail Adams House (on the site of today's Lederle Tower), was built in 1920.

=== Modern era ===
By the 1970s, the University continued to grow and gave rise to a shuttle bus service on campus as well as many other architectural additions; this included the Murray D. Lincoln Campus Center complete with a hotel, office space, fine dining restaurant, campus store, and passageway to the parking garage, the W. E. B. Du Bois Library, and the Fine Arts Center.

In April 1990, the Young Americans for Freedom group held a homophobic "Burn a Fag in Effigy" student rally on campus. The event was repeated in March 1991 as a "straight pride demonstration", which was attended by about 50 people and protested by a crowd of approximately 500 people.

=== 21st century ===
In 2003, Massachusetts State Legislature designated the University of Massachusetts Amherst as a research university and the "flagship campus of the University of Massachusetts system". The university was named a top producer of Fulbright Award winners in the 2008–2009 academic year. Additionally, in 2010, it was named one of the "Top Colleges and Universities Contributing to Teach For America's 2010 Teaching Corps."

From World War II to 2023, the imagery on the official seal of the university was nearly identical to the state flag of the Commonwealth of Massachusetts. That image of the seal has been slowly removed starting in 2011, until March 2023 when a new image of the seal, featuring a profile of the Old Chapel spire, was ratified by the campus.

== Organization and administration ==
=== Colleges and schools ===
College/School	Year founded
Stockbridge School of Agriculture	1870
College of Education	1907
College of Humanities & Fine Arts	1915
School of Public Health and Health Sciences	1937
College of Social and Behavioral Sciences	1938
Isenberg School of Management	1947
Daniel J. Riccio Jr. College of Engineering	1947
Elaine N. Marieb College of Nursing	1953
College of Natural Sciences	2009
Manning College of Information and Computer Sciences	2015
School of Public Policy	2016

Since the University of Massachusetts Amherst was founded as the Massachusetts Agricultural College in 1863, 25 individuals have been at the helm of the institution. Originally, the chief executive of UMass Amherst was a president. When UMass Boston was founded in 1963, it was initially reckoned as an off-site department of the Amherst campus and was headed by a chancellor who reported to the president. A 1970 reorganization transferred day-to-day responsibility for UMass Amherst to a chancellor as well, with both chancellors reporting on an equal basis to the president. The title "President of the University of Massachusetts" now refers to the chief executive of the entire five-campus University of Massachusetts system.

The current Chancellor of the Amherst campus is Javier Reyes. The Chancellor resides in Hillside, the campus residence for chancellors. Reyes is the first person of Hispanic descent to serve as Chancellor of the university.

There are approximately 1,300 full-time faculty at the university. The university is organized into nine schools and colleges and offers 111 bachelor's degrees, 75 master's degrees, and 47 doctoral degrees.

== Academics ==
=== Rankings and reputation ===
Academic rankings

National
- Forbes: 135
- U.S. News & World Report: =59
- Washington Monthly: 63
- WSJ/College Pulse: 139

Global
- ARWU: 201–300
- QS: 260
- THE: =143
- U.S. News & World Report: 160

U.S. News & World Report's 2027 edition of America's Best Colleges ranked UMass Amherst tied for 59th on their list of "Best National Universities", and tied for 24th among 225 public universities in the U.S. UMass Amherst is accredited by the New England Commission of Higher Education.

=== Commonwealth Honors College ===
Commonwealth Honors College at UMass provides students the opportunity to intensify their UMass academic curriculum. Membership in the honors college is not required to graduate from the University with designations such as magna or summa cum laude. In 2013, the University completed the Commonwealth Honors College Residential Community (CHCRC) on campus to serve the college, including classrooms, administration, and housing for 1,500 students and some faculty.

=== Five College Consortium ===
UMass Amherst is part of the Five Colleges Consortium, which allows its students to attend classes, borrow books, work with professors, etc., at four other Pioneer Valley institutions: Amherst, Hampshire, Mount Holyoke, and Smith Colleges.

UMass Amherst holds the license for WFCR, the National Public Radio affiliate for Western Massachusetts. In 2014, the station moved its main operations to the Fuller Building on Main Street in Springfield, but retained some offices in Hampshire House on the UMass campus.

=== Community service ===
The Community Engagement Program (CEP) offers courses that combine classroom learning and community service. Co-curricular service programs include the Alternative Spring Break, Engineers without Borders, the Legal Studies Civil Rights Clinical Project, the Medical Reserve Corps, Alpha Phi Omega, the Red Cross Club, the Rotaract Club, UCAN Volunteer, and the Veterans and Service Members Association (VSMA).

The White House has named UMass Amherst to the President's Higher Education Community Service Honor Roll for four consecutive years, in recognition of its commitment to volunteering, service learning, and civic engagement. They have also been named a "Community-Engaged University" by the Carnegie Foundation for the Advancement of Teaching.

=== Research ===
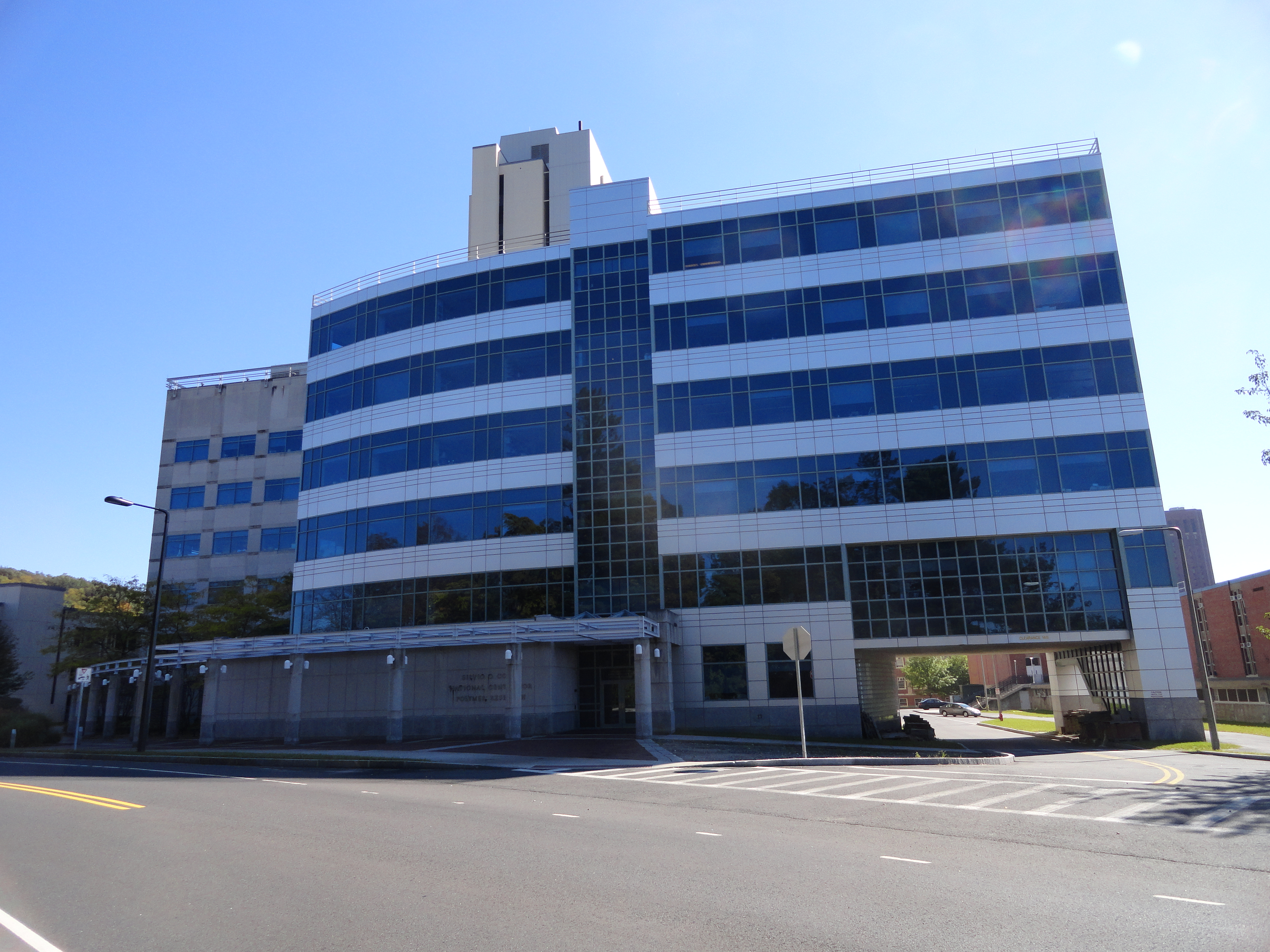
Conte National Polymer Research Center at the university.

UMass research activities totaled more than $200 million in fiscal year 2014 ($271,998,875 adjusting for inflation). In 2016, the faculty adopted an open-access policy to make its scholarship publicly accessible online.

A team of scientists at UMass led by Vincent Rotello has developed a molecular nose that can detect and identify various proteins. The research appeared in the May 2007 issue of Nature Nanotechnology, and the team is currently focusing on sensors, which will detect malformed proteins made by cancer cells. Also, UMass Amherst scientists Richard Farris, Todd Emrick, and Bryan Coughlin led a research team that developed a synthetic polymer that does not burn. This polymer is a building block of plastic, and the new flame-retardant plastic will not need to have flame-retarding chemicals added to its composition. These chemicals have recently been found in many different areas from homes and offices to fish, and there are environmental and health concerns regarding the additives. The newly developed polymers would not require the addition of potentially hazardous chemicals.

=== Admissions and enrollment ===
In 2012, the university reported that applications to the school had more than doubled since the Fall of 2003 and increased more than 80% since 2005.

The incoming Class of 2022 had an average high school GPA of 3.90 out of a 4.0 weighted scale, up from an average GPA of 3.83 the year before. The average SAT score of the Class of 2022 was 1294/1600, and on average the students ranked in the top fifth of their high school class. Acceptance to the Commonwealth Honors College program of UMass Amherst is more selective with an average SAT score of 1409/1600 and an average weighted high school GPA of 4.29.

== Campus ==
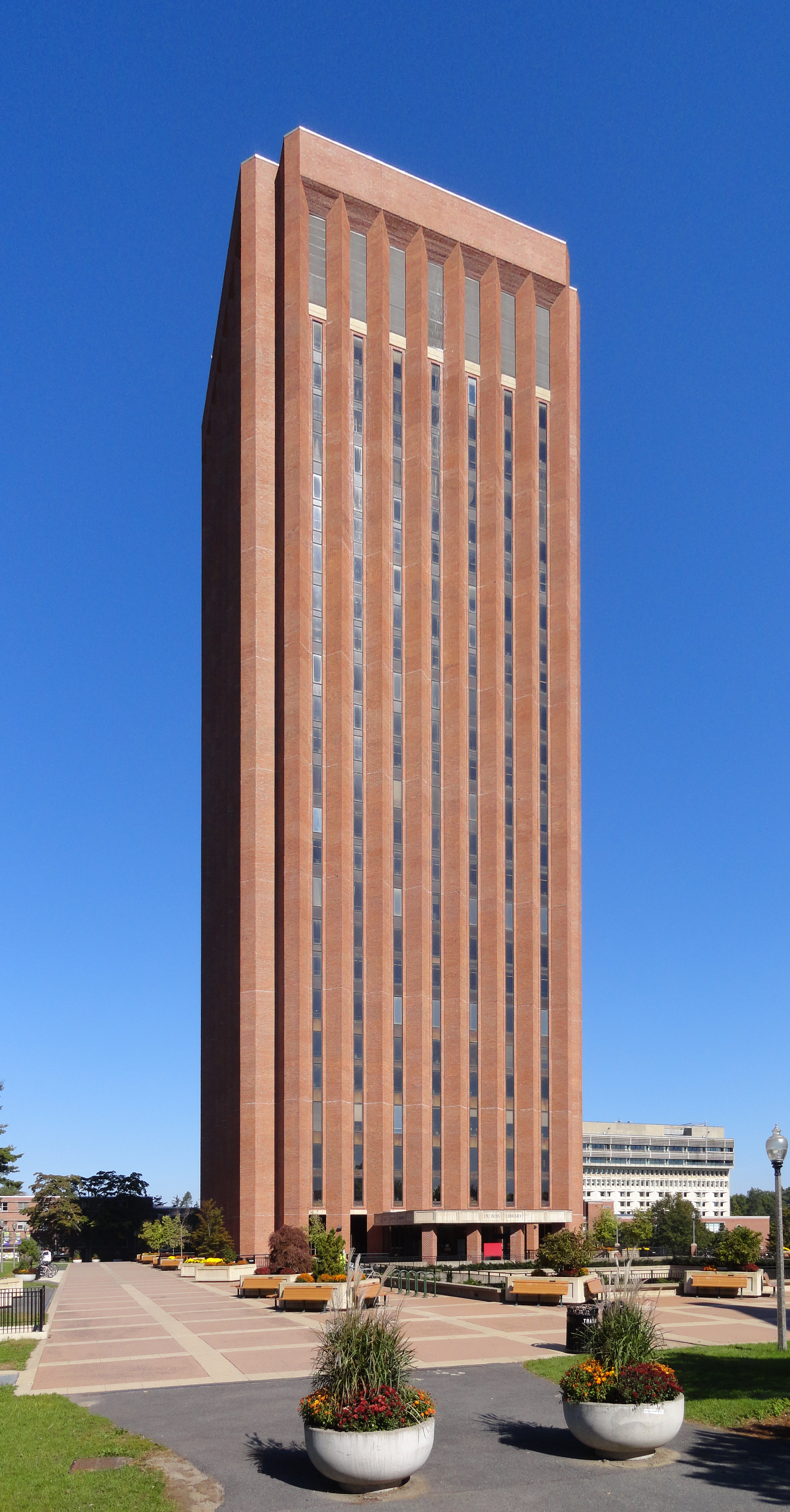
The W. E. B. Du Bois Library is the world's third tallest library and the tallest university library.

The University's campus is situated on 1,450 acres (590 ha) of historically Pocumtuc land, mainly in the town of Amherst, but also partly in the neighboring town of Hadley. The campus extends about 1 mile (1.6 km) from the Campus Center in all directions and may be thought of as a series of concentric rings, with the innermost ring harboring academic buildings and research labs, surrounded by a ring of the seven residential areas and two university-owned apartment complexes. These are in turn surrounded by a ring of athletic facilities, smaller administration buildings, and parking lots.

=== Libraries ===
The W. E. B. Du Bois Library is one of two library buildings on campus and the tallest academic research library in the world, standing 26 stories above ground and 286 feet (90.32 m) tall. Before its construction in the late 1960s, Goodell Hall was the university library, which was built after the library had outgrown its space in the 1885 "Old Chapel" building. Originally known as Goodell Library, the building was named for Henry H. Goodell, who had served as College Librarian, Professor of Modern Languages and English Literature, and eighth President of the Massachusetts Agricultural College. The Library is well regarded for its innovative architectural design, which incorporates the bookshelves into the structural support of the building. It is home of the memoirs and papers of the distinguished African-American activist and Massachusetts native W. E. B. Du Bois, as well as being the depository for other important collections, such as the papers of the late Congressman Silvio O. Conte. The library's special collections include works on movements for social change, African American history and culture, labor and industry, literature and the arts, agriculture, and the history of the surrounding region.

The Science and Engineering Library is the other library building, located in the Lederle Graduate Research Center Lowrise.

UMass is also home to the DEFA Film Library, the only archive and study collection of East German films outside of Europe. It was founded in 1993 by Barton Byg, professor of film and German Studies, and so named after the Deutsche-Film Aktiengesellschaft, the East German film company founded in 1946. Some years after German reunification, in 1997, an agreement with two German partners led to the creation of a collection of East German film journals along with a large collection of 16mm and 35mm prints of DEFA films. More have been added since.

The Shirley Graham Du Bois Library and Study Center is located in the New Africa House.

=== Other buildings and facilities ===
The university has several buildings (constructed in the 1960s and 1970s) of importance in the modernist style, including the Murray D. Lincoln Campus Center and Hotel designed by Marcel Breuer, the Southwest Residential Area designed by Hugh Stubbins Jr. of Skidmore, Owings & Merrill, The Fine Arts Center by Kevin Roche, the W. E. B. Du Bois Library by Edward Durell Stone, and Warren McGuirk Alumni Stadium by Gordon Bunshaft. Many of the older dorms and lecture halls are built in a Georgian Revival style such as French Hall, Fernald Hall, Stockbridge Hall, and Flint Laboratory.

=== Residential life ===
Residential Life at the University of Massachusetts Amherst is one of the largest on-campus housing systems in the United States. Over 14,000 students live in 52 residence halls, while families, staff, and graduate students live in 345 units in two apartment complexes (North Village and Lincoln). The fifty-two residence halls and four undergraduate apartment buildings are grouped into seven separate and different residential areas.

Located in the central corridor of campus, the Honors Community houses undergraduate members of Commonwealth Honors College.

=== Major campus expansion ===
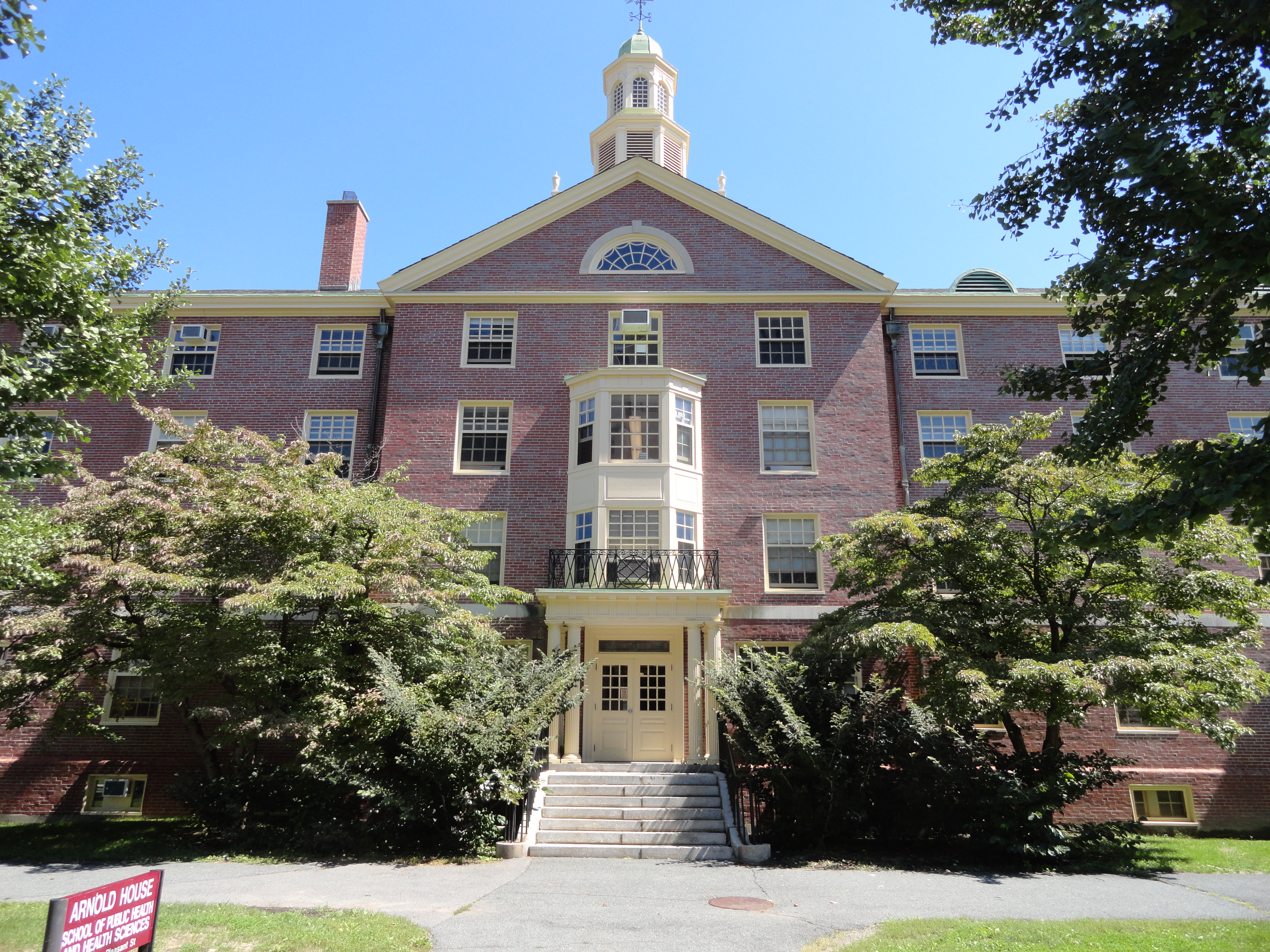
Arnold House, part of Northeast Residential Area

The University of Massachusetts Amherst campus embarked on a 10-year, $1 billion ($1.704545455×10^{9} in today's money) capital improvement program in 2004, setting the stage for re-visioning the campus's future. This includes construction of $156 million New Science Laboratory Building, $30 million Champions Basketball Center, an $85 million academic building, and $30 million in renovations to the football stadium.

In early 2016, the construction of a new electrical substation located near Tillson Farm was completed. The purpose of the substation is to supply electricity to the university more efficiently and reliably, with estimated savings of $1 million per year ($1,341,514 in today's money). The project was created in partnership with the utilities company Eversource, and cost approximately $26 million ($34,879,368 in today's money).

In April 2017, the University of Massachusetts Amherst officially opened its new Design Building. Previously estimated at $50 million ($65,673,364 in today's money) the 87,000 square feet (8,100 m^{2}) facility is the most advanced CLT building in the United States and the largest modern wood building in the northeastern United States.

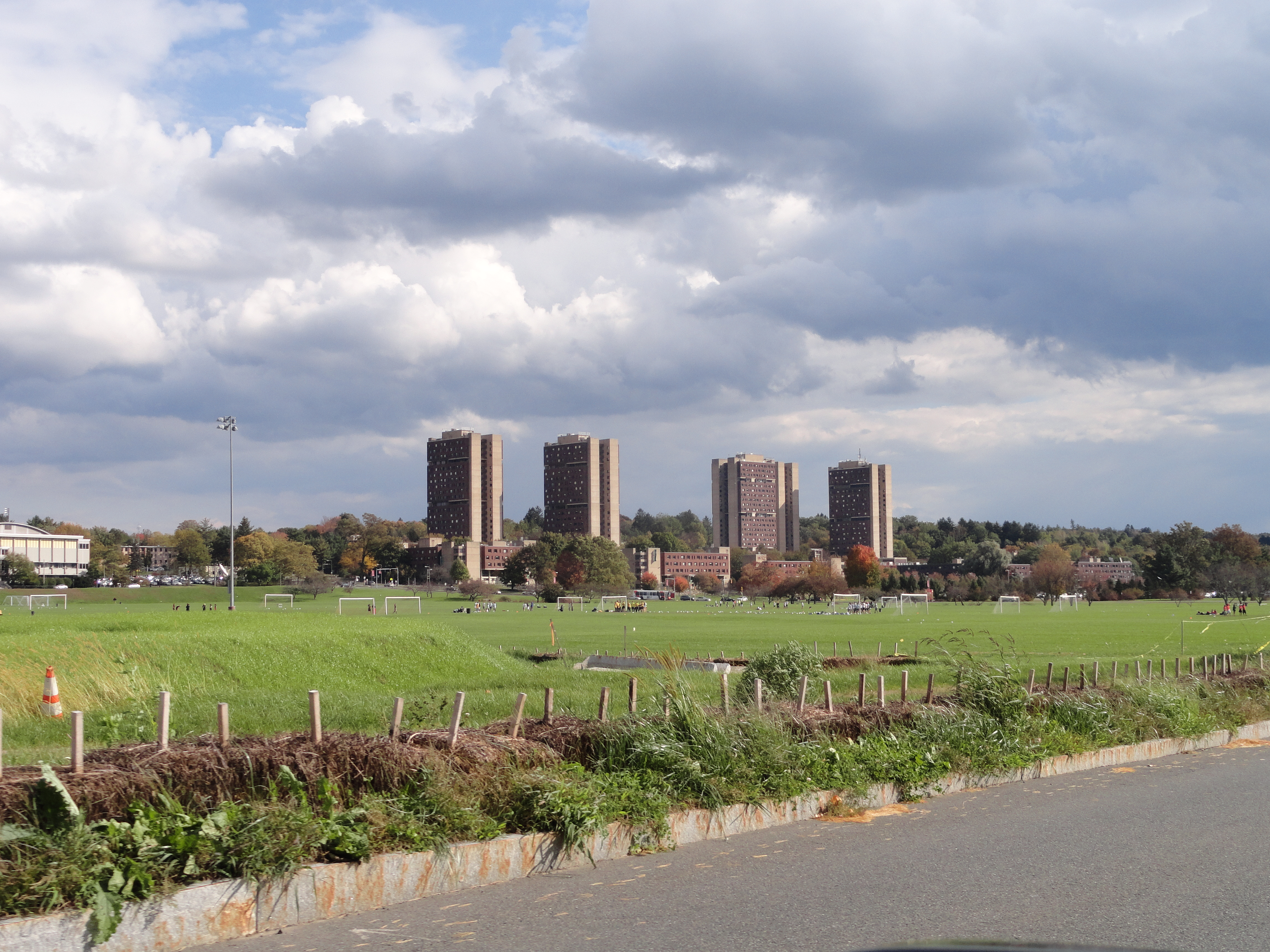
The Southwest residential area as seen from the athletic fields.

=== Charles River Campus of UMass Amherst ===
Charles River Campus of UMass Amherst (formerly known as the Mt. Ida Campus of UMass Amherst) primarily serves as a center for student experiential learning and professional development and facilitates connections between the state’s flagship public research university and the business, civic, government, education, and cultural communities in the Greater Boston region, amplifying UMass Amherst’s impact in the Commonwealth.

Acquired from the former Mount Ida College in 2018, the campus also serves as a secondary instructional and residential site for UMass Amherst, offering comprehensive internship pathways in a variety of disciplines, a career exploration program for first-year students, an undergraduate program in Veterinary Technology, and graduate programs in Statistics and Business and Analytics.

On April 6, 2018, Mount Ida College announced that it would shut down and the University of Massachusetts would be absorbing its campus. Mount Ida students were given a guaranteed transfer to UMass Dartmouth, and the campus became part of UMass Amherst.

=== Springfield Satellite Center of UMass Amherst ===
The UMass Amherst Henry M. Thomas III Center at Springfield is a center for secondary instruction of the university located in Springfield to connect the university to the nearest metropolitan area, which is located 25 miles away.

=== Campus safety ===
Riots occurred after the Boston Red Sox lost the 1986 World Series, won in 2004 and 2007, after the Red Sox were eliminated in the 2003 and 2008 playoffs, after UMass' football team lost in the Division I-AA football championship game in 2006 and after the Patriots first Super Bowl victory over St. Louis in Super Bowl XXXVI. The majority of these riots have been non-violent on the side of the students, except for the 1986 riot in which an argument between hundreds of students intensified into racial altercations where a black student was attacked and beaten to unconsciousness by 15 to 20 white students according to archives from The Republican. In the wake of these events, students have worked to have open dialogues with the administration and police department about campus safety, the right to gather, the police force, and better methods of crowd control.

=== Iranian student admissions controversy ===
Life Science Laboratories Building

UMass Amherst issued an announcement in early 2015 stating, "The University has determined that it will no longer admit Iranian national students to specific programs in the College of Engineering (i.e., Chemical Engineering, Electrical & Computer Engineering, Mechanical & Industrial Engineering) and in the College of Natural Sciences (i.e., Physics, Chemistry, Microbiology, and Polymer Science & Engineering) effective February 1, 2015."

The University claims that this announcement was posted because a graduate student entered Iran for a project and was later denied a visa. This event along with urging from legal advisers contributed to the belief that such incidents inhibited their ability to give Iranian students a "full program of education and research for Iranian students" and thus justified changing their admissions policies. The ensuing criticism on and off campus, as well as wide media publicity, changed the minds of school officials. As a result, UMass made a statement on February 18, 2015, committing to once again allowing Iranian students to apply to the aforementioned graduate programs.

On the same day, an official in the U.S. Department of State stated in an interview that: "U.S. laws and regulations do not prevent Iranian people from traveling to the United States or studying in engineering program of any U.S. academic institutions." UMass Amherst replaced the ban with a policy aimed at designing specific curricula for admitted Iranian nationals based on their needs. While less controversial, this policy has still generated backlash, with one student saying, "This university that's supposed to be so open-minded forcing him to sign a document saying he won't go home and build a bomb or something is just really disappointing to see."

=== Killing of Emma MacDonald ===
On the evening of Wednesday, April 22, 2026, Police responded to an emergency call at the UMass Hotel. Upon arrival officers encountered Jeffrey MacDonald, who allegedly admitted to killing his wife, Emma.

== Student life ==
Undergraduate demographics as of Fall 2023
Race and ethnicity	Total
White	58%
Asian	14%
Hispanic	9%
International student	8%
Black	4%
Two or more races	4%
Unknown	3%
Economic diversity
Low-income (Note: The percentage of students who received an income-based federal Pell grant intended for low-income students.)	21%
Affluent (Note: The percentage of students who are a part of the American middle class at the bare minimum.)	79%

=== Arts on campus ===
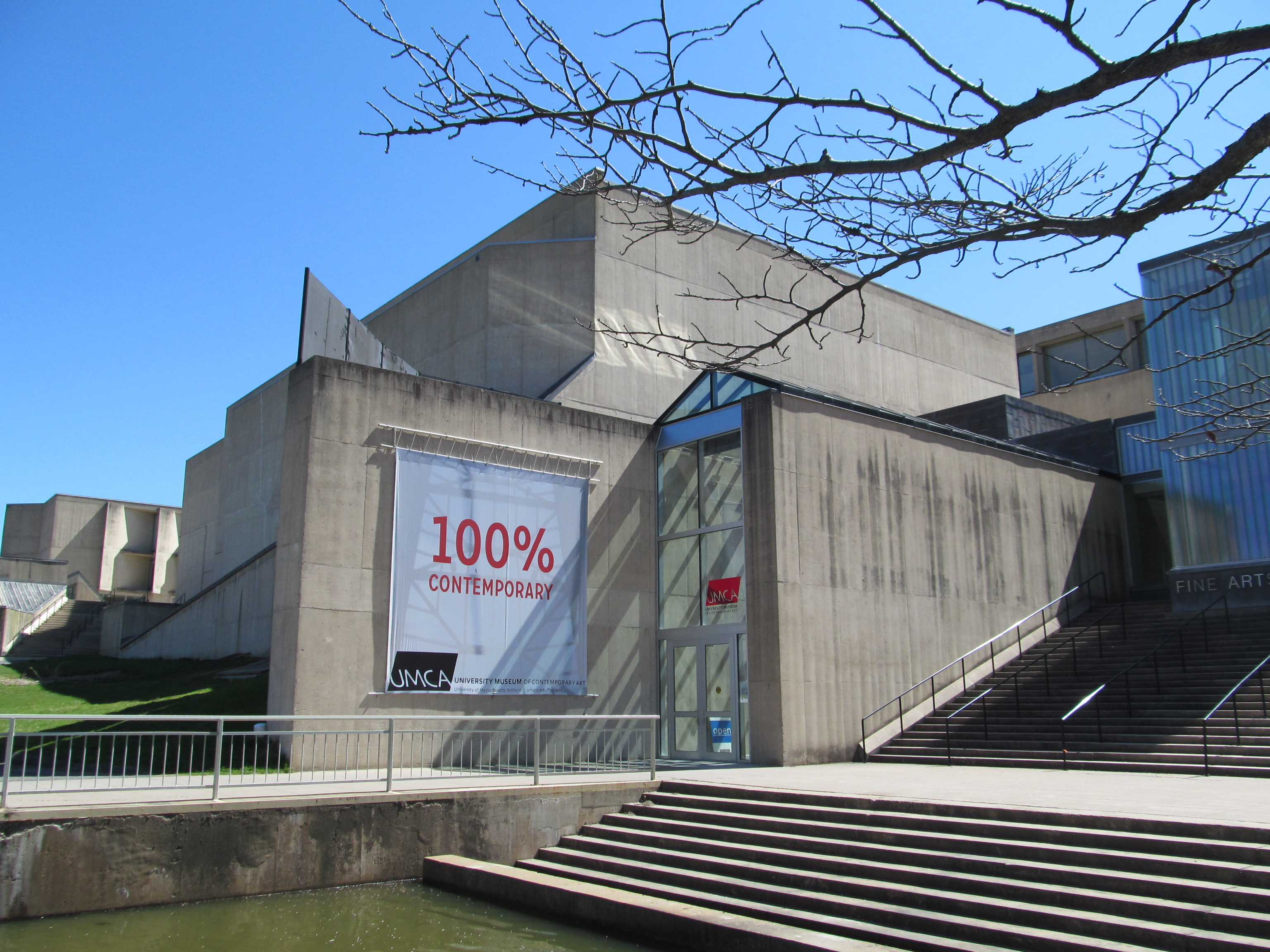
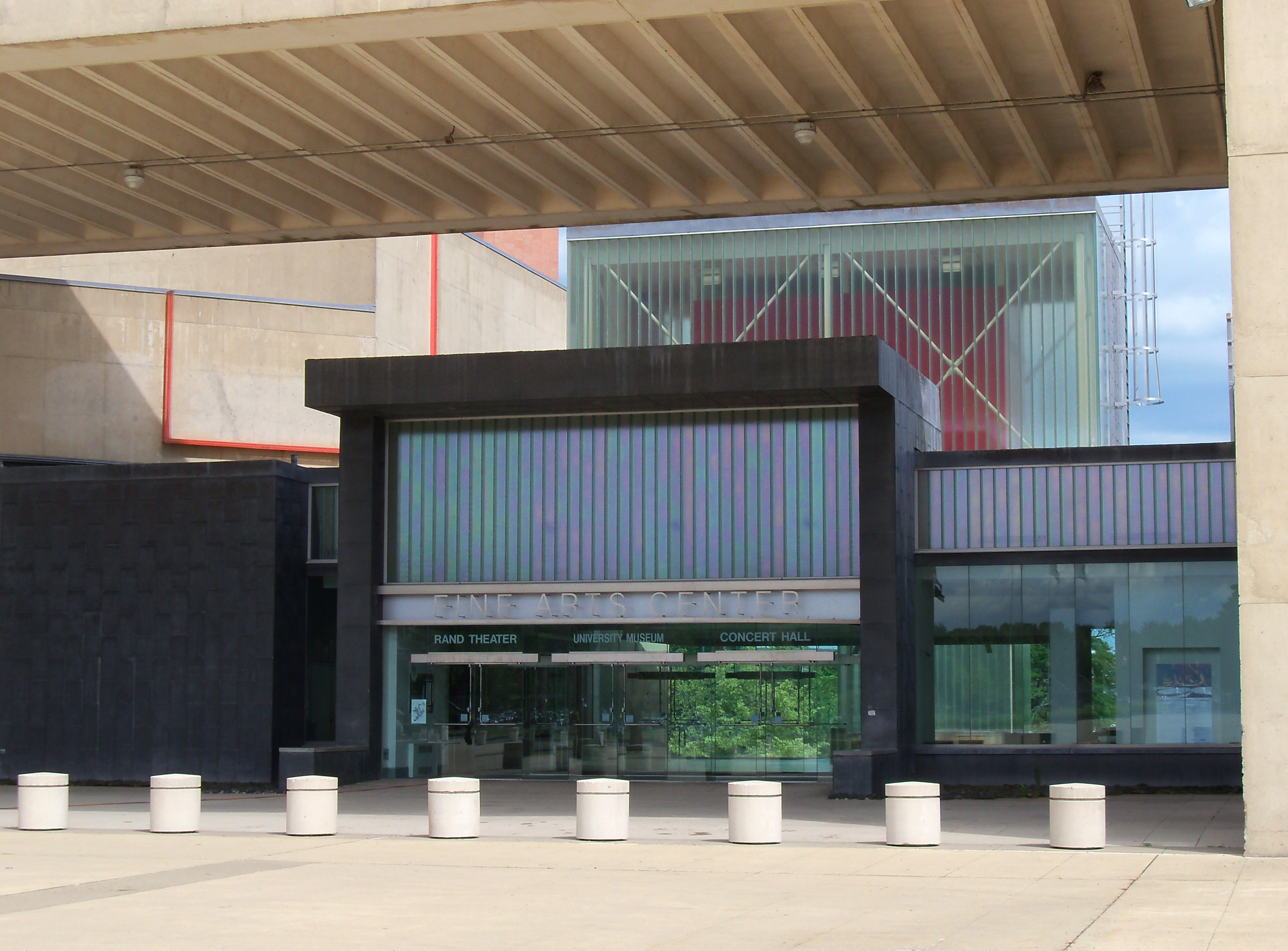
University Museum of Contemporary Art and Fine Arts Center

The UMass Amherst campus offers a variety of artistic venues, both performance and visual art. The most prominent is the Fine Arts Center (FAC) built in 1975. The FAC brings theater, music, and dance performances to campus throughout the year into its performance spaces (Concert Hall, Bezanson Recital Hall, and Bowker Auditorium). These include several performance series: Jazz in July Summer Music Program, The Asian Arts & Culture Program, Center Series, and Magic Triangle Series presenting music, dance, and theater performances, cultural arts events, films, talks, workshops, masterclasses, and special family events. University Museum of Contemporary Art in the FAC has a permanent contemporary art collection of about 2,600 works and hosts numerous visual arts exhibitions each year as well as workshops, masterclasses, and artist residencies.

The 9,000-seat Mullins Center, the multi-purpose arena of UMass Amherst hosts a wide variety of performances including speakers, rock concerts, and Broadway shows. In addition, the Music, Dance, and Theater Departments, the Renaissance Center, and multiple student groups dedicated to the arts provide an eclectic menu of performances throughout the year.

The Interdepartmental Program for Film Studies has been organizing the Massachusetts Multicultural Film Festival on campus since 1991.

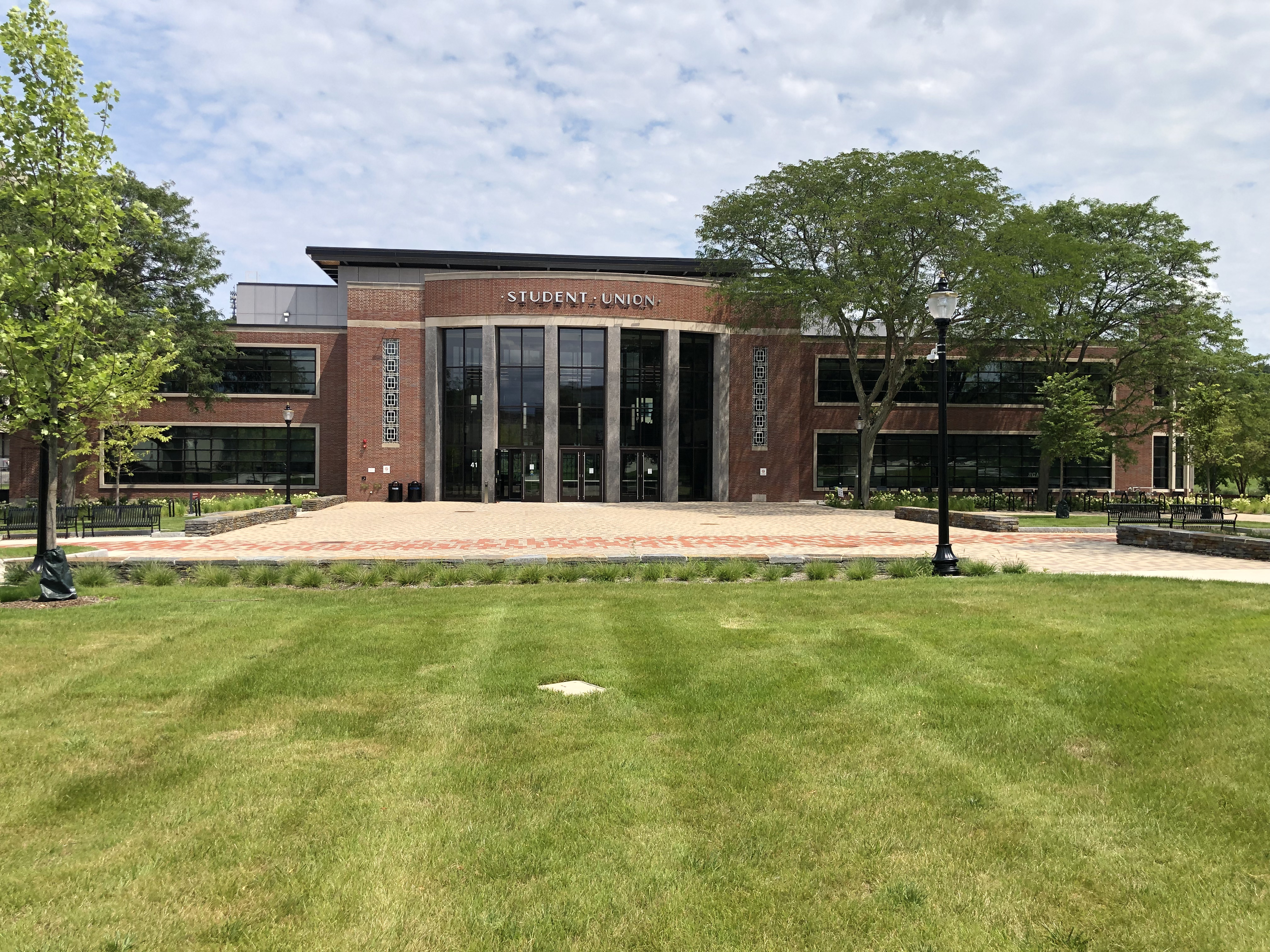
Student Union

=== Groups and activities ===
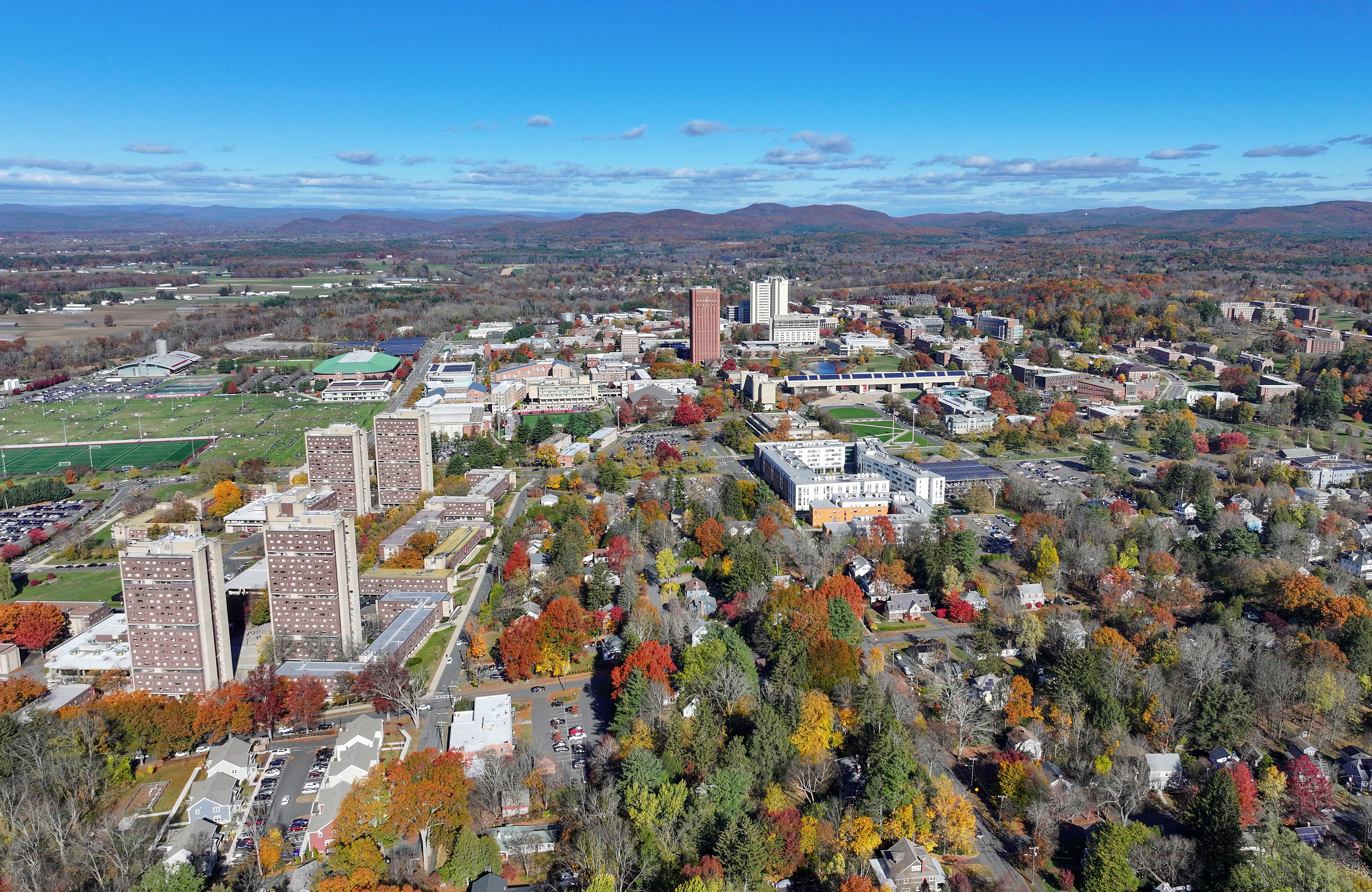
UMass Amherst looking north from the air

UMass Amherst has a history of protest and activism among the undergraduate and graduate population and is home to over 200 registered student organizations (RSOs).

==== Student Government Association ====
The Student Government Association (SGA) is the undergraduate student governmental body and provides funding for the many registered student organizations (RSOs) and agencies, including the Student Legal Services Office (SLSO) and the Center for Student Business (CSB). The SGA also makes formal recommendations on matters of campus policy and advocates for undergraduate students to the Administration, non-student organizations, and local and state government. As of the 2023 school year, the SGA had a budget of over $7.5 million per year, which is collected from students in the form of the $266 per year Student Activities Fee.

==== UMass permaculture ====
UMass permaculture is one of the first university permaculture initiatives in the nation and transforms marginalized landscapes on the campus into diverse, educational, low-maintenance, and edible gardens. Rather than tilling the soil, a more sustainable landscaping method known as sheet mulching is employed. In November 2010, "about a quarter of a million pounds of organic matter was moved by hand", using all student and community volunteer labor and no fossil fuels on-site. The process took about two weeks to complete. Now, the Franklin Permaculture Garden includes a diverse mixture of "vegetables, fruit trees, berry bushes, culinary herbs, and a lot of flowers that will attract beneficial insects."

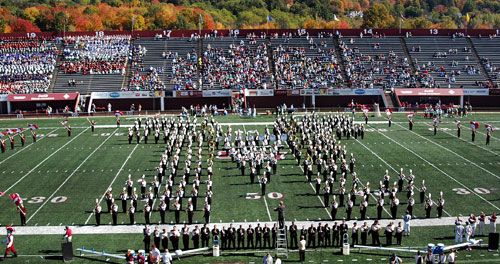
Minuteman Marching Band during a pre-game show.

==== Minuteman Marching Band ====
UMass Amherst has the largest marching band in New England. The Minuteman Marching Band consists of over 390 members and regularly plays at football games. The band also performs in various other places and events like the Collegiate Marching Band Festival in Allentown, Pennsylvania, Bands of America in Indianapolis, Symphony Hall, Boston, The Macy's Thanksgiving Day Parade, Tournament of Roses Parade in Pasadena, California, and on occasion Montreal, Quebec, Canada.

==== Fraternities and sororities ====
Fraternities, sororities, and honor societies have been present on the campus almost since inception, with its first fraternity, the Latin letter-named Q.T.V. emerging in 1869, and the first sorority, Delta Phi Gamma (local) in 1916. (Note: This local sorority was eventually split into four descendent chapters, with one of these in 1941 becoming the first nationally-affiliated chapter, joining Chi Omega.) Approximately 2,100 students are active members each academic year.

Several fraternities had houses on North Pleasant Street until 2007 when several lots owned by Alpha Tau Gamma were sold to the university for $2,500,000 ($3,881,801 in today's money). Alpha Tau Gamma, a local fraternity associated with the Stockbridge School of Agriculture, then donated $500,001 to endow the salary for the director of the Stockbridge School.

Criticism of sexual and alcohol abuse in Greek Life Organizations has appeared repeatedly in Bostonian and national news. Some students have called for changes in policy. The university has responded by creating a sorority and fraternity accreditation program and scorecard publishing community service, educational programming, grade reports, and conduct reports on their website.

=== 2023–24 Student Demonstrations ===
Following the October 7th, 2023 attack on Israel and the subsequent Israel–Hamas war, UMass Amherst experienced Pro-Palestinian student demonstrations throughout the 2023–24 academic year. A sit-in was held on October 25, 2023, followed by pro-Palestinian encampments on the university's South Lawn in April and May 2024. Demonstrators called for, among other demands, university divestment from defense-related companies. On May 7, university officials ordered an encampment removed. After demonstrators refused to disperse, police cleared the encampment and arrested 134 people, including approximately 70 UMass Amherst students, four faculty members, and two staff members. In November 2023, following a UMass Hillel event calling for the release of hostages held by Hamas, a UMass Amherst student was arrested after allegedly assaulting a student holding an Israeli flag and then taking and spitting on the flag. University representatives condemned the incident.

In May 2024, the Anti-Defamation League and the Louis D. Brandeis Center for Human Rights Under Law filed a Title VI complaint with the U.S. Department of Education's Office for Civil Rights, alleging that UMass Amherst had failed to adequately address discrimination and harassment directed at Jewish and Israeli students and had fostered a hostile antisemitic environment.

=== Media ===
==== The Massachusetts Daily Collegian ====
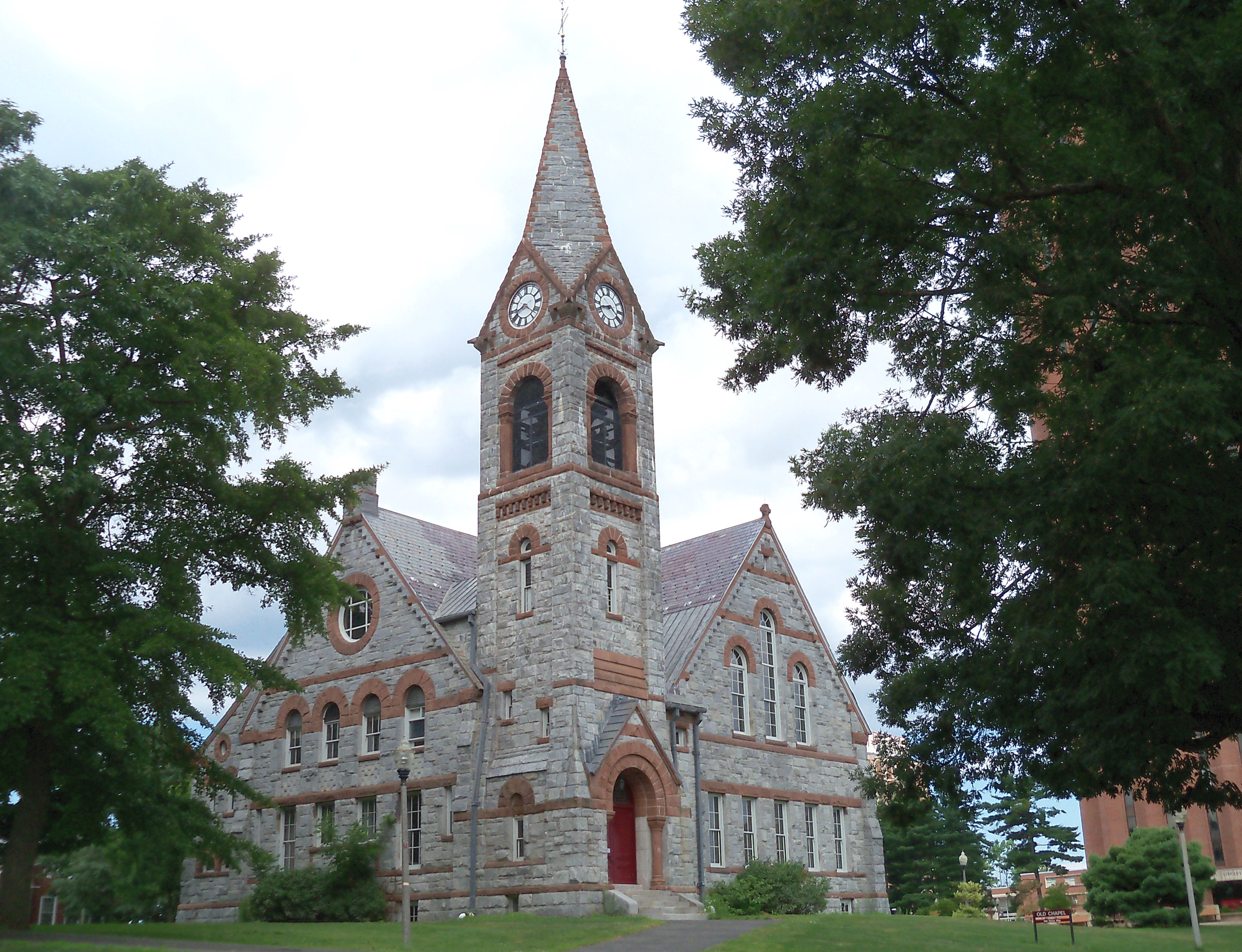
Old Chapel constructed in 1884 at the campus

The Massachusetts Daily Collegian, the official newspaper of UMass Amherst, is published Monday through Thursday during the calendar semester. The Collegian is a non-profit student-run organization that receives no funding from the university or student fees. The Collegian operates entirely on advertising revenues. Founded in 1890, the paper began as Aggie Life, became the College Signal in 1901, the Weekly Collegian in 1914, and the Tri-Weekly Collegian in 1956. Published daily since 1967, the Collegian has been broadsheet since January 1994. In 2018, the paper switched to monthly print editions while continuing to publish daily online. Since then, the Collegian has become primarily a digital publication, though it still publishes special print magazines on a per-semester basis.

==== WMUA 91.1 FM ====
The student-operated radio station, WMUA, is a federally licensed, non-commercial broadcast facility serving the Connecticut River Valley of Western Massachusetts, Northern Connecticut, and Southern Vermont. Although the station is managed by full-time undergraduate students of the University of Massachusetts, station members can consist of various members of the university and surrounding communities. WMUA began as an AM station in 1949.

==== WSYL-FM ====
There were two student-run, extremely-low-power FM radio stations from the mid-1970s through the 1980s: one that used the self-assigned identifier "WSYL-FM" (With Songs You Like) which operated in the basement of Cashin, and WOCH (OrChard Hill, the dormitory area), which operated from Grayson.

== Athletics ==
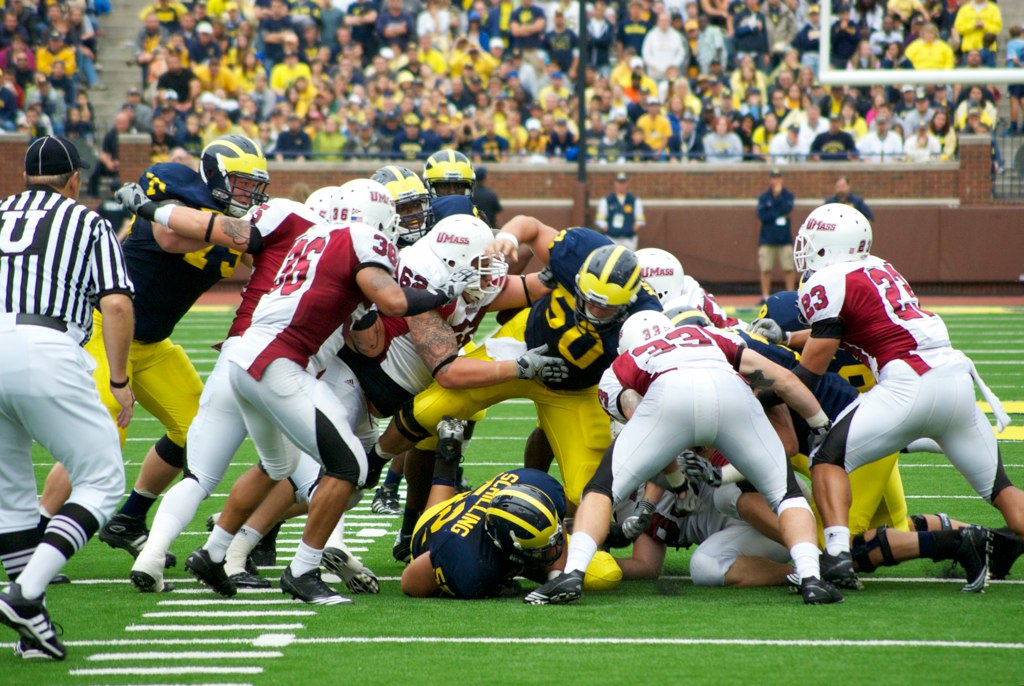
The University of Massachusetts Minuteman playing against the Michigan Wolverines in 2010.

UMass is a member of Division I of the National Collegiate Athletic Association (NCAA). The university is a member of the Mid-American Conference while playing ice hockey in the Hockey East Association.

In 2012, the football team joined the Mid-American Conference (MAC), to compete in the Football Bowl Subdivision (FBS; college football's highest level) with games played at Gillette Stadium. In March 2014, the MAC and UMass announced an agreement for the Minutemen football team to leave the conference after the 2015 season due to UMass declining an offer to become a full member of the conference. In the agreement between the MAC and the university, there was a contractual clause that had UMass playing in the MAC as a football-only member for two more seasons if UMass declined a full membership offer. UMass announced that it would look for a "more suitable conference" for the team. UMass was unable to find a "suitable conference" for nearly a decade, remaining a full A-10 member and becoming an FBS independent, but during the early-2020s conference realignment entered into membership discussions with both the MAC and Conference USA. On February 29, 2024, it was announced that UMass would join the MAC as a full member, including football, in July 2025.

UMass's teams were originally known as the Aggies, later the Statesmen, then the Redmen. In a response to changing attitudes regarding the use of Native American–themed mascots, they changed their mascot in 1972 to the Minuteman, based on the historical "minuteman" relationship with Massachusetts; women's teams and athletes are known as Minutewomen.

The UMass Amherst Department of Athletics currently sponsors men's intercollegiate baseball, basketball, cross country, ice hockey, football, lacrosse, soccer, swimming, and indoor and outdoor track & field. They also sponsor women's intercollegiate basketball, softball, cross country, rowing, lacrosse, soccer, swimming, field hockey, indoor and outdoor track & field, and tennis. Club sports offered which are not also offered at the varsity level are men's wrestling, men's rowing, men's tennis, women's ice hockey, men's and women's rugby, men's and women's bicycle racing, and men's and women's fencing. Men's and women's downhill skiing have been re-certified as club sports following the April 2, 2009, announcement of their discontinuation as varsity sports.

== Notable alumni ==
As of 2014, there were 243,628 University of Massachusetts Amherst alumni worldwide. Notable UMass Amherst alumni include Natalie Cole, Jeff Corwin, Bill Cosby, Massimo F. D'Angelo, Julius "Dr. J" Erving, Kenneth Feinberg, Mike Flanagan, Richard Gere, Greg Landry, Taj Mahal, Lawrence Mestel, William Monahan, David Pakman, Bill Paxton, Rick Pitino, Bill Pullman, Jeff Reardon, Buffy Sainte-Marie, Briana Scurry, Betty Shabazz, John F. Smith Jr., Jack Welch, and Jean Worthley.

Notable alumni

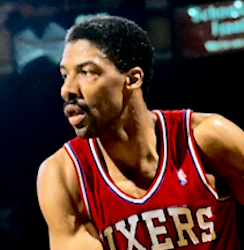
Julius Erving, Hall of Fame basketball player

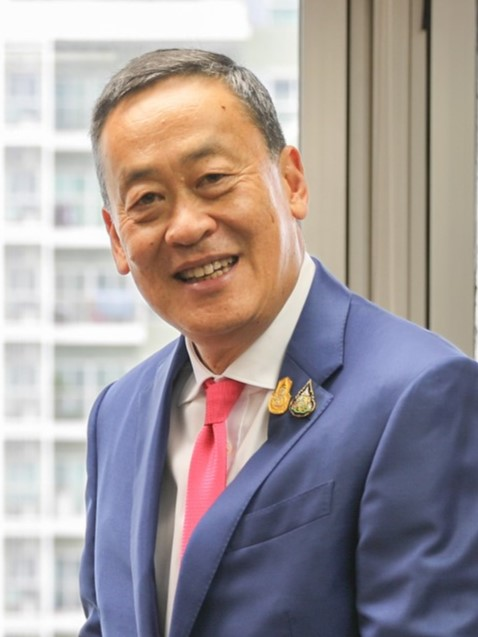
Srettha Thavisin, 30th Prime Minister of Thailand

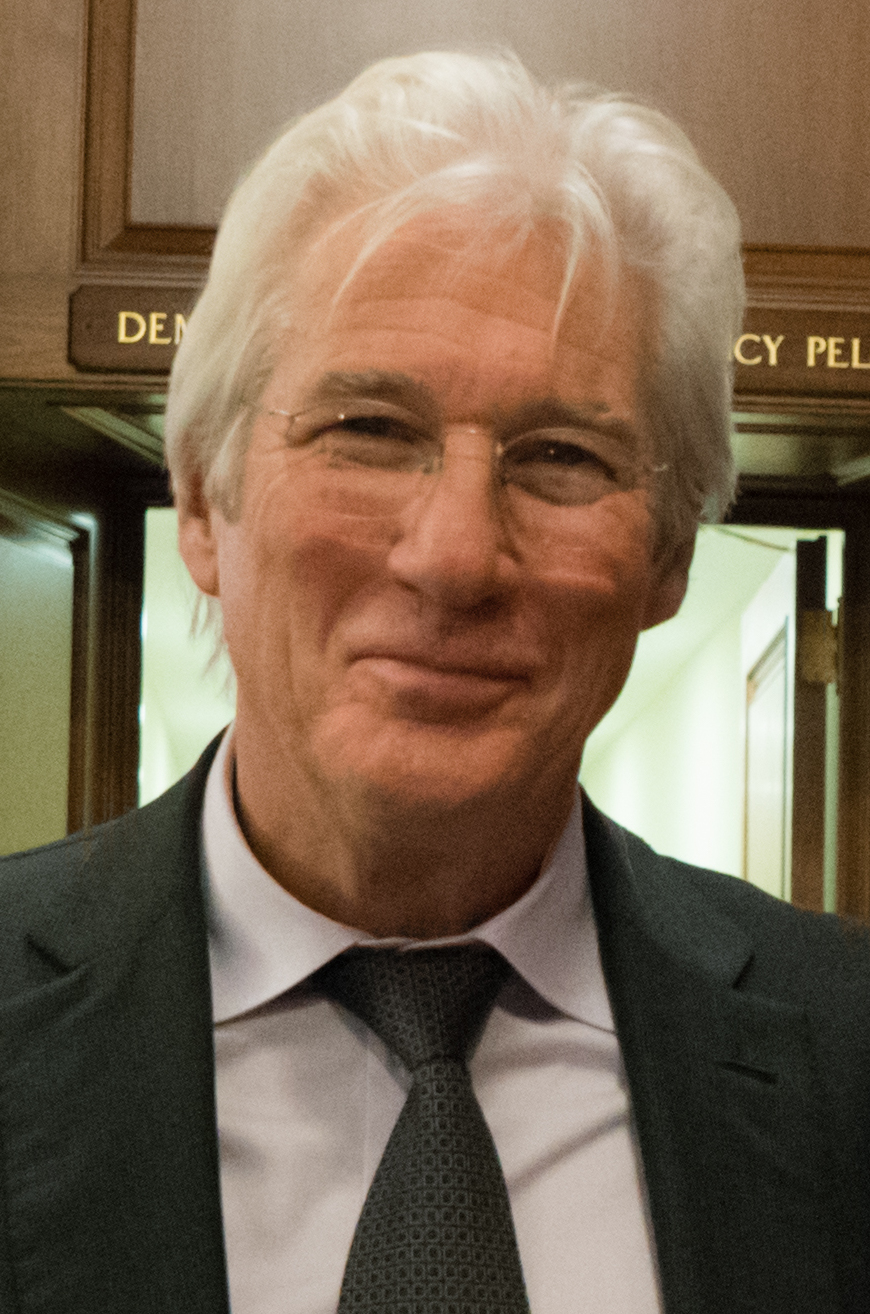
Richard Gere, Film actor and producer

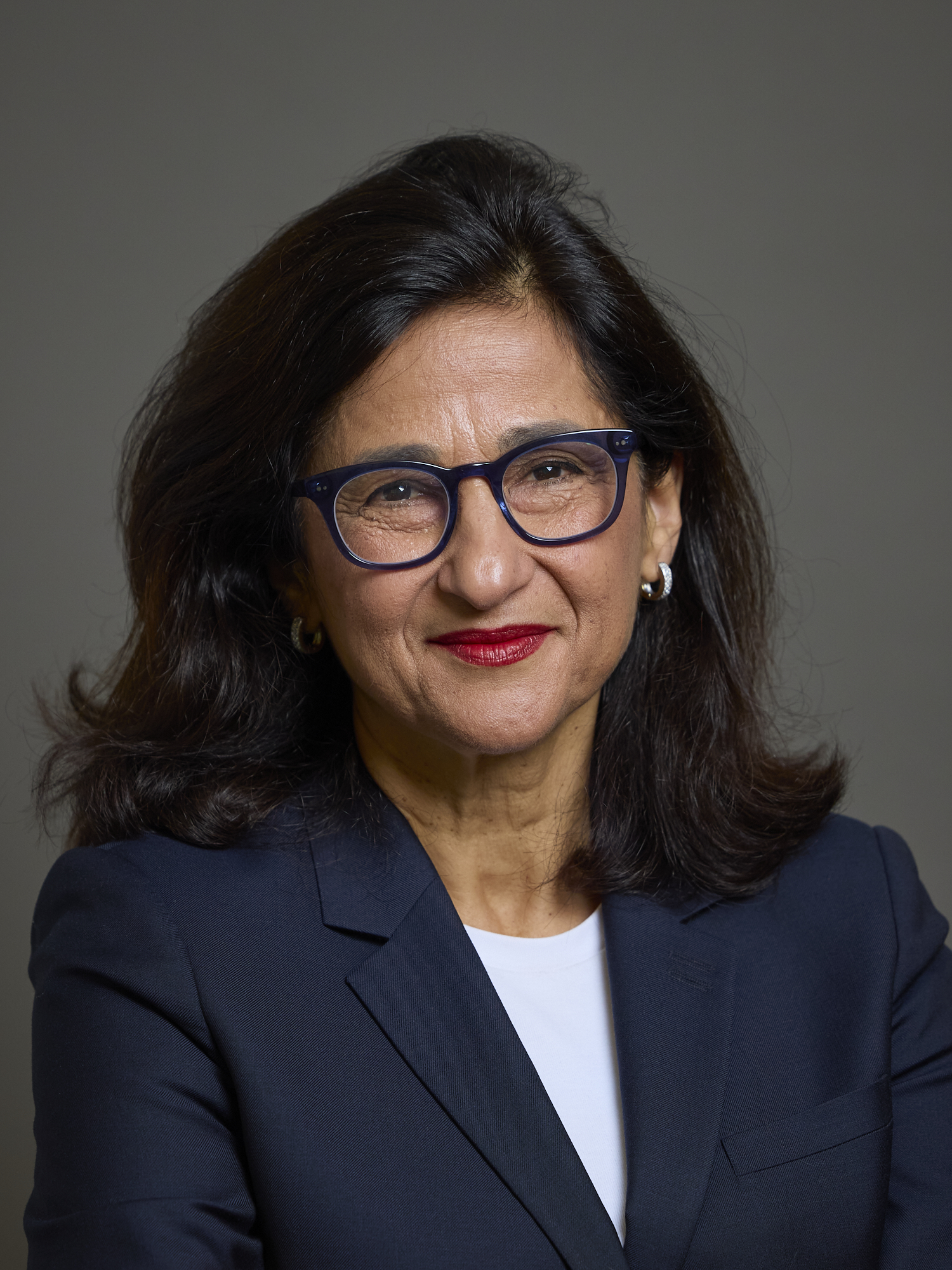
Minouche Shafik, 20th President of Columbia University

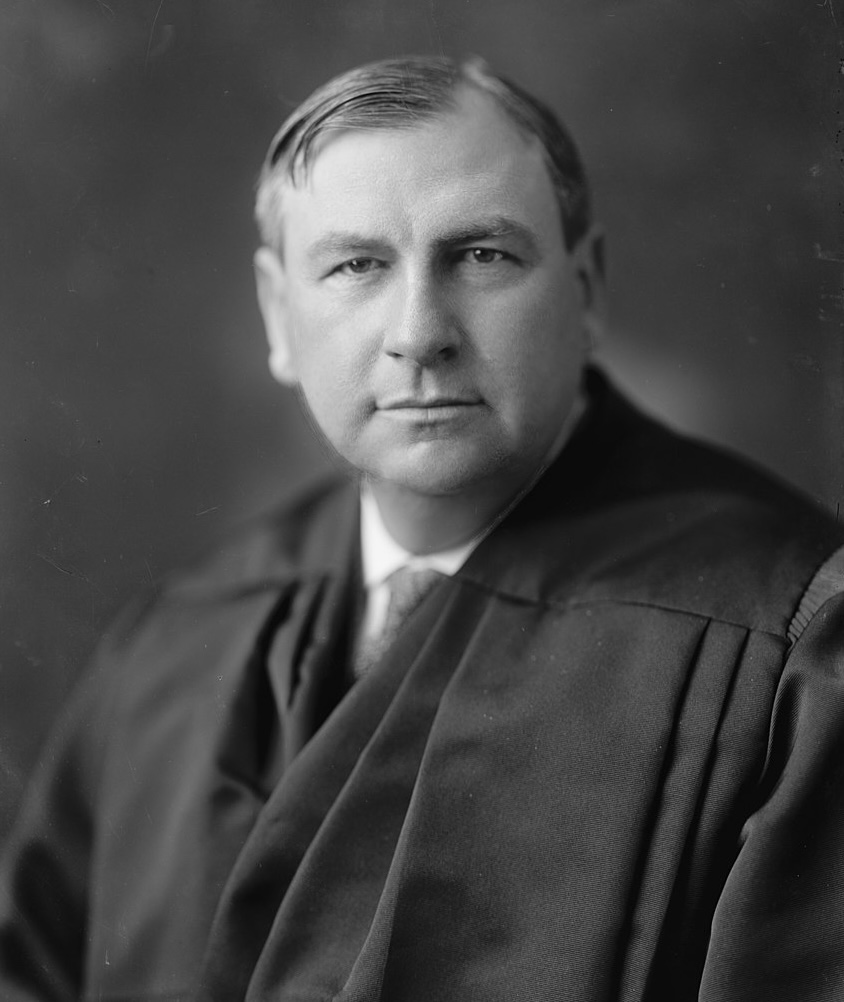
Harlan F. Stone (expelled), (Note: Harlan F. Stone was admitted as an undergraduate. He attended classes from 1888 to 1890 before being expelled.) 12th Chief Justice of the United States

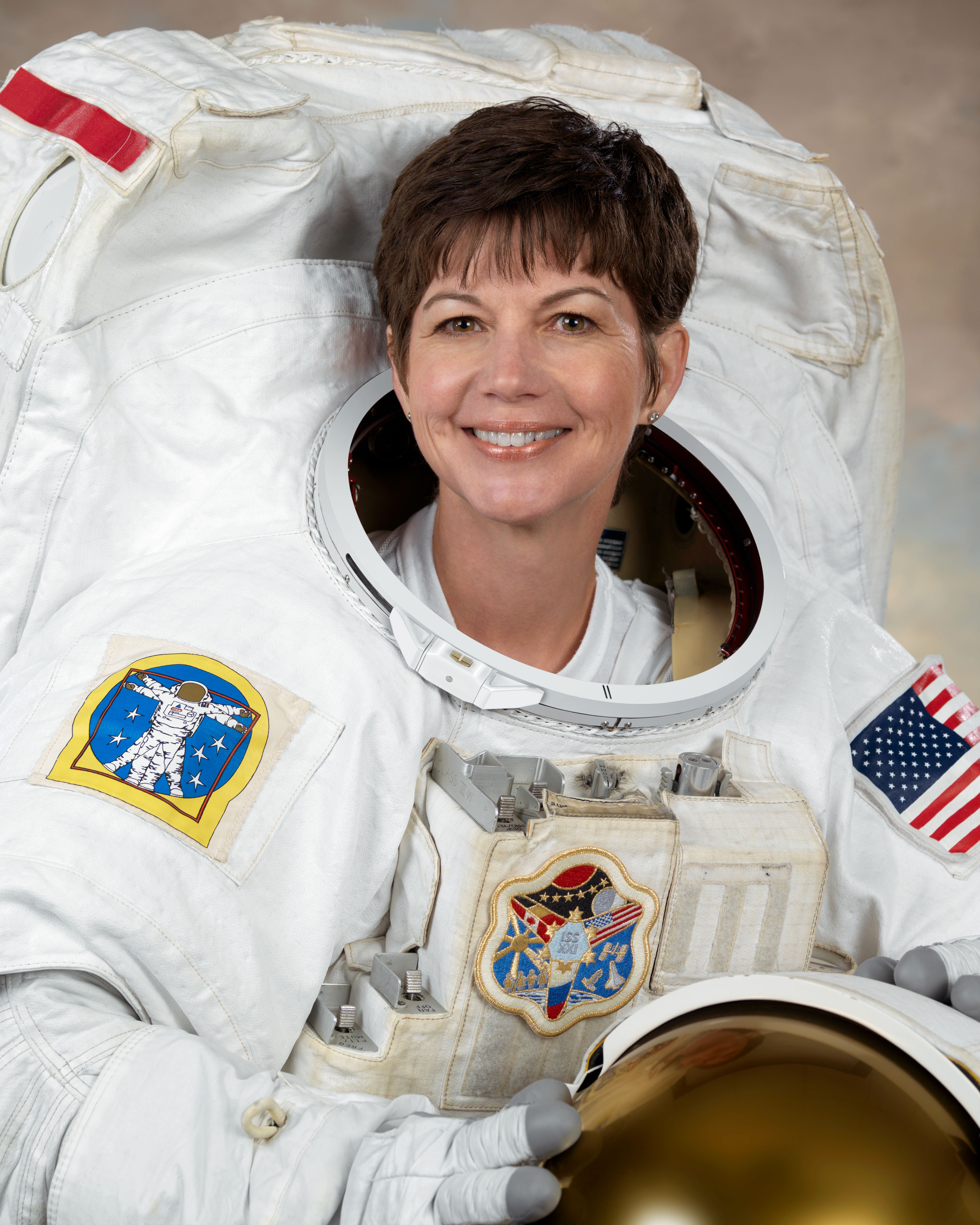
Catherine Coleman, retired NASA astronaut

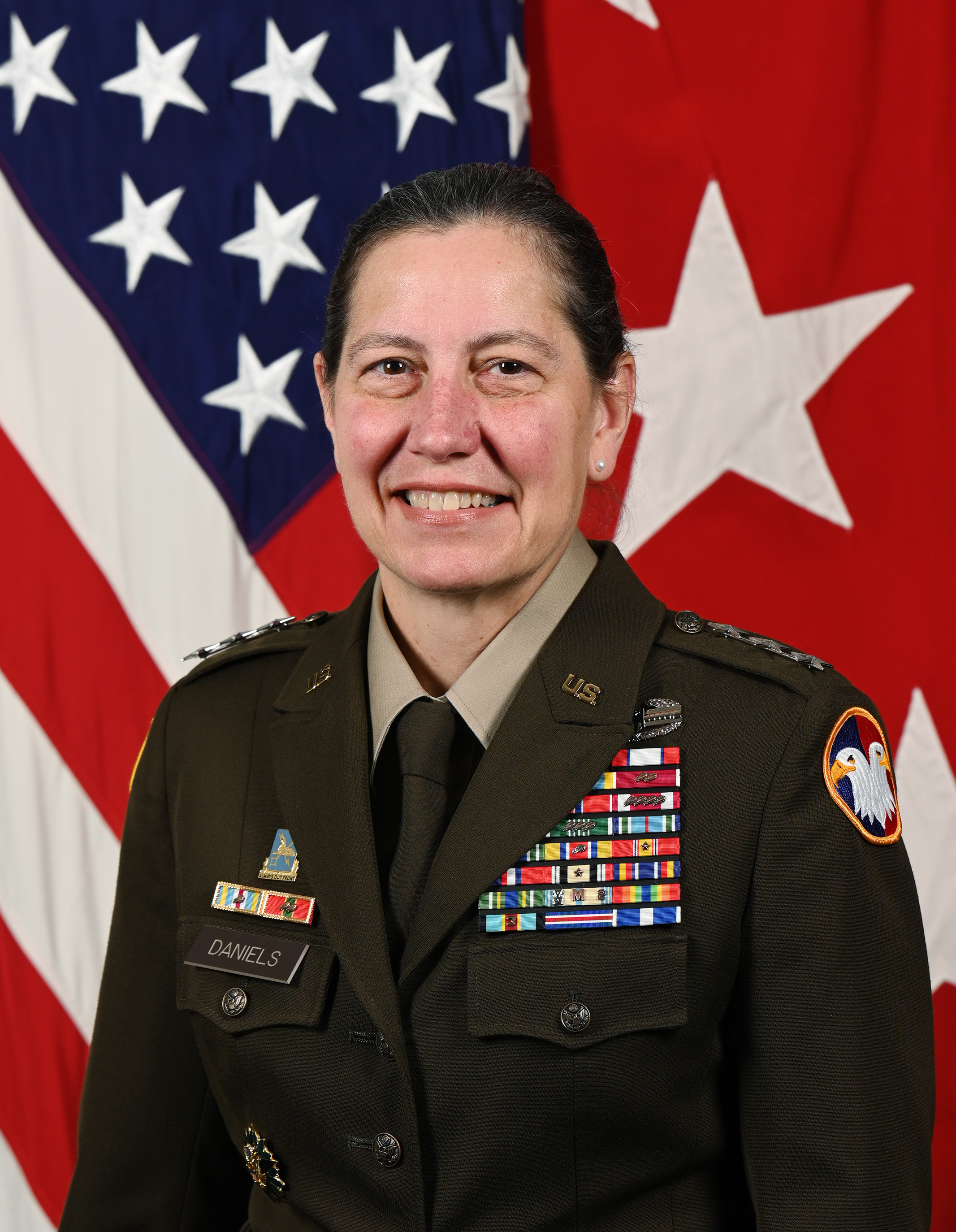
Jody Daniels, 34th Chief of the United States Army Reserve

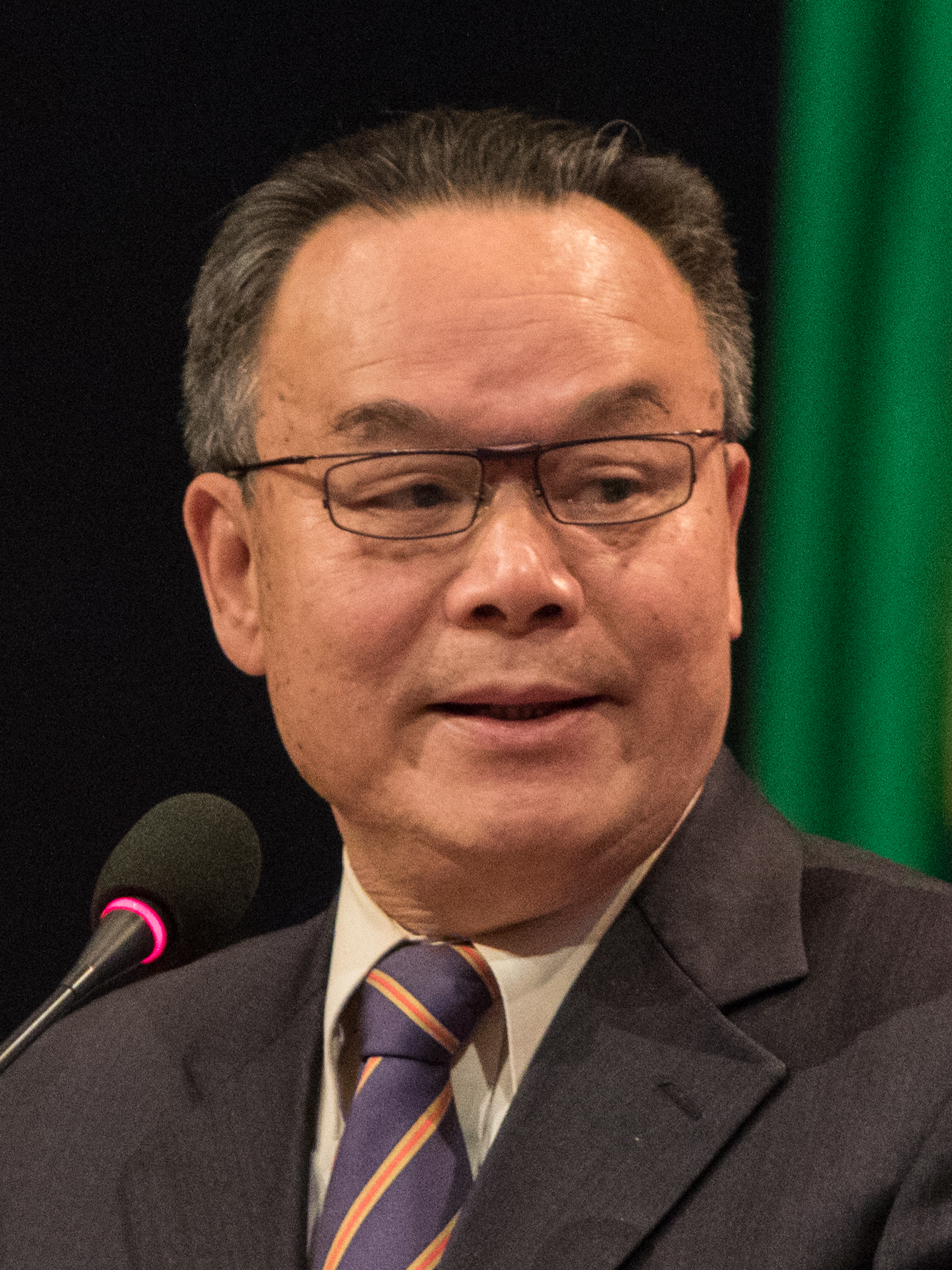
Zhou Qifeng, 10th President of Peking University

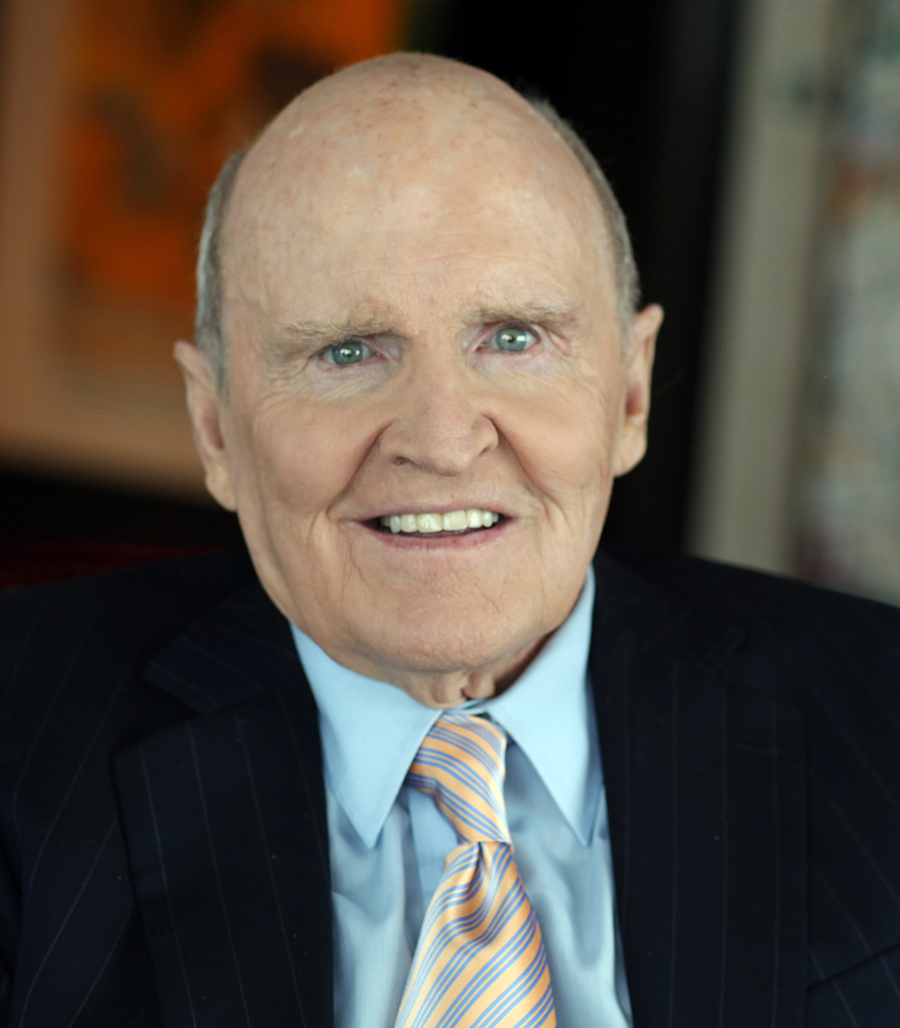
Jack Welch (BSc 1957, Hon DSc 1982), Former chairman and CEO of General Electric

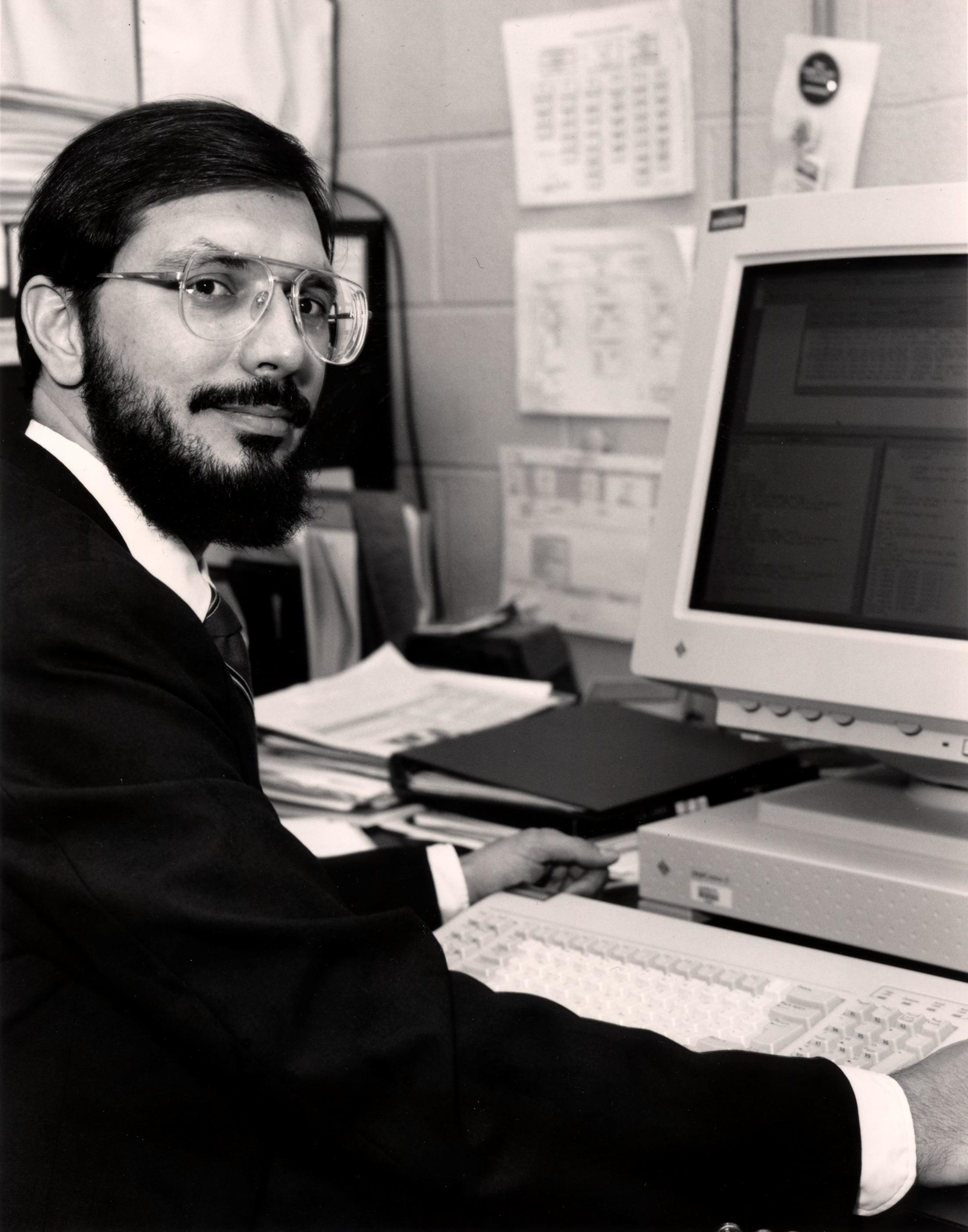
Russell Hulse (PhD 1975), Nobel Prize in Physics

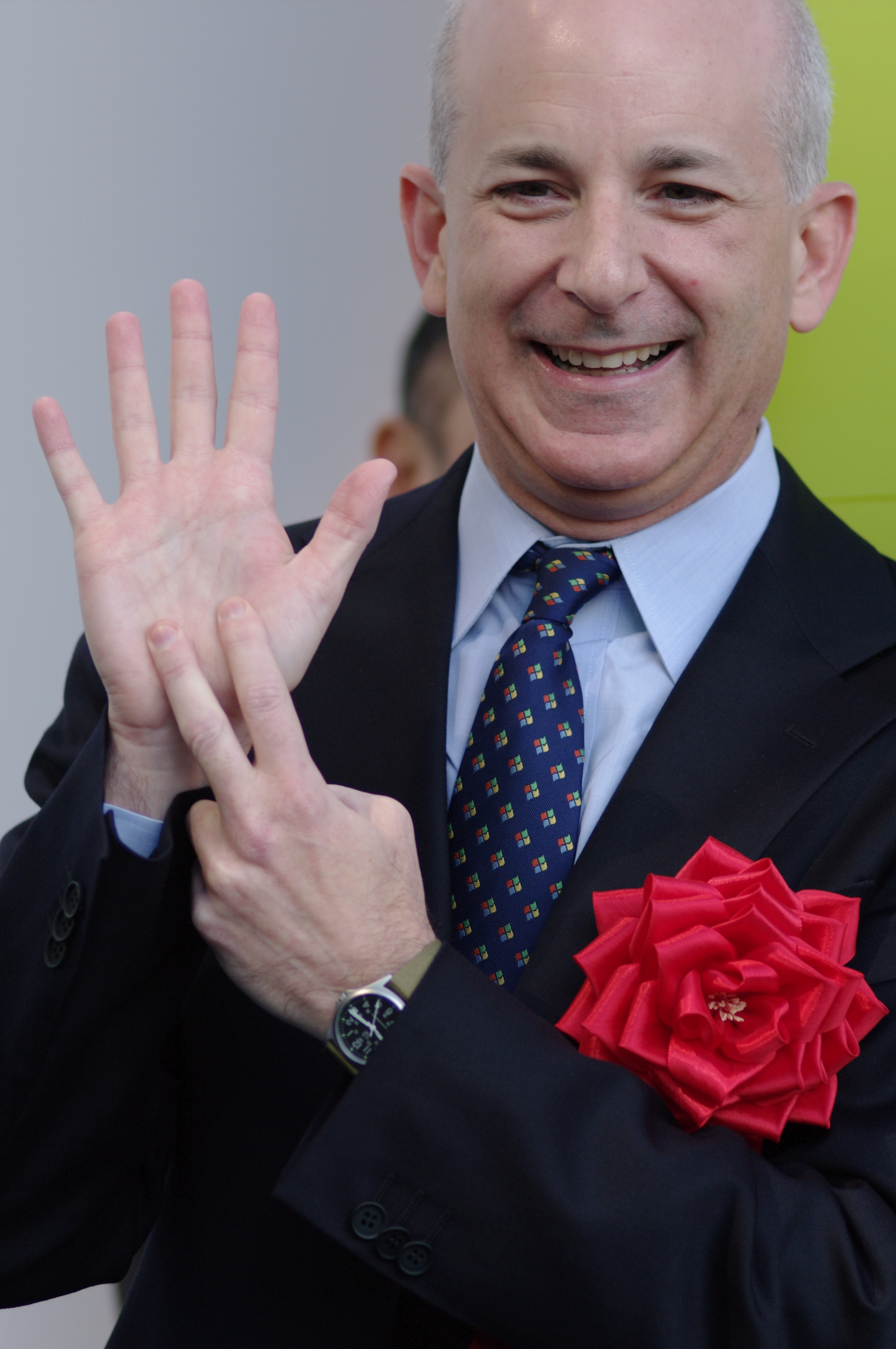
Steven Sinofsky, Former president of Windows at Microsoft

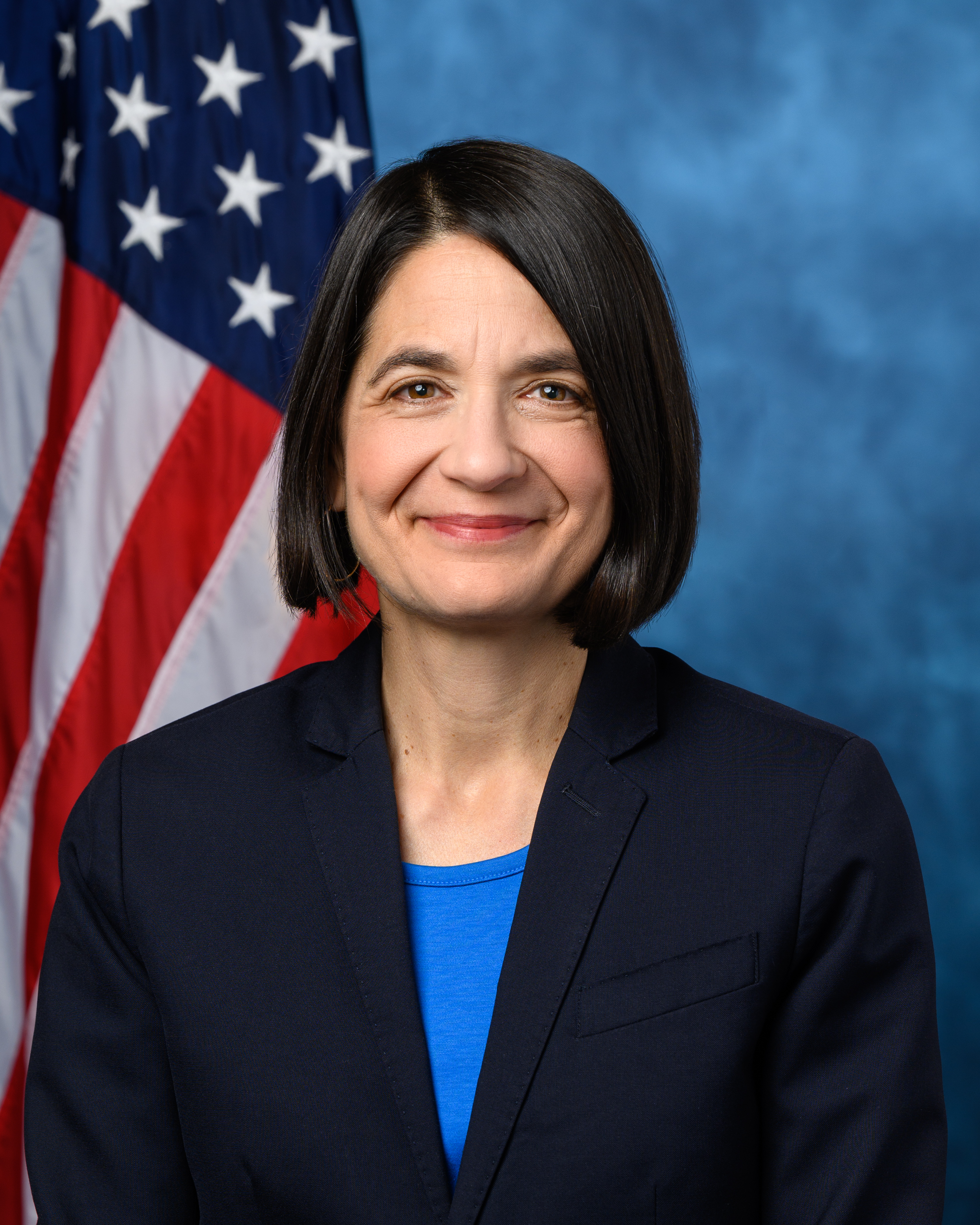
Becca Balint (MA 2001), U.S. representative for Vermont's at-large congressional district

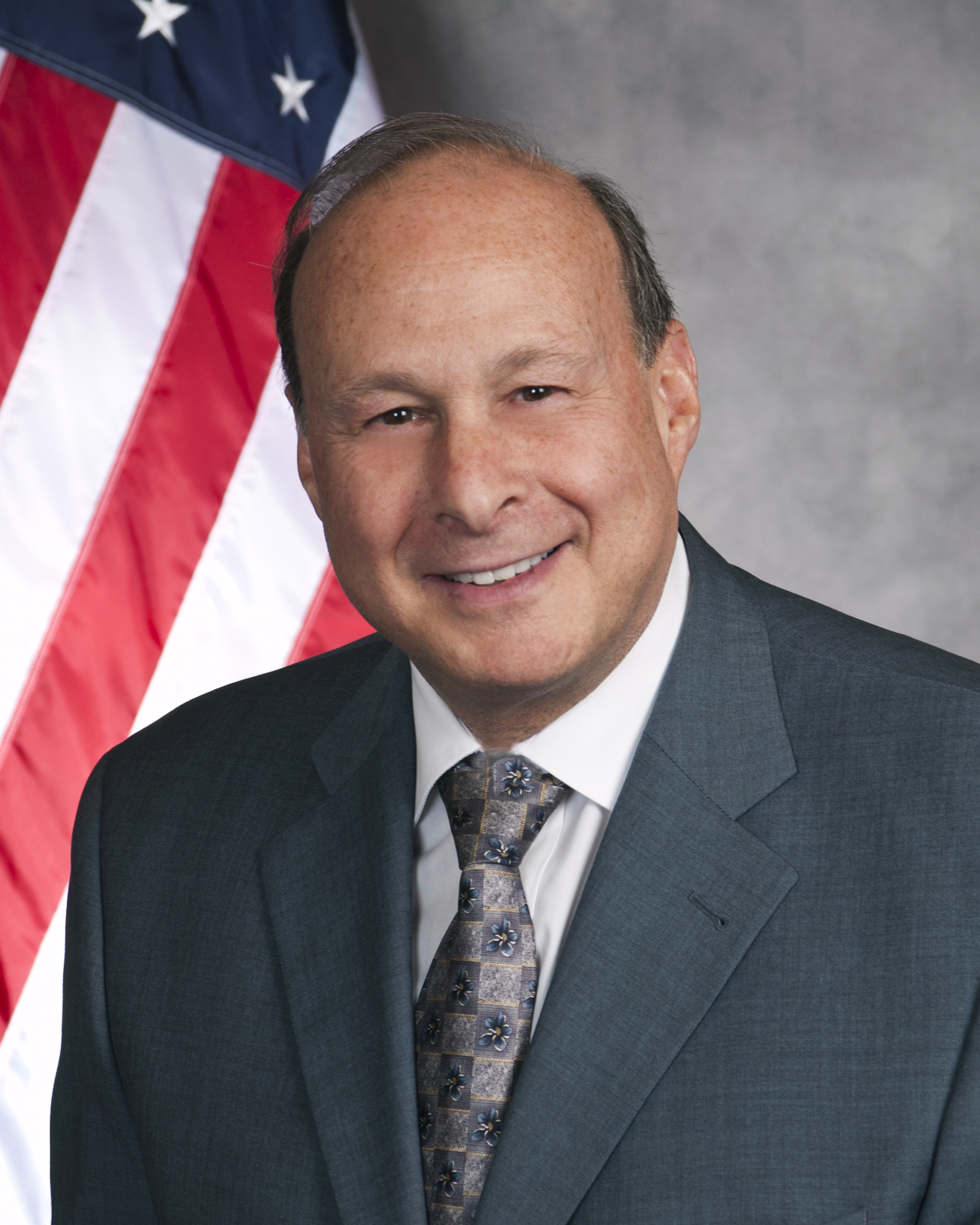
Stan Rosenberg, 93rd President of the Massachusetts Senate

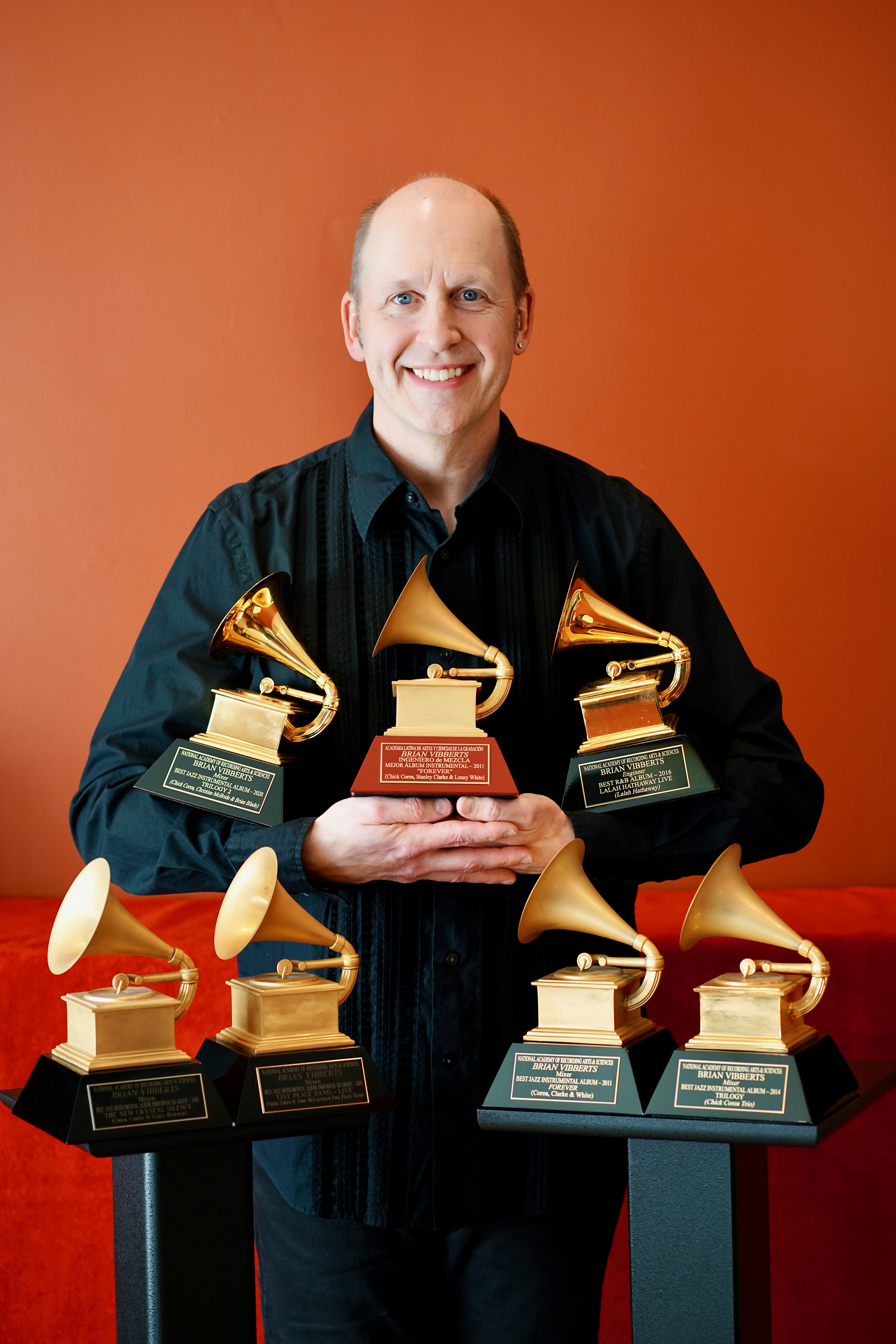
Brian Vibberts, 7x Grammy Award winner

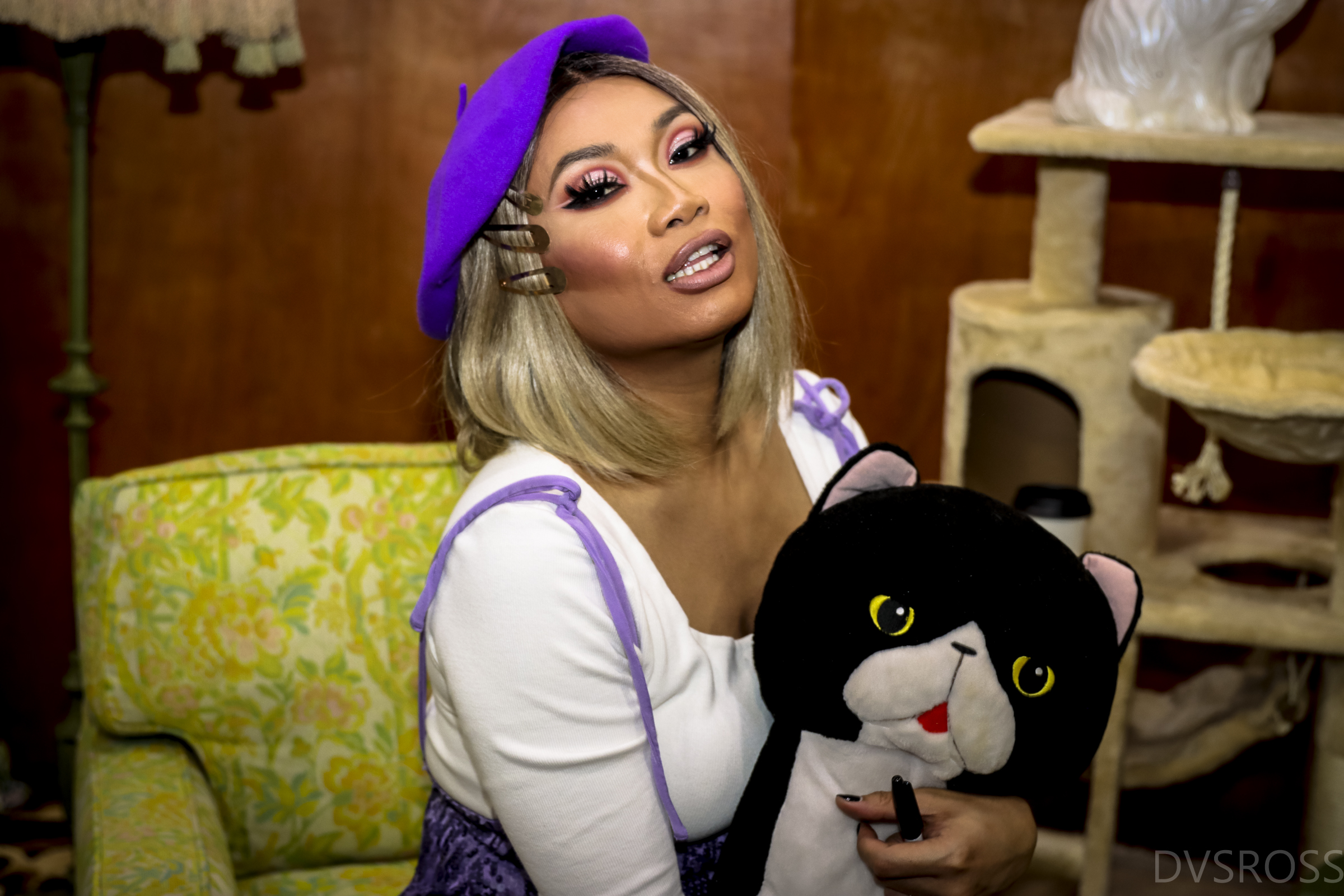
Jujubee, finalist on the second season of RuPaul’s Drag Race

== Notable faculty and staff ==
Notable faculty have included Robert Epstein, John Wideman, Samuel Bowles, Sheila Bair, the former chairman of the US Federal Deposit Insurance Corporation; Chuck Close, celebrated photorealist; Samuel R. Delany, author and critic; Vincent Dethier, pioneer physiologist; Ted Hughes, British poet laureate; Max Roach, jazz drummer; Lynn Margulis, famed biologist; Stephen Resnick and Richard D. Wolff, heterodox economists; James Tate, Pulitzer Prize–winning poet; and Robert Paul Wolff, in both philosophy and African-American studies. Current faculty of note include poet Peter Gizzi, poet Ocean Vuong, media critic Sut Jhally, and feminist economist Nancy Folbre.

== See also ==
- University of Massachusetts Amherst Department of Food Science
- William P. Brooks (1851–1938), professor, eighth president of the Massachusetts Agricultural College, and second vice president of Sapporo Agricultural College, Japan
