= List of University of Massachusetts Amherst faculty =

This list catalogs notable University of Massachusetts Amherst faculty.

Name	Subject	Born-died	Position
E. Wayne Abercrombie	Music	1938–	Professor emeritus of Music, director of Choral Programs
Charles Paul Alexander	Entomology	1889–1981	Professor of Entomology
James Allan	Computer Science		Associate dean of Research & Engagement, Distinguished Professor
Christian Appy	History	1955–	Professor of History
Lee Badgett	Economics	1960–	Economist
Sheila Bair	Business	1954–	Dean's Professor of Financial Regulatory Policy
Andrew Barto	Computer Science	1948–	Professor of Computer Science, chair of Computer Science Department
Madeleine Blais	Journalism	1946–	Professor of Journalism
Samuel Bowles	Economics	1939–	Professor emeritus of Microeconomics
Daniela Calzetti	Astronomy		Professor of Astronomy
Ring Cardé	Entomology	1943–	Professor of Entomology
Kyle Cave	Psychology		Professor of Psychology
Miriam Usher Chrisman	History	1920–2008	Professor emerita of History
Chuck Close	Art	1940–	
Samuel R. Delany	Comparative Literature	1942–	Professor
Walter B. Denny	Art History		University Distinguished Professor of Art History
Vincent Dethier	Zoology, Entomology	1915–1993	Director of Neuroscience and Behavior Program, chair of Chancellor's Commission on Civility
Arindrajit Dube	Economics		Professor of Economics
Jean Bethke Elshtain	Political Science	1941–2013	
Martín Espada	English	1957–	Professor of Poetry
Fred Feldman	Philosophy	1941–	Professor emeritus of Philosophy
Carl R. Fellers	Food Science and Technology	1893–1960	Department of horticulture manufacturing
Ann Ferguson	Philosophy	1938–	Professor emerita of Philosophy and Women's Studies
Charles H. Fernald	Entomology	1838–1921	Professor of Natural Sciences, chair of Natural Sciences
Jane E. Fountain	Political Science		Professor of Political Science and Public Policy, director of National Center for Digital Government
Edwin Gentzler	Linguistics		Professor of Language, head of Translation Center
Gretchen Gerzina	English		Dean of Commonwealth Honors College and Paul Murray Kendall Chair in Biography
Charles Anthony Goessmann	Chemistry	1827–1910	President of Massachusetts Agricultural College
Sheldon Goldman	Political Science	1939–	Professor of Political Science
Laura Haas	Computer Science		Dean of the Manning College of Information and Computer Sciences; spouse of Peter Haas
Peter J. Haas	Computer Science	1956–	Professor of Computer Science; spouse of Laura Haas
Ted Hughes	English	1930–1998	
Jane Humphries	Economics	1948–	Assistant professor of Economics
Neil Immerman	Computer Science	1953–	Professor of Computer Science
Sut Jhally	Communication	1955–	Professor of Communication
Angelika Kratzer	Linguistics		Professor emerita of Linguistics
Barbara Krauthamer	History		Professor of History, dean of the College of Humanities and Fine Arts
Jim Kurose	Computer Science	1956–	Professor of Computer Science
Joseph Levine	Philosophy	1952–	
Shona Macdonald	Art	1969–	Chair of the Department of Art
Lynn Margulis	Biological Science	1938–2011	Distinguished Professor of Botany, Biology, Geosciences
Valerie Martin	English	1938–	Professor of English
John McCarthy	Linguistics	1953–	Senior vice chancellor for Academic Affairs, provost
Warren McGuirk	Physical Education	1906–1981	Dean of the School of Physical Education, director of Athletics
William Hamilton Meeks, III	Mathematics	1947–	George David Birkoff Professor of Mathematics
Dick Minear	History	1938–	Professor of History
Paul Musgrave	Government		Assistant professor of Government
Anna Nagurney	Finance and Operations Management		Professor of Management (John F. Smith Memorial Professorship in the Isenberg School of Management)
Morihiko Nakahara	Music	1975–	Director of Orchestral Studies
Katja Oxman	Art	1942–	
George N. Parks	Music	1953–2010	Director of marching band
Barbara Partee	Linguistics	1940–	Professor emerita of Linguistics and Philosophy
Sanjay Raman	Electrical Engineering		Dean of the College of Engineering
Stephen Resnick	Economics	1938–2013	Professor of Economics
Max Roach	Music	1924–2007	
Thomas Schneeweis	Finance and Operations Management		Professor of Finance, Director of the Center for International Securities and Derivatives Markets
Archie Shepp	Music	1937–	
Kalidas Shetty	Food Science		
Anna Maria Siega-Riz	Public Health and Health Sciences		Dean of the School of Public Health and Health Sciences
Hava Siegelmann	Computer Science		Professor of Computer Science
Ramesh Sitaraman	Computer Science		Member of Computer Science Department
Marshall Harvey Stone	Mathematics	1903–1989	Professor of Mathematics
Boris Svistunov	Physics		Professor of Physics
James Tate	English	1943–2015	Professor of English
Joseph Hooton Taylor, Jr.	Astronomy	1941–	Professor of Astronomy, associate director of the Five College Radio Astronomy Observatory
Don Towsley	Computer Science	1949–	Distinguished Professor of Computer Science
Brian Vibberts	Audio Engineering		
Pablo Visconti	Reproductive biology		
Garrett L. Washington	History		Professor of History, Director of Diversity, Equity, and Inclusion
Frank A. Waugh	Landscape Architecture	1869–1943	Head of Agriculture Division
Michael Wex	Economics	1954–	
Richard D. Wolff	Philosophy, African-American Studies	1942–	Professor emeritus of Economics
Ethan Zuckerman	Public Policy, Communication, Information	1973–	Associate professor of Public Policy, Communication, and Information
