= List of research groups at the University of Massachusetts Amherst =

The following is a list of research labs and centers located at the University of Massachusetts Amherst:

- Antennas and Propagation Laboratory (Electrical and Computer Engineering)
- Apiary Laboratory (Entomology, Microbiology)
- Architecture and Real Time Laboratory (Electrical and Computer Systems Engineering)
- Autonomous Learning Laboratory (Computer Science)
- Center for Advanced Sensor and Communication Antennas (CASCA) (Electrical and Computer Engineering)
- Center for Applied Mathematics and Mathematical Computation (Mathematics)
- Center for Economic Development
- Center for Education Policy
- Center for Energy Efficiency and Renewable Energy (Mechanical and Industrial Engineering)
- Center for Geometry, Analysis, Numerics, and Graphics (Mathematics)
- Center for Intelligent Information Retrieval (Computer Science)
- Center for Public Policy and Administration
- Center for e-design
- Complex Systems Modeling and Control Laboratory (Electrical and Computer Systems Engineering)
- Emerging Electronics Laboratory (Electrical and Computer Systems Engineering)
- Engineering Research Center for Collaborative Adaptive Sensing of the Atmosphere (Electrical and Computer Systems Engineering)
- Feedback Control Systems Lab (Electrical and Computer Systems Engineering)
- Information Systems Laboratory (Electrical and Computer Systems Engineering)
- Knowledge Discovery Laboratory (Computer Science)
- Labor Relations and Research Center
- Laboratory For Perceptual Robotics (Computer Science)
- Laboratory for Millimeter Wavelength Devices and Applications (Electrical and Computer Systems Engineering)
- Massachusetts Center for Renewable Energy Science and Technology
- Microwave Remote Sensing Laboratory (MIRSL)(Electrical and Computer Systems Engineering)
- Multimedia Networks Laboratory (Electrical and Computer Systems Engineering)
- Multimedia Networks and Internet Laboratory (Electrical and Computer Systems Engineering)
- Nanoscale Computing Fabrics Lab (Electrical and Computer Systems Engineering)
- National Center for Digital Governance
- Network Systems Laboratory (Electrical and Computer Systems Engineering)
- Political Economy Research Institute
- Reconfigurable Computing Laboratory (Electrical and Computer Systems Engineering)
- Scientific Reasoning Research Institute
- Soil Mechanics Laboratories (located at Marston Hall and ELAB-II)
- Terahertz Laboratory (Electrical and Computer Systems Engineering)
- The Environmental Institute
- VLSI CAD Laboratory (Electrical and Computer Systems Engineering)
- VLSI Circuits and Systems Laboratory (Electrical and Computer Systems Engineering)
- Virtual Center for Supernetworks
- Wind Energy Center (formerly the Renewable Energy Research Laboratory) (Mechanical and Industrial Engineering)
- Wireless Systems Laboratory (Electrical and Computer Systems Engineering)
- Yield and Reliability of VLSI Circuits (Electrical and Computer Systems Engineering)
