= List of research centers at the University of Massachusetts Amherst =

The following is a list of some research labs at the University of Massachusetts Amherst:

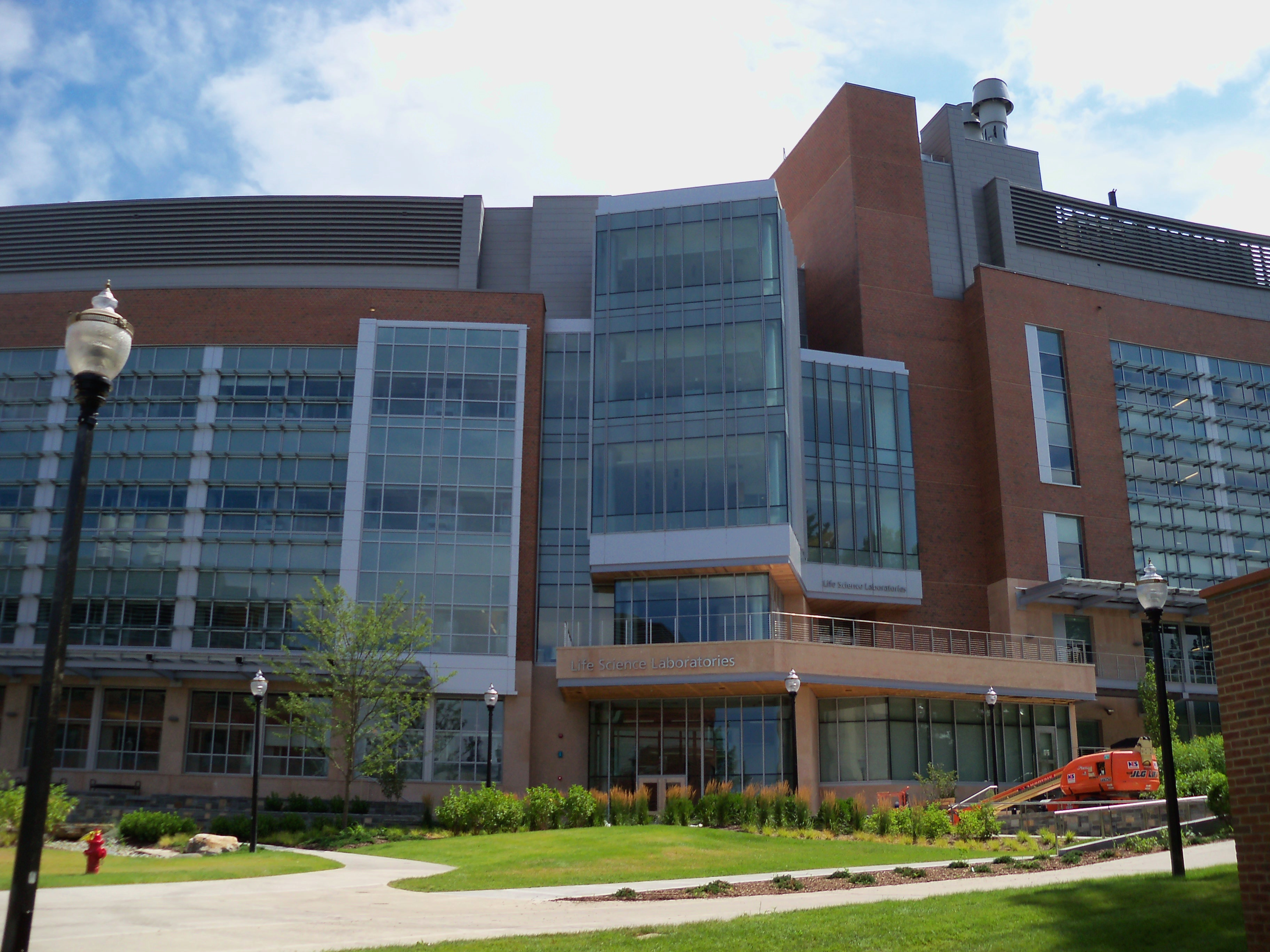
Life Sciences Laboratory

== College of Natural Sciences ==
- Apiary Laboratory (entomology, microbiology)
- Genomic Resource Laboratory (molecular biology)
- Massachusetts Center for Renewable Energy Science and Technology
- Amherst Center for Fundamental Interactions (physics)
- Center for Applied Mathematics and Mathematical Computation
- Center for Geometry, Analysis, Numerics, and Graphics (www.gang.umass.edu)
- Pediatric Physical Activity Laboratory (PPAL)

== College of Engineering (CoE) ==
=== Electrical and Computer Engineering (ECE) labs ===
- Antennas and Propagation Laboratory
- Architecture and Real-Time Systems Laboratory
- Center for Advanced Sensor and Communication Antennas (CASCA)
- Complex Systems Modeling and Control Laboratory
- Emerging Nanoelectronics Laboratory
- Engineering Research Center for Collaborative Adaptive Sensing of the Atmosphere (CASA)
- Feedback Control Systems Lab
- High-Dimensional Signal Processing Lab
- Information Systems Laboratory
- Integrated Nanobiotechnology Lab
- Laboratory for Millimeter Wavelength Devices and Applications
- Microwave Remote Sensing Laboratory (MIRSL)
- Multimedia Networks Laboratory
- Multimedia Networks and Internet Laboratory
- Nanodevices and Integrated Systems Laboratory
- Nanoelectronics Theory and Simulation Laboratory
- Nanoscale Computing Fabrics & Cognitive Architectures Lab
- Network Systems Laboratory
- Photonics Laboratory
- Reconfigurable Computing Laboratory
- Sustainable Computing Lab
- VLSI CAD Laboratory
- VLSI Circuits and Systems Laboratory
- Wireless Systems Laboratory
- Yield and Reliability of VLSI Circuits

=== Mechanical and Industrial Engineering (MIE) Labs ===
- Arbella Insurance Human Performance Laboratory (Engineering Laboratory Building)
- Center for Energy Efficiency and Renewable Energy
- Multi-Phase Flow Simulation Laboratory
- Soil Mechanics Laboratories (located at Marston Hall and ELAB-II)
- Wind Energy Center (formerly the Renewable Energy Research Laboratory)

== College of Information & Computer Sciences (CICS) ==
- Autonomous Learning Laboratory
- Center for Intelligent Information Retrieval
- Center for e-Design
- Knowledge Discovery Laboratory
- Laboratory For Perceptual Robotics
- Resource-Bounded Reasoning Laboratory

== Other ==
- Center for Economic Development
- Center for Education Policy
- Institute for Applied Life Sciences
- Labor Relations and Research Center
- National Center for Digital Governance
- Political Economy Research Institute
- Scientific Reasoning Research Institute
- The Environmental Institute
- Virtual Center for Supernetworks
