= East Ridge Historical Area =

Area on the campus of UMass Amherst, US

Coordinates: 42°23′23.45″N 72°31′20.97″W

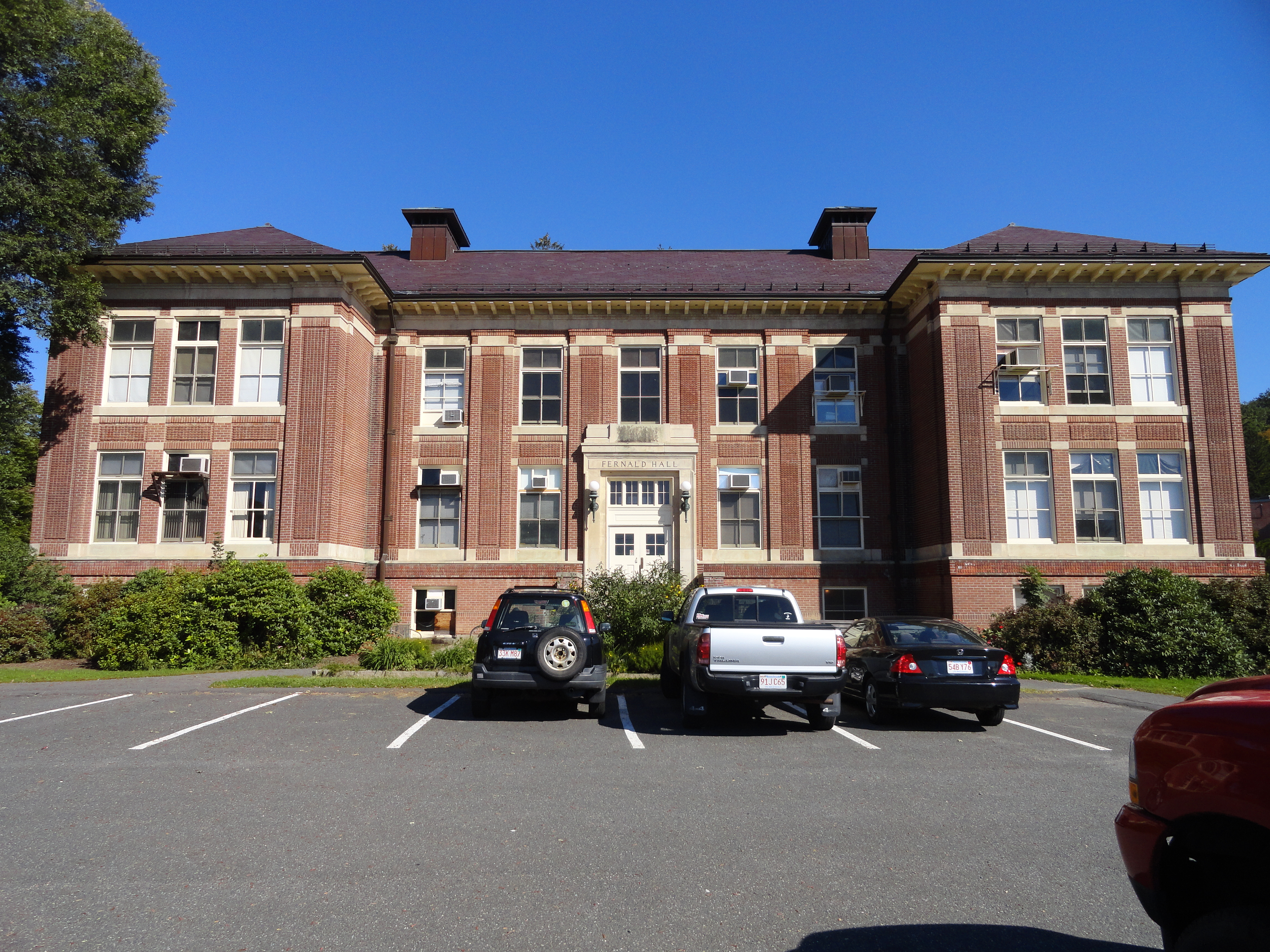
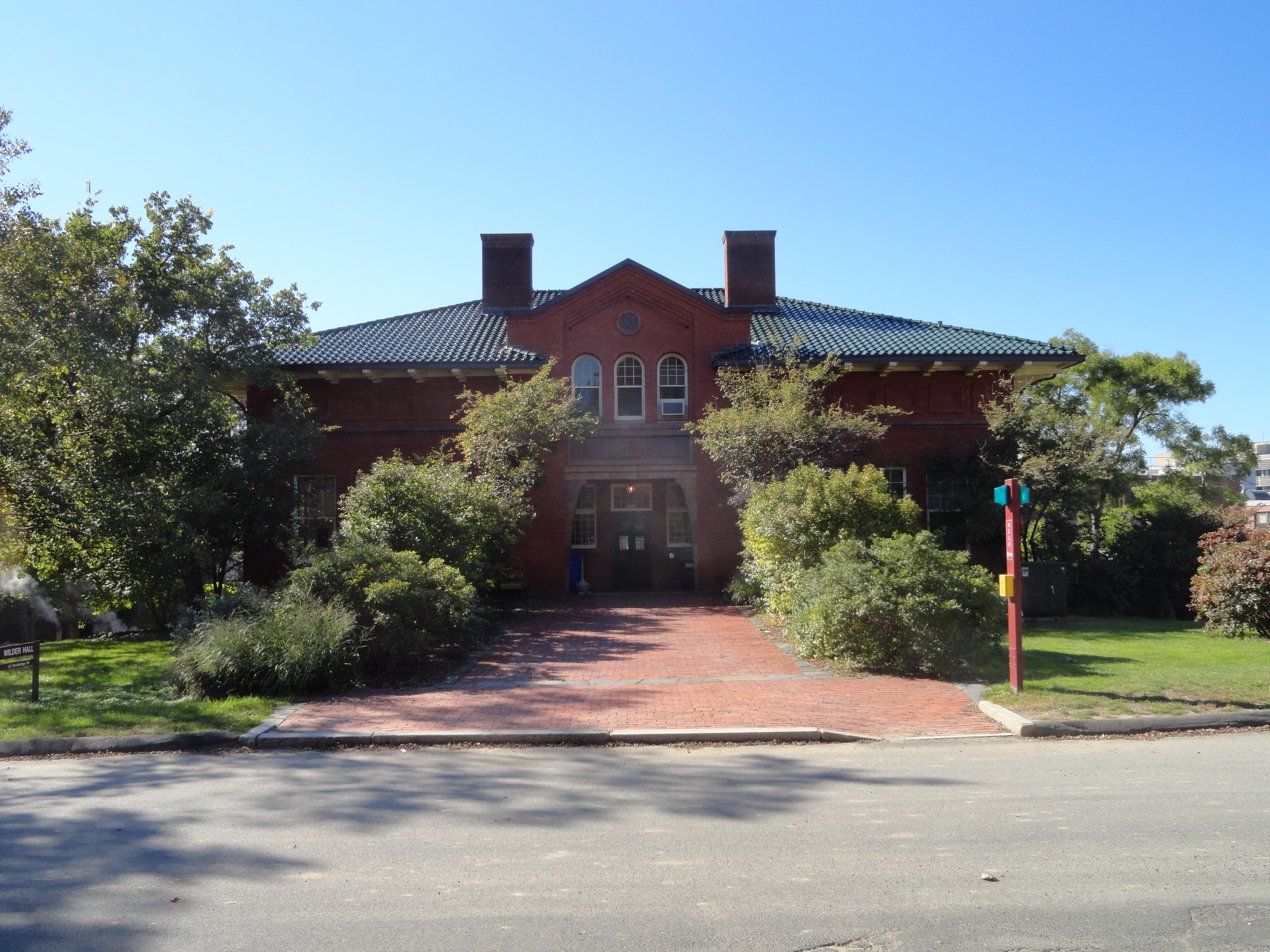
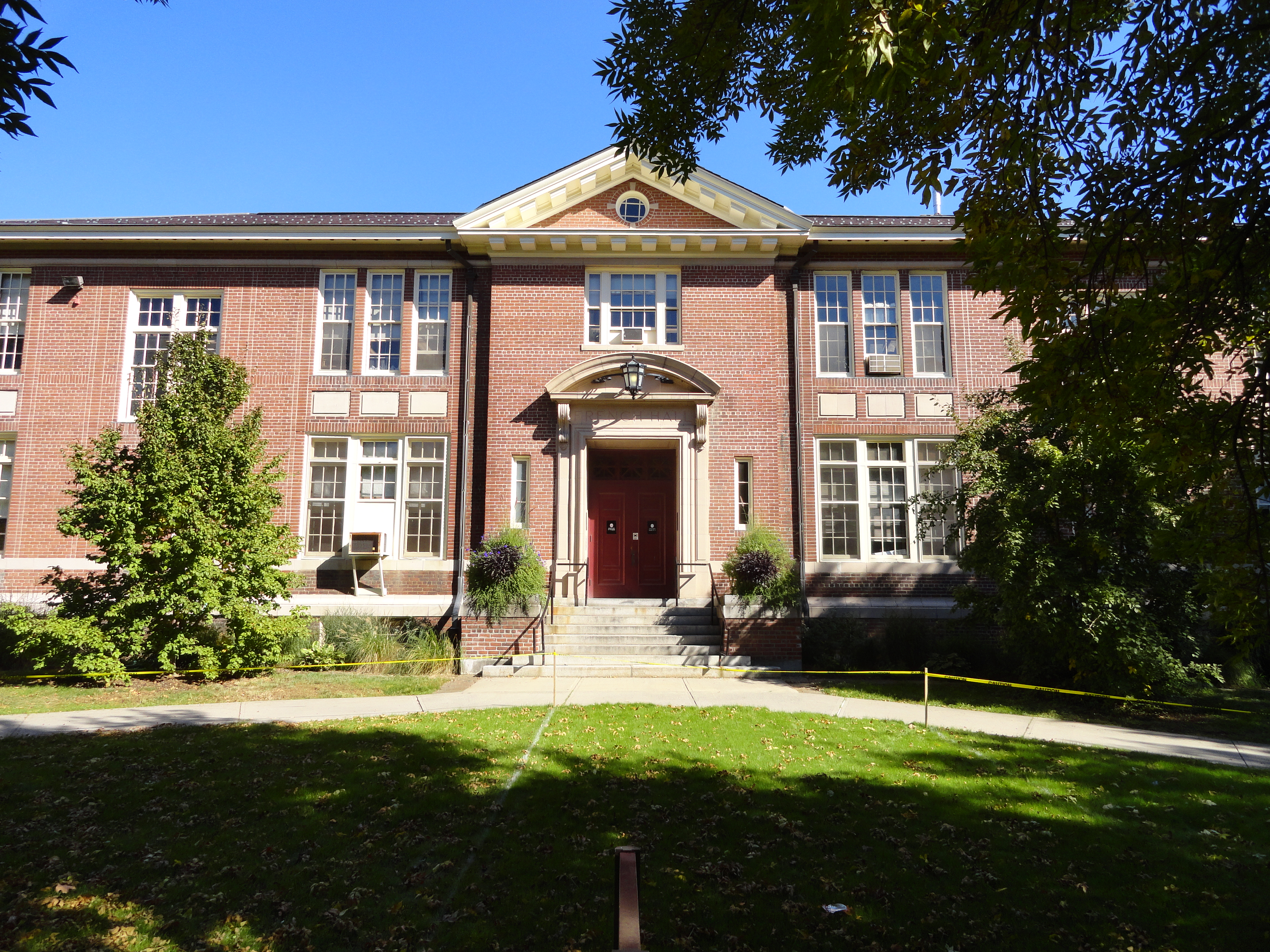
From left to right: Fernald Hall, French Hall, and Wilder Hall.

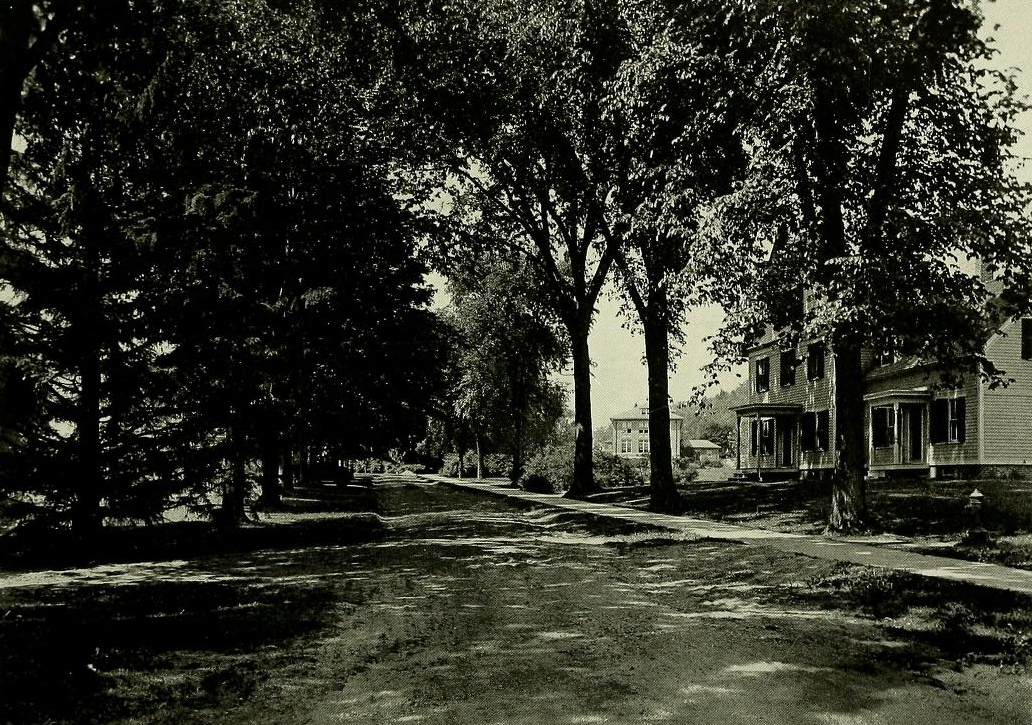
Stockbridge Road, c. 1923. In the foreground is the former Insectary and math building, French Hall can be seen in the distance.

The East Ridge Historical Area of UMass Amherst consists of several of the older lecture halls on campus, primarily those used by the entomology, plant pathology and other natural science programs. These buildings were originally located adjacent to the campus orchard where the Central Residential Area currently stands today. The district consists mainly of lecture halls that were built prior to the First World War by the Massachusetts Agricultural College; however, it is also home to the Boltwood-Stockbridge House, the oldest house in Amherst.

== Historic buildings ==
- Apiary Laboratory
- Boltwood-Stockbridge House
- Clark Hall
- Fernald Hall
- French Hall
  - French Hall Greenhouse
- Homestead House
- Wilder Hall

== Other buildings ==
- Durfee Conservatory
- Franklin Dining Commons
- Hills Hall
- Morrill Science Center
- Studio Arts Building

== Former buildings ==
- Fisher Laboratory
- Insectary
- Marshall Hall
  - Marshall Hall Annex
