= Marshall Hall (Amherst, Massachusetts) =

Coordinates: 42°23′30.77″N 72°31′25.87″W

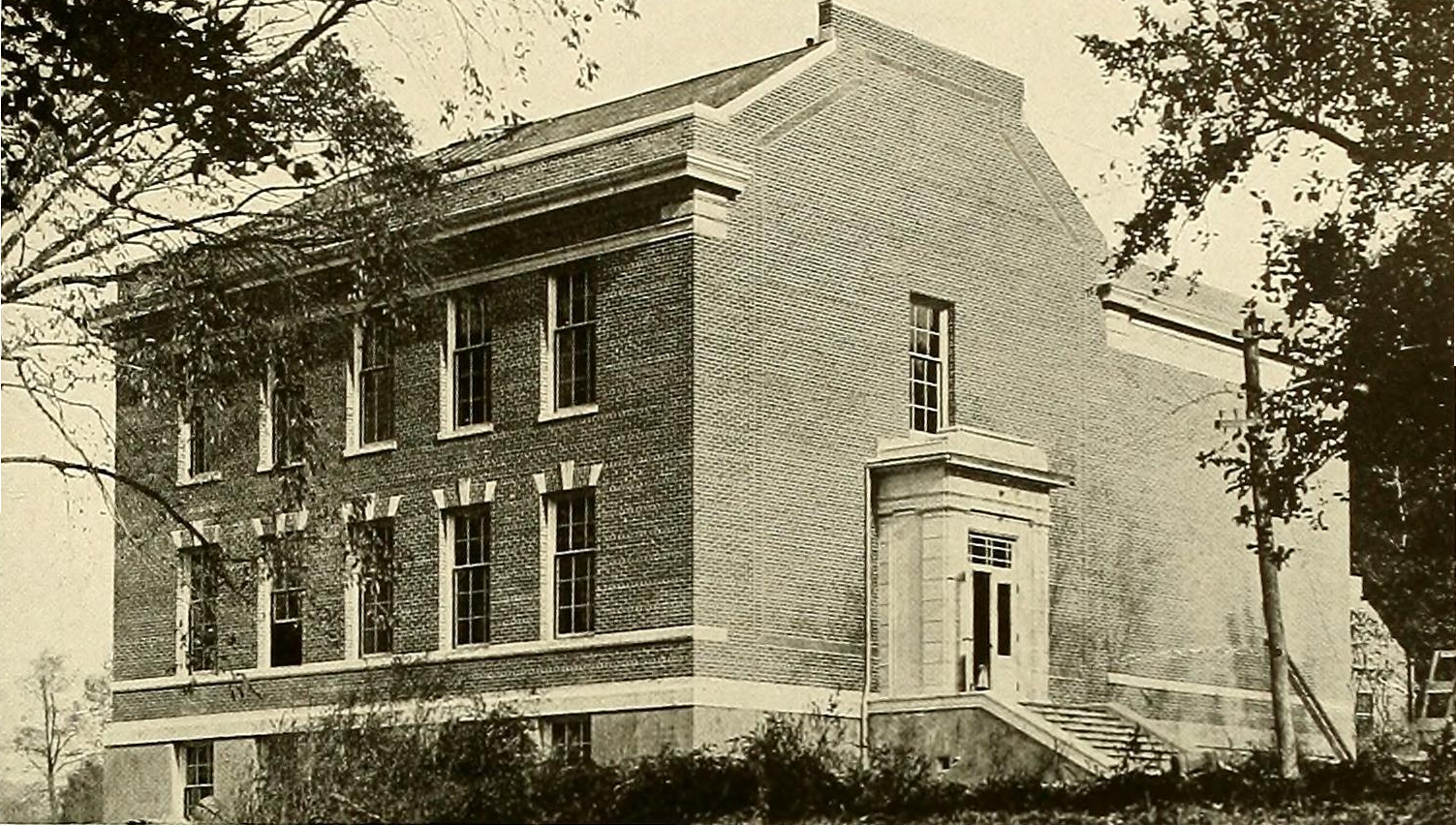
- Marshall Hall, circa 1917.
- Interactive map of the Marshall Hall area
- Alternative names: Marshall Laboratory; Microbiology Building; Microbiology Laboratory

General information
- Type: Academic offices, classrooms, research laboratories
- Architectural style: Georgian Revival
- Construction started: 1915
- Completed: 1916
- Demolished: 1996

Technical details
- Floor count: 3

Marshall Hall, otherwise known as Marshall Laboratory, was the first microbiology laboratory at the University of Massachusetts Amherst. Constructed in 1916, it housed the college's microbiology department for a number of years, and was used extensively for bacteriology classes and research. The building was named for Dr. Charles Edward Marshall, the first professor of microbiology at the college, a director of the graduate school, and editor of a textbook on the subject, considered "a standard text for many years." As the microbiology department grew with the university, it soon became necessary for additional research laboratory space. In 1947 the Marshall Hall Annex was placed adjacent to the building; the annex was a former army barrack from Westover Army Airfield in Chicopee, and would continue to be used as a classroom space long after the demolition of its brick cohort. With the expansion and removal of the microbiology department to the Morrill Science Center, and years of substandard maintenance, the original Marshall Hall building was demolished in 1996. The new Integrated Science and Laboratory Science buildings now stand at the site of former microbiology laboratory.

== See also ==
- East Ridge Historical Area
