= Clark Hall =

Clark Hall may refer to:

- John Richard Clark Hall, author of A Concise Anglo-Saxon Dictionary; it too is often called "Clark Hall"
- Clark Hall (politician), member of the Arkansas House of Representatives
- Clark Hall, University of Virginia, a library
- Clark Memorial Hall in Adrian, Michigan
- Clark Hall (UMass Amherst), a lecture hall and research laboratory in the East Ridge Historical Area at the University of Massachusetts Amherst
- Clark Hall, a contributing building within Flora Stone Mather College Historic District, Cleveland, Ohio
- Clark Hall, a residence hall at the University of North Texas, Texas

== See also ==
- Janet Clarke Hall, a residential college at the University of Melbourne
- Robert Clark-Hall (1883–1964), British air marshal
