= Walter Denny =

Walter Denny may refer to:

- Walter B. Denny, American historian
- Walter M. Denny (1853–1926), American politician
