= Chandy–Misra–Haas algorithm resource model =

The Chandy–Misra–Haas algorithm resource model checks for deadlock in a distributed system. It was developed by K. Mani Chandy, Jayadev Misra and Laura M. Haas.

== Locally dependent ==
Consider the n processes P_{1}, P_{2}, P_{3}, P_{4}, P_{5,}, ... ,P_{n} which are performed in a single system (controller). P_{1} is locally dependent on P_{n}, if P_{1} depends on P_{2}, P_{2} on P_{3,} so on and P_{n−1} on P_{n}. That is, if $P_1 \rightarrow P_2 \rightarrow P_3 \rightarrow \ldots \rightarrow P_n$, then $P_1$ is locally dependent on $P_n$. If P_{1} is said to be locally dependent to itself if it is locally dependent on P_{n} and P_{n} depends on P_{1}: i.e. if $P_1 \rightarrow P_2 \rightarrow P_3 \rightarrow \ldots \rightarrow P_n \rightarrow P_1$, then $P_1$ is locally dependent on itself.

== Description ==
The algorithm uses a message called probe(i,j,k) to transfer a message from controller of process P_{j} to controller of process P_{k}. It specifies a message started by process P_{i} to find whether a deadlock has occurred or not. Every process P_{j} maintains a boolean array dependent which contains the information about the processes that depend on it. Initially the values of each array are all "false".

=== Controller sending a probe ===
Before sending, the probe checks whether P_{j} is locally dependent on itself. If so, a deadlock occurs. Otherwise it checks whether P_{j}, and P_{k} are in different controllers, are locally dependent and P_{j} is waiting for the resource that is locked by P_{k}. Once all the conditions are satisfied it sends the probe.

=== Controller receiving a probe ===
On the receiving side, the controller checks whether P_{k} is performing a task. If so, it neglects the probe. Otherwise, it checks the responses given P_{k} to P_{j} and dependent_{k}(i) is false. Once it is verified, it assigns true to dependent_{k}(i). Then it checks whether k is equal to i. If both are equal, a deadlock occurs, otherwise it sends the probe to next dependent process.

== Algorithm ==
In pseudocode, the algorithm works as follows:

=== Controller sending a probe ===
if Pj is locally dependent on itself
    then declare deadlock
else for all Pj,Pk  such that
    (i) Pi is locally dependent on Pj,
    (ii) Pj is waiting for 'Pk and
    (iii) Pj, Pk are on different controllers.
send probe(i, j, k). to home site of Pk

=== Controller receiving a probe ===
if
    (i)Pk is idle / blocked
    (ii) dependentk(i) = false, and
    (iii) Pk has not replied to all requests of to Pj
then begin
    "dependents""k"(i) = true;
    if k == i
    then declare that Pi is deadlocked
    else for all Pa,Pb such that
        (i) Pk is locally dependent on Pa,
        (ii) Pa is waiting for 'Pb and
        (iii) Pa, Pb are on different controllers.
    send probe(i, a, b). to home site of Pb 
end

== Example ==
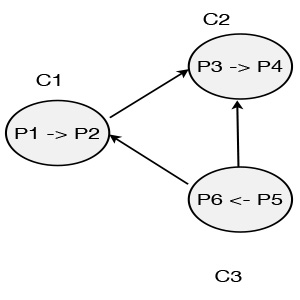
occurrence of deadlock in distributed system

P_{1} initiates deadlock detection. C_{1} sends the probe saying P_{2} depends on P_{3}. Once the message is received by C_{2}, it checks whether P_{3} is idle. P_{3} is idle because it is locally dependent on P_{4} and updates dependent_{3}(2) to True.

As above, C_{2} sends probe to C_{3} and C_{3} sends probe to C_{1}. At C_{1}, P_{1} is idle so it update dependent_{1}(1) to True. Therefore, deadlock can be declared.

== Complexity ==
Suppose there are $n$ controllers and $m$ processes, at most $m(n-1)/2$ messages need to be exchanged to detect a deadlock, with a delay of $O(n)$ messages.
