= K. Mani Chandy =

American computer scientist

Kanianthra Mani Chandy
- Born: 25 October 1944 (age 81); Kottayam, Travancore, British India (present-day Kerala, India)
- Education: Indian Institute of Technology, Madras (B.Tech., 1965); New York University Tandon School of Engineering (M.S., 1966); MIT (Ph.D., 1969)
- Known for: BCMP network Chandy–Herzog–Woo method
- Scientific career
- Workplaces: Caltech
- Thesis: Parametric Decomposition Programming (1969)
- Doctoral advisor: Jeremy Frank Shapiro
- Doctoral students: Laura M. Haas; Peter Hofstee; Eve Schooler; Don Towsley

Kanianthra Mani Chandy (born 25 October 1944) is the Simon Ramo Professor of Computer Science at the California Institute of Technology (Caltech). He has been the Executive Officer of the Computer Science Department twice, and he has been a professor at Caltech since 1989. He also served as Chair of the Division of Engineering and Applied Science at the California Institute of Technology.

== Early life and education ==
Chandy received his Ph.D. from the Massachusetts Institute of Technology in Electrical Engineering with a thesis in operations research. He also earned a Master's from the New York University, and a Bachelor's from the Indian Institute of Technology, Madras.

== Career ==
He has worked for Honeywell and IBM. From 1970 to 1989, he was in the Computer Science Department of the University of Texas at Austin, serving as chair in 1978–79 and 1983–85. He has served as a consultant to a number of companies including IBM and Bell Labs. He also served on the Engineering and Computer Science jury for the Infosys Prize in 2019.

== Research ==
In 1984, along with J Misra, Chandy proposed a new solution to the dining-philosophers problem.

Chandy does research in distributed computing. He has published three books and over a hundred papers on distributed computing, verification of concurrent programs, parallel programming languages and performance models of computing and communication systems, including the eponymous BCMP networks. He described the Chandy–Lamport algorithm together with Leslie Lamport.

== Recognition ==
He received the IEEE Koji Kobayashi Award for Computers and Communication in 1987, the A.A. Michelson Award from the Computer Measurement Group in 1985, and the IEEE Computer Society Charles Babbage Award in 1993.

Chandy was elected a member of the National Academy of Engineering in 1995 for contributions to computer performance modeling, parallel discrete-event simulation, and systematic development of concurrent programs.

He was elected as an ACM Fellow in 2019 "for contributions to queueing networks, performance analysis, distributed and parallel programming, and distributed simulation".

== See also ==
- Chandy–Misra–Haas algorithm resource model
