= Fernald Hall =

Coordinates: 42°23′18.89″N 72°31′20.61″W

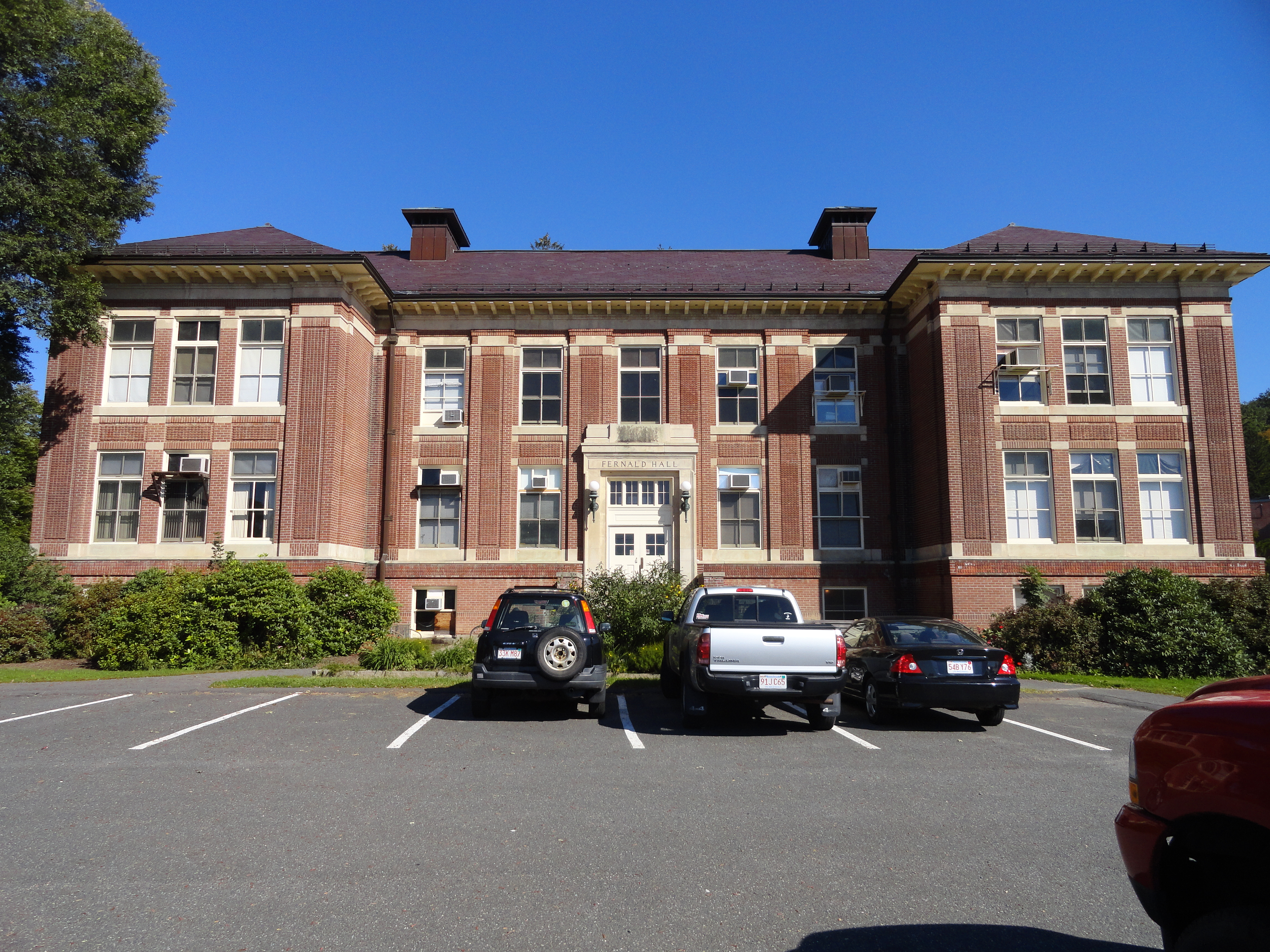
- Front entrance to Fernald Hall in 2011
- Interactive map of the Fernald Hall area

General information
- Type: Academic offices, classrooms, and research laboratories
- Architectural style: Classical revival
- Current tenants: Entomology; Plant Pathology
- Construction started: 1909
- Completed: 1911

Technical details
- Floor count: 4

Design and construction
- Architects: Clarence P. Hoyt, Boston
- Main contractor: Allen Brothers, Amherst

Fernald Hall is the primary lecture hall and laboratory used by the entomology program of the University of Massachusetts Amherst. The building also houses the university's extensive collection of domestic and foreign insects.

== History ==
In the early days of the Massachusetts Agricultural College, there were relatively few places to house the college's new aspiring science departments. Many of the earliest homes to the natural science programs and their collections were small wooden buildings that were notorious for catching fire. In the spring of 1907 it was decided that a natural sciences building should be conceived rather than an additional agricultural building as the trustees were concerned about safely storing the college's growing collections. In the fall of 1908, five architect's proposal's were presented to the president and department heads of the time, who decided on a design by Clarence P. Hoyt of Boston. In the following year, a total of $80,000 was appropriated for the construction of the new building.

Built in 1910 as this biological sciences building, Fernald Hall would become the permanent home for the Massachusetts Agricultural College's expanding entomology department. The hall was dedicated to longtime faculty member and economic entomologist Charles H. Fernald in March 1921, even though the college had a rule that no buildings were to be named for a person until after their death; on January 7, 1921, President Kenyon L. Butterfield and the trustees of the college waived that rule in order to tell Fernald, who was in very poor health at the time, about the future naming of the building. His son, Henry T. Fernald, also served as a professor and the department head between 1899 and 1930.

Within the year of the building's completion, the college constructed the apiary to serve as a laboratory where bees could be raised without causing the potential problem of stings and swarming. Over the years several other bug species would be raised in Fernald for class demonstrations and research purposes.

At some point since its construction the building underwent an expansion with the addition of a third floor, the installation of several new hallway skylights, and the expansion of its main lecture hall. These additions appear to have been sometime prior to a renovation in 1979.

== Layout ==
The first floor is the former home of the main office of TickReport as well as several faculty offices, and class laboratories. TickReport is now run privately under licensing agreement with the University of Massachusetts (www.Tickreport.com). The main lecture hall of the building has an entrance on this floor; the basement contains several research laboratories.

The second floor is home to the university's 100,000 insect reference collection, which contains many specimens from different parts of the world on display in its hallways. There are also several live specimen terrariums on display in these cases as well. Many of the faculty offices are on this floor as well as labs used for teaching the medical entomology and insect anatomy classes.

The third floor is currently sealed off from faculty and students due to building code violations. It contains several former graduate student offices, a photographic studio with a dark room and additional storage for the university's insect collections.

== See also ==
- Apiary Laboratory
- TickReport
