= University of Massachusetts Amherst College of Engineering =

School at the University of Massachusetts

Daniel J. Riccio Jr. College of Engineering
- Public constituent college
- University of Massachusetts Amherst
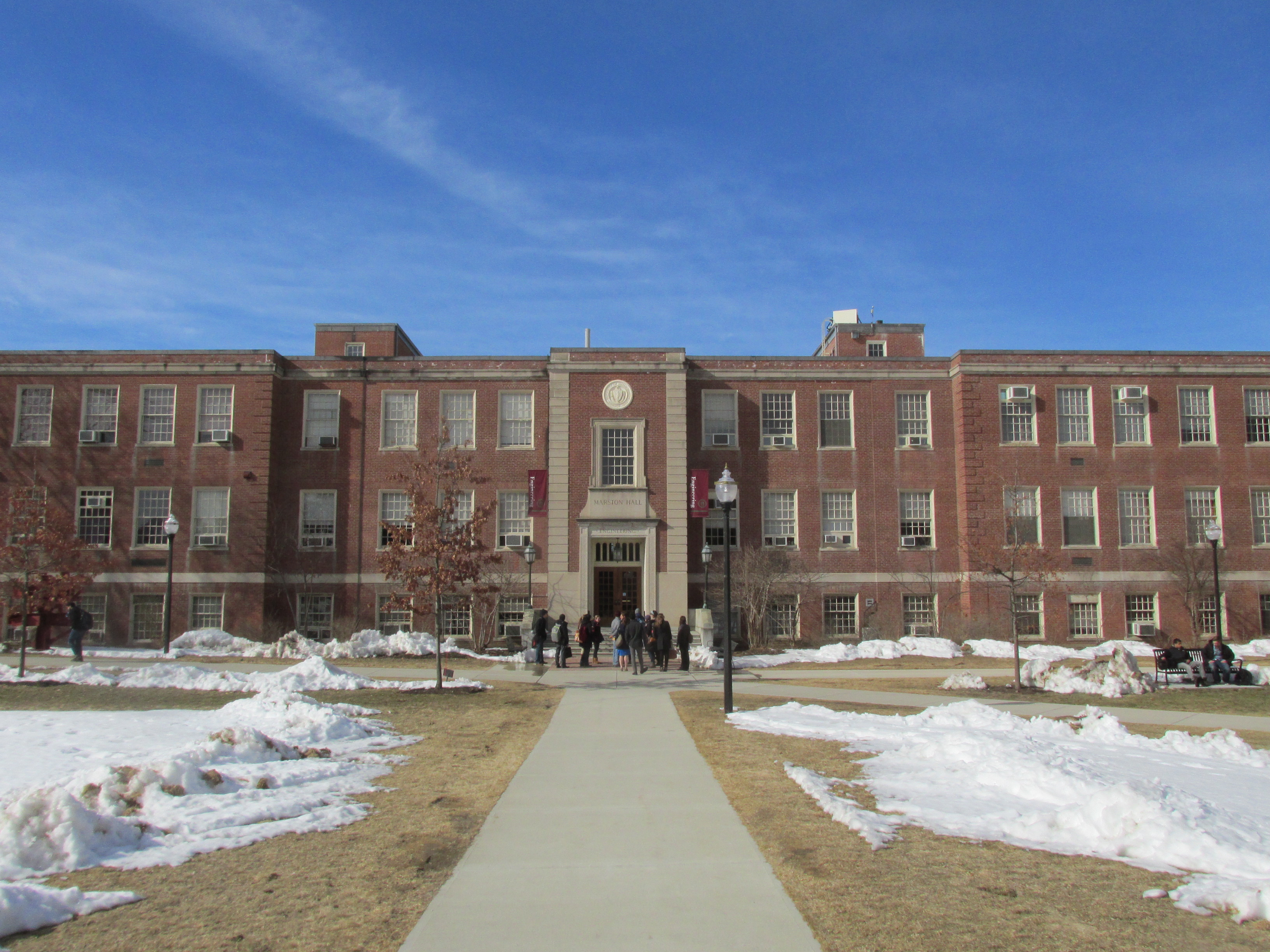
- Marston Hall

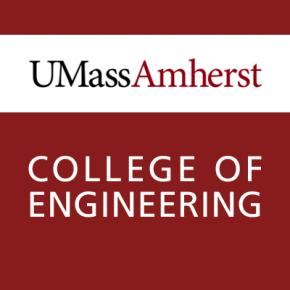
- Logo
- Location: Amherst, Massachusetts
- Campus quad: Engineering Quad
- Coordinates: 42°23′36.9″N 72°31′45.7″W
- Full name: University of Massachusetts Amherst Daniel J. Riccio Jr. College of Engineering
- Established: 1914 (as department); 1947 (as college)
- Colors
- Gender: Co-educational
- Dean: Sanjay Raman
- Membership: 2860
- Undergraduates: 2250
- Postgraduates: 610
- Endowment: $24.2M (2020)
- Website: www.engineering.umass.edu

The Daniel J. Riccio Jr. College of Engineering is one of the schools and colleges at the University of Massachusetts Amherst. It was established on September 1, 1947 as the School of Engineering and now considered as the best public engineering school in New England, enrolling 2250 undergraduate students and 610 graduate students including 300 M.S. students and 310 Ph.D. students for the 2018–2019 school year. The College of Engineering at UMass Amherst has eight buildings, including the Elab II, research facilities, computer labs, and graduate offices. It has more than 16,000 living alumni around the world.

== Departments ==
The College of Engineering at University of Massachusetts Amherst contains five departments:

- Biomedical Engineering
- Chemical Engineering
- Civil and Environmental Engineering
- Electrical and Computer Engineering
- Mechanical and Industrial Engineering

== Academics ==
The College of Engineering at the University of Massachusetts Amherst offers seven Bachelor of Science (B.S.) degrees. These programs are accredited by the Engineering Accreditation Commission of ABET:

=== Undergraduate programs ===
==== Bachelor of Science (B.S.) degrees ====
- Biomedical Engineering
- Chemical Engineering
- Civil Engineering
- Computer Engineering
- Electrical Engineering
- Industrial Engineering
- Mechanical Engineering

=== Graduate programs ===
==== Master of Science (M.S.) degrees ====
- Chemical Engineering
- Civil Engineering
- Environmental Engineering
- Electrical and Computer Engineering
- Industrial Engineering
- Mechanical Engineering
- Agricultural Engineering

=== Doctoral programs ===
==== Doctor of Philosophy (PhD) degrees ====
- Chemical Engineering
- Civil Engineering
- Electrical and Computer Engineering
- Industrial Engineering
- Mechanical Engineering

== Research Centers ==
The College of Engineering at the University of Massachusetts Amherst host number of research centers including;

- Center for Biological Physics
- Center for e-Design
- Center for Energy Efficiency and Renewable Energy
- Center for Hierarchical Manufacturing
- Cybersecurity Institute
- Center for Collaborative Adaptive Sensing of the Atmosphere
- Institute for Applied Life Sciences
  - Center for Bioactive Delivery
  - Center for Personalized Health Monitoring
  - Models to Medicine Center
- MassNanoTech Institute
- Materials Research Science and Engineering Center
- Northeast Climate Adaption Science Center
- The Institute for Massachusetts Biofuels Research (TIMBR)
- UMass Transportation Center
- Water Resources Research Center
- Wind Energy Center
- WINSSS: National Center for Innovative Small Drinking Water Systems

== Engineering Design Teams ==
The College of Engineering hosts several engineering design teams led by students.

- Minutmen Racing - Formula SAE
- UMass Robotics
- Aeronautics Team
- ChemE Car
- Concrete Canoe
- Engineers Without Borders
- HackUMass
- UMass iGEM
- UMass MedTech Team
- UMass Rocket Team
- Seismic Design Team
- Steel Bridge Team
- UMass Supermileage Vehicle Team

== Notable alumni ==
- Daniel Riccio, Former VP of Apple Inc.
- Steve Sanghi, President and CEO of Microchip Technology
- Gil Penchina, Former CEO of Wikia Inc.
- Devang Khakhar, Former director of the Indian Institute of Technology Bombay
- Matthew Tirrell, Distinguished Service Professor Emeritus at Pritzker School of Molecular Engineering, University of Chicago

== See also ==
- List of research centers at the University of Massachusetts Amherst
