= Pablo Visconti =

Argentine biologist

Pablo E. Visconti is an Argentine professor of reproductive biology at the University of Massachusetts Amherst, whose papers on reproduction were recognized as Papers of the Week by both the Journal of Biological Chemistry and Proceedings of the National Academy of Sciences in October 2013.

== Career ==
In 2010, Visconti, Julian Sosnik, and Mariano G. Buffone studied CD9, CAPZA3, and IZUMO1 proteins. During their studies they discovered that CAPZA3 protein was similar to IZUMO1 and is considered to be an inhibitor of latrunculin. In 2011 he and his colleagues presented strong evidence of transmembrane adenyl cyclase being present in Rhinella arenarum. In 1999, Visconti and his colleagues studied sodium bicarbonate and suggested that cyclic adenosine monophosphate in combination with tyrosine phosphorylation could change hamster sperm. In 2013 he and his colleagues from the Rosario National University and the National Autonomous University of Mexico studied in vitro fertilization and suggested that pathways in head and tail have different proteins.
