= Jane Fountain =

American political scientist

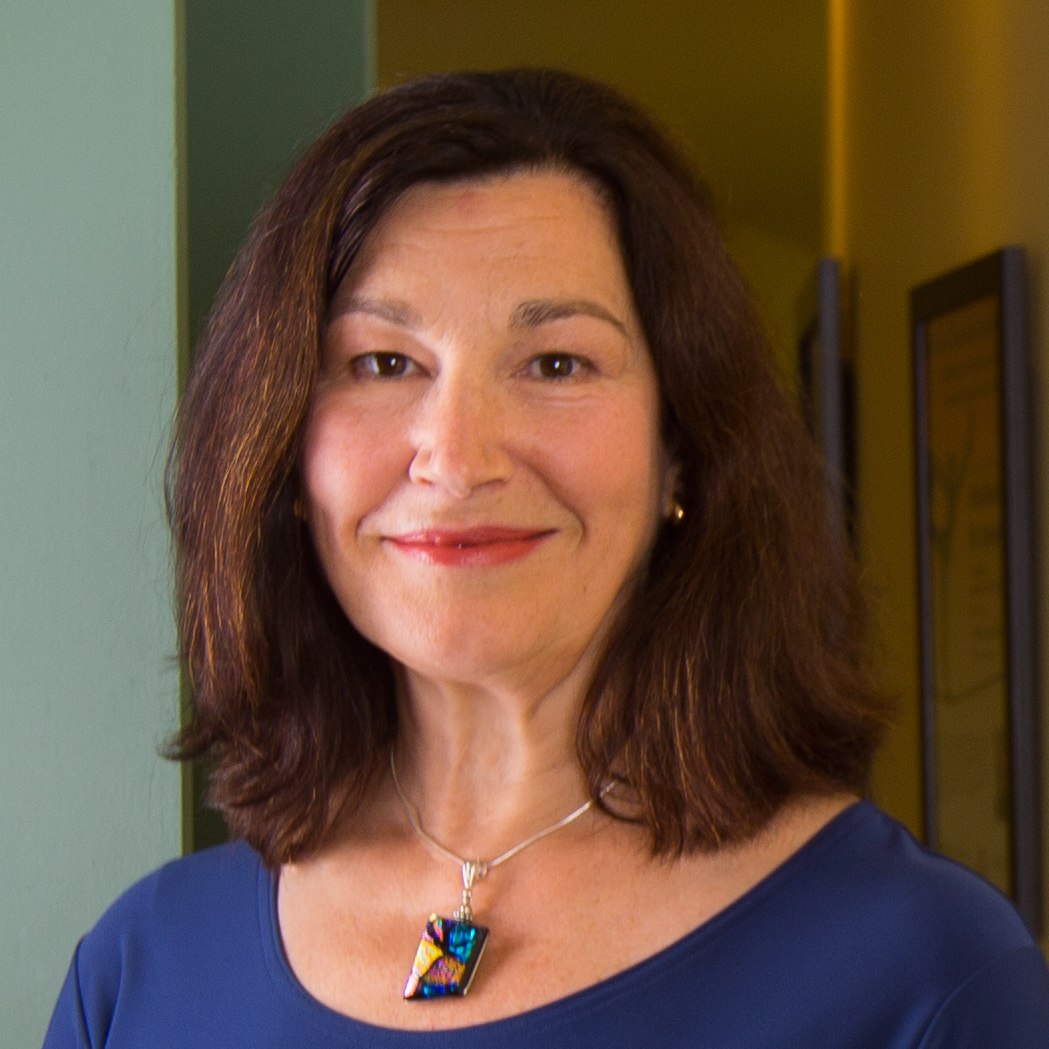
- Official portrait of Jane Fountain 2014
- Born: Medford, Massachusetts
- Education: Boston Conservatory of Music (Bachelor of Music); Harvard University (Ed.M.); Yale University (Ph.D.)
- Known for: Building the Virtual State, the National Center for Digital Government
- Scientific career
- Fields: Political Science, Technology, Government, Public Management
- Workplaces: University of Massachusetts Amherst

Jane E. Fountain is an American political scientist and technology theorist. She is Distinguished University Professor of political science and public policy, the founder and director of the National Center for Digital Government at the University of Massachusetts Amherst, and formerly faculty at the John F. Kennedy School of Government at Harvard University. She is known for her work on institutional change and on the use of technology in governance.

== Career ==
Fountain earned a bachelor's degree in music from the Boston Conservatory of Music in 1977, serving as concertmaster from 1975 to 1977. She then earned a master's degree in education (administration, planning and social policy) from Harvard University in 1982, and several degrees from Yale University, culminating in a Ph.D. in political science and organizational behavior in 1990. She began teaching at the John F. Kennedy School of Government at Harvard in 1989. In 1998 she established the Women in the Information Age Project and in 2001, with support from the National Science Foundation, established the National Center for Digital Government with David Lazer. In 2005 Fountain moved to the University of Massachusetts Amherst and NCDG was re-established there. Fountain also directs the Science, Technology and Society Initiative at the University of Massachusetts Amherst.

Fountain has worked with numerous governmental and NGO organizations. She has been involved with the World Economic Forum for a number of years, serving on the Global Agenda Council on the Future of Government and as Council Chair and Vice Chair. In 2012 she was appointed to the Massachusetts-based Governor's Council on Innovation. She has also worked with the World Bank, the European Commission, the National Science Foundation, and numerous national governments.

In 2001, Fountain published Building the Virtual State: Information Technology and Institutional Change, which has been published in multiple languages, and is regarded as a key text in digital government scholarship.

== Selected works ==
- Building the Virtual State: Information Technology and Institutional Change (2001) (awarded "Outstanding Academic Title" by Choice)
- "Social Capital: A Key Enabler of Innovation" Investing in Innovation: Toward A Consensus Strategy for Federal Technology Policy. Ed. Lewis Branscomb and James Keller. Cambridge, MA: MIT Press, 1998.
- "Paradoxes of Public Sector Customer Service", Governance, v.14, n.1, pp. 55–73 (Jan. 2001)
- "Constructing the Information Society: Women, Information Technology and Design." Technology in Society 22: 45-62. 2000.

== Awards and honors ==
- 2014 - Federal 100 Award, Federal Computer Week.
- 2013 - Distinguished University Professor, University of Massachusetts Amherst.
- 2012 - Elected Fellow of the National Academy of Public Administration.
- 2012 - Chancellor's Medal for Academic Excellence and Extraordinary Service to the Campus, University of Massachusetts Amherst.
- 2011 - Inaugural ITP Section Senior Fellow, Information Technology and Politics Section, American Political Science Association.
- 2010 - Chancellor's Award for Outstanding Accomplishments in Research and Creative Activity, University of Massachusetts Amherst.
- 2000 - Fellow, Radcliffe Institute for Advanced Study.
