= Laura M. Haas =

American computer scientist

Laura Myers Haas
- Education: University of Texas at Austin (Ph.D, 1981); Harvard University (B.S., Computer Science, 1978)
- Known for: Database systems and Information integration
- Awards: E. F. Codd Award (2015); ACM Fellow (2006); National Academy of Engineering (2010); IBM Fellow (2009)
- Scientific career
- Fields: Computer science
- Workplaces: University of Massachusetts Amherst; IBM Research, Almaden Laboratory (1981-2017)
- Doctoral advisor: K. Mani Chandy and Jayadev Misra

Laura M. Haas is an American computer scientist noted for her research in database systems and information integration. She is best known for creating systems and tools for the integration of heterogeneous data from diverse sources, including federated technology that virtualizes access to data, and mapping technology that enables non-programmers to specify how data should be integrated.

She led the Starburst project on extensible database systems, showing how diverse information could be integrated into a relational database. Her research was the foundation for IBM's DB2 LUW query processor. She was the overall architect for Garlic, a novel data federation system that provides integrated access to many data sources from a high-level nonprocedural language, and personally invented and implemented query optimization techniques that allowed Garlic to process queries efficiently, exploiting the capabilities of the underlying data sources. Haas led the development of IBM InfoSphere Federation Server based on this technology, and was the technical lead of the IBM team which helped establish the enterprise information integration market. She also led the Clio project, inventing the concept and basic algorithms for schema mapping, and embodying them in the first tool to compute necessary transformations to bring data from diverse sources into a common format automatically. She provided thought leadership and pursued research around information integration, most recently in the context of big data, as the director of IBM Research's Accelerated Discovery Lab.

== Biography ==
Haas received an A.B. in applied mathematics and computer science from Harvard University in 1978. She received a Ph.D in computer science from the University of Texas at Austin in 1981. In 1981, Haas began as a research staff member at IBM Almaden Research Center, and has spent her career at IBM Research (with a one-year visiting fellow position at University of Wisconsin in 1992–1993). She has held numerous positions within IBM Research, including as IBM Fellow and director of IBM Research Accelerated Discovery Lab. She was appointed dean of the College of Information and Computer Sciences at the University of Massachusetts Amherst in August 2017.

She is married to Peter J. Haas, also a longtime IBM Research member who moved with her to Amherst.

== Awards ==
In 2006, Haas was named an ACM Fellow "for research leadership, and contributions to federated database systems".

In 2010, she was elected to the National Academy of Engineering "for innovations in the design and implementation of systems for information integration".

In 2010, Haas received the ABIE Technical Leadership Award at the Grace Hopper Celebration of Women in Computing.

In 2015, she won the SIGMOD Edgar F. Codd Innovations Award.

== See also ==
- Chandy–Misra–Haas algorithm resource model
