= Sanjay Raman =

American electrical engineer

Academic background
- Education: Georgia Tech (BEE); University of Michigan (MS) (PhD)

Academic work
- Discipline: Electrical Engineering
- Institutions: Virginia Tech; UMass Amherst

Sanjay Raman is an American electrical engineer. He is the dean of the College of Engineering at the University of Massachusetts Amherst. He was previously a professor of electrical and computer engineering at Virginia Tech, where he was also associate vice president of Virginia Tech in the National Capital Region.

From 2007-2013, Raman was a program manager in the Microsystems Technology Office of the Defense Advanced Research Projects Agency (DARPA). For his service in the DARPA, he was awarded the Secretary of Defense Medal for Exceptional Public Service in 2013.

He was awarded the Presidential Early Career Award for Scientists and Engineers in 1999, for his research into the application of mixed-signal integrated circuits to wireless communications and for his work on microwave engineering. He was also named a Fellow of the Institute of Electrical and Electronics Engineers (IEEE) in 2013 for his work on adaptive microwave and millimeter-wave integrated circuits.

Raman earned his B.S. in electrical engineering from Georgia Tech in 1987. He subsequently served as nuclear-trained submarine officer in the U.S. Navy from 1987 to 1992. He earned his Ph.D in electrical engineering from the University of Michigan in 1998.
