= Anna Maria Siega-Riz =

American nutrition and child health academic

Anna Maria Siega-Riz is an American nutrition, maternal and child health scientist and academic administrator. She is dean of the University of Massachusetts Amherst School of Public Health and Health Sciences. Siega-Riz was previously associate dean for research and the Jeanette Lancaster Alumni Professor of Nursing at University of Virginia School of Nursing.

== Education ==
Anna Maria Siega-Riz completed a Bachelors of Science in Public Health with a major in nutrition at UNC Gillings School of Global Public Health in 1982. She earned a Master of Science in Food, Nutrition, and Food Service Management from University of North Carolina at Greensboro in 1983. She obtained a Doctor of Philosophy in nutrition with a minor in epidemiology from Gillings School of Global Public Health in 1993. From 1994 to 1995, Siega-Riz completed postdoctoral research at the Carolina Population Center.

== Career ==
Siega-Riz joined the faculty at the UNC Gillings School of Global Public Health as a research assistant professor in 1995. She became the associate dean for academic affairs and led the Reproductive, Perinatal, and Pediatric Program in the Department of Epidemiology. Siega-Riz is the associate dean for research and the Jeanette Lancaster Alumni Professor of Nursing at University of Virginia School of Nursing.

She served on the Dietary Guidelines Federal Advisory Committee from 2013 to 2015. She also served on the advisory council of the National Heart, Lung, and Blood Institute.

She was a registered dietitian from 1983 to 2014. She speaks English and Spanish.

In 2019, she became a dean of the University of Massachusetts Amherst School of Public Health and Health Sciences.
