= Peter J. Haas (computer scientist) =

American computer scientist and operations researcher

Peter J. Haas is an American computer scientist and operations researcher known for his work in information management and big data. He worked for 30 years at IBM Research before becoming a professor of computer science at the University of Massachusetts Amherst.

== Education and career ==
Haas graduated in 1978 from Harvard University, magna cum laude, with a degree in engineering and applied sciences. He earned a master's degree in environmental engineering in 1979 from Stanford University, and a second master's degree in statistics in 1984 from Stanford. He completed his Ph.D. in operations research in 1986 at Stanford.

He was a scientist for Radian Corporation from 1979 to 1981, and an assistant professor of decision and information sciences at Santa Clara University from 1985 to 1987, before joining IBM Research in 1987. While at IBM, he also held adjunct and lecturer positions at Stanford.

He moved to the University of Massachusetts Amherst in 2017, following his wife, Laura M. Haas, who moved to the same university to become dean of information and computer sciences.

== Service ==
Haas was president of the Institute for Operations Research and the Management Sciences (INFORMS) Simulation Society for 2010–2012.

== Books ==
Haas is the author or co-author of books including:

- Stochastic Petri Nets: Modelling, Stability, Simulation (Springer, 2002)
- Synopses for Massive Data: Samples, Histograms, Wavelets, Sketches (with G. Cormode, M. Garofalakis, and C. Jermaine, Foundations and Trends in Databases, NOW Publishers, 2011)

== Recognition ==
Haas is a Fellow of the Association for Computing Machinery (2013) and was named a fellow of INFORMS in 2016 "for sustained and fundamental contributions to discrete-event simulation and interactive sampling-based analytics for massive data sets as well as for significant service to the simulation community". He has won many other awards for his research publications.
