= Walter B. Denny =

American art historian

- Born: Walter Bell Denny; United States
- Occupations: Art historian Educator
- Spouse: Alice Robbins
- Children: 1 (Matthew)

Academic background
- Education: Oberlin College; Harvard University
- Thesis: The Ceramics of the Mosque of Rüstem Pasha and the Environment of Change (1971)

Academic work
- Discipline: Art history
- Sub-discipline: Islamic art
- Institutions: University of Massachusetts Amherst
- Website: wbdenny.com

Walter Bell Denny is an American art historian and educator. A scholar of Islamic art, Denny is a University Distinguished Professor of Art History at the University of Massachusetts Amherst.

== Career ==
Denny graduated cum laude from Oberlin College with a B.A. in 1964. He received a Ph.D. in Art History from Harvard in 1971. His revised doctoral dissertation was published as The ceramics of the Mosque of Rüstem Pasha and the environment of change in 1977.

Denny has taught at the University of Massachusetts Amherst since 1970, and was named University Distinguished Professor of Art History in 2014. Throughout his career, Denny has been a scholar of Islamic art, studying such subjects as the Rüstem Pasha Mosque and the Saz style. He became emeritus in 2023.

He has been affiliated with many organizations: trustee of the Textile Museum at George Washington University; honorary curator at the Harvard Art Museums, senior scholar and member of visiting committee at the Metropolitan Museum of Art, governor of the Institute of Turkish Studies, and consults for many other institutions.

== Books ==
- The ceramics of the Mosque of Rüstem Pasha and the environment of change, 1977.
- Gardens of Paradise: Ottoman Turkish Tiles of the 15th-17th Centuries, Istanbul, 1998.
- Masterpieces of Anatolian Carpets from the Museum of Turkish and Islamic Arts, Istanbul, Bern, Ertuğ & Kocabiyik, 2001.
- The Classical Tradition in Anatolian Carpets, Washington D.C.: The Textile Museum, 2002.
- Ipek: Imperial Ottoman Silks and Velvets, London: Azimuth Editions, 2002.
- Iznik: La céramique turque et l'art ottoman, Paris: Editions Citadelles et Mazenod, 2004. English edition, 2005; German edition, 2005.
- The Sultan's Garden, with Sumru Belger Krody., Washington: The Textile Museum, 2012.
- How to Read Islamic Carpets, Yale University Press, 2014.

== See also ==
- List of Harvard University people
- List of Oberlin College alumni
- List of University of Massachusetts Amherst faculty
