= Engineering Research Center for Collaborative Adaptive Sensing of the Atmosphere =

- Abbreviation: CASA
- Established: 2003 (23 years ago)
- Types: research institute
- Aim: radar meteorology
- Headquarters: University of Massachusetts Amherst
- Country: United States
- Affiliations: National Science Foundation
- Website: www.casa.umass.edu/index.php

The Engineering Research Center for Collaborative Adaptive Sensing of the Atmosphere (CASA) is a National Science Foundation Engineering Center. The Center brings together a multidisciplinary group of engineers, computer scientists, meteorologists, sociologists, graduate and undergraduate students, as well as industry and government partners to conduct fundamental research, develop enabling technology, and deploy prototype engineering systems based on a new paradigm: Distributed Collaborative Adaptive Sensing (DCAS) networks.

== History ==
CASA was established in 2003 under the National Science Foundation. Beginning in FY 2010, the main source of funding and support came from the Jerome M. Paros Fund for Measurement and Environmental Sciences Research.

== Structure ==
CASA is a collaboration among four academic partners: the University of Massachusetts Amherst (lead institution), the University of Oklahoma, Colorado State University, and the University of Puerto Rico. Other collaborating academic institutions are: the University of Delaware, the University of Virginia and McGill University.

== Achievements ==
CASA initially operated a network of low-power, short-range, X- band, dual-polarized Doppler weather radars in southwestern Oklahoma. The system, known as Integrative Project 1 or IP1 for short, was installed in January 2006 and began operation April 1 of 2006. IP1 is the first CASA test bed to demonstrate DCAS and the value of low-level sensing, and a number of research opportunities will be made available by the system. Since the construction of IP1, two new testbeds have been built and tested - one in Dallas, and one in Massachusetts.
