= Morrill Science Center =

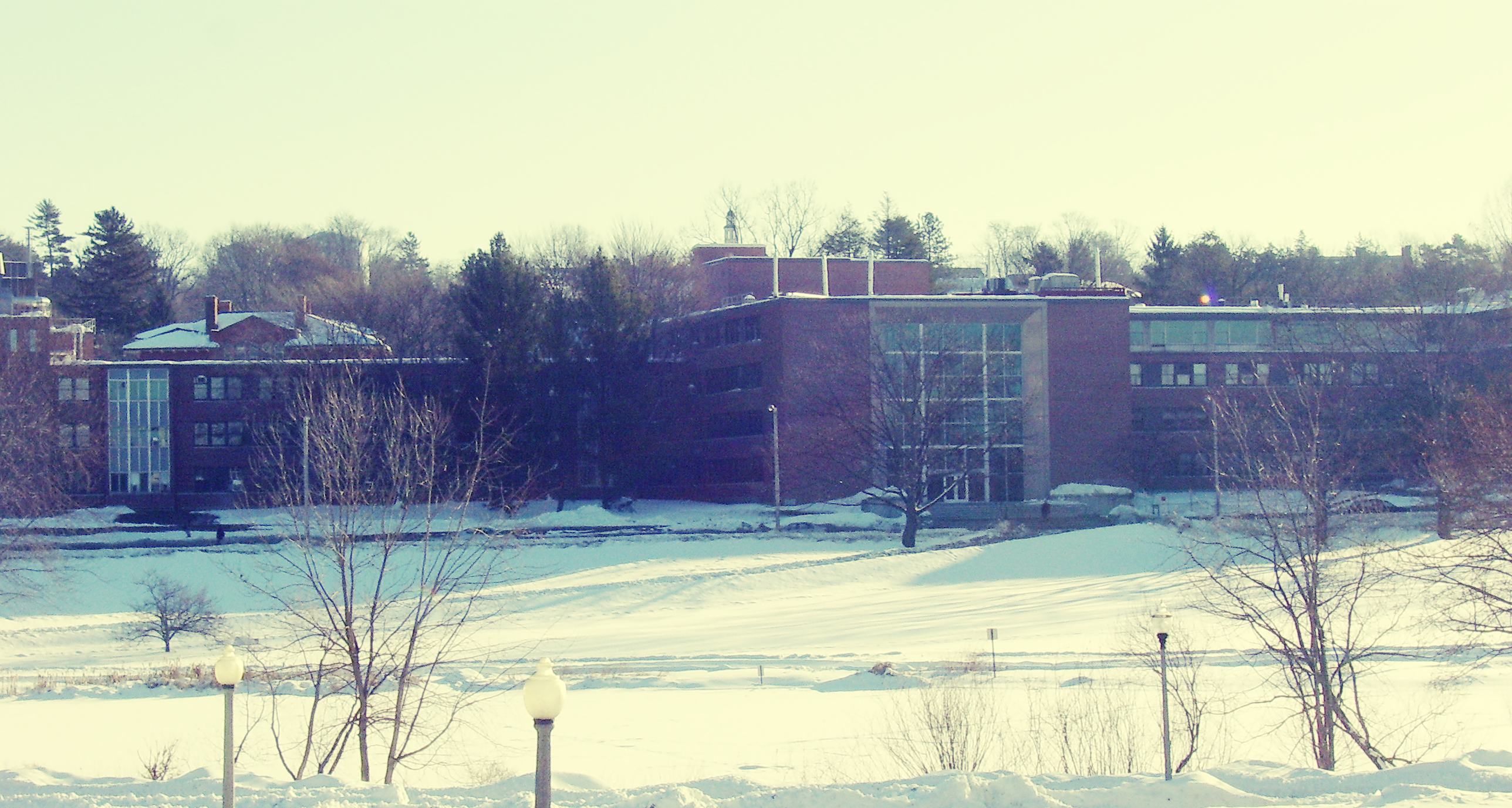
- Morrill Science Center
- Interactive map of the Morrill Science Center area

General information
- Type: Academic offices, classrooms, collections and research laboratories
- Coordinates: 42°23′24.71″N 72°31′28.36″W
- Current tenants: Associate Deans' Offices; College of Natural Sciences; Dept. of Biology; Dept. of Biochemistry; Dept. of Geosciences; Dept. of Public Health; Dept. of Vet. & Animal Sciences
- Completed: Morrill 1- 1959; Morrill 2- 1960; Morrill 3- 1963; Morrill 4- 1966

Technical details
- Floor count: 4

The Justin S. Morrill Science Center, more commonly known as the Morrill Science Center is a research center, lecture hall, and faculty office complex serving the College of Natural Sciences at the University of Massachusetts Amherst. It comprises four buildings that contain research laboratories for several different programs, including the biochemistry, biology, geosciences, microbiology, and public health departments.

== Naming ==
The Morrill Science Center is named for Justin S. Morrill of the Morrill Land-Grant Colleges Act, the statute which founded the original Massachusetts Agricultural College. A recurring joke among faculty and students is the odd numbering of the 4 buildings in this complex. There are several directory maps posted throughout the hallways of the buildings headed as "Morrill Made Easy" with a line below each map saying "Don't Panic. It's not supposed to make sense."
