= MassCREST =

MassCREST stands for Massachusetts Center for Renewable Energy Science and Technology at the University of Massachusetts Amherst. It brings together complementary expertise in molecular design and synthesis, physical characterizations, device fabrications and theoretical modeling from at least five different departments within UMass Amherst.

Using their expertise in soft materials and in soft-hard material interfaces, MassCREST researchers are focusing on developing efficient solar cells and fuel cells, producing hydrogen from water using enzymes and developing catalysts for the conversion of biomass to hydrocarbon fuels.
