= Marston Hall =

Coordinates: 42.3940°N 72.5293°W

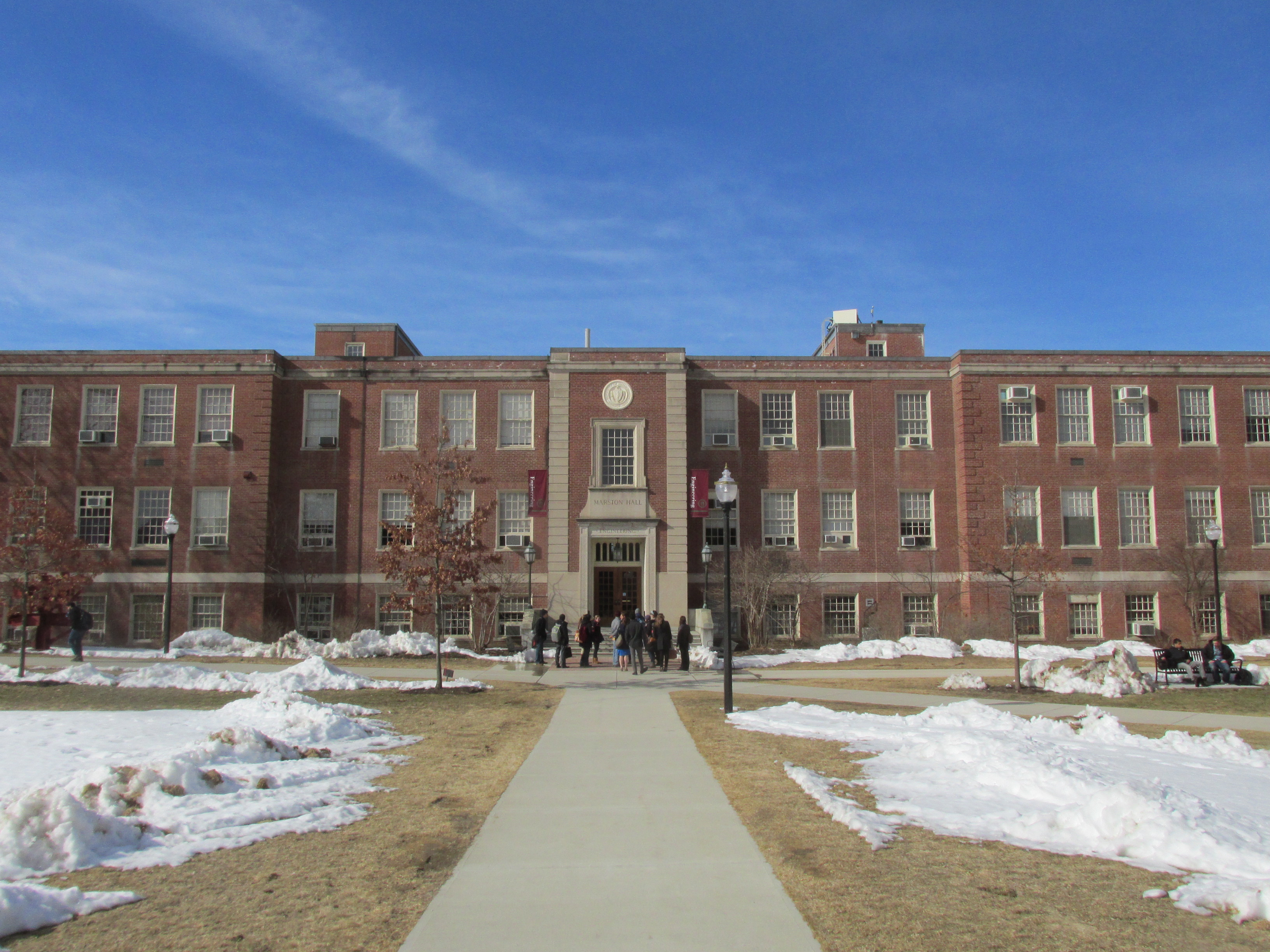
Marston Hall in 2014

Marston Hall is an academic building on the campus of the University of Massachusetts Amherst. It houses the Dean of Engineering and parts of the Departments of Civil and Environmental Engineering, Mechanical and Industrial Engineering, and Electrical and Computer Engineering.
