= National Center for Digital Government =

National Center for Digital Government is a research center at the University of Massachusetts Amherst. The center is directed by Jane Fountain, professor of political science and public policy. Charles Schweik, associate professor of natural resources conservation and public policy, is the associate director of NCDG. The center, established with support from the National Science Foundation, focuses on the interface between technology, government and institutions.

Prior to 2005, the center was based at Harvard Kennedy School at Harvard University, where Fountain was an associate professor. The successor program to the National Center for Digital Government at Harvard, the Program on Networked Governance, was launched at Harvard Kennedy School following the National Center's departure. The Program on Networked Governance is directed by David Lazer and is also supported by the National Science Foundation.

== See also ==
- digital government
- e-government
- Open-source software
- information technology
