= Iannarelli =

Iannarelli is an Italian surname. Notable people with the surname include:

- Janine K. Iannarelli (born 1961), American businesswoman
- Simone Iannarelli (born 1970), Italian composer and classical guitarist
