= Jonathan Koppell =

American academic

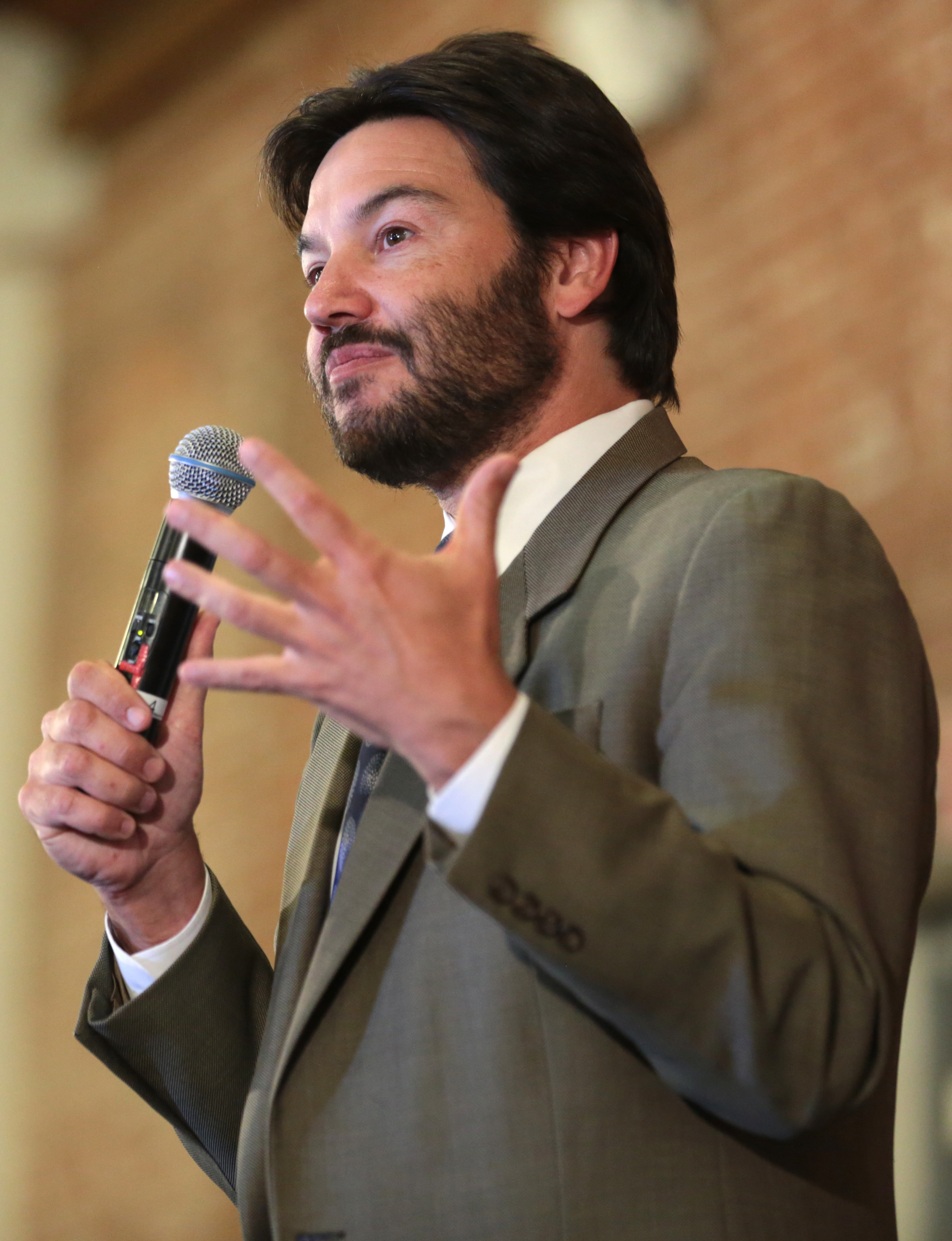
- Koppell in April 2017

9th President of Montclair State University
- Incumbent
- Assumed office August 2, 2021
- Preceded by: Susan A. Cole

Vice-Provost for Public Service and Social Impact, Arizona State University
- In office 2020–2021

Personal details
- Education: Harvard University University of California, Berkeley

Jonathan Koppell is the President of Montclair State University, Montclair New Jersey. He previously served as dean of the Watts College of Public Service & Community Solutions and Provost for Public Service and Social Impact at Arizona State University.

== Education ==
Koppell holds a bachelor's degree from Harvard University and both a doctorate and master's degree from the University of California, Berkeley. His career in public service began as a Research Assistant with the Office of Federal Housing Enterprise Oversight in Washington, D.C. from 1993-1995. In 1999, Koppell served as a Guest Scholar at the Brookings Institution while simultaneously holding the title of Markle Fellow of the New America Foundation.

== Career ==
In 2003, Koppell served as Fulbright Lecturer and Professor of Public Administration and Public Policy at Fudan University in Shanghai, China. In 2006, Koppell was named an associate professor at Yale University of Political Science and the Director of the university’s Millstein Center for Corporate Governance and Performance. Koppell became Chairman of the City of New Haven, Connecticut Development Commission in 2008. In 2012 the National Academy of Public Administration chose Koppell as one of its nearly 800 Fellows.

Koppell joined Arizona State University in 2010 as Director of the School of Public Affairs. In 2011, he became Dean of the Watts College of Public Service & Community Solutions, succeeding Debra Friedman. In 2015, Koppell launched the Public Service Academy at ASU, a four-year program of classes, hands-on experiences and internships to create working relationships between civilians and military personnel and collaborations among the public, private and non-profit sectors. In 2018, his college gained the prefix "Watts" after a $30 million dollar donation from Mike and Cindy Watts.

In 2021, Koppell became President of Montclair State University, succeeding President Susan A. Cole.

== Academic work ==
Koppell has conducted research related to the structure and administration of complex organizations, corporate governance, financial regulation, and government involvement in for-profit enterprise.

He is the author of two books:

- World Rule: Legitimacy, Accountability and the Design of Global Governance (2010) ISBN 0226450996
- The Politics of Quasi-Government: Hybrid Organizations and the Dynamics of Bureaucratic Control (2003) ISBN 0521525608
