= Herman Sokol =

American chemist (1916–1985)

- Born: November 14, 1916
- Died: June 22, 1985 (aged 68); Memorial Sloan-Kettering Cancer Center; Manhattan, New York
- Known for: Tetracycline
- Title: President of Bristol-Myers Company
- Term: 1976-1981

Herman Sokol (October 14, 1916 – June 22, 1985) was an American chemist who was a co-discoverer of tetracycline. He was president of Bristol-Myers Company from 1976 to 1981.

He died on June 22, 1985, at the Memorial Sloan-Kettering Cancer Center in Manhattan, New York.

== Legacy ==
Montclair State University established Margaret and Herman Sokol Institute for Pharmaceutical Life Sciences.
