= Susan Cole (academic administrator) =

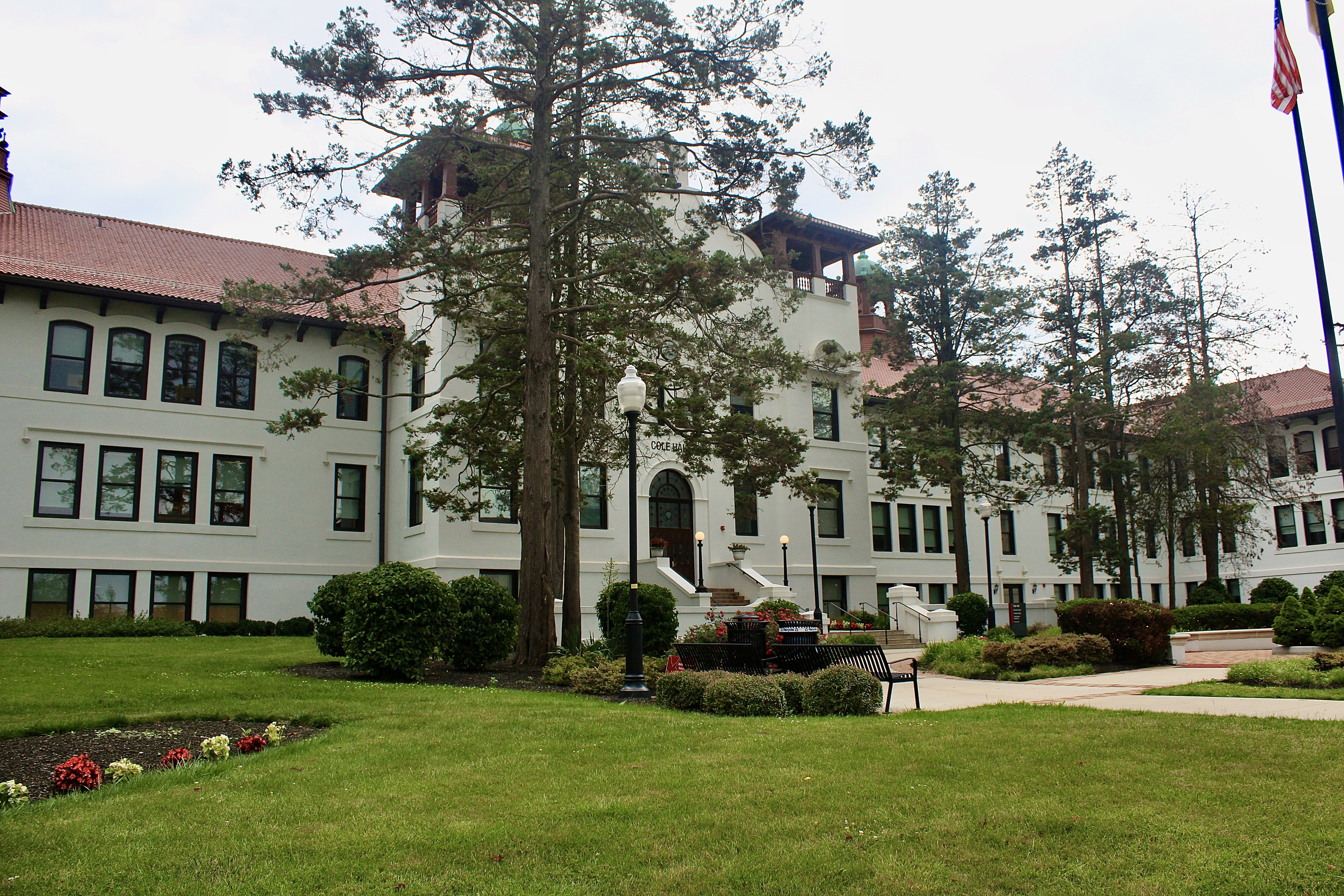
Susan Cole Hall

Susan Cole served as the eighth president of Montclair State University from September 1998 until her retirement in July, 2021. Previously, Dr. Cole served as president of Metropolitan State University in Minneapolis-Saint Paul, Minnesota from 1993 to 1998. From 1980 to 1991, she served as vice president for university administration and personnel at Rutgers University. She has also served as associate university dean for academic affairs at Antioch University and been a visiting senior fellow in academic administration at the City University of New York.

== Education ==
Cole earned the following degrees in English and American literature: a B.A. from Barnard College, and an M.A. and Ph.D. from Brandeis University.
