= Montclair State University =

Public university in Montclair, New Jersey, US

- Former name: List: New Jersey State Normal School at Montclair (1908–1927); Montclair State Teachers College (1927–1958); Newark Normal School of Physical Education and Hygiene (1917–1928); Panzer College of Physical Education and Hygiene (1928–1958); Montclair State College (1958–1994)
- Motto: Carpe Diem (Latin)
- Motto in English: "Seize the Day"
- Type: Public research university
- Established: September 28, 1908; 118 years ago
- Accreditation: MSCHE
- Academic affiliations: Sea-grant; space-grant
- Endowment: $157.85 million (2025)
- President: Jonathan Koppell
- Total staff: 3,662
- Students: 22,570
- Undergraduates: 18,062
- Postgraduates: 4,508
- Location: Montclair-Little Falls, New Jersey, United States; 40°51′32.78″N 74°11′55.27″W
- Campus: 486 acres (1.97 km^{2}); Large Suburb
- Newspaper: The Montclarion
- Colors: Red and white
- Nickname: Red Hawks
- Sporting affiliations: NCAA Division III – NJAC
- Mascots: Rocky the Red Hawk (formerly, the Indians)
- Website: montclair.edu

Montclair State University (Montclair) is a public research university in Montclair, New Jersey, United States. Parts of the campus extend into Clifton and into Little Falls. As of June 2024, there were 22,570 total enrolled students: 18,062 undergraduate students and 4,508 graduate students. It is classified among "R2: Doctoral Universities – High research activity". The campus covers approximately 252 acres (1.02 km^{2}). The university offers more than 300 majors, minors, and concentrations.

== History ==
Plans for the State Normal school were initiated in 1903, and required a year for the State of New Jersey to grant permission to build the school. It was then established as "New Jersey State Normal School at Montclair", a normal school, in 1908 approximately five years after the initial planning of the school. At the time, Governor John Franklin Fort attended the dedication of the school in 1908, and the school was to have its first principal Charles Sumner Chapin that same year. The first building constructed was College Hall (now known as Cole Hall), and it still stands today. At the time, the campus was around 25 acres (100,000 m^{2}), had 8 faculty members and 187 students. The first graduating class, which numbered at 45 students, contained William O. Trapp, who would then go on to win the Pulitzer Prize for journalism in 1929. The first dormitory was then built five years later, in 1915, and is known as Russ Hall.

In 1927, Harry Sprague was the first president of Montclair, and shortly afterwards the school began being more inclusive of extracurricular activities such as athletics. In 1927, however, after studies had emerged concerning the number of high school teachers in the state of New Jersey (only 10% of all high school teachers received their degrees from New Jersey), the institution became "Montclair State Teachers College" and developed a four-year (Bachelor of Arts) program in pedagogy, becoming the first US institute to do so. In 1937 it became the first teachers college accredited by the Middle States Association of Colleges and Schools.

In 1943, during World War II, several students, with permission from the president, Harry Sprague, joined the US Navy as volunteers to train for the war. It was also a time when students and faculty sold war bonds to support US American troops.

In 1958 the school merged with the "Panzer College of Physical Education and Hygiene" to become "Montclair State College". The school became a comprehensive multi-purpose institution in 1966. The Board of Higher Education designated the school a teaching university on April 27, 1994, and in the same year the school became "Montclair State University". It has offered Master of Arts programs since 1932, Master of Business Administration since 1981, Master of Education since 1985, Master of Science since 1992, Master of Fine Arts since 1998, Doctor of Education since 1999, and Doctor of Environmental Management in 2003 (now the PhD in Environmental Science and Management). PhD degrees were added in Teacher Education and Teacher Development in 2008, Counselor Education, Family Studies, Mathematics Education, Communications Sciences and Disorders by 2014, and most recently Clinical as well as Industrial/Organizational Psychology (2021). Of note, the Clinical and I/O Psychology PhD programs are fully funded programs. In 2018, Montclair State University graduated more than 30 doctoral students.

In 2004, NJ Transit opened the Montclair State University station, which links the university to New York City. The building of the MSU Station cost $26 million to complete, including a 1,500-space parking deck. In 2015, the university established the School of Communication and Media and added two new buildings to its campus; the Feliciano School of Business and the Center for Environmental and Life Sciences (CELS). Partridge Hall was fully renovated and in 2016, became the new School of Nursing, which welcomed its inaugural class of students that fall. In 2016, Montclair State University was designated by the U.S. Department of Education as a Hispanic-Serving Institution (HSI). In 2017, Montclair State was designated a public research university by the New Jersey Legislature. The new state-of-the-art home for the School of Communication and Media opened in fall 2017, followed in 2018 by the opening of the Center for Computing and Information Science in the former Mallory Hall, which underwent a complete renovation and expansion. In 2016, the university's classification was changed from a Masters to a Doctoral Research University, and in 2019, was changed to R2: Doctoral University – High Research Activity.

=== Presidents ===
Number	President	Years in office	Notes
–	Charles S. Chapin	1908–1924	Principal of New Jersey State Normal School at Montclair. Chapin Hall is named for him.
1	Harry A. Sprague	1924–1951	Principal, then first president of the College. Harry A. Sprague Library and Sprague Field are named for him.
2	E. DeAlton Partridge	1951–1964	Partridge Hall is dedicated to him.
3	Thomas H. Richardson	1964–1973	Acting president from 1964 to 1966. Namesake of Richardson Hall.
4	David W.D. Dickson	1973–1984	First African American president of the college. Dickson Hall is dedicated to him.
5	Donald E. Walters	1984–1987	Initiated an honors program, an international studies program and seminars on ethics and values.
6	Richard A. Lynde	1987–1989	Acting president
7	Irvin D. Reid	1989–1998	"...Spearheaded a successful effort to upgrade Montclair State from a college to a university... " Irvin D. Reid Hall is dedicated to him.
8	Gregory L. Waters	1997–1998	Acting president
9	Susan A. Cole	1998–2021	First female and Jewish president of the university. Susan A. Cole Hall is dedicated to her.
10	Jonathan G.S. Koppell	2021–present	Current president of the university

== Colleges and schools ==
Montclair State University comprises seven colleges and six schools, each led by a dean or director. The colleges and schools organize and conduct academic programs within their units (bachelor's, master's, doctoral, and certificate programs) and work cooperatively to offer interdisciplinary programs.

=== College of the Arts ===
==== John J. Cali School of Music ====
The John J. Cali School of Music is part of the College of the Arts. The Cali School of Music provides a wide range of study and performance opportunities for its undergraduate and graduate students, as well as a professional certification program in Music Education and the Artist's Diploma and Performer's Certificate degrees in classical and jazz performance. The noted string quartet, the Shanghai Quartet, was in residence at MSU from 2002 to 2020. As part of their new residency programs, the Cali School welcomed the Harlem Quartet as its new quartet-in-residence and introduced Jessie Montgomery as its composer-in-residence. In 2021, the Cali School implemented the Cali Pathways Project, a scholarship program designed to create dynamic and comprehensive pathways to higher education and careers in music for talented student musicians from underrepresented backgrounds.

==== College of Communication and Media ====
Initially the School of Communications and Media within the College of the Arts, CCOM launched as Montclair's newest college in July 2025.

The then-school opened a new facility in fall 2017. It features a 187-seat Sony Digital Cinema Presentation Hall, four broadcast-ready HD + 4K studio and control rooms, motion picture stage for digital filmmaking, and an audio production center featuring a Foley stage, a performance stage, and audio sound labs.

=== College of Education and Human Services ===
The College of Education and Human Services houses the Center of Pedagogy, with oversees the Teacher Education program. Majors across the university earning teacher credentials are administered jointly by the Center of Pedagogy and the department that houses the student's major.

=== College of Humanities and Social Sciences ===
The College of Humanities and Social Sciences at Montclair State offers 20 undergraduate majors and more than 40 minors. The College of Humanities and Social Sciences is the largest college by enrollment within Montclair State.

Montclair State supports and encourages interdisciplinary programs. In 2019, the College of Humanities and Social Sciences and the College of Science and Mathematics have teamed up to offer the only Master of Science in Computational Linguistics program in New Jersey.

=== College of Science and Mathematics ===
The College of Science and Mathematics (CSAM) offers programs in the natural, physical, life, and computational sciences. Located in Richardson Hall are the Department of Physics and Astronomy, Department of Chemistry and Biochemistry, and the Student Success Center. Reid Hall houses the Department of Biology and the Marine Biology and Coastal Sciences Program. The School of Computing and the Department of Mathematics are housed in the Center for Computing and Information Science.

The Center for Environmental and Life Sciences (CELS) houses the Department of Earth and Environmental Studies, which includes Earth and Environmental Science; Geographic, Environmental and Urban Studies; and Sustainability Science. CELS also houses the PSEG Institute for Sustainability Studies, New Jersey Center for Water Science and Technology, Clean Energy and Sustainability Analytics Center, Microscopy and Microanalysis Research Lab, Sokol Institute for Pharmaceutical and Life Sciences, and the interdisciplinary PhD Program in Environmental Science and Management.

=== Feliciano School of Business ===
The Feliciano School of Business offers undergraduate as well as MBA programs. Students may opt to choose the Bachelor of Arts approach or the Bachelor of Science. The school offers a BA degree program culminating in a Bachelor of Arts in Economics. In 2016, the MBA program became available in a fully online format. The School of Business also offers post-MBA certificate programs. In 2015 a brand new building for the Feliciano School of Business opened, dedicated to Mimi and Edwin Feliciano.

=== School of Nursing ===
In 2016, Montclair State University launched a School of Nursing. It offers RN-to-BSN and four-year BSN programs. The school is housed in a state-of-the-art facility that includes mediated classrooms, computer study areas, a nursing skills laboratory, anatomy laboratory, and high-fidelity and home care simulation rooms.

=== The Graduate School ===
Montclair State began offering master's degree programs in 1932, beginning with the Master of Fine Arts degree; the university began to grant doctoral degrees in 1998, after receiving state approval to establish a Doctor of Education degree in pedagogy and Doctor of Environmental Management degree in 2003. In the fall of 2019, the university had about 300 doctoral students in eight programs.

=== University College ===
University College is an initial academic home for students to pursue interests that will lead them to their eventual academic major. University College admits about one-third of incoming freshman, as well as approximately 1,400 returning and transfer students who have yet to declare a major. Once University College students have been admitted to their chosen majors, they transition into the college or school of that academic program.

== Rankings ==
Academic rankings

National
- U.S. News & World Report: 152
- Washington Monthly: 57

U.S. News & World Report listed Montclair State as No. 152 among all national universities in its 2025 rankings, tied for No. 12 in Top Performers on Social Mobility and tied for No. 81 in Top Public Schools. U.S. News & World Report 2025 Best Graduate Schools ranked several of the university's programs among the best in the nation, including its education program at 107th, its Master's in Public Health program tied for 140th, and its part-time Master's in Business Administration program 207th. Montclair State University's online Master of Arts in Educational Leadership program was ranked 25th in the nation in the U.S. News & World Report 2020 Best Online Programs rankings. The Feliciano School of Business was included in the 2020 edition of "The Best Business Schools" published by The Princeton Review. The Princeton Review Guide to Green Colleges: 2019 Edition included Montclair State in its rankings of America's greenest campuses. Money magazine ranked Montclair State among the nation's "Best Colleges for Your Money" in 2020. Money also ranked the university at No. 16 on its 2020 "Most Transformative Colleges" list. Campus Pride named Montclair State a "Premier Campus" in its 2020 Campus Pride Index, the national listing of LGBTQ-friendly colleges and universities. Montclair State earned the maximum five stars out of five, one of only two institutions in New Jersey to do so.

In 2024, Washington Monthly ranked Montclair State 57th among 438 national universities in the U.S. based on Montclair State's contribution to the public good, as measured by social mobility, research, and promoting public service.

== Campus ==
The original Montclair State University campus consisted of College Hall, Russ Hall, Chapin Hall and Morehead Hall, all built between 1908 and 1928. It was 2 miles south of the intersection of U.S. Route 46 and Route 3. Housing for students returning from World War II was added near the end of the war. Between 1950 and 1980, Montclair State gradually acquired land from a former traprock quarry and expanded its facilities with an additional 23 buildings. Montclair State University began its next phase of growth in the late 1990s to accommodate New Jersey's growing student population. Dickson Hall was dedicated in 1995. The building is named for David W.D. Dickson, the first African American president of Montclair State University. The Floyd Hall Arena, an ice skating rink, was built in 1998. Science Hall, the home of the Department of Biology, opened in 1999. The Red Hawk Diner was built in 2001, making it the first diner on a university campus in the United States.

=== Other additions (2002–2011) ===
- The Red Hawk Deck, MSU's first parking garage, opened in spring 2003
- The Village Apartments at Little Falls, an apartment complex accommodating 850 students, opened in fall 2003.
- The Women's Softball Stadium opened in 2004.
- The 500-seat Alexander Kasser Theater opened in fall 2004.
- The NJ Transit Montclair State University station and Parking Deck was opened October 20, 2004. It provides direct access to and from New York Penn Station, the city's main public transportation hub. This is also a major parking and transfer point on the Montclair-Boonton Line.
- The Children's Center, Montclair State University's daycare facility for children of students and faculty, opened in fall 2005.
- University Hall, the largest building on campus at the time and home of the College of Education and Human Services, opened in spring 2006.
- The George Segal Gallery, located on the fourth floor of the Red Hawk Deck, opened in spring 2006.
- Cafe Diem, a cafe attached to Sprague Library, opened in January 2007.
- Chapin Hall, nearly 100 years old, was completely renovated and expanded to house the new John J. Cali School of Music.
- A 77,000-square-foot (7,200 m^{2}) Student Recreation Center opened in spring 2008.
- Sinatra Hall, a new suite style residence hall near the Village, housing 300 undergraduate and graduate students, opened in August 2010.
- CarParc Diem, the largest parking structure at MSU with approximately 1,600 spaces, opened in August 2010.
- The Heights, two new housing complexes and a dining facility accommodating 2,000 students, opened August 2011.

=== Capital master plan (2013–2018) ===
Montclair's most recent master plan contained $650 million in capital construction and improvements. The major projects under this new program were:

- Two student housing and dining complexes, The Heights, are adjacent to the Student Recreation Center and CarParc Diem Garage. Opened in August 2011, they house approximately 2,000 students, increasing the on-campus housing capacity to 5,500, the second largest college residential population in New Jersey after Rutgers University in New Brunswick. They have also increased dining capacity at MSU by 25,000 gross square feet.
- A 143,000 square feet (13,300 m^{2}) building to house the Feliciano School of Business, adjacent to University Hall. It opened in fall 2015.
- The 107,500 square feet (9,990 m^{2}) Center for Environmental and Life Sciences building, located adjacent to Richardson Hall, opened in 2015. CELS houses the Department of Earth and Environmental Studies and all of its research facilities, the Microscopy and Microanalysis Research Laboratory, the Margaret and Herman Sokol Institute for Pharmaceutical Life Sciences, the New Jersey Center for Water Science and Technology, the PSEG Institute for Sustainability Studies, and the interdisciplinary PhD program in Environmental Science and Management. The majority of the funding for this facility came from a bond issue passed by statewide referendum on November 6, 2012.
- A 60,000 square feet (5,600 m^{2}) expansion of Morehead Hall, which connects the building with Life Hall and the DuMont TV center to form the Communication and Media Studies Center.
- Various expansions, improvements and renovations of residential buildings, athletic facilities, and academic facilities including College Hall, Partridge Hall, Mallory Hall (now the Center for Computing and Information Science), Life Hall, the Bond House, and Richardson Hall.
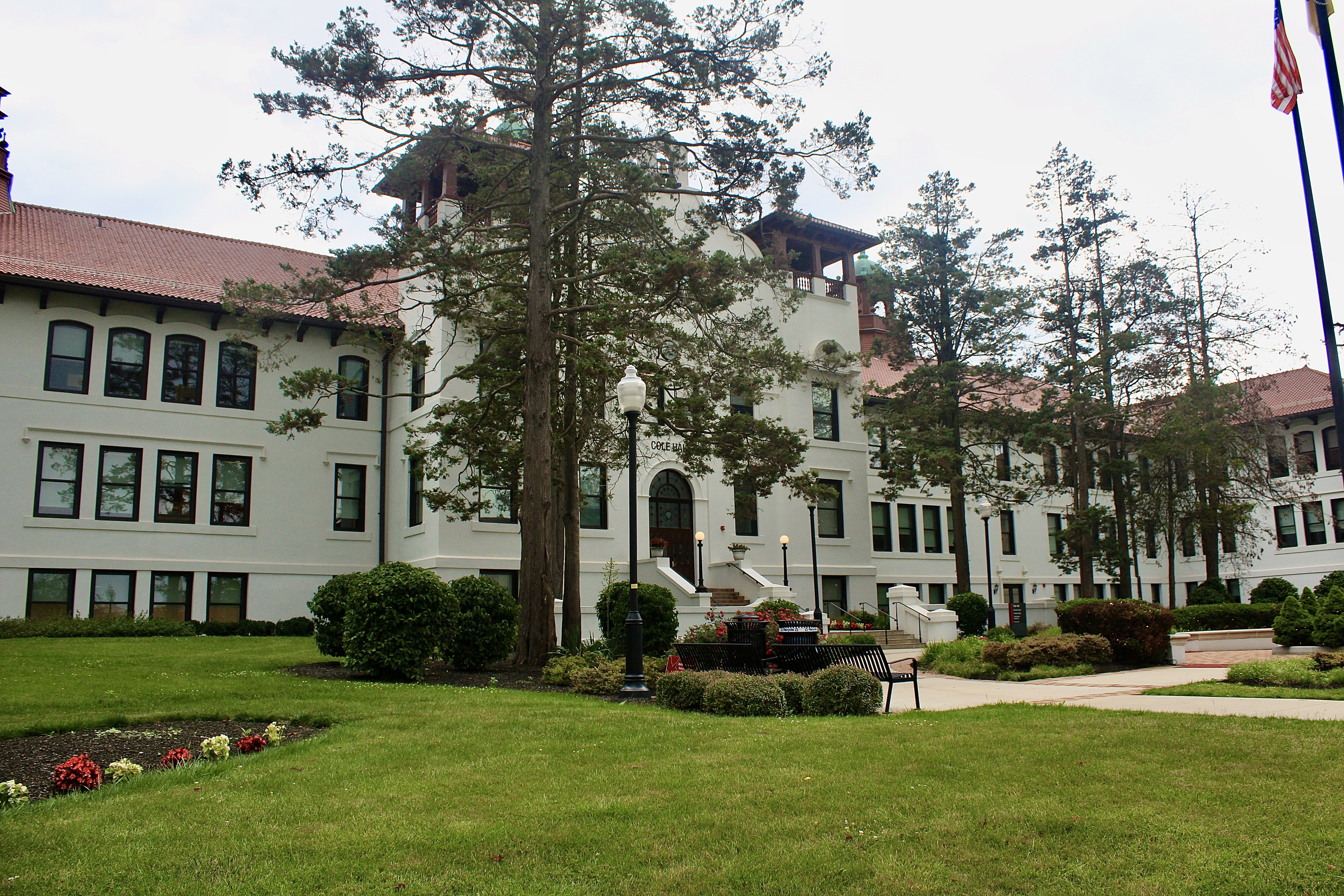
The new "Susan Cole Hall", main college hall for the university)

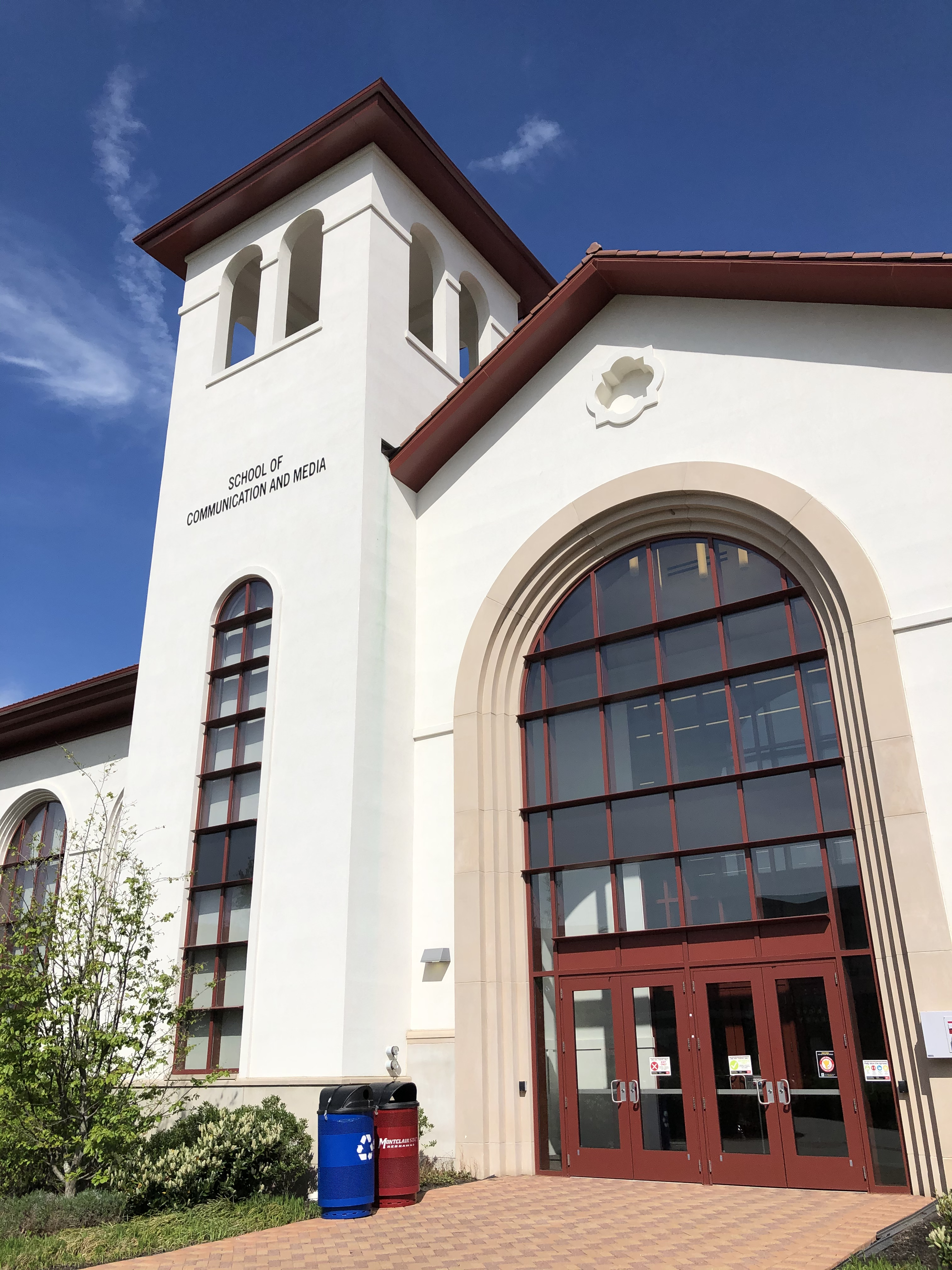
School of Communications and Media

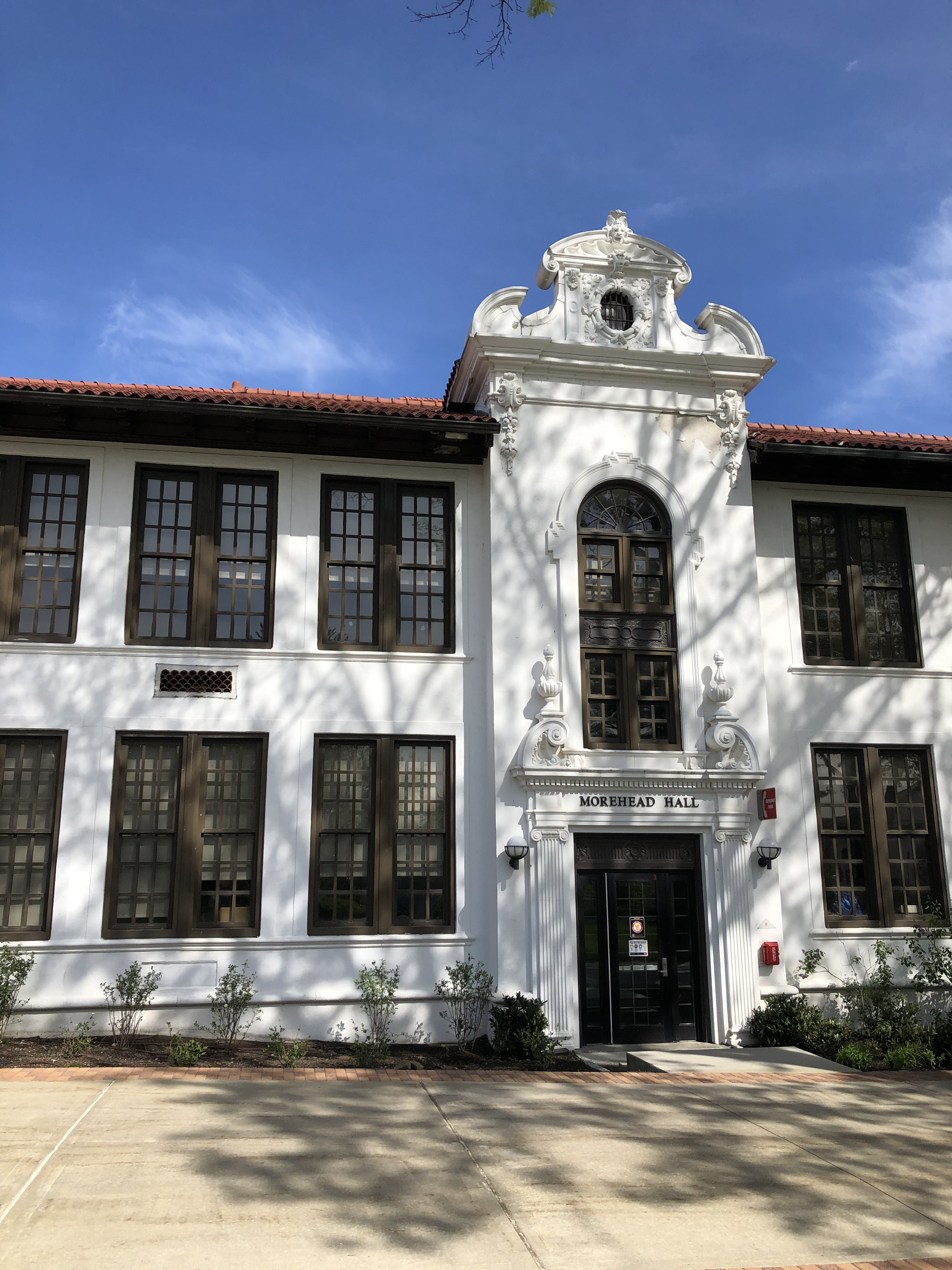
Morehead Hall, built in 1928

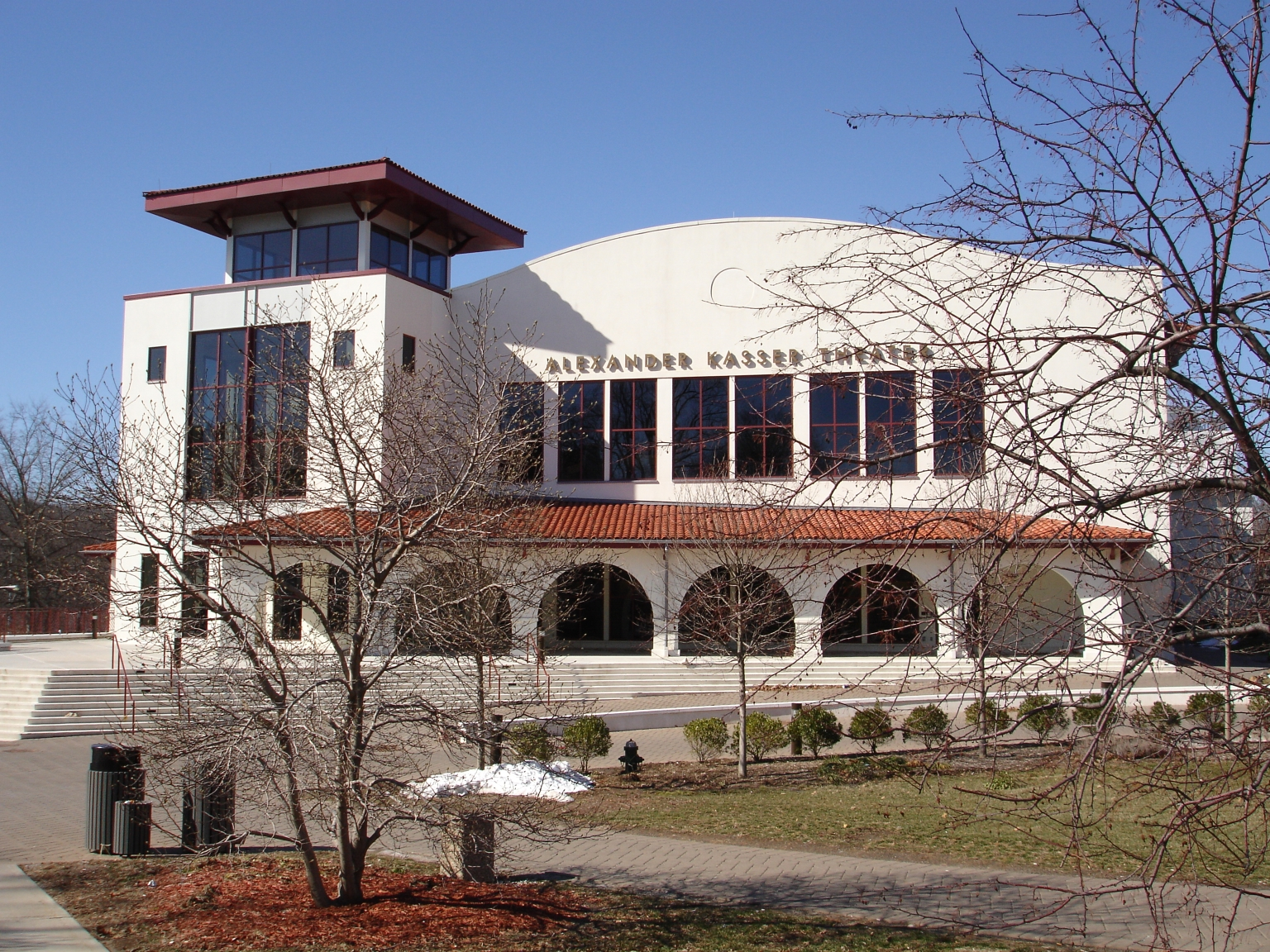
Alexander Kasser Theater

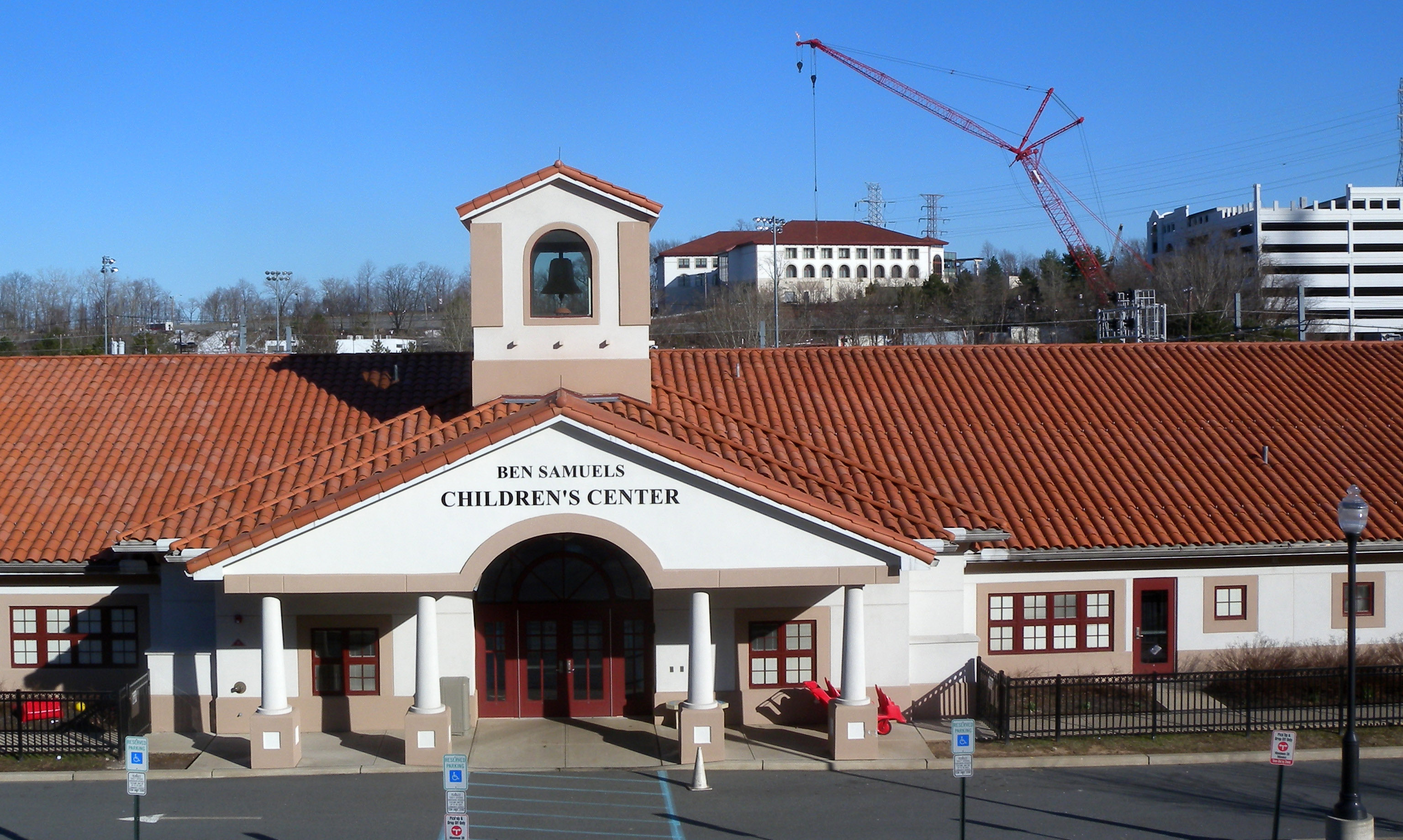
Ben Samuel's Children Center

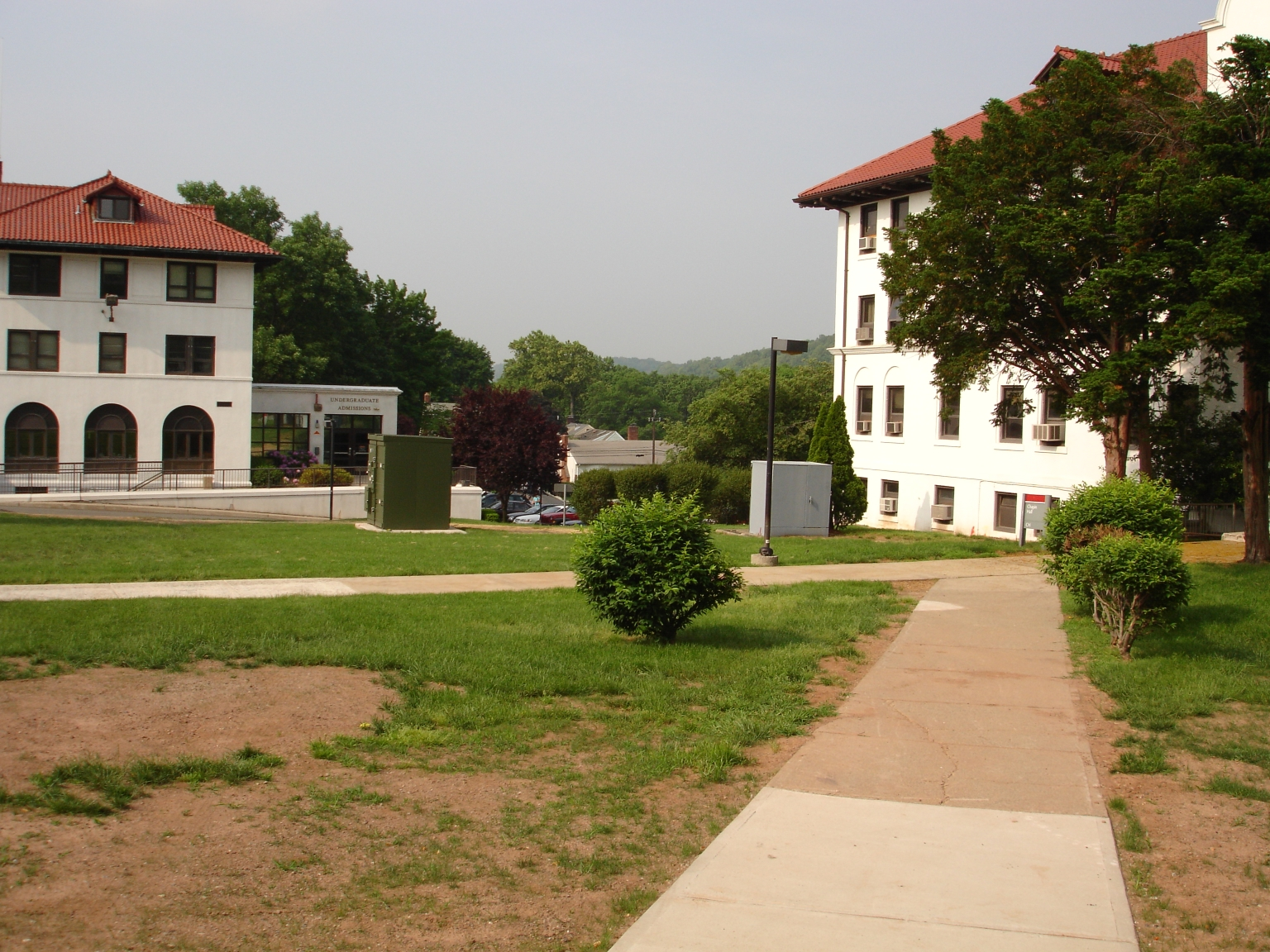
Chapin Hall

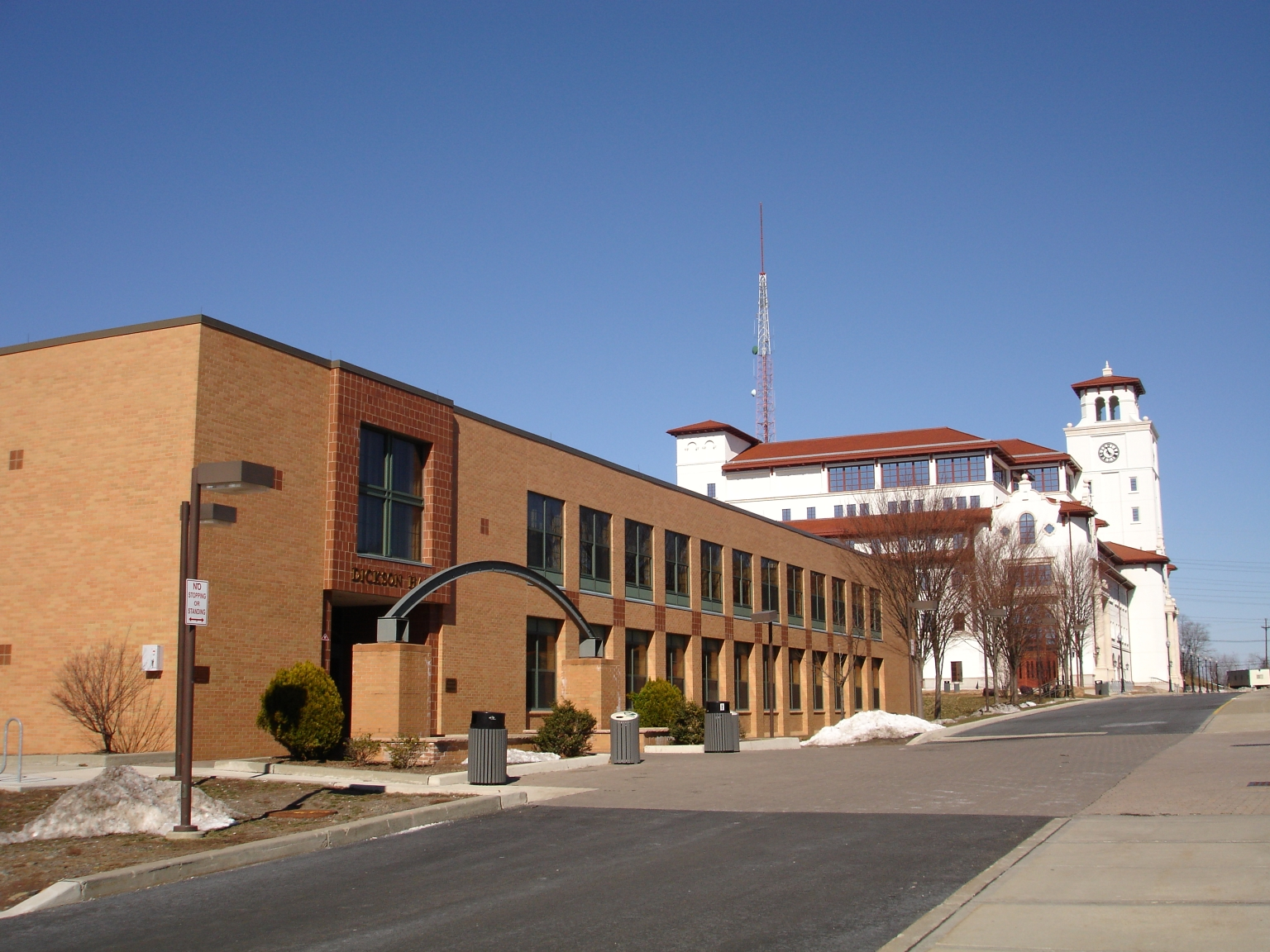
Dickson & University Hall

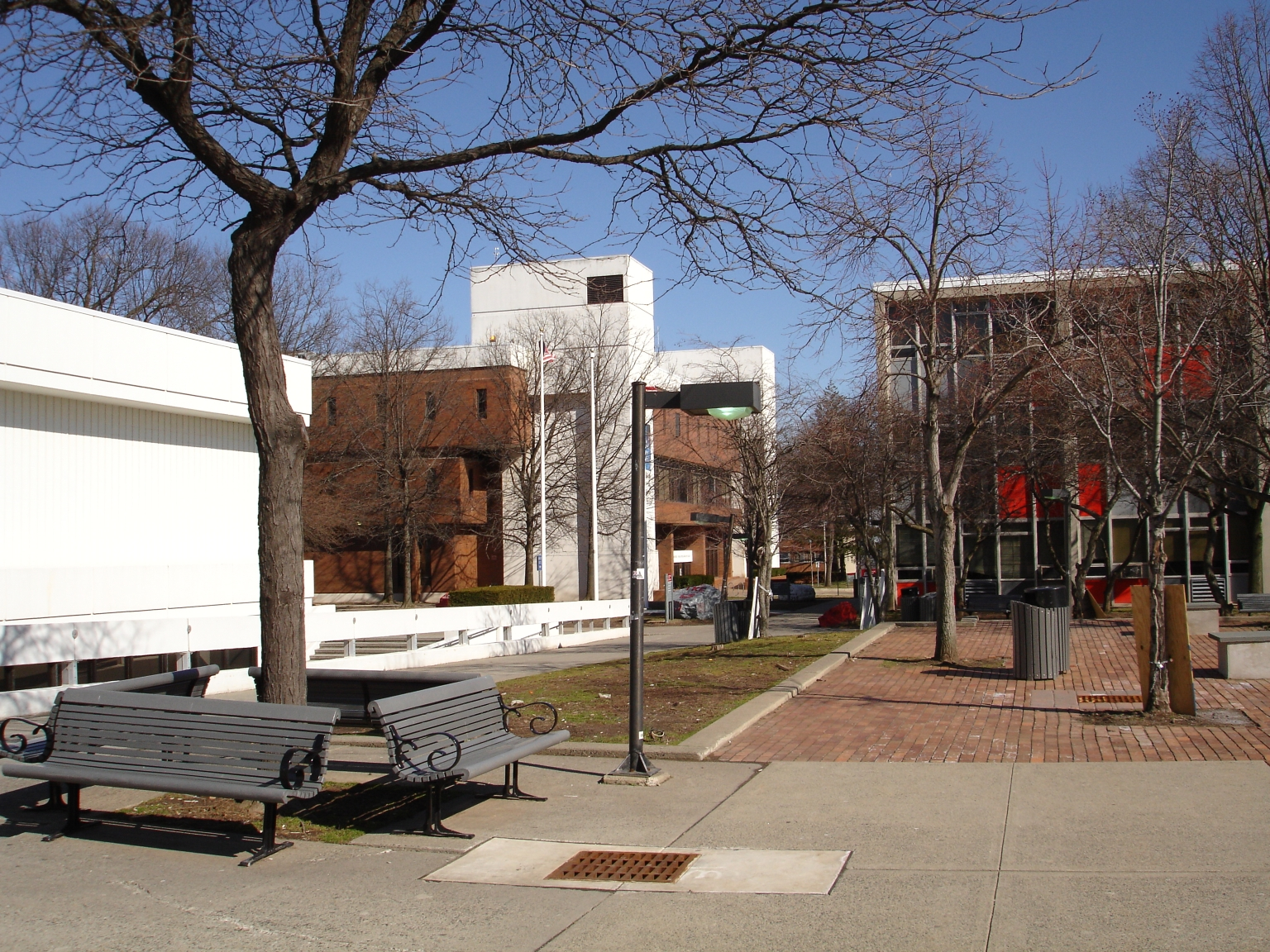
Richardson & Mallory Halls

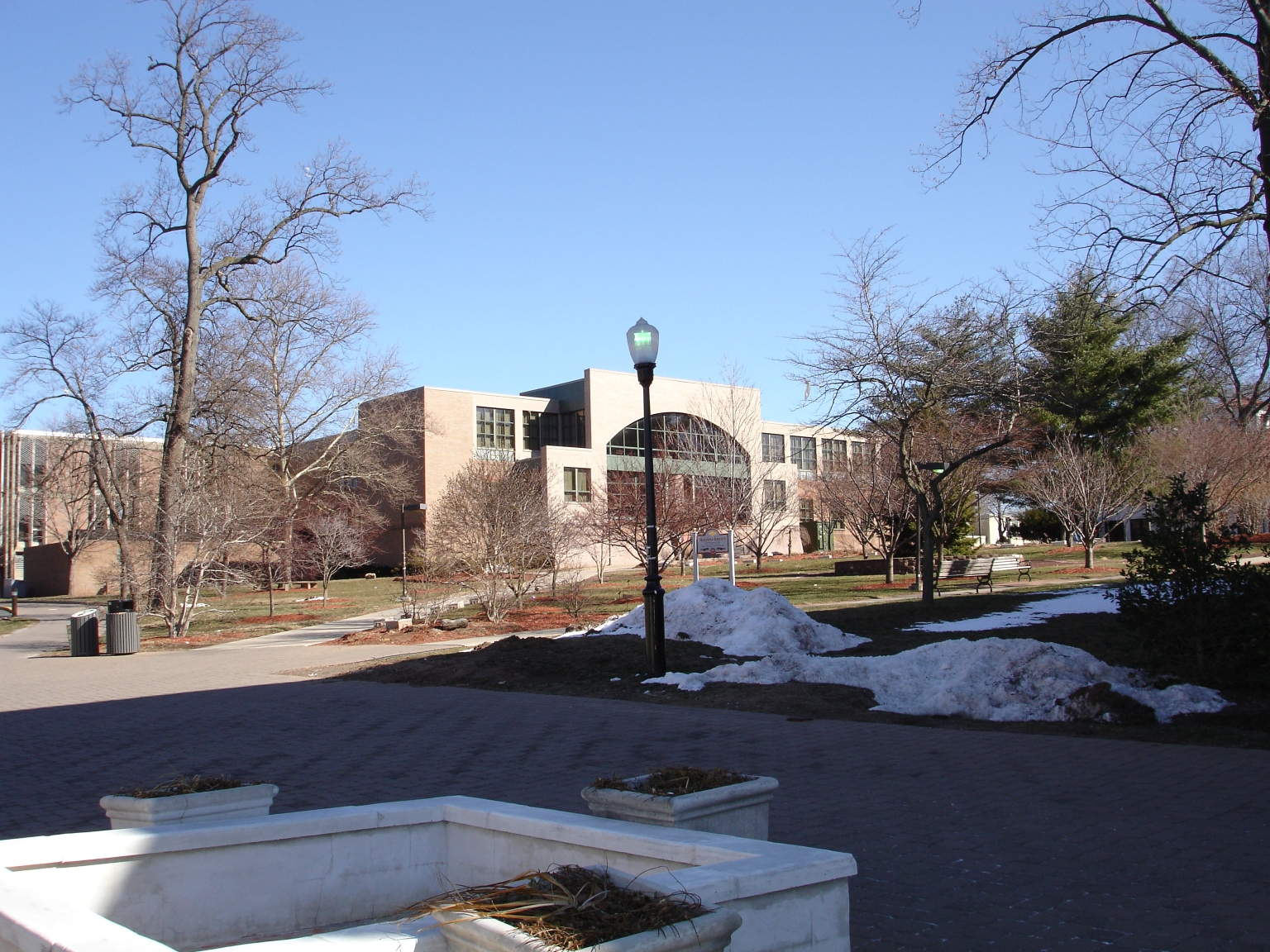
Sprague Library

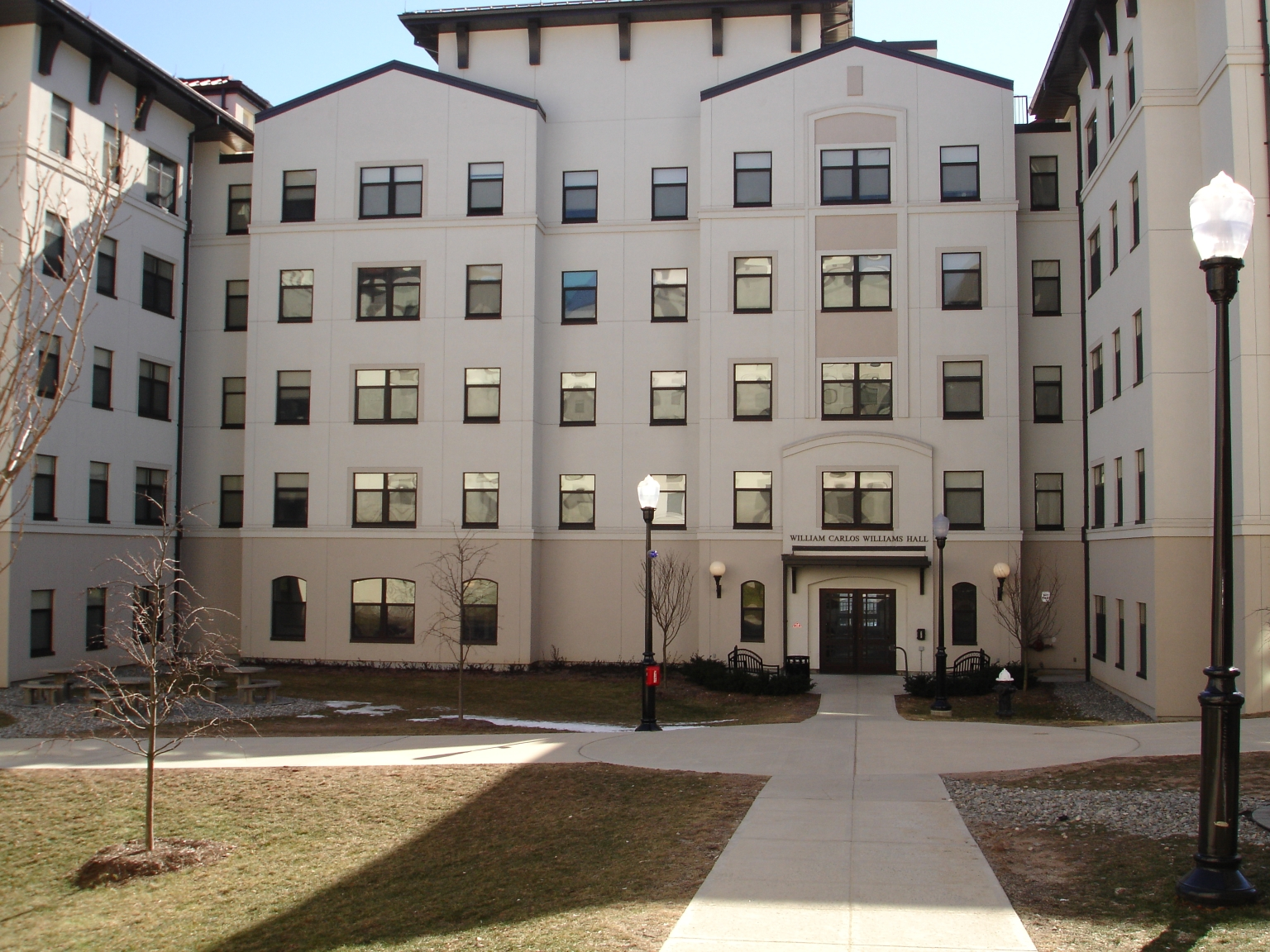
MSU Village

== Census-designated place ==
Undergraduate demographics as of Fall 2023
Race and ethnicity	Total
Hispanic	39%
White	33%
Black	13%
Asian	6%
Unknown	5%
Two or more races	2%
International student	1%
Economic diversity
Low-income (Note: The percentage of students who received an income-based federal Pell grant intended for low-income students.)	45%
Affluent (Note: The percentage of students who are a part of the American middle class at the bare minimum.)	55%

Montclair State University CDP
- Census-designated place
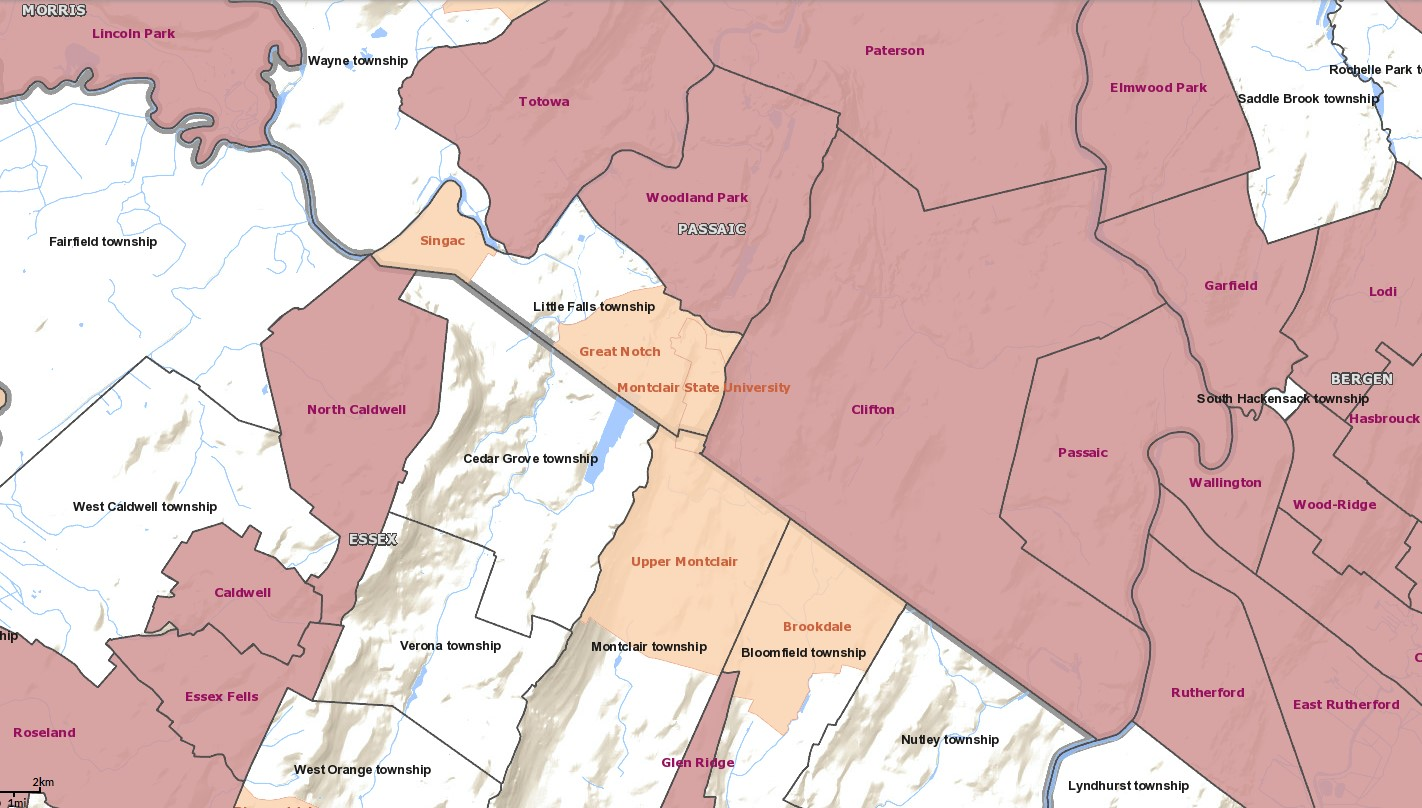
- Interactive map of Montclair State University CDP
- Country: United States
- State: New Jersey
- County: Passaic, Essex

Area
  - Total: 0.36 sq mi (0.92 km^{2})
  - Land: 0.36 sq mi (0.92 km^{2})
  - Water: 0 sq mi (0.00 km^{2})
- Elevation: 364 ft (111 m)

Population (2020)
  - Total: 2,180
  - Density: 6,127.2/sq mi (2,365.73/km^{2})
- Time zone: UTC– 05:00 (Eastern (EST))
  - Summer (DST): UTC– 04:00 (Eastern (EDT))
- FIPS code: 34-47524
- GNIS: 2806142

Montclair State University is a census-designated place (CDP) covering the Montclair State University campus in Passaic and Essex counties.

It first appeared as a CDP in the 2020 Census with a population of 2,180.

=== Demographics ===
Historical population
Census	Pop.	Note	%±
2020	2,180		—
U.S. Decennial Census; 2020

==== 2020 census ====
Montclair State University CDP, New Jersey – racial and ethnic composition Note: the US Census treats Hispanic/Latino as an ethnic category. This table excludes Latinos from the racial categories and assigns them to a separate category. Hispanics/Latinos may be of any race.
Race / ethnicity (NH = Non-Hispanic)	Pop 2020	% 2020
White alone (NH)	878	40.28%
Black or African American alone (NH)	695	31.88%
Native American or Alaska Native alone (NH)	0	0.00%
Asian alone (NH)	119	5.46%
Native Hawaiian or Pacific Islander alone (NH)	0	0.00%
Other race alone (NH)	1	0.05%
Mixed-race or multiracial (NH)	43	1.97%
Hispanic or Latino (any race)	444	20.37%
Total	2,180	100.00%

== Athletics ==
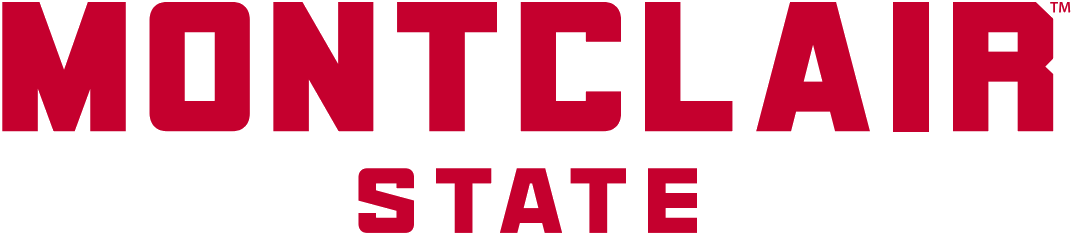
Montclair State athletics wordmark

Montclair State University's athletic teams have played under many names in the school's history. From the late 1920s to '30s, the school played as the "Big Red" and featured a large scarlet "M" on its uniforms. Next, Montclair State Teacher's College competed as the Indians, using a logo with a Native American chief's profile with the initials "MSTC" emblazoned on the caricature's headdress.

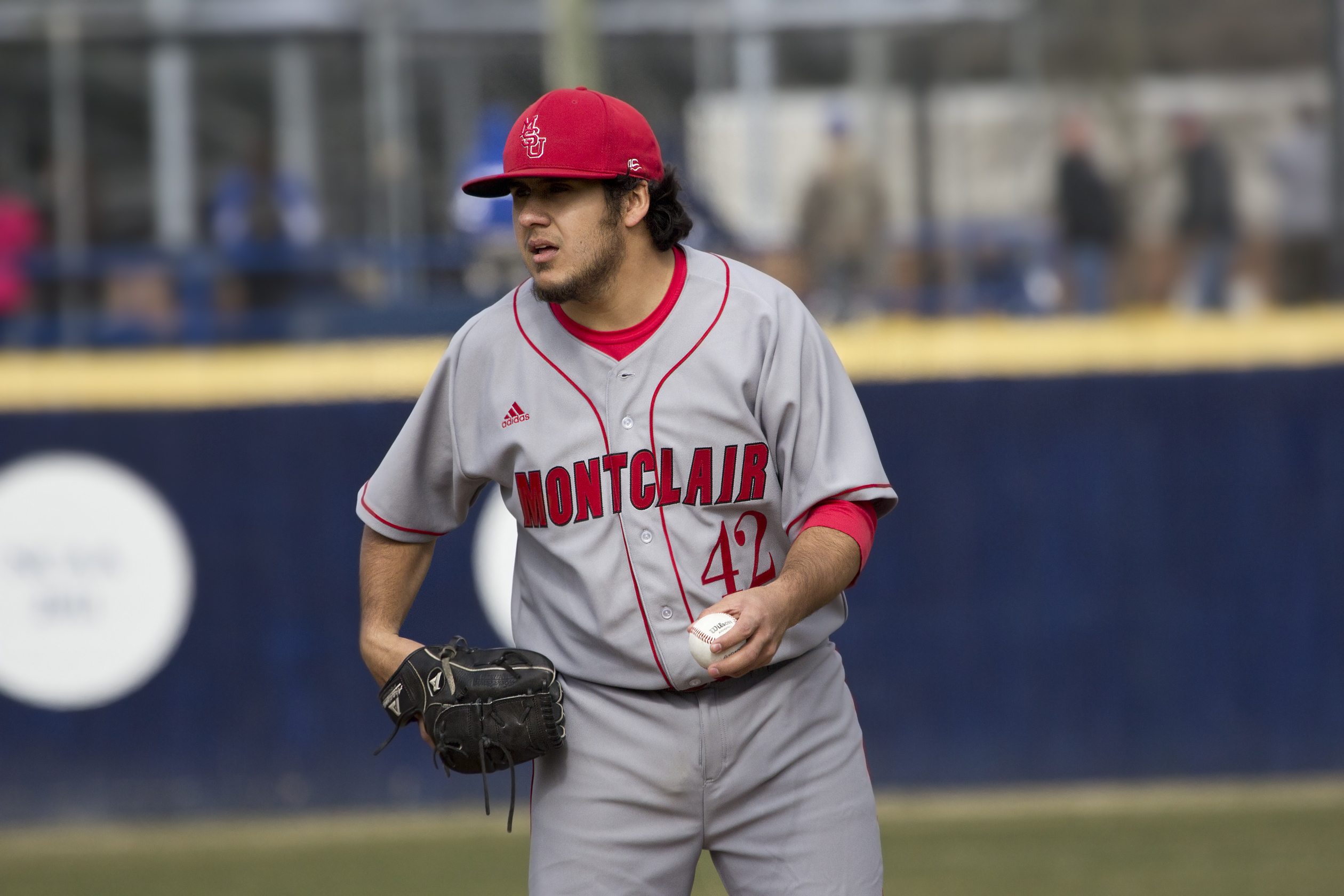
A Montclair baseball player in 2014

The initials were changed to "MSC" when the school became Montclair State College in 1958. In response to the growing concerns voiced by Native Americans, the school changed its nickname to the Red Hawks in August 1989, named after the Red-tailed hawks that are indigenous to the area. Montclair's athletic teams all play in the NCAA Division III (Campus Teams). The 2023 season for the men's soccer team was noteworthy with an NJAC Division title and competition in the semifinal round of the national championship.

=== Division III sports ===
Montclair State University athletics are in the NCAA Division III in the New Jersey Athletic Conference (NJAC). The university offers the following sports:

Fall sports

- Women's cross country
- Men's football
- Men's soccer
- Women's soccer
- Field hockey
- Women's volleyball

Winter sports

- Men's basketball
- Women's basketball
- Men's swimming and diving
- Women's swimming and diving
- Men's indoor track and field
- Women's indoor track and field

Spring sports

- Men's baseball
- Men's lacrosse (Coastal Lacrosse Conference)
- Women's lacrosse
- Women's softball
- Men's outdoor track and field
- Women's outdoor track and field

=== Club sports ===
- Men's ice hockey (ACHA Division II)
- Women's ice hockey (ACHA Division II)
- Men's rugby (MetNY RFU Division II)
- Men's volleyball (Middle Atlantic Collegiate Volleyball Conference)
- Baseball (National Club Baseball Association (NCBA) Division II Central)
- Men's lacrosse (National College Lacrosse League, NY Metro Conference, Division II)
- Quidditch (unofficial with the International Quidditch Association as of spring 2015)

=== Sports fields and facilities ===
- Sprague Field: The 6,000-seat field is home to the MSU football team, men's and women's lacrosse and field hockey teams.
- Panzer Athletic Center Gymnasium: The 1,200-seat arena is home to the MSU men's and women's basketball teams and volleyball team.
- Panzer Athletic Center Pool: The 500-seat Panzer Pool is home to the Red Hawk men's and women's swimming and diving teams.
- MSU Soccer Park at Pittser Field: The 3,000-seat artificial turf field, which opened in 1998, is the main home for both the men's and women's soccer teams. Starting in 2017, Pittser Field was the home of New York Red Bulls II.
- Yogi Berra Stadium: The 3,400-seat stadium is home to the MSU baseball team and the Yogi Berra Museum. It was the former home of the New Jersey Jackals of the independent Frontier League from 1998 to 2022.
- MSU Softball Stadium: The 300-seat stadium opened its doors in 2004 and is home to the MSU softball team, and also hosted the 2009 NCAA Division III Women's College World Series.
- Montclair State University Ice Arena: The ice skating arena, formerly known as Floyd Hall Arena, opened in March 1998 with two NHL size rinks, an off-ice training area, meeting rooms, concession stand, pro shop, and facilities for birthday parties. The arena now attracts over 500,000 visits per year and has become the home to many groups including The MSU Hockey Club, the Montclair Hockey Club, The North Jersey Figure Skating Club, the Clifton HS Mustangs and Nutley and Passaic Valley High School Hockey Teams. In 2020, the arena was acquired by the university and re-named Montclair State University Ice Arena.
- Student Recreation Center: The 77,000-square-foot facility is home to two fitness floors, a six-lane swimming pool, two racquetball courts, a full-size basketball court with an overhead track, and two multi-purpose rooms. Montclair State University's Student Recreation Center hosts 13 intramural sports, a variety of fitness classes, and many special events throughout each year.

== Notable alumni ==
=== Science and technology ===
- William E. Gordon (1918–2010), physicist and astronomer, known as the "father of the Arecibo Observatory", director of the Arecibo Observatory and later professor and dean at Rice University; earned B.A. and M. A. degrees from Montclair State College in 1939 and 1942 respectively
- Paul J. Lioy (1947–2015), professor, UMDNJ, Robert Wood Johnson Medical School
- Herman Sokol (1916–1985), co-discoverer of tetracycline and president of Bristol-Myers Company, graduated from Montclair State College

=== Politics and government ===
- Barbara Buono (born 1953), former New Jersey state senator and former New Jersey Democratic gubernatorial nominee
- Andrew R. Ciesla (born 1953), former member of the New Jersey Senate who represented the 10th Legislative District
- Marion Crecco (1930–2015), member of the New Jersey General Assembly from 1986 to 2002
- Scott Garrett (born 1959), congressman who represented New Jersey's 5th congressional district 2003–2016
- Sharpe James (1936–2025), mayor of Newark
- Connie Myers (born 1944), politician who served in the New Jersey General Assembly 1996–2006, where she represented the 23rd Legislative District
- Joan Voss (born 1940; B.A. 1962 / M.A. 1971), member of the Bergen County, New Jersey Board of Chosen Freeholders

=== Business and industry ===
- Howie Hubler, Morgan Stanley bond trader whose positions on subprime-mortgage-related securities cost Morgan Stanley $9 billion in 2007
- Janine K. Iannarelli (born 1961), aircraft broker, founder and president an aircraft marketing firm
- A. J. Khubani (born 1959), founder, president and CEO of Telebrands Corp.

=== Arts and entertainment ===
- Jay Alders (class of 1996), fine artist, photographer and graphic designer, best known for his original surf art paintings
- Tobin Bell (born 1942), actor, earned master's degree in environmental education
- Jason Biggs (born 1978), actor who briefly attended as an English major
- Edna Buchanan (born 1939), reporter and mystery writer
- Kevin Carolan (born 1968, class of 1990), actor and comedian
- Lesley Choyce (born 1951), author of novels, non-fiction, children's books, and poetry
- Wendy Coakley-Thompson (born 1966, class of 1989), writer, studied broadcasting
- Paula Danziger (1944–2004), children's author who wrote more than 30 books, including her 1974 debut young adult novel, The Cat Ate My Gymsuit
- Josh Dela Cruz (born 1989, class of 2011), host of Blue's Clue & You, a reboot of the Nickelodeon series Blue's Clues
- Warren Farrell (born 1943, class of 1965), author
- Fernando Fiore (born 1960), television personality, sportscaster, actor, two-time Emmy award winner
- Michele Fitzgerald (born 1990), television personality, winner, Survivor: Kaôh Rōng
- Allen Ginsberg (1926–1997), poet; icon of the Beat Generation, briefly attended before transferring to Columbia University

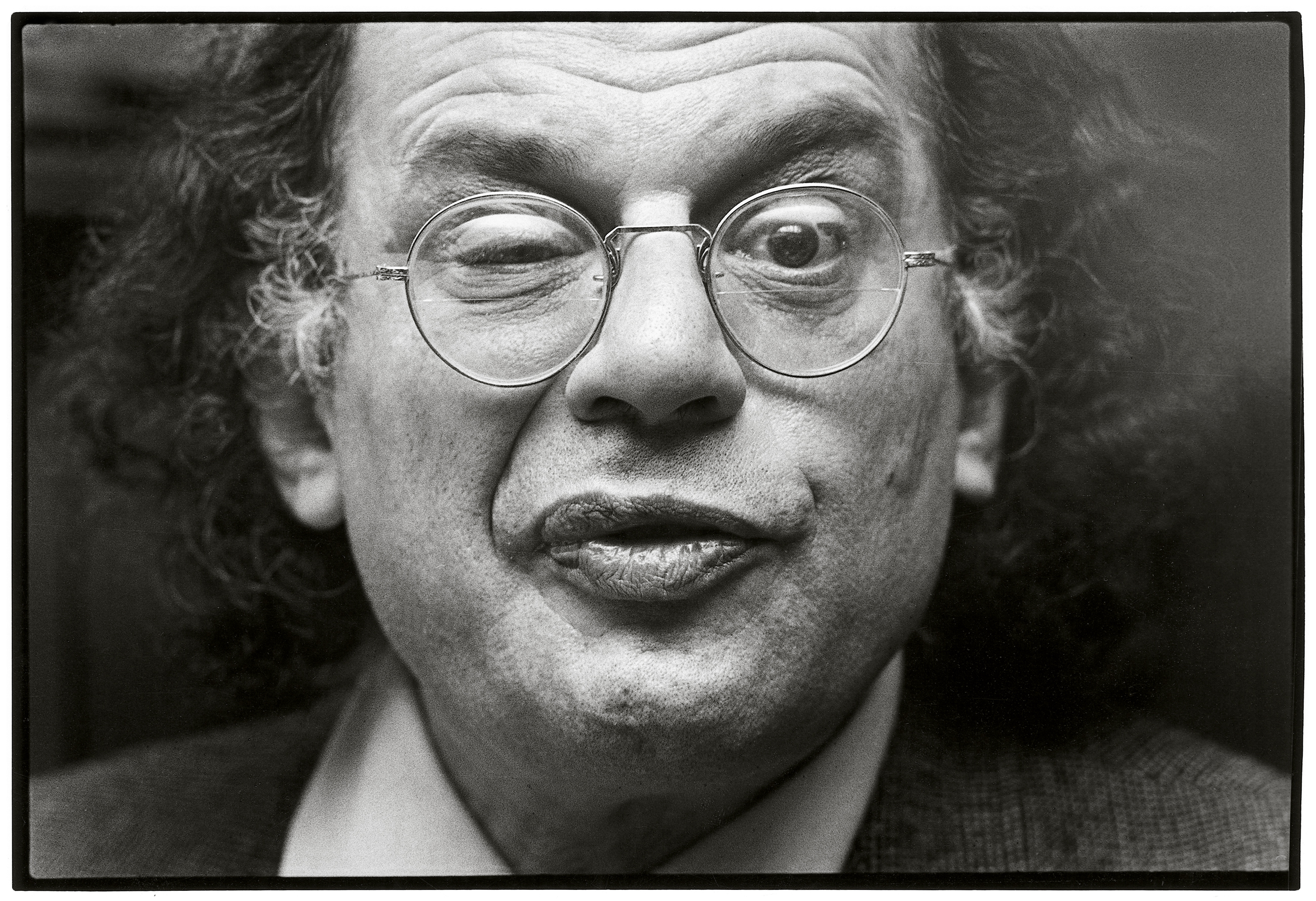
Allen Ginsberg, briefly attended

- Camille Grammer (born 1968), reality television personality
- Terri L. Jewell (1954–1995), author, poet and Black lesbian activist
- Brian Jude (born 1971, class of 1995), film director, writer, producer and actor
- Jayna Ledford, transgender ballet dancer
- Gaspard Louis, dancer and choreographer
- Olivia Lux (born 1994), drag queen, performed on season 13 of Rupaul's Drag Race, graduated as a theater major class of 2016
- Tom Malloy (born 1974, class of 1997), film actor, writer and producer
- Robert Marks, vocal coach, music arranger, accompanist, author, and music director
- Rob McClure (born 1982), actor
- Melba Moore (born 1945), singer
- J. J. North (born 1964), actress
- Chris Opperman (born 1978), composer
- Michael Price (class of 1981), television writer–producer
- Robert M. Price (born 1954, class of 1976), Biblical scholar known as The Bible Geek and The Human Bible, H. P. Lovecraft scholar
- Dania Ramirez (born 1979), film and television actress
- Redman (born 1970, rapper who was expelled as a freshman
- George Rochberg (1918–2005), composer (English major)
- Lorene Scafaria (born 1978), screenwriter and playwright who directed the film Hustlers
- Thank You Scientist, progressive rock band formed at Montclair State in 2009
- Ray Toro (born 1977), lead guitarist of My Chemical Romance
- Justina Valentine (born 1987), rapper, MTV Personality
- Jessica Vosk (born 1983), singer/actress, appeared as Elphaba in the national tour of the hit musical Wicked
- Mikey Way (born 1980), bassist of My Chemical Romance (dropped out)
- Steve Way (born 1990), actor, comedian, and disability rights advocate
- Dave White (born 1979), Derringer Award-winning mystery author
- Bruce Willis (born 1955), actor; attended as a theatre major

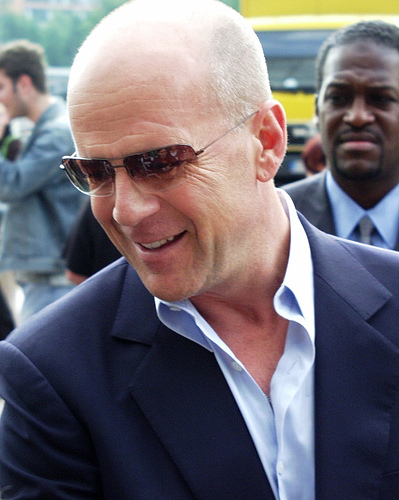
Bruce Willis, theatre major

=== Sports ===
- Kim Barnes Arico (born 1970), head women's basketball coach at the University of Michigan Women's Basketball Halls of Fame; former general manager and president of the New York Liberty
- Carol Blazejowski (born 1956), basketball player and member of the Naismith Memorial Basketball Hall of Fame
- Anthony Bowens (born 1990), professional wrestler, signed to All Elite Wrestling
- Marco Capozzoli (born 1988), arena football player
- Mark Casale (born 1962), football player
- Kevin Cooney (born 1950), college baseball coach at Montclair State and Florida Atlantic
- Amod Field (born 1967), football player
- Mike Fratello (born 1947), NBA head coach, sports commentator
- Keith Glauber (born 1972), Major League Baseball player
- Larry Hazzard (born 1944), boxing referee, member of the International Boxing Hall of Fame (graduated with a bachelor of arts degree, 1972)
- Fred Hill (born 1959), Rutgers University basketball coach
- Sam Mills (1959–2005), NFL linebacker, coach, member of College Football Hall of Fame and Pro Football Hall of Fame

=== Others ===
- Dorothy Beecher Baker (1898–1954) Hand of the Cause of the Baháʼí Faith
- Olga Grau (born 1945), Chilean writer, professor, philosopher
- Eugene T. Maleska (1916–1993, class of 1937), crossword editor at The New York Times
- Nelson J. Perez (born 1961), prelate of the Roman Catholic Church, 10th archbishop of the Archdiocese of Philadelphia
- Ma Anand Sheela (born 1949), chief assistant for the Indian guru Rajneesh who in 1985 pleaded guilty to attempted murder and assault for her role in the 1984 Rajneeshee bioterror attack.

== Notable faculty ==
- Brenda Miller Cooper (1916–2008), operatic soprano
- Grover Furr
- Ken Kelsch (1947–2023), cinematographer (also alumni)
- Dorothy Priesing (1910–1999), composer
