= Janine K. Iannarelli =

American business executive

Janine K. Iannarelli (born March 15, 1961) is an aircraft broker who entered the business aviation industry while a senior in college. She is the founder and president of the aircraft marketing firm Par Avion Ltd, and has worked for over 30 years in the business aviation industry, having represented numerous corporations and private individuals worldwide in the sale and purchase of business aircraft.

== Professional information ==
Iannarelli established Par Avion, with an aim of specializing in the exclusive representation and acquisition of business aircraft.

Ms. Iannarelli has also worked directly with designated representatives of the Federal Aviation Administration, and with many other countries’ civil aviation authorities where she has placed or procured aircraft.

Iannarelli has attended numerous industry-related seminars sponsored by the National Business Aviation Association (NBAA), Professional Aviation Maintenance Association and various manufacturers and aviation product vendors. She has served as a speaker at the European Business Aviation Association conference, to the WAI Space City chapter, and local executive and professional development groups. In 2010, Iannarelli was invited by AVBuyer.com to become a business aviation industry blogger – Jottings From a Business Aviation Sales Professional.

She is a current member of the National Business Aviation Association (NBAA), European Business Aviation Association (EBAA), the Houston Aviation Advisory Association, Women in Aviation, International (WAI), and the American Marketing Association (AMA).

In October 2014, Ms. Iannarelli was appointed by Governor Perry to the Texas Aerospace and Aviation Advisory Committee. As a committee member, she seeks out and encourages business development specific to her area of expertise in the State. In 2011, Fort Worth Business Press was one of 18 women named as a Great Woman of Texas.

Iannarelli previously served as vice president of sales and marketing for AeroSmith/Penny, and as the first employee for the AMSTAT Corporation, assisting in the development of their research and customer databases. She is known as the Falcon Lady.

== Early life and education ==
The third child of Jean and Anthony Iannarelli, Janine Iannarelli was born in Fair Lawn, New Jersey. Of Italian descent, she has three siblings—Susan; Anthony, an attorney in northern New Jersey; and John who serves as the assistant special agent in charge for the FBI's Phoenix office.

Janine Iannarelli attended Fair Lawn Public Schools where she was active in music programs. She is a 1983 graduate of Montclair State University, where she earned a BSc in business administration with a specific concentration in marketing and a minor in psychology. She then moved to Houston, where she studied the French language at L'Alliance Francaise de Houston. and earned continuing education credits from Rice University.

Iannarelli is an accomplished equestrian who began horseback riding at an early age and continues this through adulthood. She is a member of the United States Equestrian Federation and Texas Hunter Jumper Association. She competed for more than 30 years in the amateur divisions at hunter/jumper shows at the regional and national level in the United States. Additionally, Iannarelli is an avid cyclist and includes yoga and other strength building activities to her personal fitness regime.

== Charitable causes ==
Iannarelli is a supporter of the arts and charities that benefit children and animals. A current board member of Mercury, The Orchestra Refined, she served as underwriting chair of the inaugural 2009 gala and co-chair for the 2010 gala both of which netted in excess of $100,000 in contributions.

For more than 25 years, she was a corporate sponsor, board member, competitor and volunteer with The Pin Oak Charity Horse Show, which benefits Texas Children's Hospital and the Ronald McDonald House. In 2012, Janine joined the Texas Children's Hospital as an Ambassador for the new Pavilion for Women. In 2002, Janine was recruited to chair the Houston Chapter of the National Women's Board and Friends of Northwood University. She is a founding member of the Peace Parks Foundation headquartered in Stellenbosch, South Africa.
