= Simone Iannarelli =

Italian composer and classical guitarist

Simone Iannarelli is a composer and classical guitarist born in Rome, Italy, in 1970.

He is professor of guitar in Mexico, at the University of Colima's Faculty of Fine Arts Music Department. His works are published by Guitar Solo Publications and other publishers.
