= 1989 Pacific typhoon season =

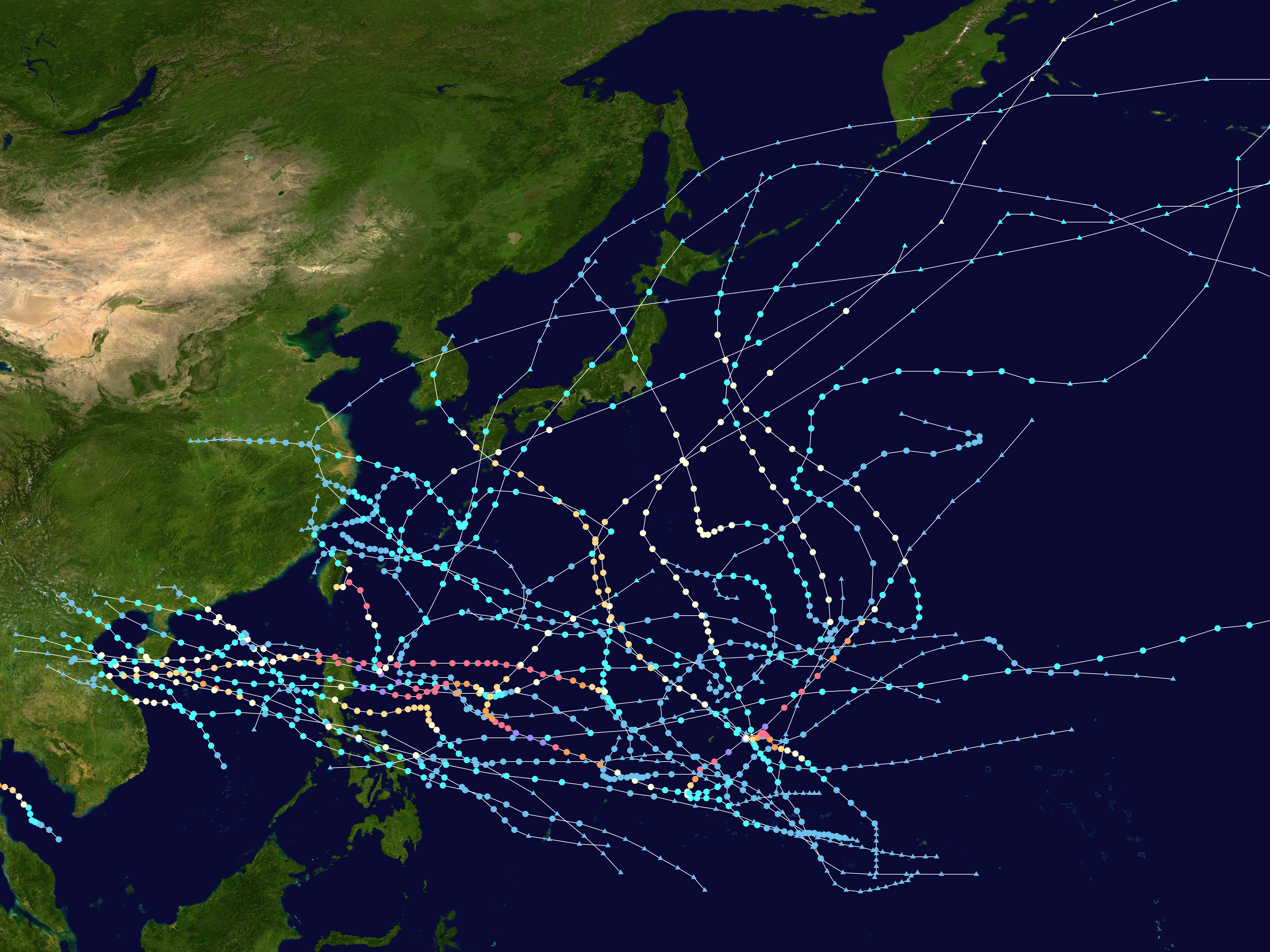
- Season summary map

Seasonal boundaries
- First system formed: January 15, 1989
- Last system dissipated: December 27, 1989

Strongest storm
- Name: Gordon and Elsie
  - Maximum winds: 185 km/h (115 mph) (10-minute sustained)
  - Lowest pressure: 915 hPa (mbar)

Seasonal statistics
- Total depressions: 55
- Total storms: 32
- Typhoons: 20
- Very strong typhoons: 9
- Violent typhoons: 0
- ACE: 305 units
- Total fatalities: 3,535 total
- Total damage: $2.37 billion (1989 USD)

Related articles
- 1989 Atlantic hurricane season; 1989 Pacific hurricane season; 1989 North Indian Ocean cyclone season

The 1989 Pacific typhoon season was the second consecutive to have above average tropical cyclone activity. It was an extremely active season reaching 32 tropical storms, 20 typhoons and five super typhoons. It has no official bounds; it ran year-round in 1989, but most tropical cyclones tend to form in the northwestern Pacific Ocean between May and November. These dates conventionally delimit the period of each year when most tropical cyclones form in the northwestern Pacific Ocean. The first storm, Winona, formed on January 15, while the final storm, Jack, dissipated on December 27. This season was also quite a deadly season that were caused by a few notable storms such as Tropical Storm Cecil, which was the worst storm to impact Vietnam in over 50 years, and Typhoon Gay, which directly impacted the Malay Peninsula as the worst typhoon in 35 years. Both of these storms make up around half of the total fatalities of the entire season alone.

The scope of this article is limited to the Pacific Ocean, north of the equator and between 100°E and 180th meridian. Tropical Storms formed in the entire west pacific basin were assigned a name by the Joint Typhoon Warning Center. Tropical depressions in this basin have the "W" suffix added to their number. Tropical depressions that enter or form in the Philippine area of responsibility are assigned a name by the Philippine Atmospheric, Geophysical and Astronomical Services Administration or PAGASA.

== Season summary ==
Throughout 1989, several large-scale factors across the western Pacific Ocean displaced unusual characteristics that presented unique difficulties to forecasters. In their annual tropical cyclone report for 1989, the Joint Typhoon Warning Center regarded the season as one of the most challenging and unique years in their history. During much of the year, a very broad monsoon trough was present and resulted in significant diurnal fluctuations in convective activity that inhibited rapid development of many disturbances. The mid-tropospheric ridge was unusually narrow and led to difficulties in forecasting straight-running storms. Additionally, the tropical upper tropospheric trough (TUTT) had a major role in the development of many systems, most notably Typhoon Gordon which formed from a single thunderstorm underneath a TUTT cell.

The season began with the unusual development of Tropical Storm Winona east of the International Date Line in early January. Remaining active for two weeks, the system crossed the basin before dissipating over the Philippines. Following a three-month lull in activity, a powerful typhoon developed in mid-April and was the second system in nine years to become a super typhoon during that month. By mid-May, an extensive monsoon trough had become established from the Bay of Bengal eastward into the South China Sea. Typhoon Brenda developed from this trough over the South China Sea and moved inland over southern China before dissipating. The typhoon left an area of enhanced low-level southerly flow in its wake that triggered the development of Typhoon Cecil at the end of the month. Two more storms developed during June – Typhoon Dot and Tropical Storm Ellis. The first was a strong typhoon that developed near the Caroline Islands and moved westward, eventually dissipating over Vietnam. The second was a poorly organized system that moved generally northward and struck Japan.

In early July, a surge in the monsoon trough over the basin resulted in the development of Tropical Storm Faye. While this system was over the Philippines, Typhoon Gordon developed underneath a TUTT cell to the east. Following Gordon's rapid intensification phase, a new tropical storm developed within an area of enhanced divergence associated with the same TUTT cell. Several days later, the monsoon trough became exceptionally active and spawned several consecutive cyclones in late-July: Irving over the South China Sea, Judy near the Mariana Islands, 12W near Taiwan, and Ken–Lola around the Ryukyu Islands. The development of seven tropical cyclones in July made it the most active July since 1973. The extreme activity continued into August with the formations of Mac, Nancy, Owen, Peggy, and 19W, all of which formed within the monsoon trough. The rapid succession of Nancy, Owen, and Peggy led to several days of binary interaction between the systems well to the south of Japan. Tropical Storm Roger developed near the Ryukyu Islands a few days after 19W dissipated and rapidly tracked northeastward through Japan. This was the only storm of the month not to develop within the monsoon trough. The final system of August, 21W, developed to the northeast of Guam and dissipated due to strong wind shear.

Heavy rains alongside several typhoons between June and September resulted in deadly flooding across parts of Anhui, Hebei, Hubei, Jiangsu, Jiangxi, Jilin, Sichuan, and Zhejiang provinces in China. The floods killed approximately 3,000 people and overall losses reached $2.7 billion.

== Systems ==
=== Tropical Storm Winona ===
- Tropical storm (JMA)
- Tropical storm (SSHWS)
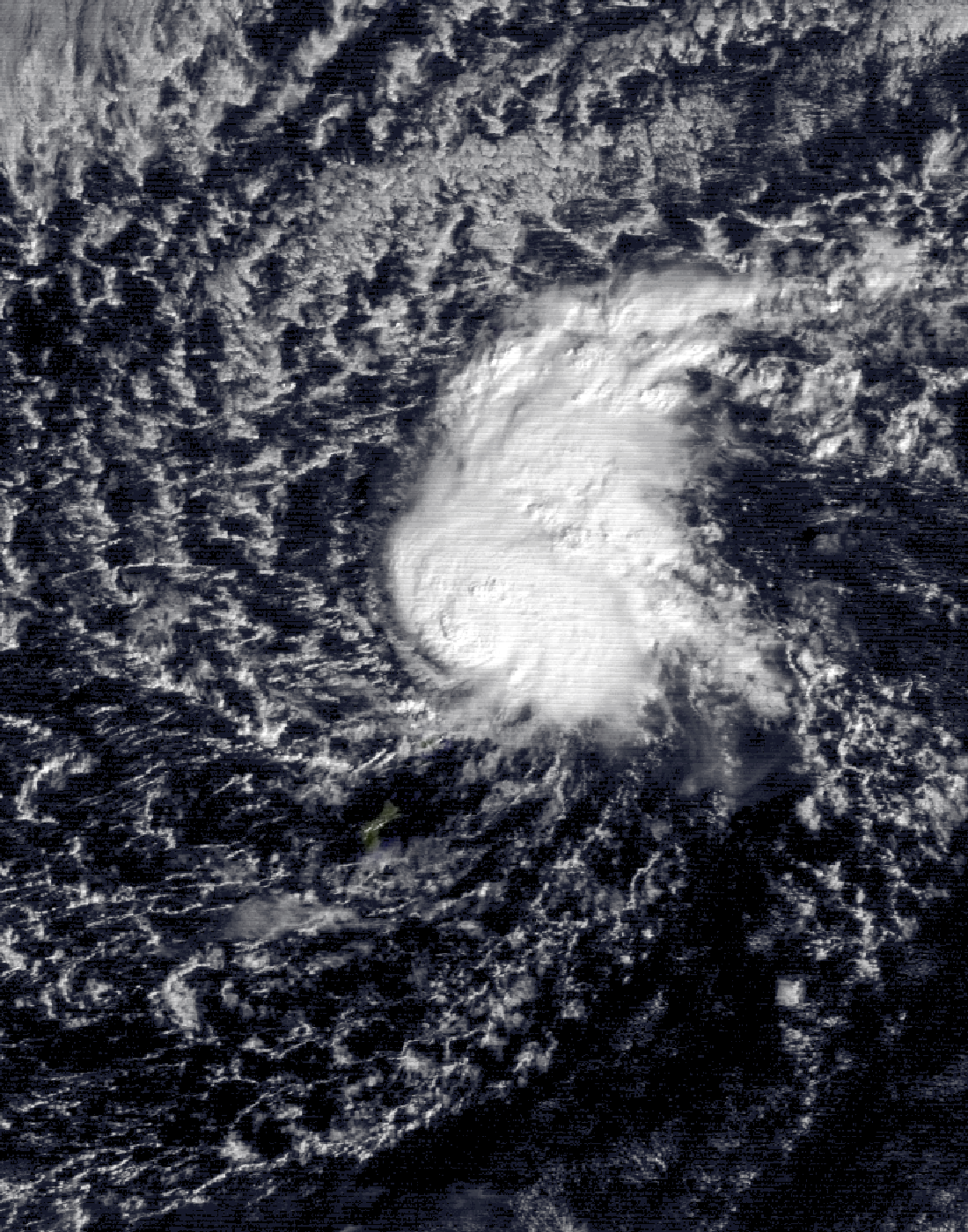
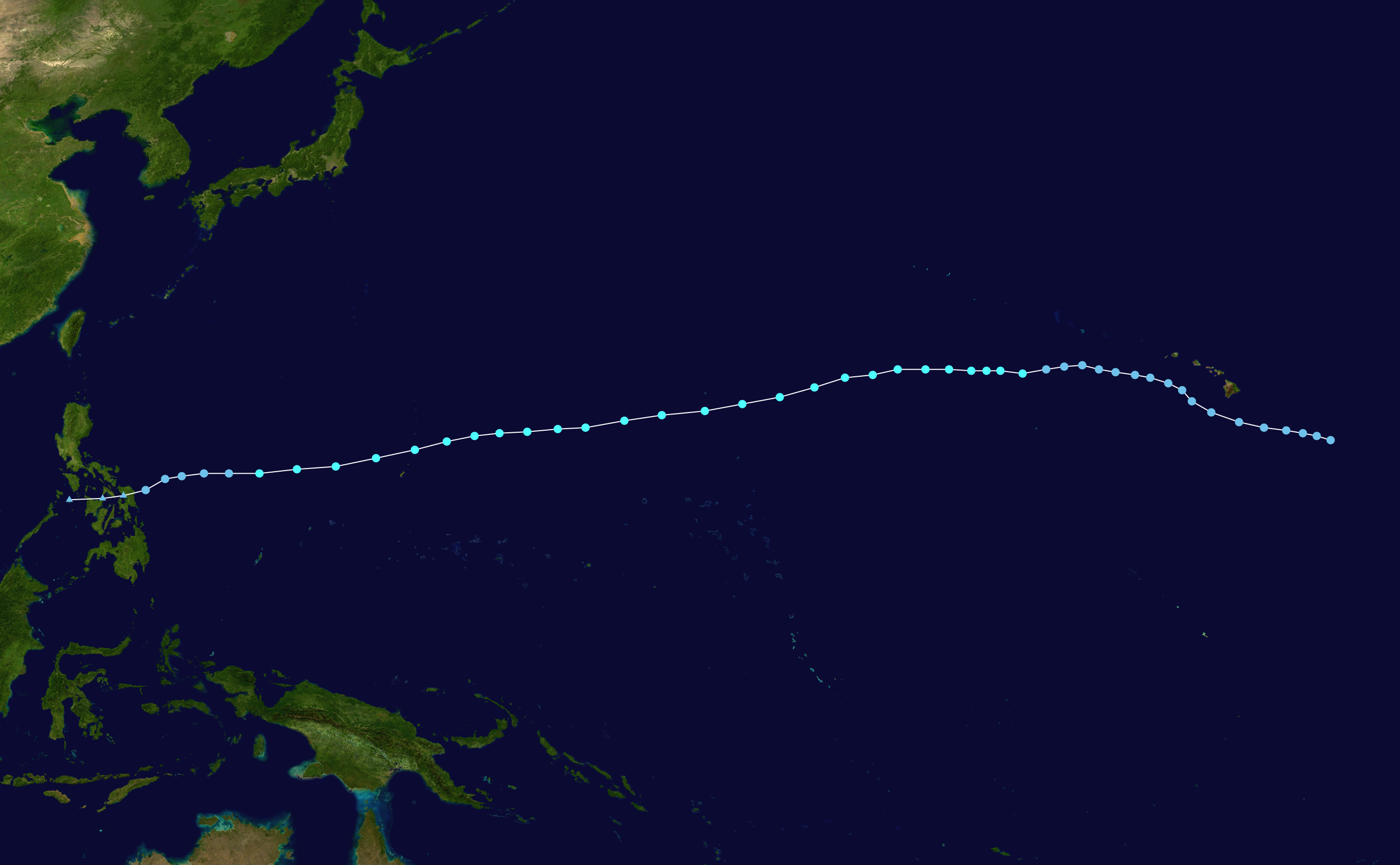
- Duration: January 15 (Entered basin) – January 21
- Peak intensity: 65 km/h (40 mph) (10-min); 1000 hPa (mbar)

On January 15, Tropical Storm Winona crossed the International Date Line and entered the Western Pacific basin. Embedded within broad easterly flow, the storm turned west-southwestward, a heading it would retain until dissipation, and accelerated. This acceleration caused slight strengthening of the storm by enhancing winds on the north side of the low.

On January 16, Winona passed approximately 140 km (87 mi) south of Wake Island. Operationally, it was not until January 18 that the JTWC began issuing warnings on the system. At the same time, the JMA assessed Winona to have been a weak tropical storm with winds of 65 km/h (40 mph). Around 0700 UTC on January 18, the ship MV Williams passed close to or through the center of Winona and measured a pressure of 991 mbar (991 hPa; 29.3 inHg) alongside 85 km/h (55 mph) sustained winds with gusts up to 130 km/h (80 mph). This was the only direct measurement in relation to the cyclone. Early on January 19, the JTWC assessed Winona to have reached its peak intensity with 100 km/h (60 mph) winds as it passed just north of Saipan. Later that day, convection quickly diminished as Winona moved into a shallow air mass-produced by polar system to the north. The system maintained only intermittent convection for another day before making landfall in the central Philippines. The storm quickly weakened and dissipated on January 22 as it emerged into the South China Sea.

Before dissipating, the remnants of Winona tracked through the Philippines; however, no known impact resulted from its passage. Throughout its nearly two week existence, Winona traveled approximately 10,185 km (6,329 mi) across the Pacific Ocean.

=== Tropical Depression Atring ===
- Tropical depression (PAGASA)
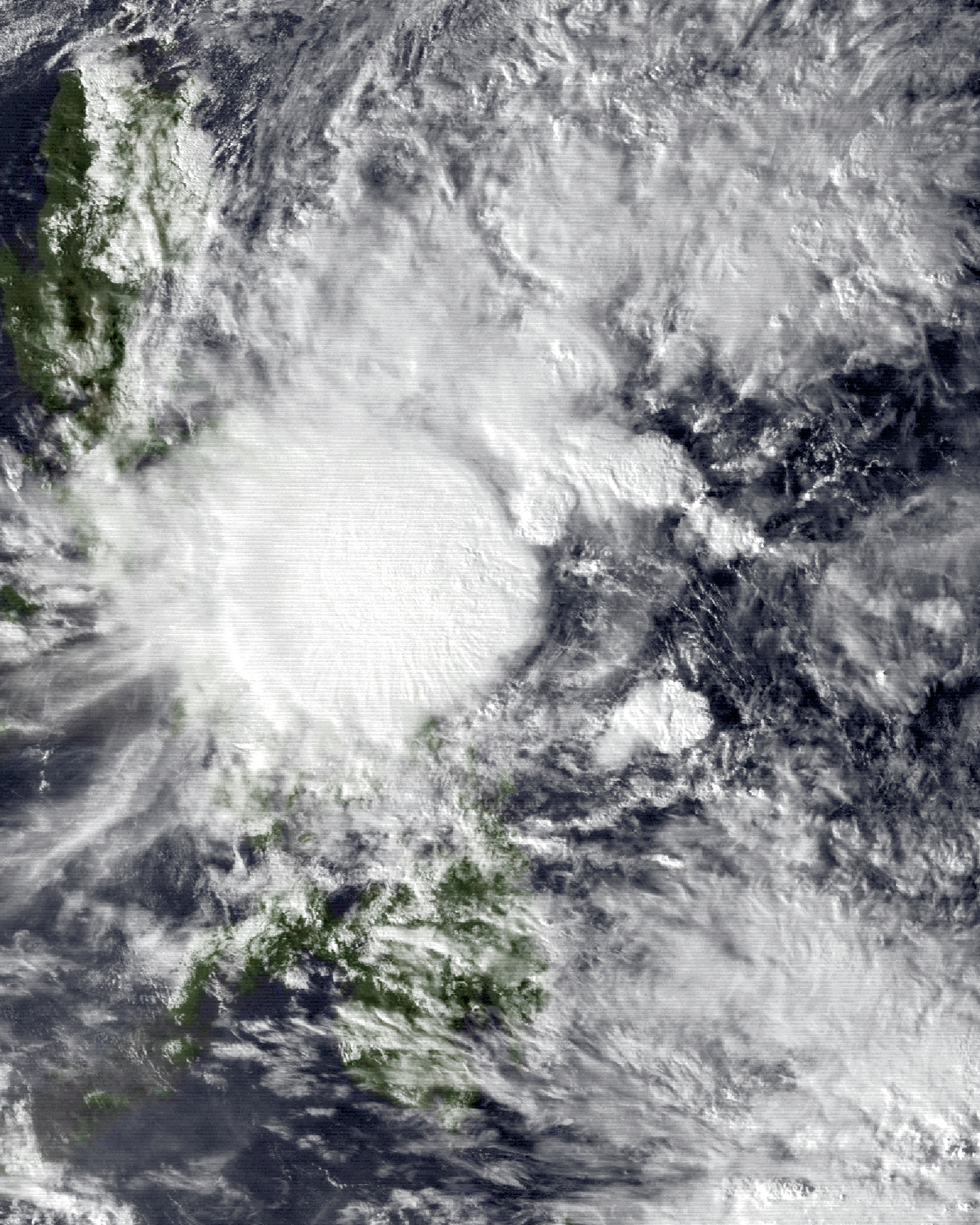
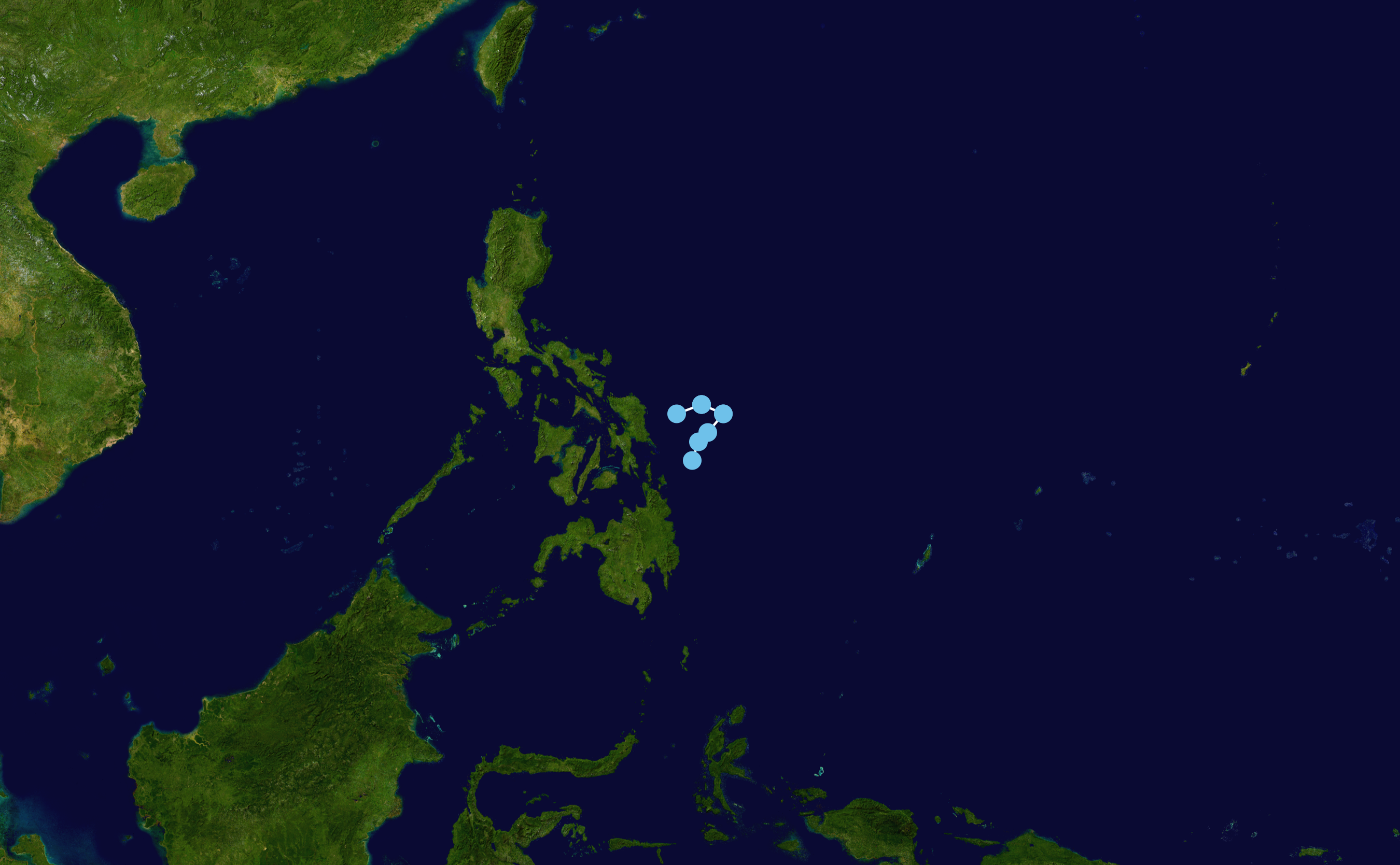
- Duration: January 26 – January 28
- Peak intensity: Winds not specified; 1006 hPa (mbar)

In late January, heavy rains affected much of Samar Island, resulting in widespread flooding. In some areas, flood waters reached depths of 1.2 m (3.9 ft). At least 35 people died as a result of the floods and agricultural losses were estimated at $5 million. The flooding was soon worsened as several days of monsoonal rains followed in early February. By February 7, at least 61 people had been killed and many more were reported missing.

=== Typhoon Andy ===
- Very strong typhoon (JMA)
- Category 5 super typhoon (SSHWS)
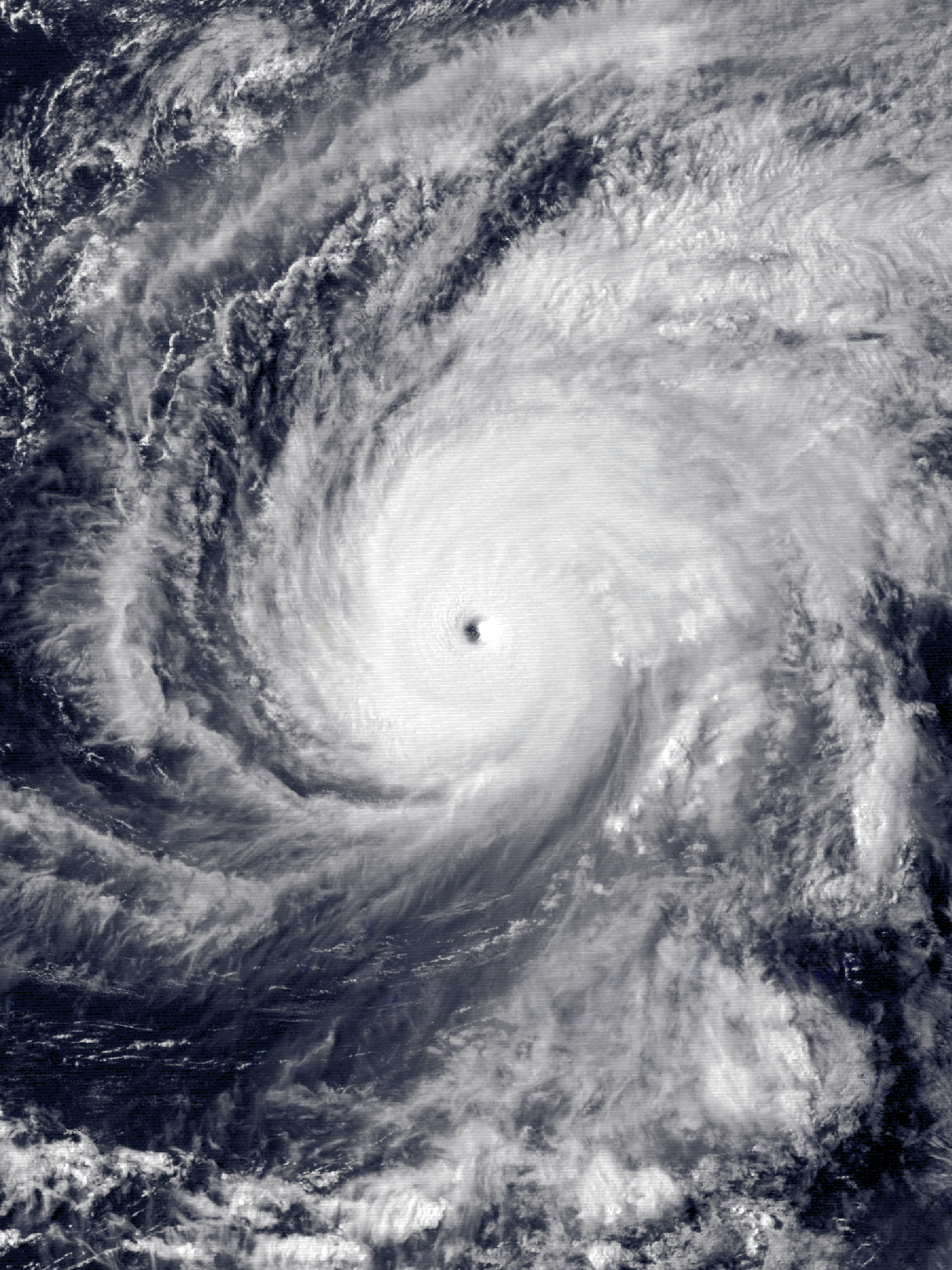
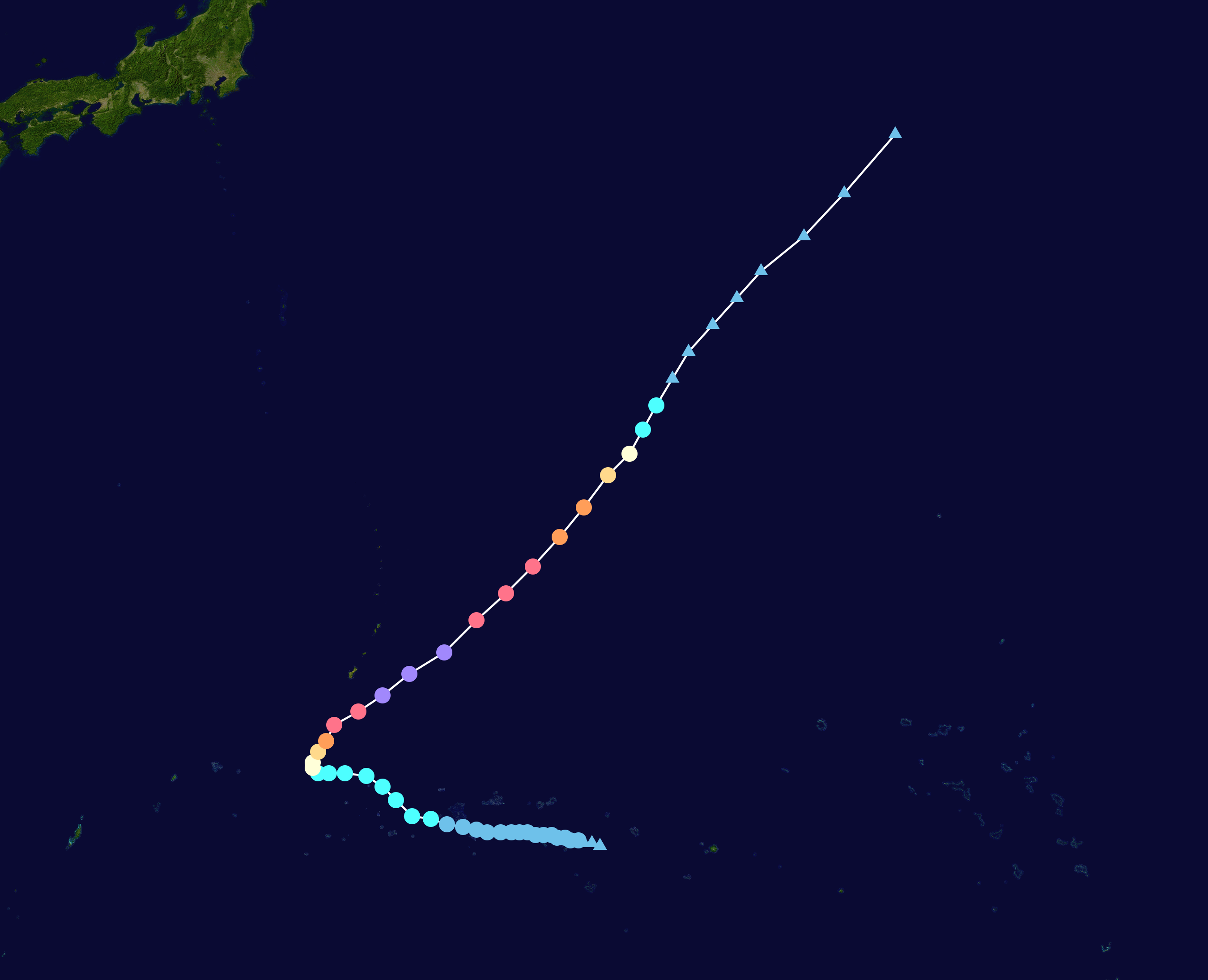
- Duration: April 17 – April 24
- Peak intensity: 185 km/h (115 mph) (10-min); 915 hPa (mbar)

Thunderstorm activity increased in coverage near Truk/Chuuk in the Caroline Islands on April 13. The system slowly developed, organizing into a tropical depression on April 18 while moving slowly to the west. On April 19, Andy began to move northward while continuing to intensify. The intense cyclone missed Guam by 130 kilometres (81 mi) to the southeast, with winds peaking at 68 knots (126 km/h) on Guam. Thereafter, Andy recurved to the northeast and steadily weakened due to increased vertical wind shear out of the west, dissipating as a tropical cyclone on April 24. Andy became the second typhoon to form in April in nine years.

Prior to Typhoon Andy's arrival, 14 B-52s and 3 KC-135s were relocated from Anderson Air Force Base in Guam to Hickam Air Force Base in Hawaii, while one KC-135 was sent to Clark Air Base in the Philippines. Nearly half of the schools in Guam were converted to public shelters. Approximately 1,100 people sought refuge across the island. On April 21, the typhoon's close passage brought sustained winds of 130 km/h (80 mph) and gusts up to 155 km/h (95 mph) to Guam. The storm's high winds downed many power lines, leaving about 15 percent of Guam without power for several hours. Overall damage from the storm was minimal despite the strong winds and no reports of major structural damage or injuries were received. Heavy rain also impact much of the southern Mariana Islands, amounting to about 130 mm (5.1 in) in Guam. These heavy rains caused pump malfunctions that left many residents without drinkable water.

=== Typhoon Brenda (Bining) ===
- Typhoon (JMA)
- Category 1 typhoon (SSHWS)
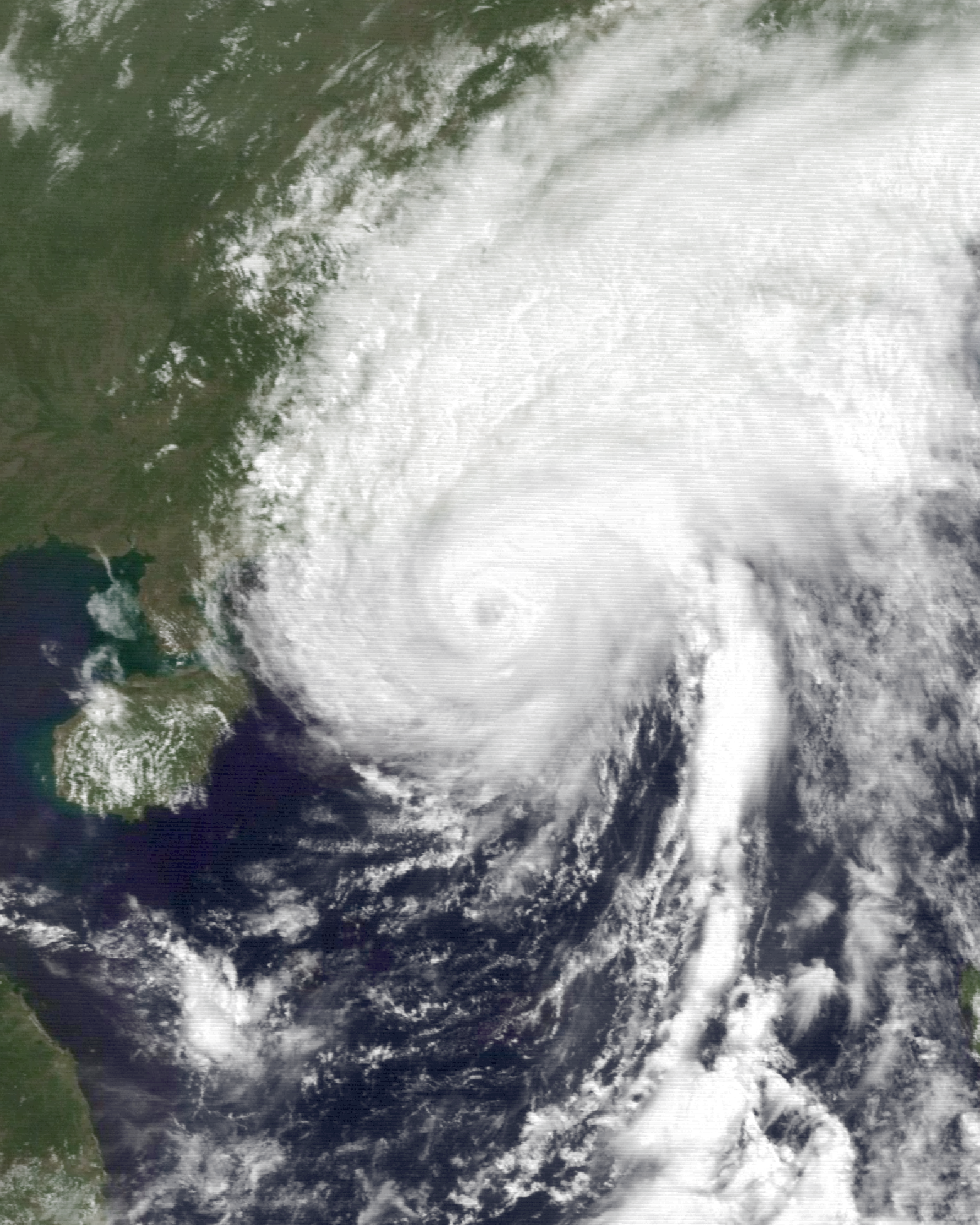
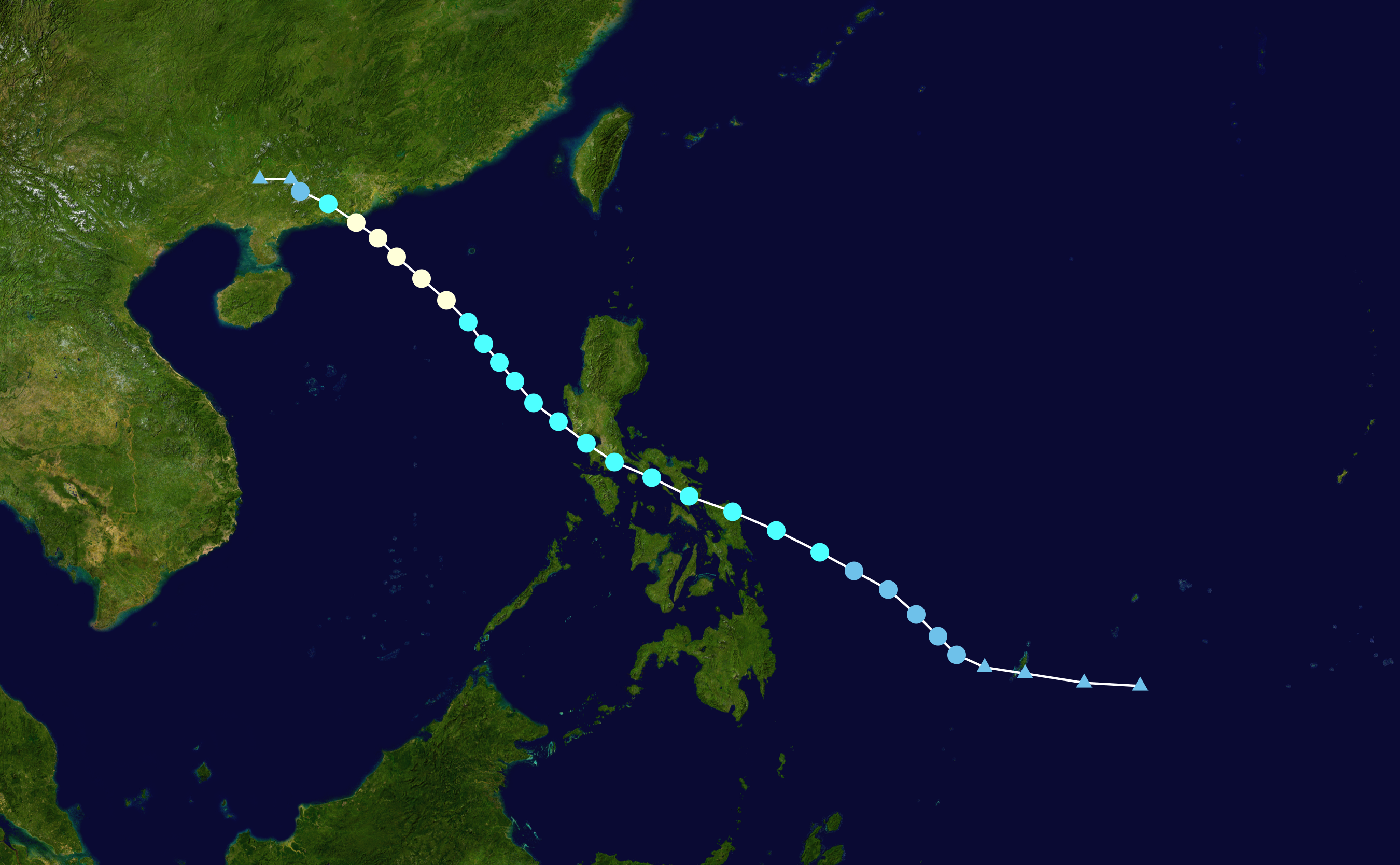
- Duration: May 14 – May 21
- Peak intensity: 120 km/h (75 mph) (10-min); 970 hPa (mbar)

A tropical depression which formed in the monsoon trough on May 14 became a tropical storm on May 16 and struck Samar Island and southern Luzon in the Philippines that day. At least four ships sank and 50 people were killed in the Philippines. Brenda became a typhoon and reached a peak of 85 mph (137 km/h) winds before hitting southern China on May 20. The storm brought torrential flooding, resulting in at least 84 casualties and widespread damage in China. In Hong Kong six people were killed and one was missing due to landslides and flooding.

On May 16, storm warnings were issued for 20 provinces across the Philippines as Brenda approached the country. Multiple commercial vessels were kept at port until the storm passed. Throughout the country, Brenda killed at least 18 people and left 6,000 more homeless. Additionally, 52 people were reported missing.

=== Severe Tropical Storm Cecil ===
- Severe tropical storm (JMA)
- Category 1 typhoon (SSHWS)
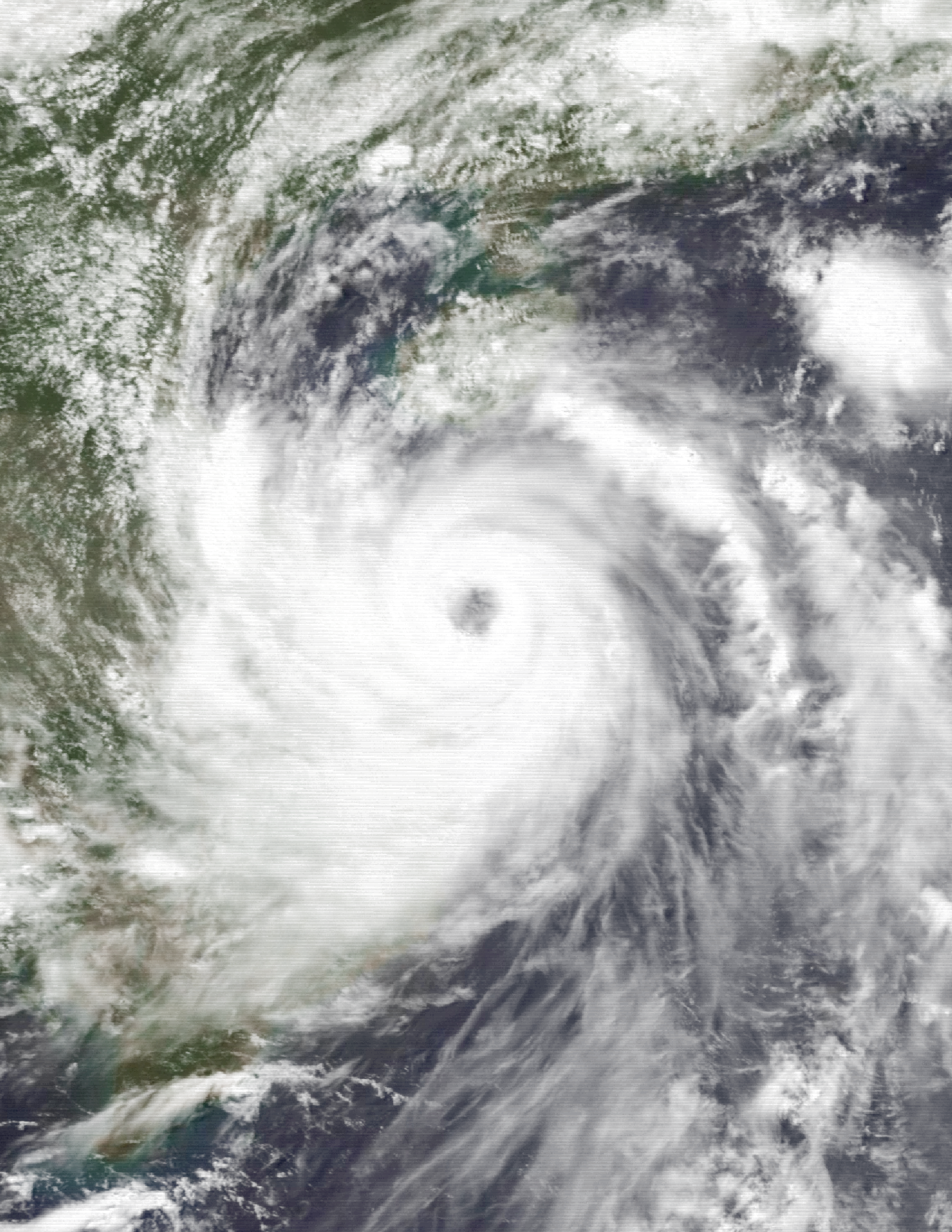
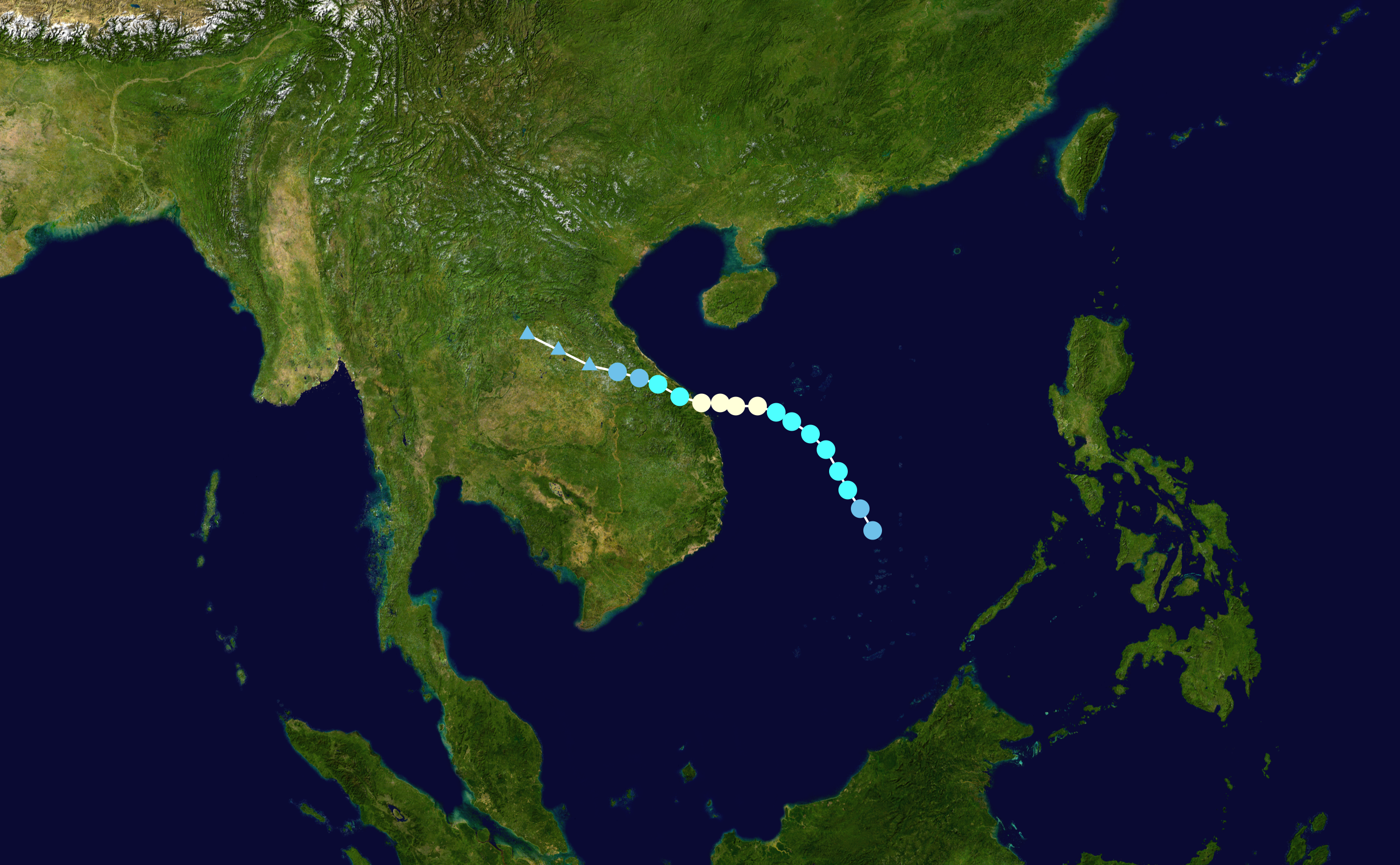
- Duration: May 22 – May 26
- Peak intensity: 110 km/h (70 mph) (10-min); 975 hPa (mbar)

Cecil originated as a tropical depression over the South China Sea on May 22. Tracking north-northwestward, the system steadily intensified, attaining peak winds of 110 km/h (70 mph). The JTWC assessed Cecil to have been slightly stronger with one-minute sustained winds of 140 km/h (85 mph). The storm made landfall near Hội An late on May 24 and quickly weakened. The lowest atmospheric pressure recorded on May 25, observed in Da Nang at an elevation of 6 meters above sea level, was 982.1 hPa. The system later dissipated over Laos on May 26. In Vietnam, heavy rains accompanying the storm, amounting to over 510 mm (20 in) in some areas, triggered catastrophic flooding that killed 751 people. Widespread structural and agricultural losses took place in addition to the significant loss of life, with damage estimated at ₫300 billion ($71.7 million). In the wake of the flooding, some international aid was sent to Vietnam, though most relief work was conducted by the government, local agencies, and the Red Cross.

=== Typhoon Dot (Kuring) ===
- Typhoon (JMA)
- Category 3 typhoon (SSHWS)
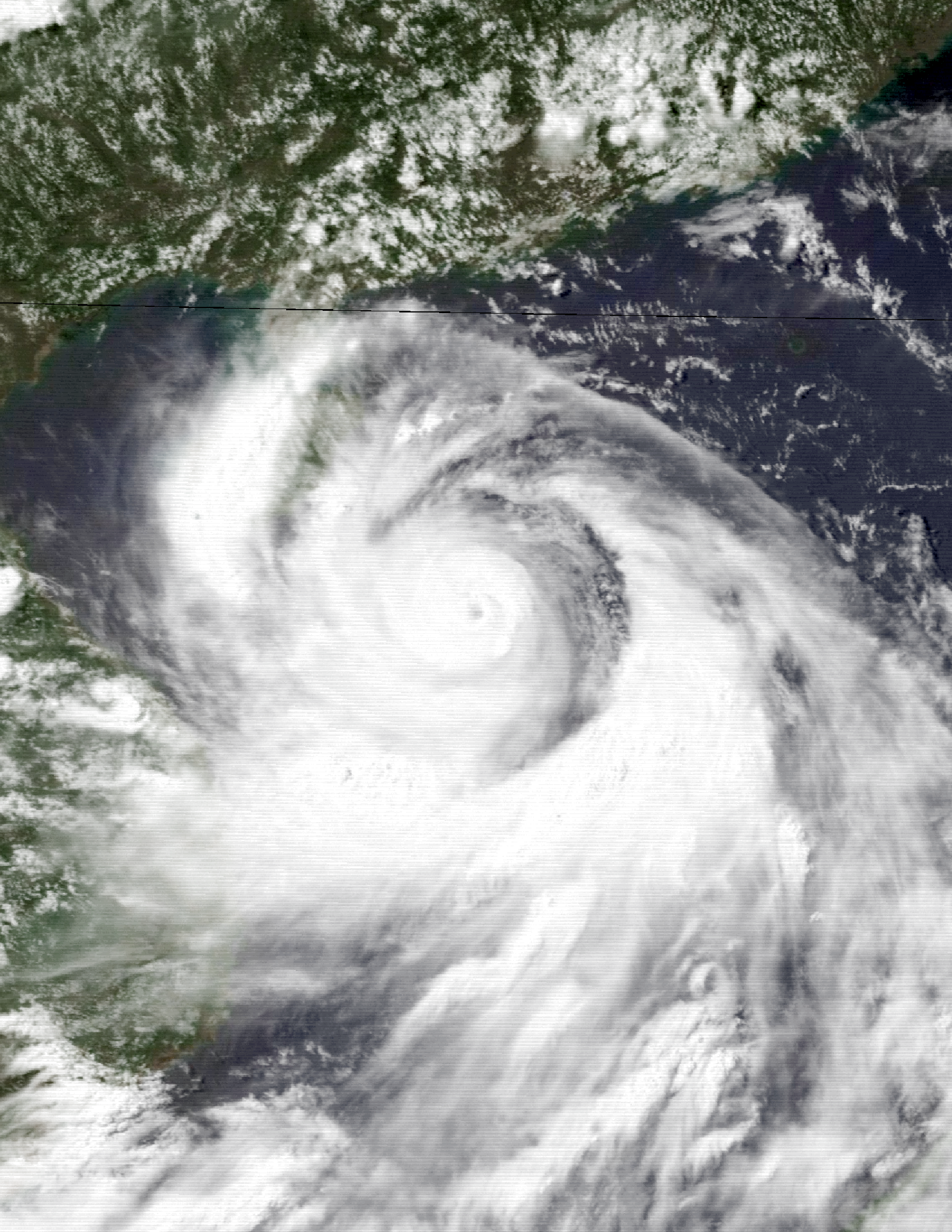
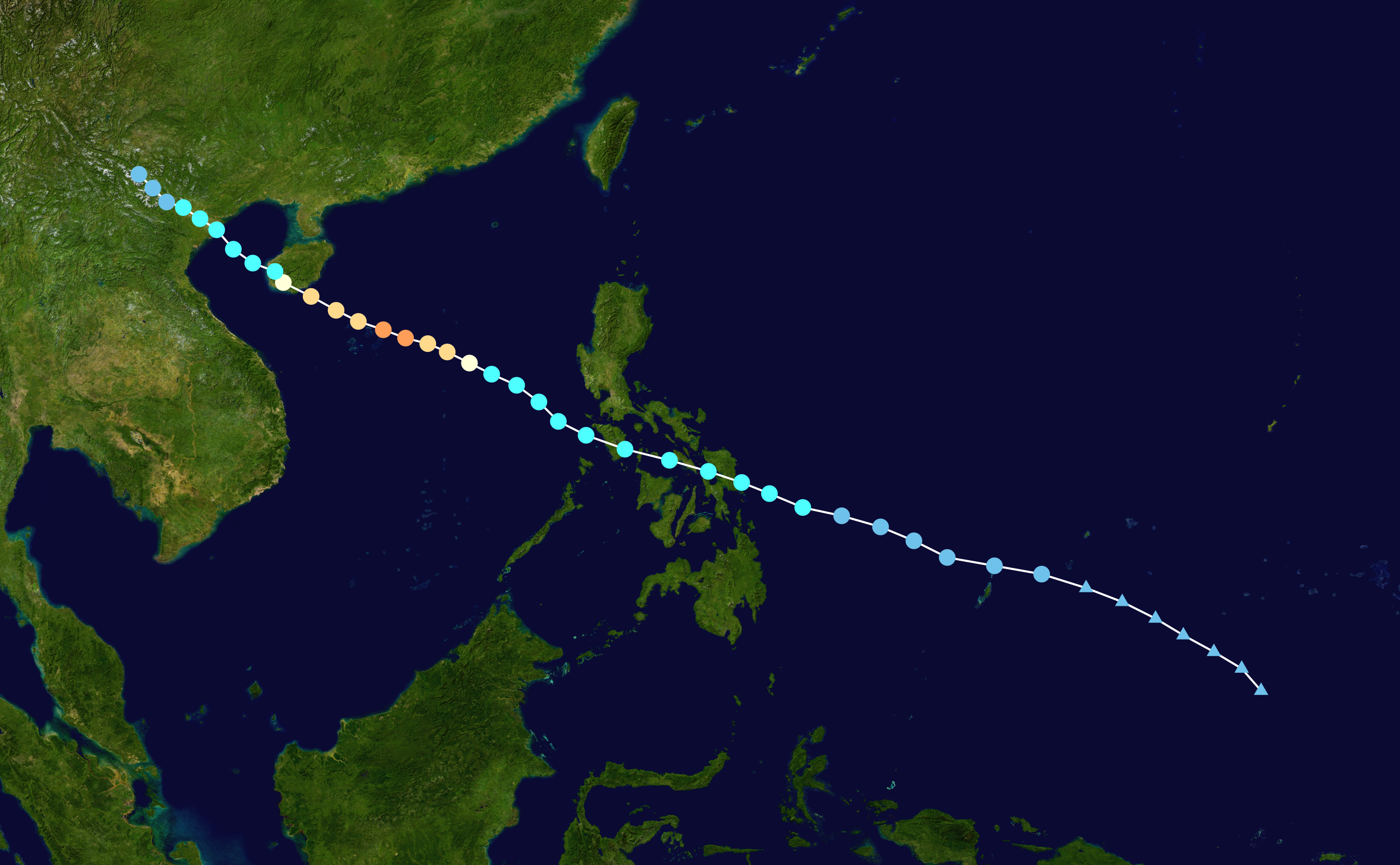
- Duration: June 4 – June 12
- Peak intensity: 150 km/h (90 mph) (10-min); 955 hPa (mbar)

Originating from a tropical disturbance near Palau on June 4, Dot tracked west-northwestward towards the Philippines. Crossing the country on June 6, the system moved over the South China Sea and attained typhoon status. Late on June 8, Dot reached its peak intensity with winds estimated at 185 km/h (115 mph). The system weakened slightly the next day before making landfall in Hainan Island. A weakened storm then entered the Gulf of Tonkin before striking northern Vietnam and dissipating on June 12.

Throughout its course, Typhoon Dot produced heavy rains in the Philippines, China and Vietnam, resulting in significant damage and eight fatalities. The most severe impacts took place on Hainan Island where 1,400 homes were destroyed and another 60,000 were damaged. In Vietnam, Dot killed six people and exacerbated flooding triggered in late May by Tropical Storm Cecil.

=== Severe Tropical Storm Ellis (Daling) ===
- Severe tropical storm (JMA)
- Tropical storm (SSHWS)
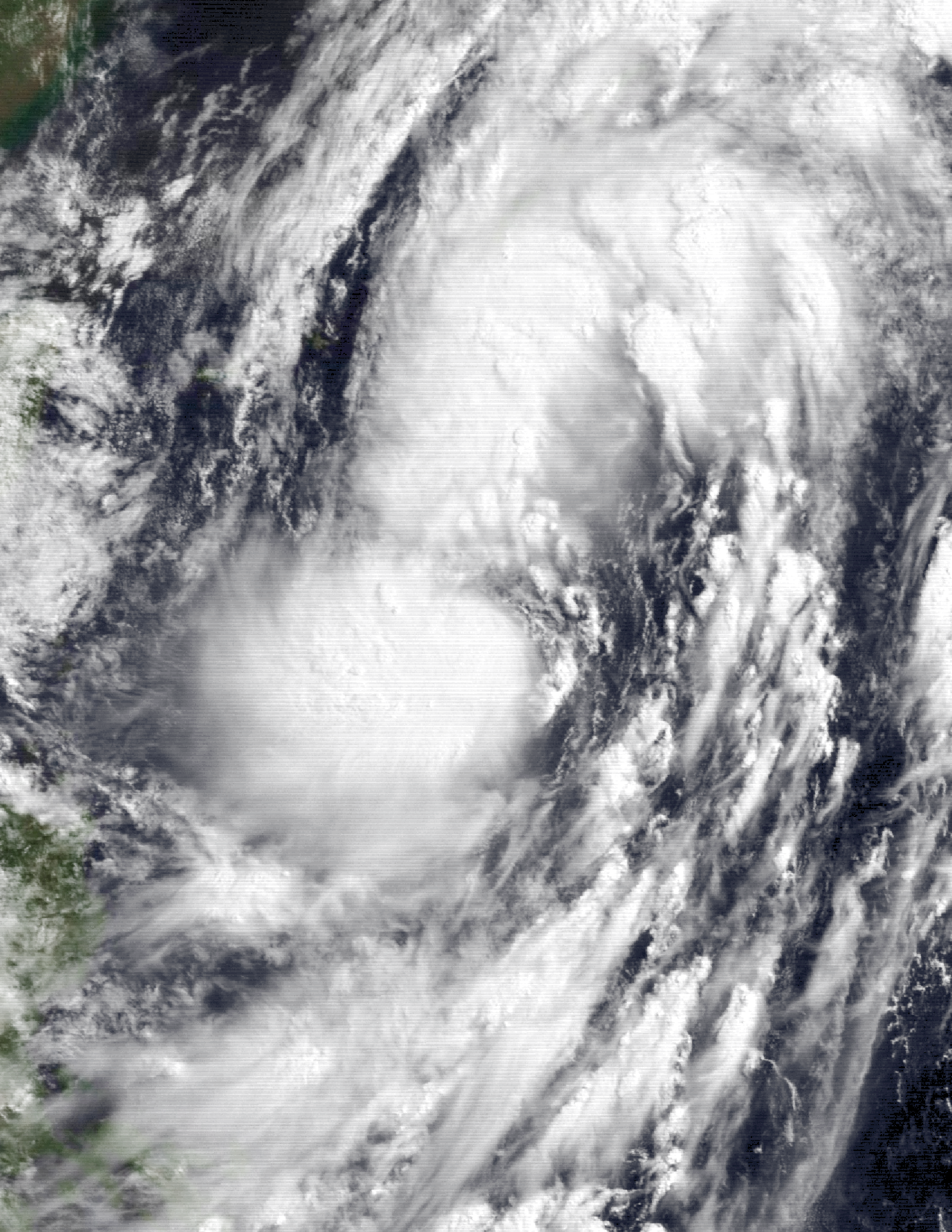
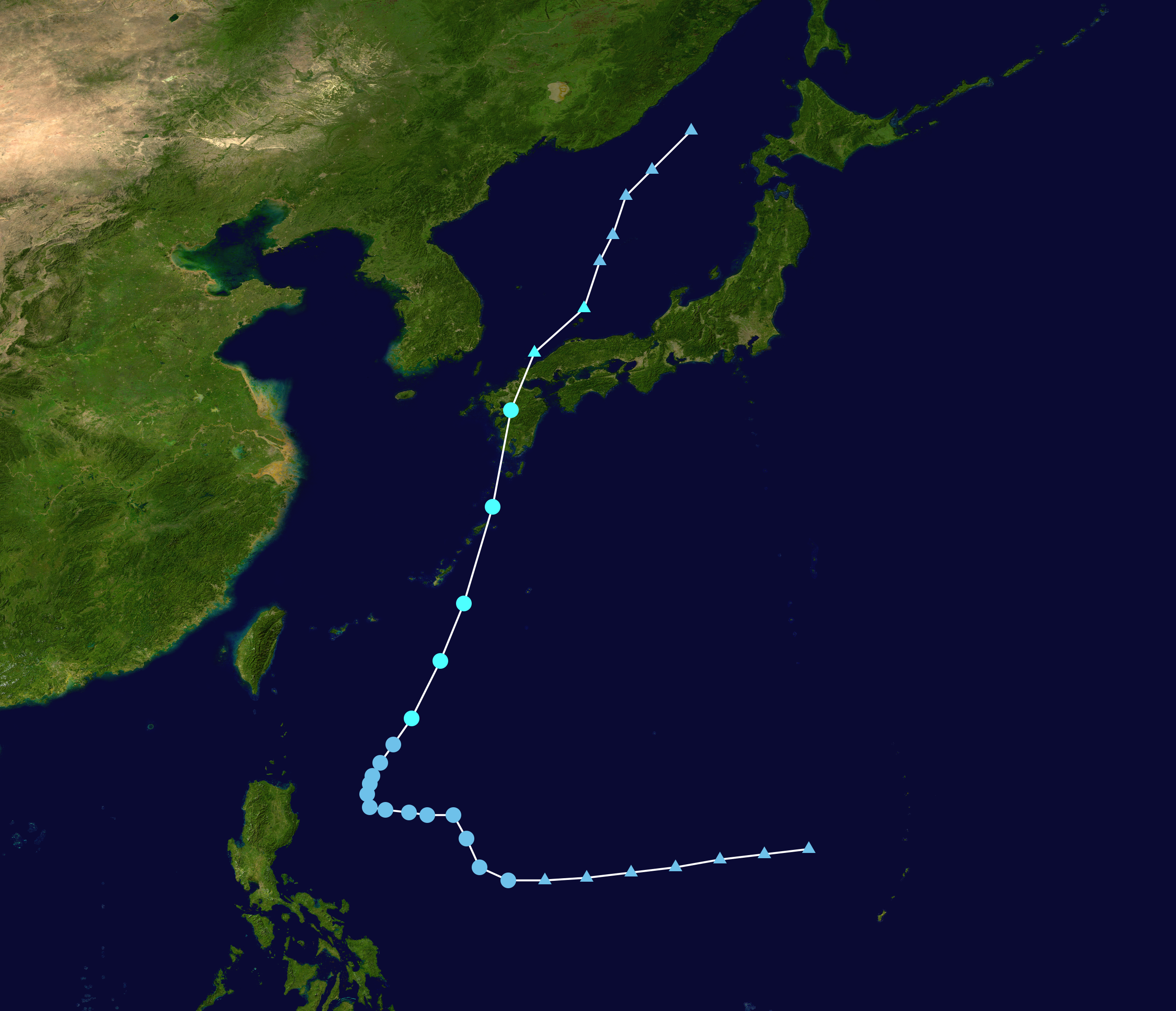
- Duration: June 18 – June 24
- Peak intensity: 95 km/h (60 mph) (10-min); 985 hPa (mbar)

Developing as a disturbance in the Philippine Sea on June 18, the system moved westward initially and became a tropical depression late on June 20 and weakened on June 21. Early on June 23, the large system with gales well removed from its center became a tropical depression once more. A trough to its northwest had deepened, which was accelerating the cyclone northward. It became a minimal tropical storm during this acceleration. Late that day, it became a frontal wave before moving through Japan into the Sea of Japan.

Tropical Storm Ellis produced rain over much of Japan, with the heaviest falling around Tokyo where rainfall rates reached 53 mm (2.1 in) per hour. Between June 23 and 24, 343 mm (13.5 in) of rain fell in the city, much of which fell in a 24-hour span. Several areas also recorded tropical storm force winds.

=== Severe Tropical Storm Faye (Elang) ===
- Severe tropical storm (JMA)
- Tropical storm (SSHWS)
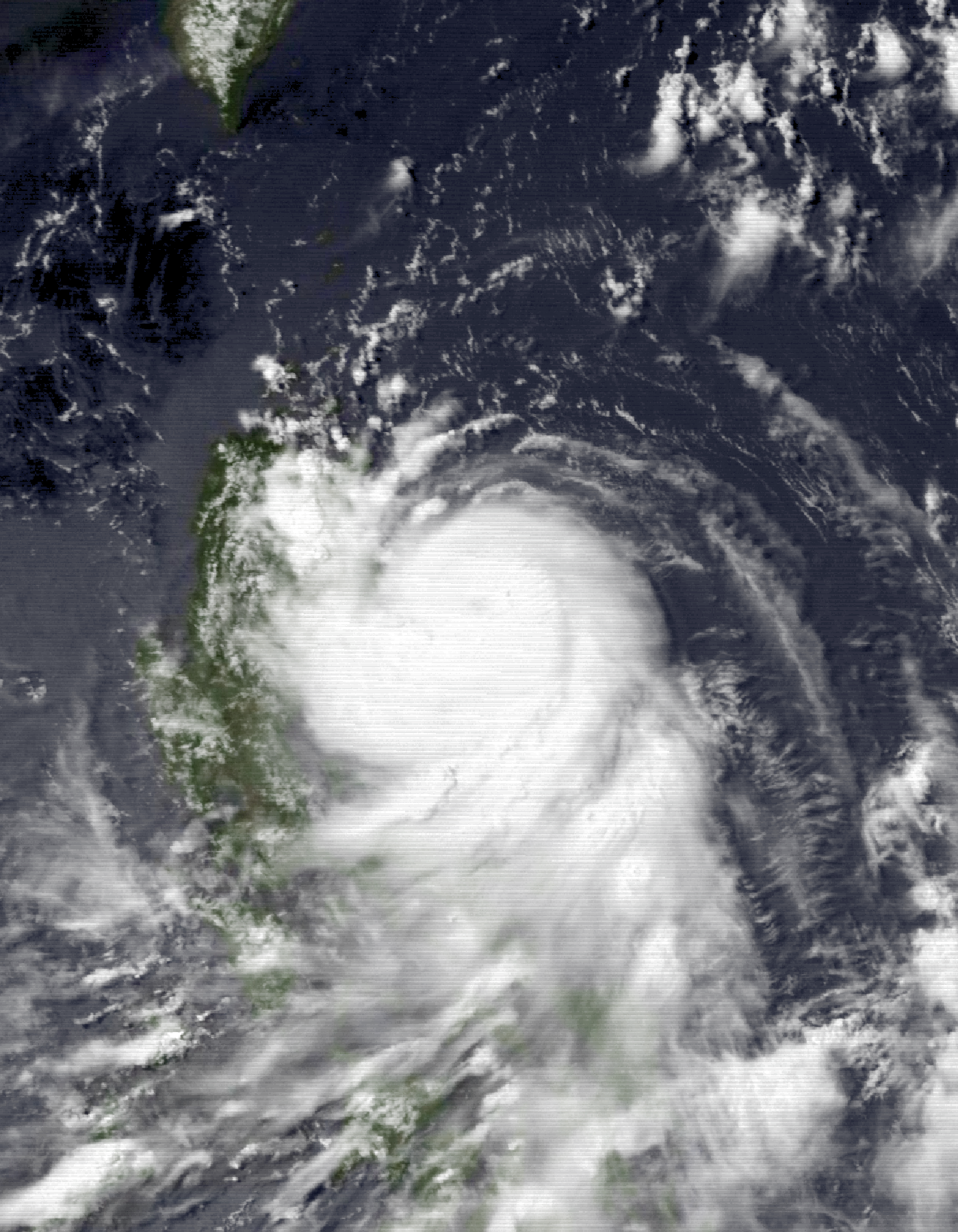
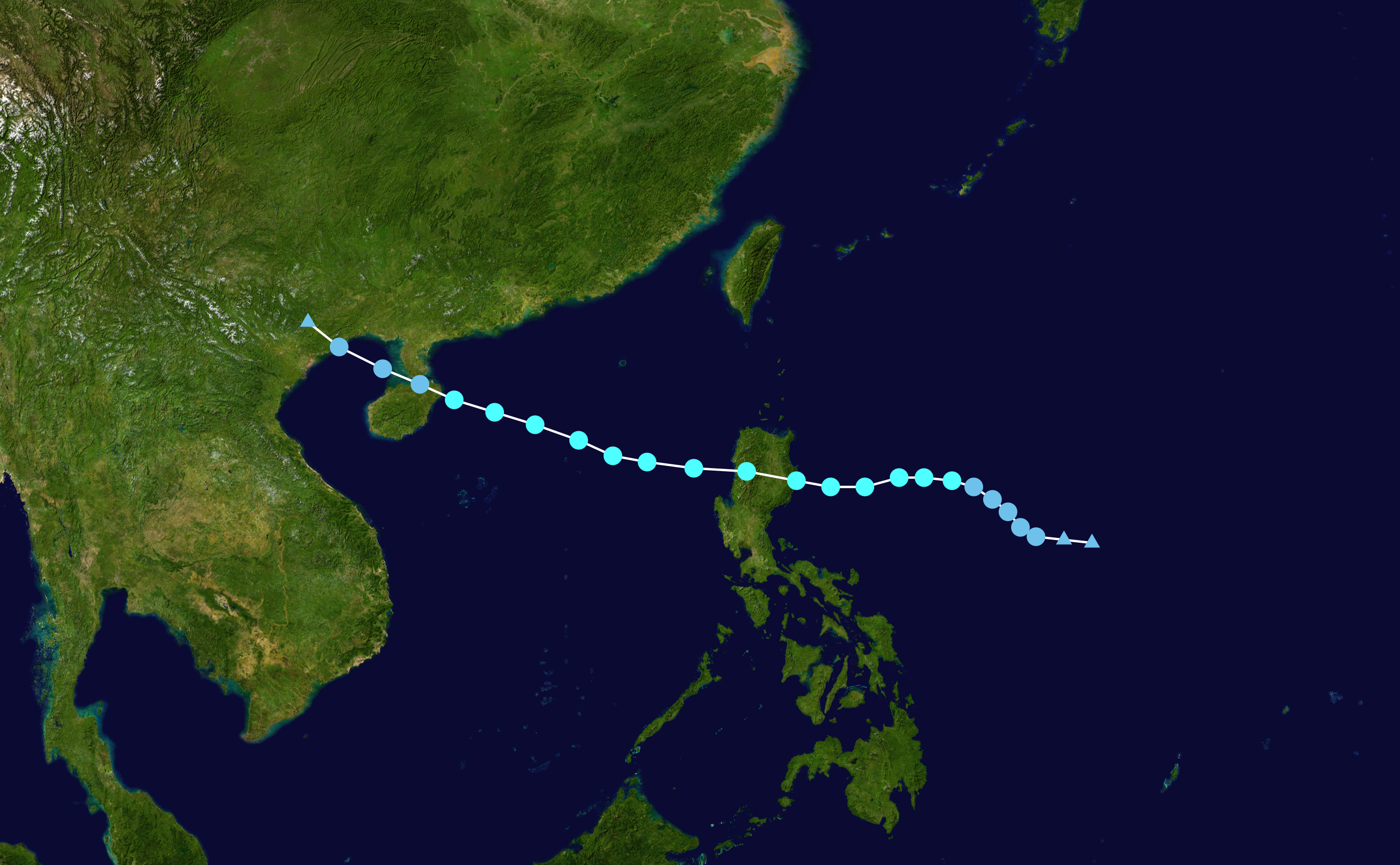
- Duration: July 6 – July 11
- Peak intensity: 100 km/h (65 mph) (10-min); 980 hPa (mbar)

On July 6 a tropical depression formed west of Luzon. Tracking generally westward, the system soon strengthened into Tropical Storm Faye. On July 8, the storm struck the Philippines as a severe tropical storm before moving into the South China Sea. Struggling to regain strength, the system subsequently made landfall in northern Hainan Island. After briefly emerging into the Gulf of Tonkin, Faye made its third and final landfall near Hai Phong, Vietnam on July 11. Once onshore, Faye rapidly dissipated.

=== Typhoon Gordon (Goring) ===
- Very strong typhoon (JMA)
- Category 5 super typhoon (SSHWS)
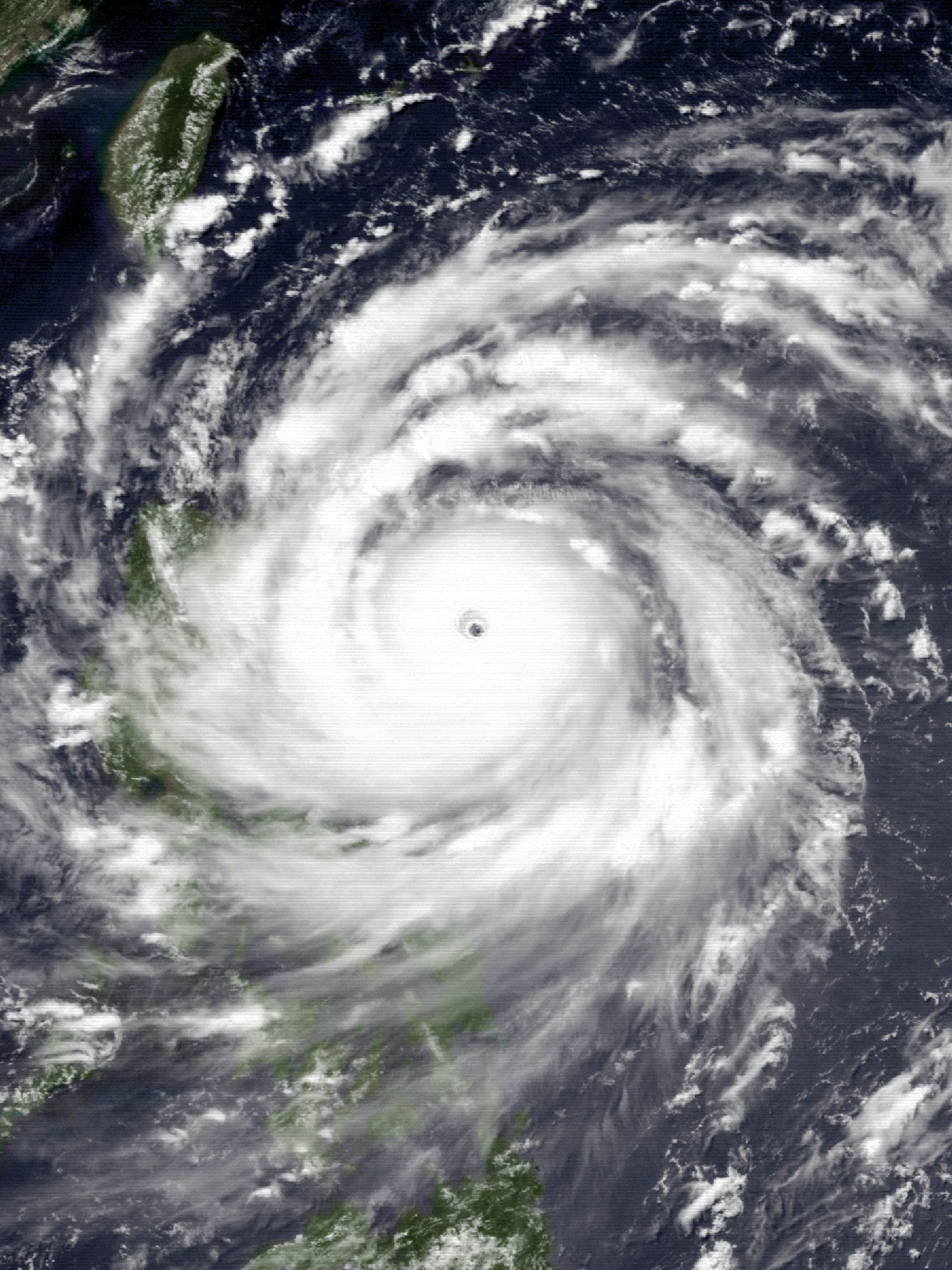
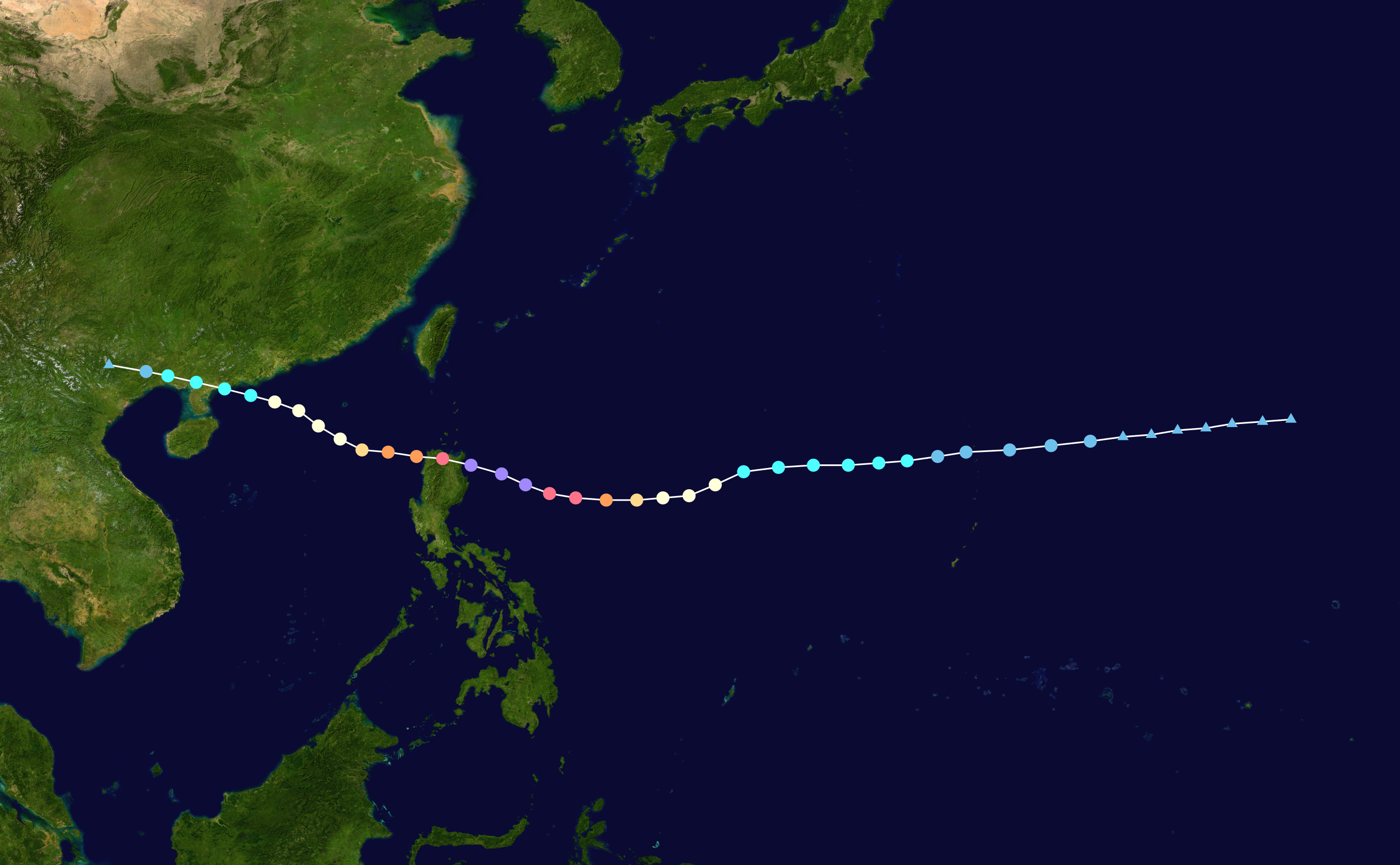
- Duration: July 9 – July 19
- Peak intensity: 185 km/h (115 mph) (10-min); 915 hPa (mbar)

Originating from a single cluster of thunderstorms on July 9, Gordon developed into a tropical depression near the Northern Mariana Islands and quickly intensified as it tracked west-southwestward. On July 13, the storm attained typhoon status and subsequently underwent a period of rapid intensification. By July 15, the storm attained its peak strength as a Category 5 equivalent super typhoon with winds estimated at 260 km/h (160 mph). After striking the northern Philippines, Gordon moved through the South China Sea and slowly weakened. On July 18, the storm made landfall in southern China and was last noted the following day as it dissipated over land.

Throughout Gordon's path from the Philippines to China, the storm caused widespread damage and loss of life. Across the Philippines, 90 people were killed by the typhoon and an estimated 120,000 people were left homeless. Though a weaker storm when it struck China, damage was more severe due to extensive flooding. Several coastal cities were completely inundated. Throughout the country, at least 200 people died and losses reached 1.2 billion yuan ($319 million USD). Additionally, 14 people drowned offshore and 2 others died in Hong Kong.

=== Tropical Storm Hope (Huling) ===
- Tropical storm (JMA)
- Tropical storm (SSHWS)
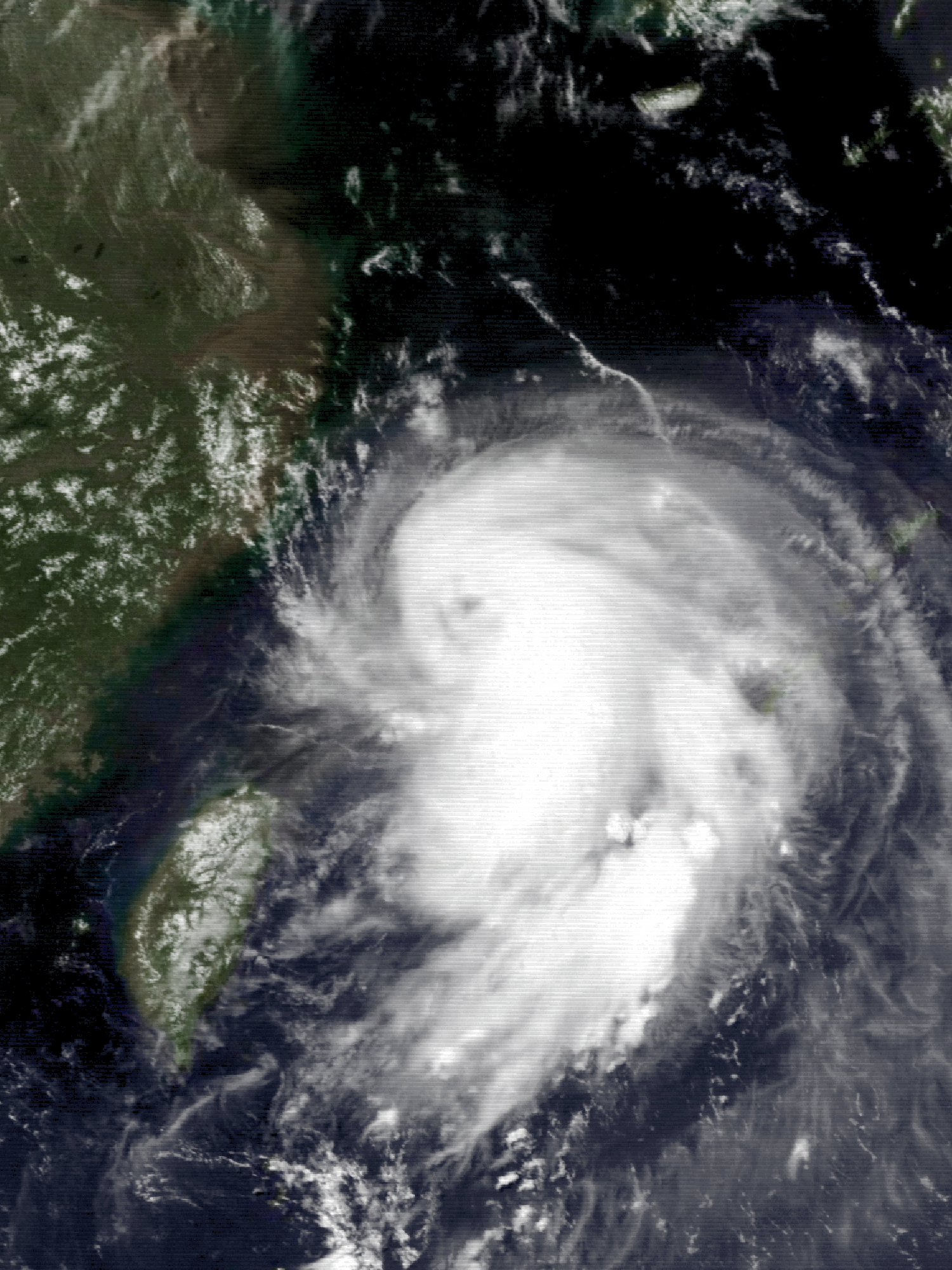
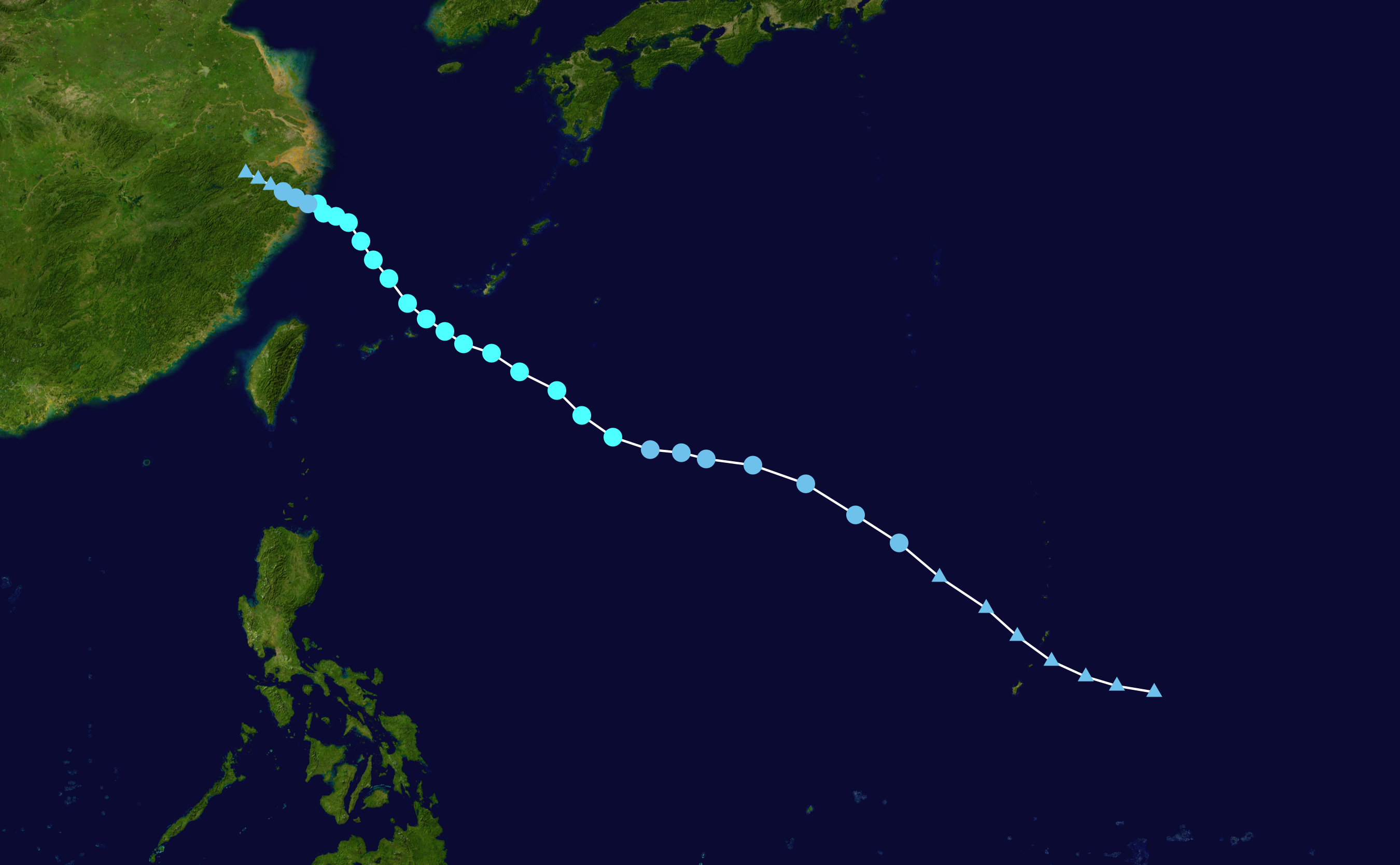
- Duration: July 16 – July 21
- Peak intensity: 85 km/h (50 mph) (10-min); 990 hPa (mbar)

A tropical depression formed in the wake of Super Typhoon Gordon on July 16. The depression moved towards the northwest and strengthened into Tropical Storm Hope. Hope moved approximately 100 miles (160 km) south of Okinawa and then strengthened to a peak of 65 mph (105 km/h) while nearing the China coastline. Due to its proximity to the Philippines, the Philippine Atmospheric, Geophysical and Astronomical Services Administration also monitored the storm and assigned it with the local name Huling. Hope made landfall on the east China coastline on July 21.

Following on the heels of Typhoon Gordon, Hope enhanced monsoonal rainfall over the Philippines, exacerbating ongoing floods and hampering relief efforts. Three fatalities took place after a landslide in Baguio destroyed a home. Although related to Tropical Storm Hope, the deaths were attributed to Typhoon Gordon.

Throughout Zhejiang and Fujian Provinces, Hope killed 198 people, injured more than 1,901 and left $340 million in damage. Additionally, 53 people were reported missing.

=== Severe Tropical Storm Irving (Ibiang) ===
- Severe tropical storm (JMA)
- Tropical storm (SSHWS)
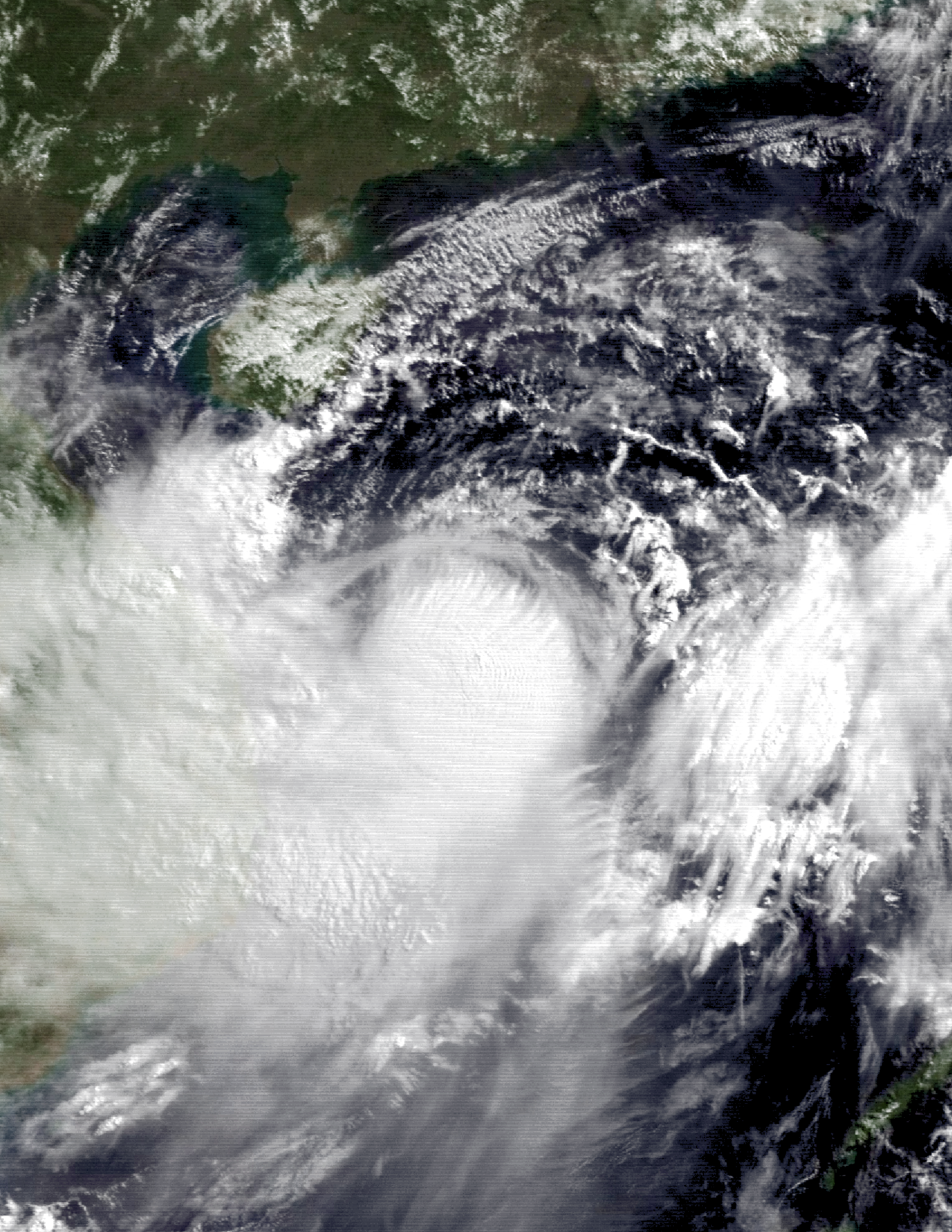
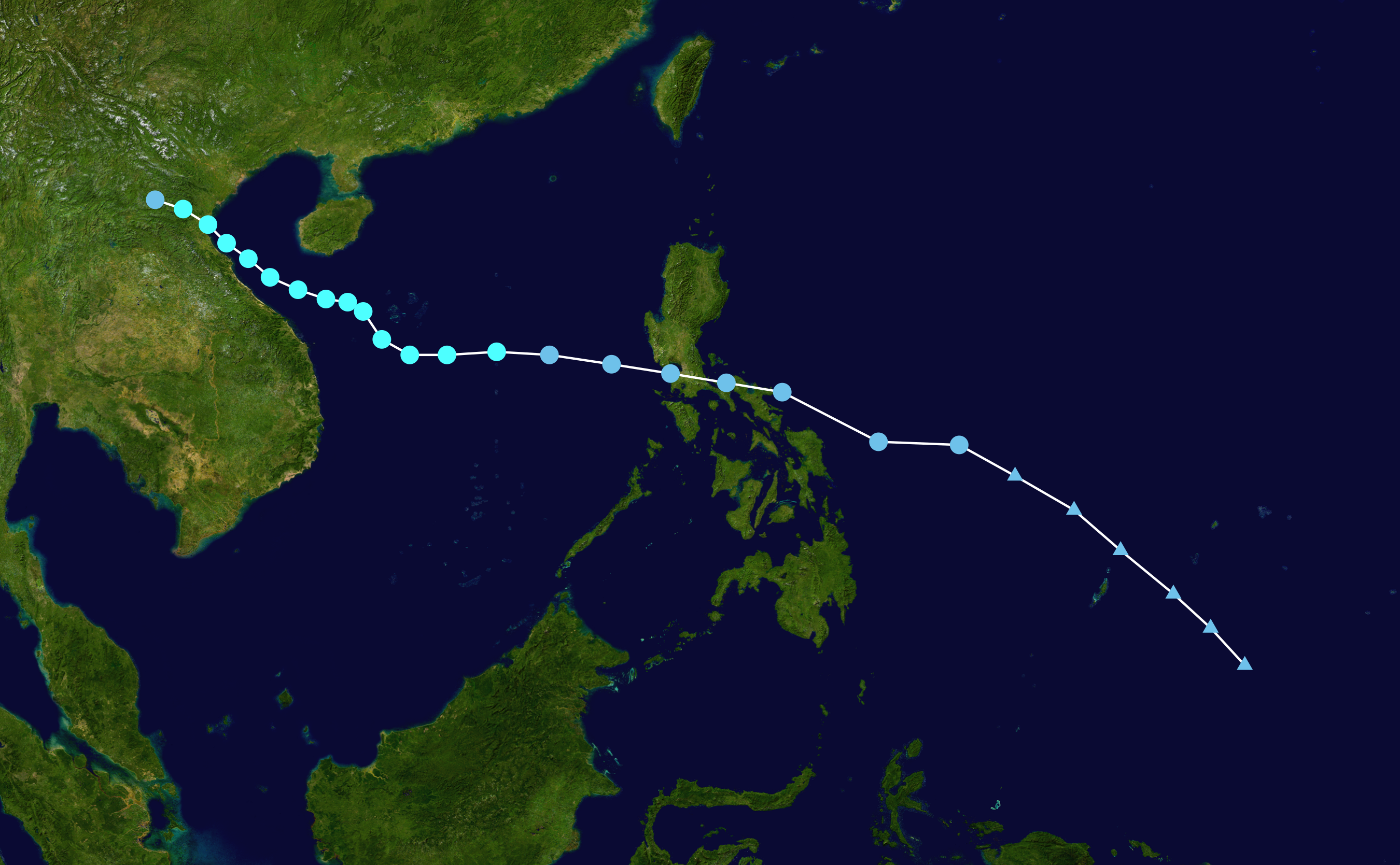
- Duration: July 18 – July 24
- Peak intensity: 100 km/h (65 mph) (10-min); 985 hPa (mbar)

Tropical Storm Irving formed in the South China Sea west of the Philippines on July 21. Although hampered by northerly sheer Irving intensified to a peak of 65 mph (105 km/h) just before landfall in northern Vietnam.

Striking Vietnam as a strong tropical storm, Irving brought widespread heavy rain that caused damaging floods. Parts of Tinh Gia District received up to 423 mm (16.7 in) of rain. At least 82,000 homes were destroyed and according to the Vietnamese Army newspaper, Quan Doi Nhan Dan, 10,273 classrooms were also damaged or destroyed by the floods. Agricultural losses were also significant with approximately 159,800 hectares (395,000 acres) of crops, including 56,800 hectares (140,000 acres) of rice and 7,900 hectares (20,000 acres) of other products, being inundated by flood waters. Throughout the country, 104 people were killed due to Tropical Storm Irving's passage.

=== Typhoon Judy ===
- Very strong typhoon (JMA)
- Category 2 typhoon (SSHWS)
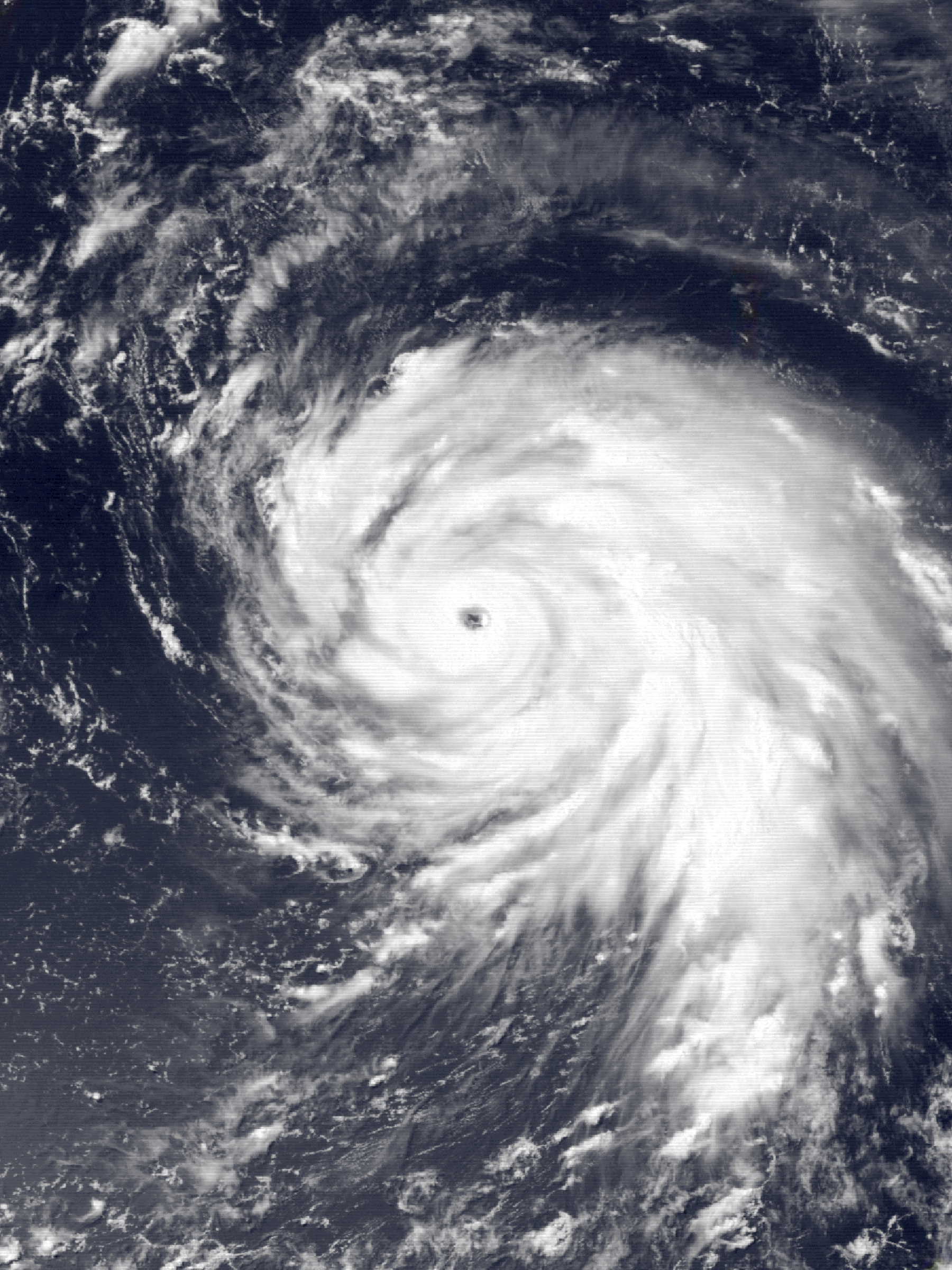
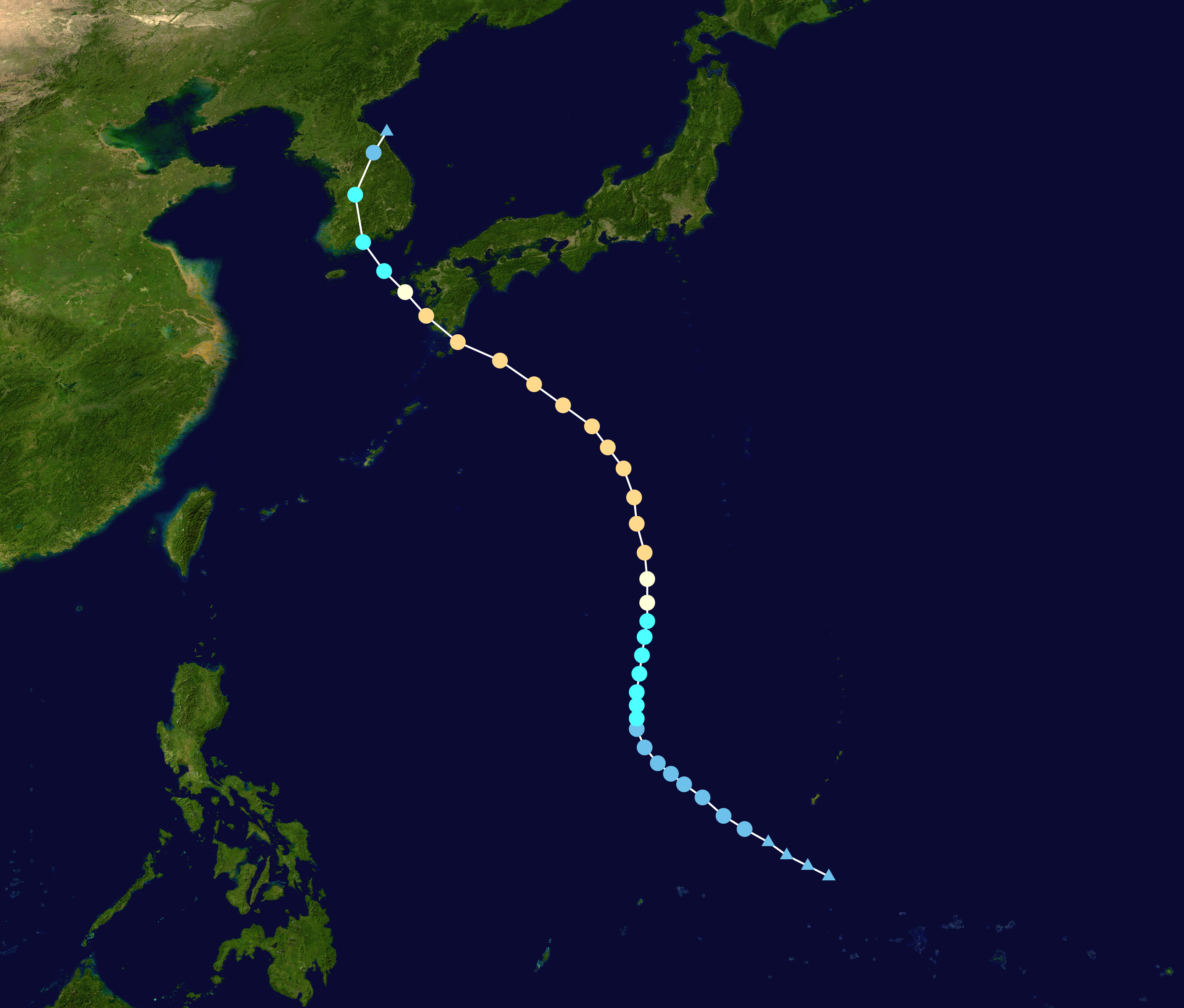
- Duration: July 20 – July 29
- Peak intensity: 155 km/h (100 mph) (10-min); 940 hPa (mbar)

Originating from a monsoon trough on July 21, Judy began as a tropical depression west of the Northern Mariana Islands. Tracking west-northwest, the system gradually intensified into Tropical Storm Judy on July 23. By this time, the storm had turned due north. Two days later, Judy attained typhoon status as it began a gradual turn to the west-northwest. Late on July 25, the storm peaked with winds of 165 km/h (105 mph). Striking Kyushu on July 27, interaction with the island's mountainous terrain caused Judy to quickly weaken as it neared South Korea. The weakened storm struck the country west of Pusan the following day before losing its identity near the border with North Korea. The remnants of Judy were last noted over the Sea of Japan.

In Japan, damaging winds from the typhoon left approximately 4 million people without power. Significant flooding in the country resulted in 11 deaths and $28.9 million in damage. In South Korea, heavy rains from the storm exacerbated ongoing floods, leading to at least 20 fatalities. Flooding from the remnants of Judy affected the Soviet Far East, temporarily severing the Trans-Siberian Railway and killing 15 people.

=== Tropical Depression 12W (Luming) ===
- Tropical depression (SSHWS)
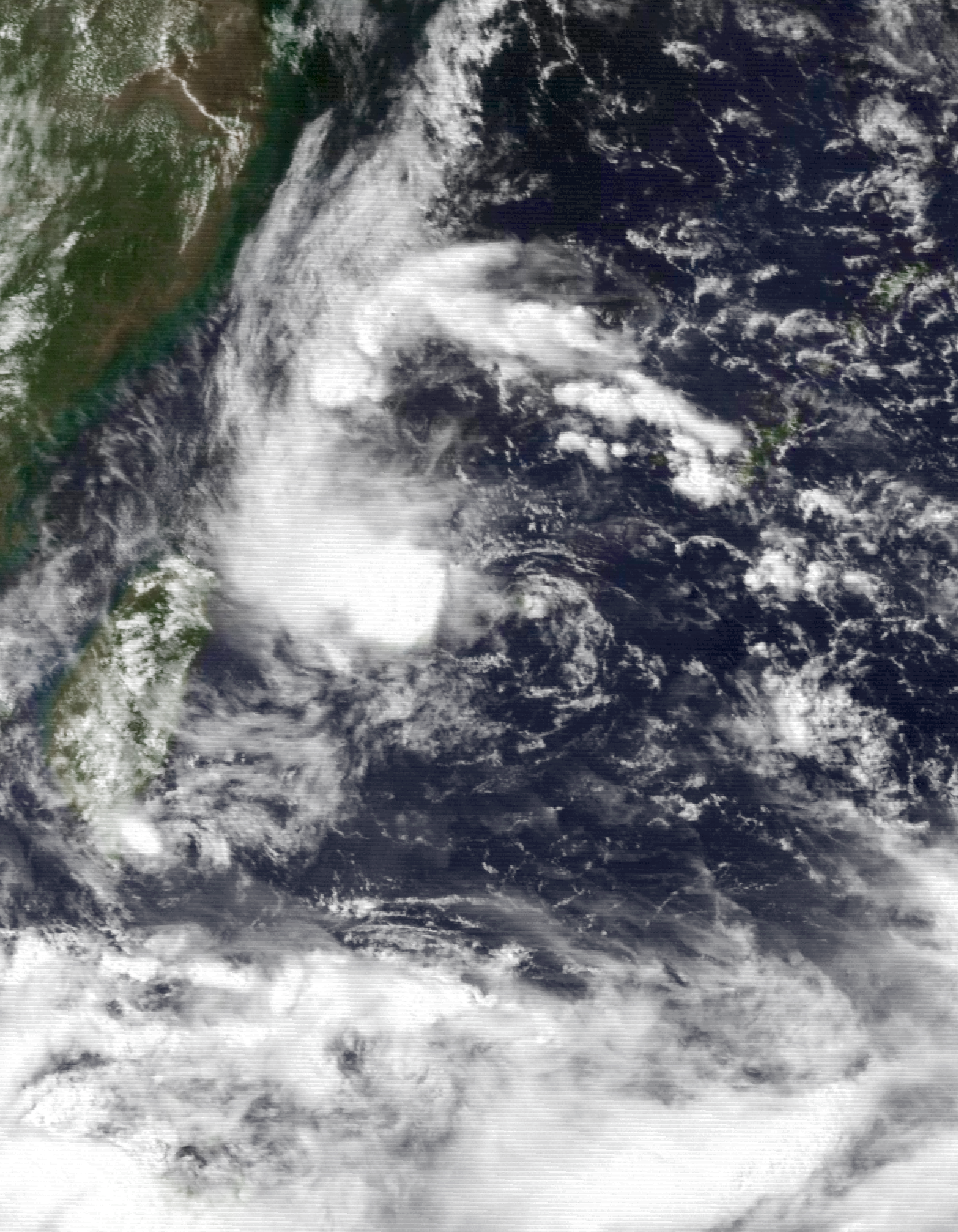
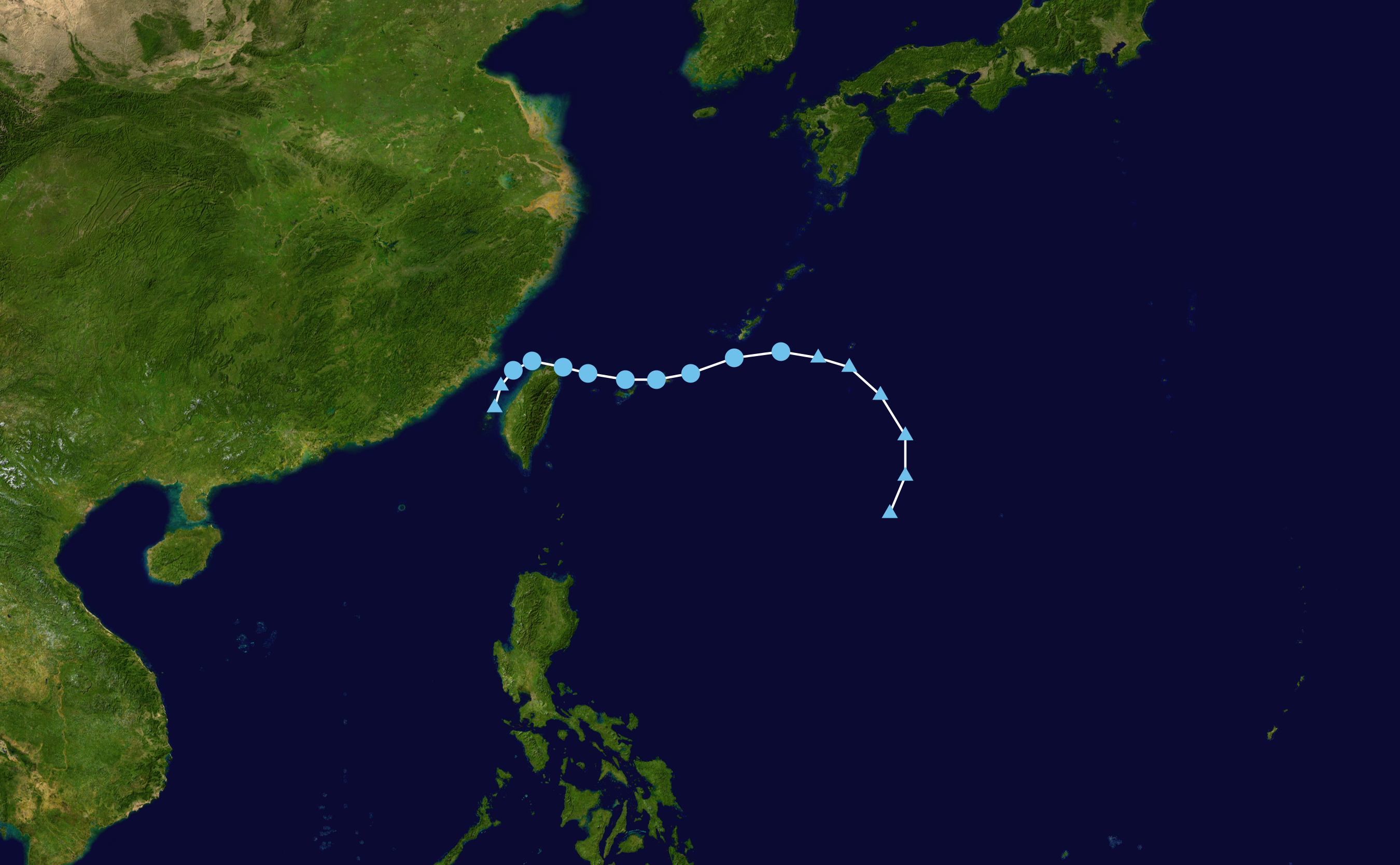
- Duration: July 27 – July 31
- Peak intensity: 55 km/h (35 mph) (1-min); 1000 hPa (mbar)

TD 12W developed out of an active monsoon trough and moved westward for the duration of its existence, never attaining tropical storm status due to high wind shear. After the tropical depression moved over northern Taiwan, The low-level center decoupled from the mid-level center in the Taiwan Strait, and advisories were discontinued.

Between July 26 and 30, heavy rains fell across parts of Taiwan, resulting in deadly floods. At least 16 people perished while 2 others were reported missing. Sixty-three homes were destroyed and forty-two others were damaged by the floods. Nearly 1,000 hectares (2,500 acres) of farmland were inundated, resulting in $31.78 million in losses. Infrastructural damage across the country amounted to $15.74 million. In the wake of the floods, the Government of Taiwan pledged to provide relief funds to those left homeless and family of the deceased.

=== Severe Tropical Storm Ken–Lola (Miling) ===
- Severe tropical storm (JMA)
- Tropical storm (SSHWS)
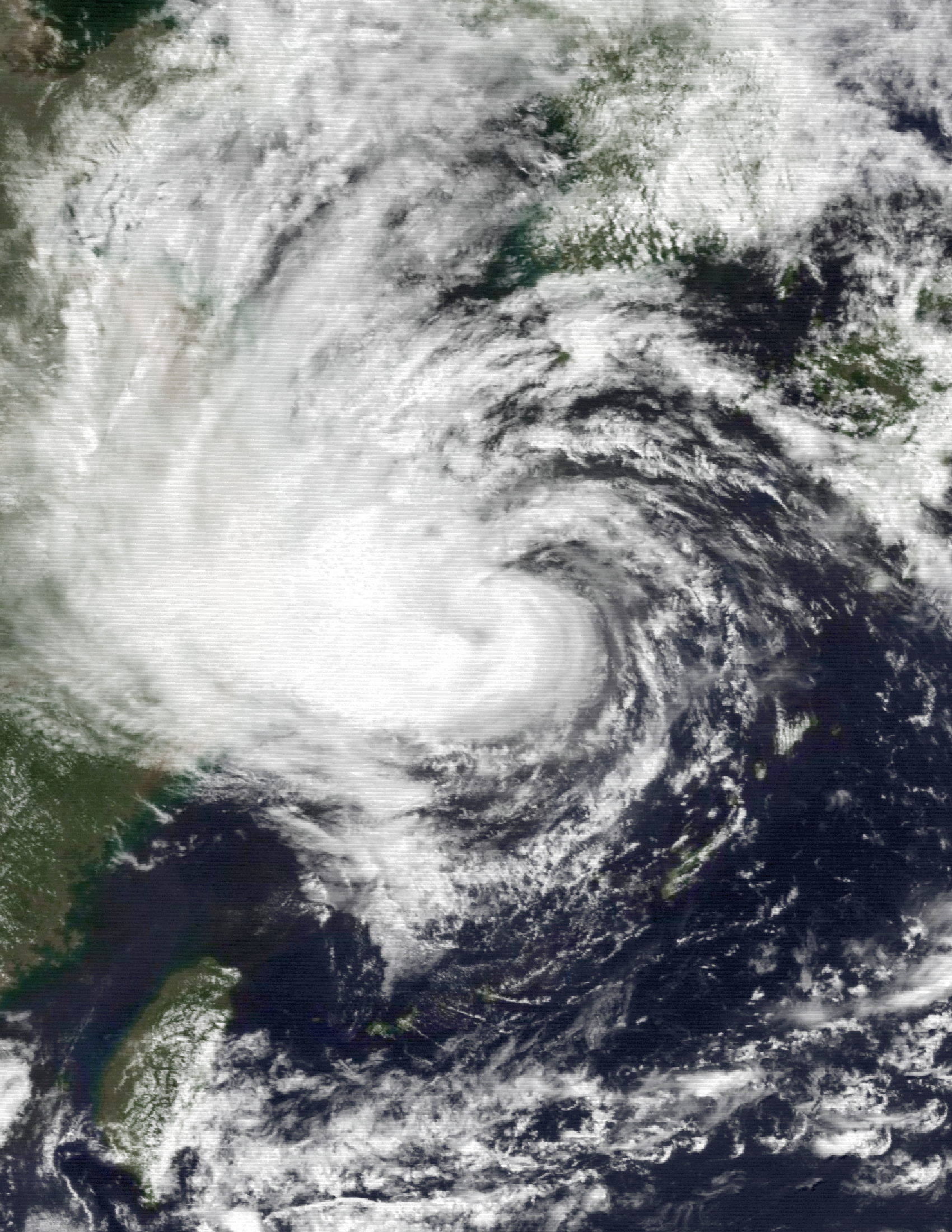
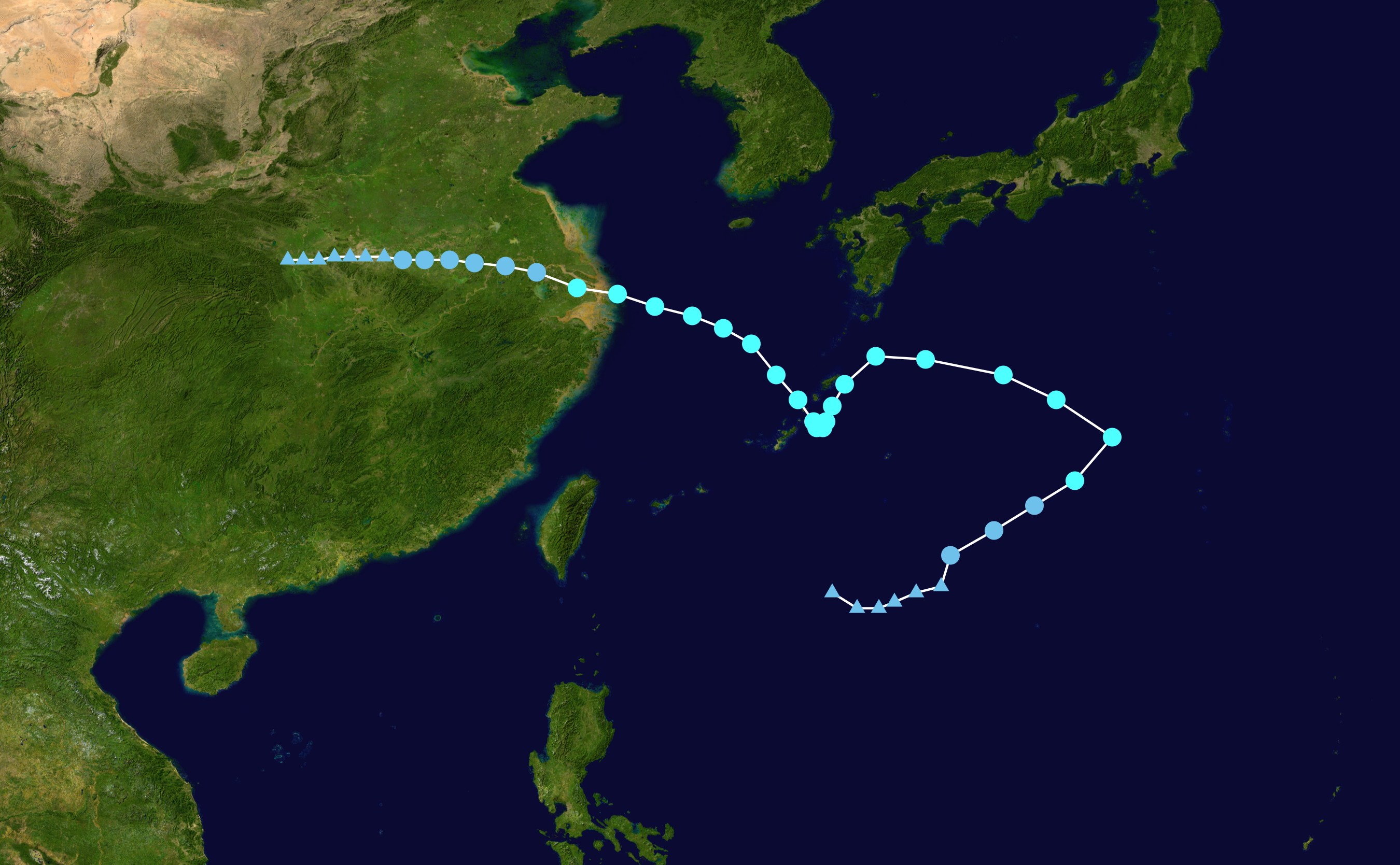
- Duration: July 29 – August 7
- Peak intensity: 100 km/h (65 mph) (10-min); 980 hPa (mbar)

The monsoon trough spawned a tropical depression on July 29. Poorly organized, it moved quickly northeastward and became a tropical storm on July 30. Operationally, Tropical Storm Ken continued northeastward with the rest of the convection, with Tropical Storm Lola forming further westward, but the ill-defined circulation actually continued westward, leading to one storm with two names. Ken–Lola turned to the southwest, stalling before heading northwest again. Ken–Lola reached a peak of 65 mph (105 km/h) winds before hitting eastern China on August 3, causing little damage as it slowly dissipated until August 7. Ken–Lola shows the troubles of tracking poorly organized systems. A more recent example is Tropical Depression 32W/33W in 1995.

Heavy rains associated with Tropical Storm Ken–Lola affected much of Japan as it meandered south of the country for several days. In Tokyo, the storm produced 195 mm (7.7 in) of rain, leading to several mudslides and flash flooding. Areas along the Kanda River were inundated after the river overflowed its banks. At least nine people were killed in and around Tokyo while seventeen others were reported missing. Agricultural damage in Tokushima prefecture were ¥17.5 billion (US$127 million). Losses in the fishing industry were ¥100 million (US$725,000).

Striking the Chinese coastline near Shanghai, rains from Tropical Storm Ken–Lola caused the Huangpu River to rise above its warning level; damages were estimated to be at 4 million RMB (US$1.07 million).

=== Typhoon Mac ===
- Typhoon (JMA)
- Category 1 typhoon (SSHWS)
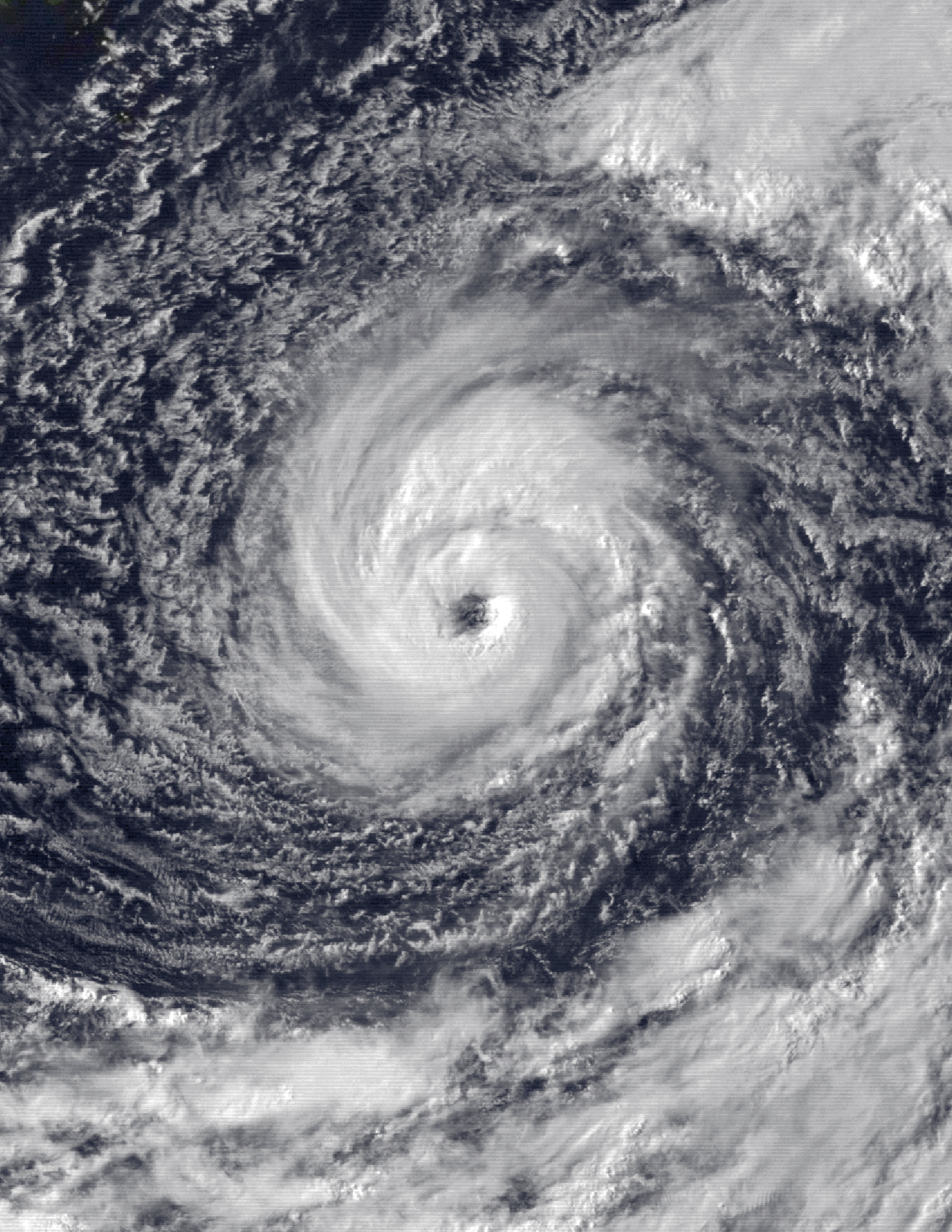
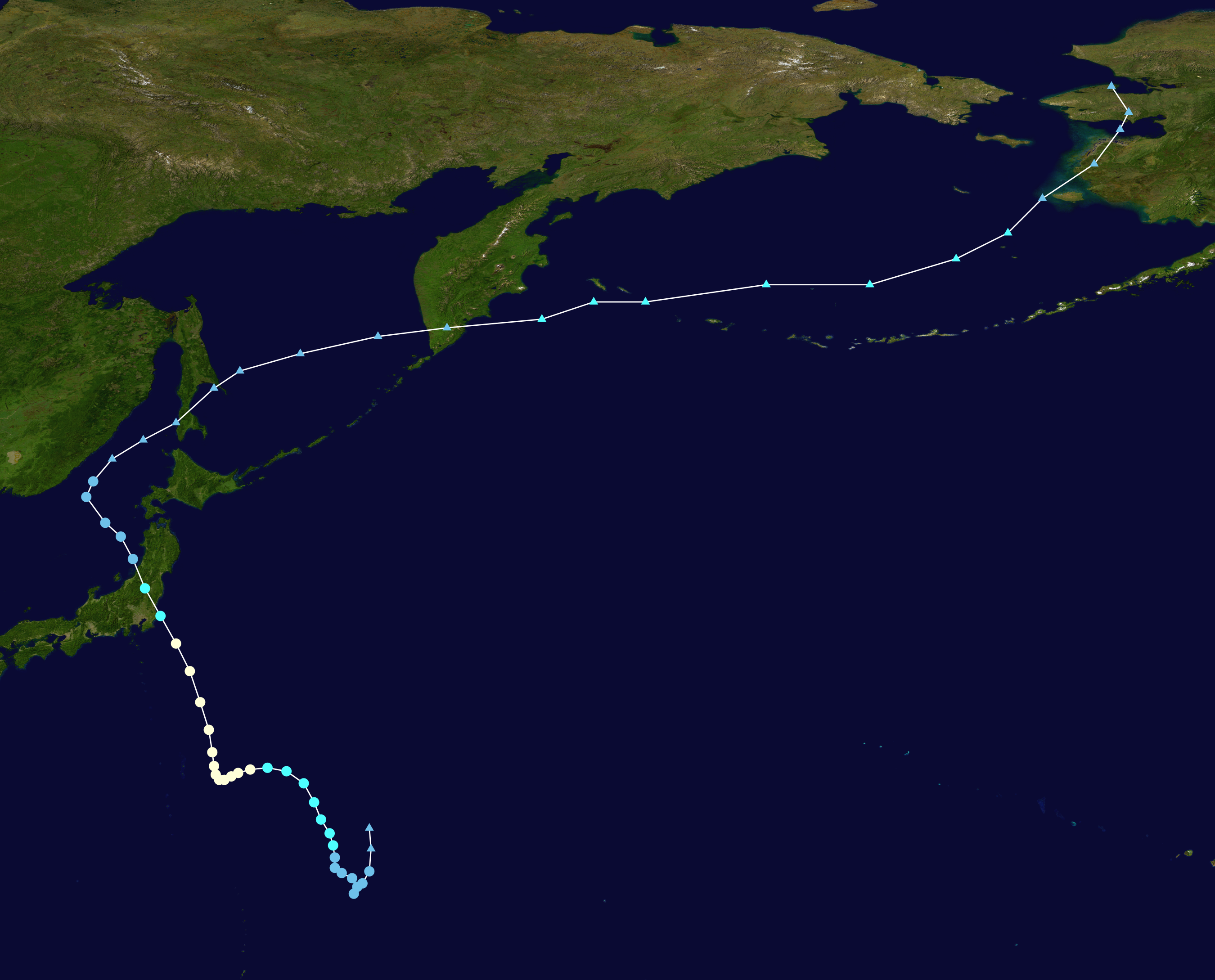
- Duration: July 30 – August 8
- Peak intensity: 150 km/h (90 mph) (10-min); 950 hPa (mbar)

Moving around the northeast side of Ken–Lola, and then an upper tropospheric cyclone, Mac moved along a wide northwest arc before settling on a north-northwest track into Japan as a typhoon on August 6, dissipating over Sakhalin Island on August 8. Mac flooded 5,063 homes, destroyed 159 homes, killed 15 people, and injured 26 more. Damage to forestry in Saitama Prefecture was ¥250 million (US$1.81 million).

=== Typhoon Nancy ===
- Typhoon (JMA)
- Category 1 typhoon (SSHWS)
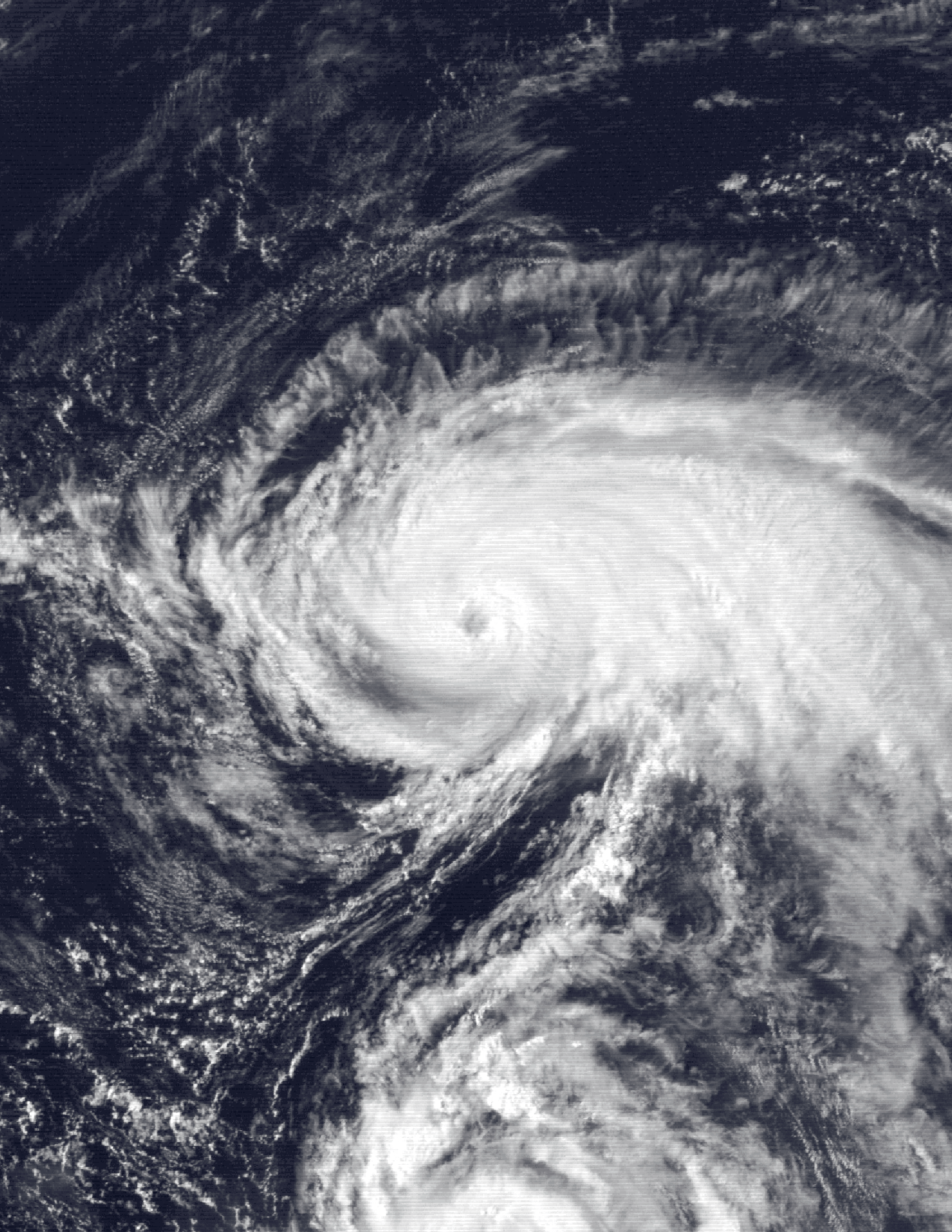
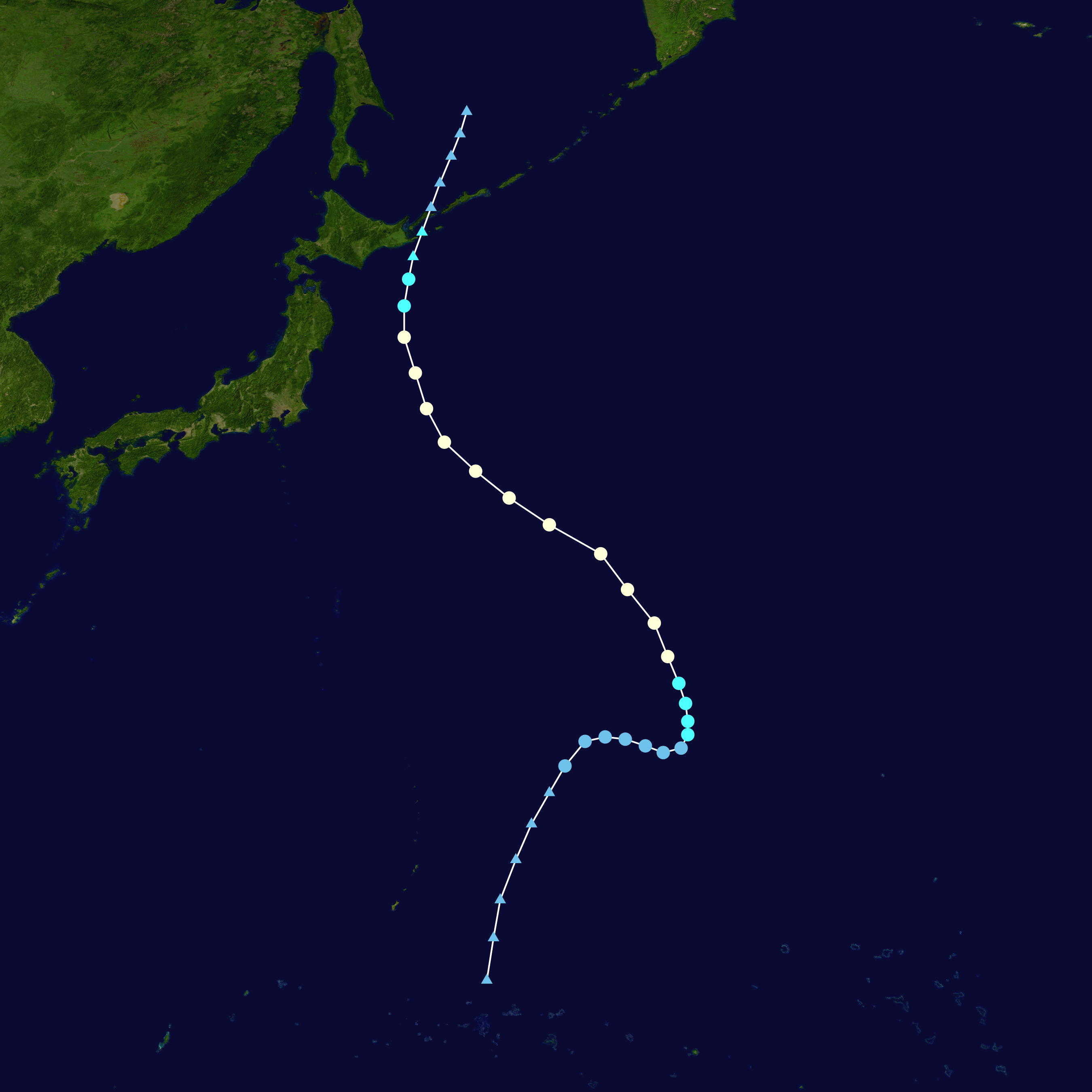
- Duration: August 11 – August 16
- Peak intensity: 130 km/h (80 mph) (10-min); 965 hPa (mbar)

A tropical disturbance formed from a monsoon trough on August 9. It continued developing and became a tropical depression on the 11th once satellite imagery revealed a developing central dense overcast. It was named Nancy the next day. Nancy would break free of the monsoon trough and begin rapidly intensifying, becoming a typhoon in less than a day after getting named. Nancy interacted with Owen to the south, where the two systems rotated around each other. Nancy accelerated and reached a peak of 85 mph (140 km/h) on the 13th before veering to the northwest. Nancy weakened significantly and became extratropical on the 16th just east of Hokkaido.

=== Typhoon Owen ===
- Typhoon (JMA)
- Category 1 typhoon (SSHWS)
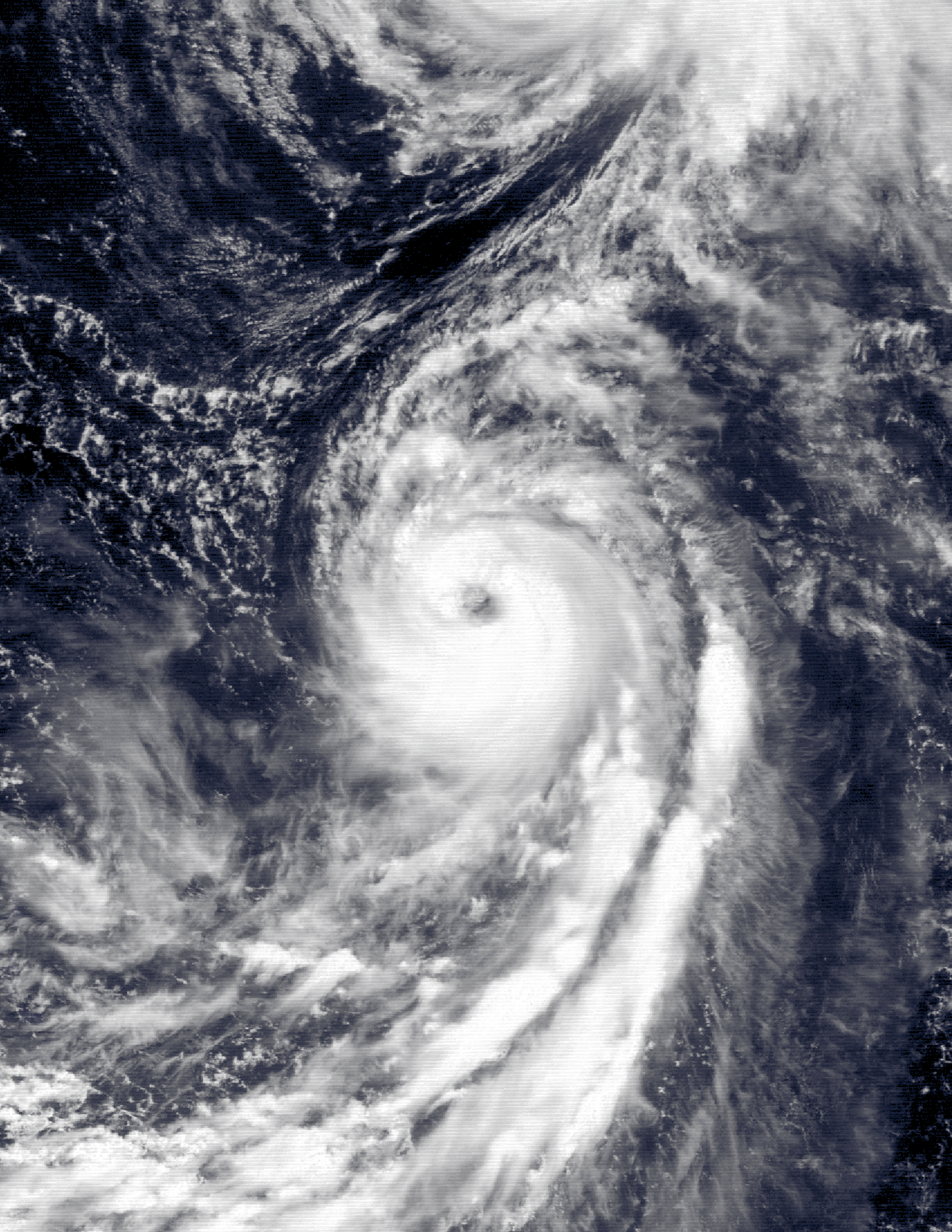
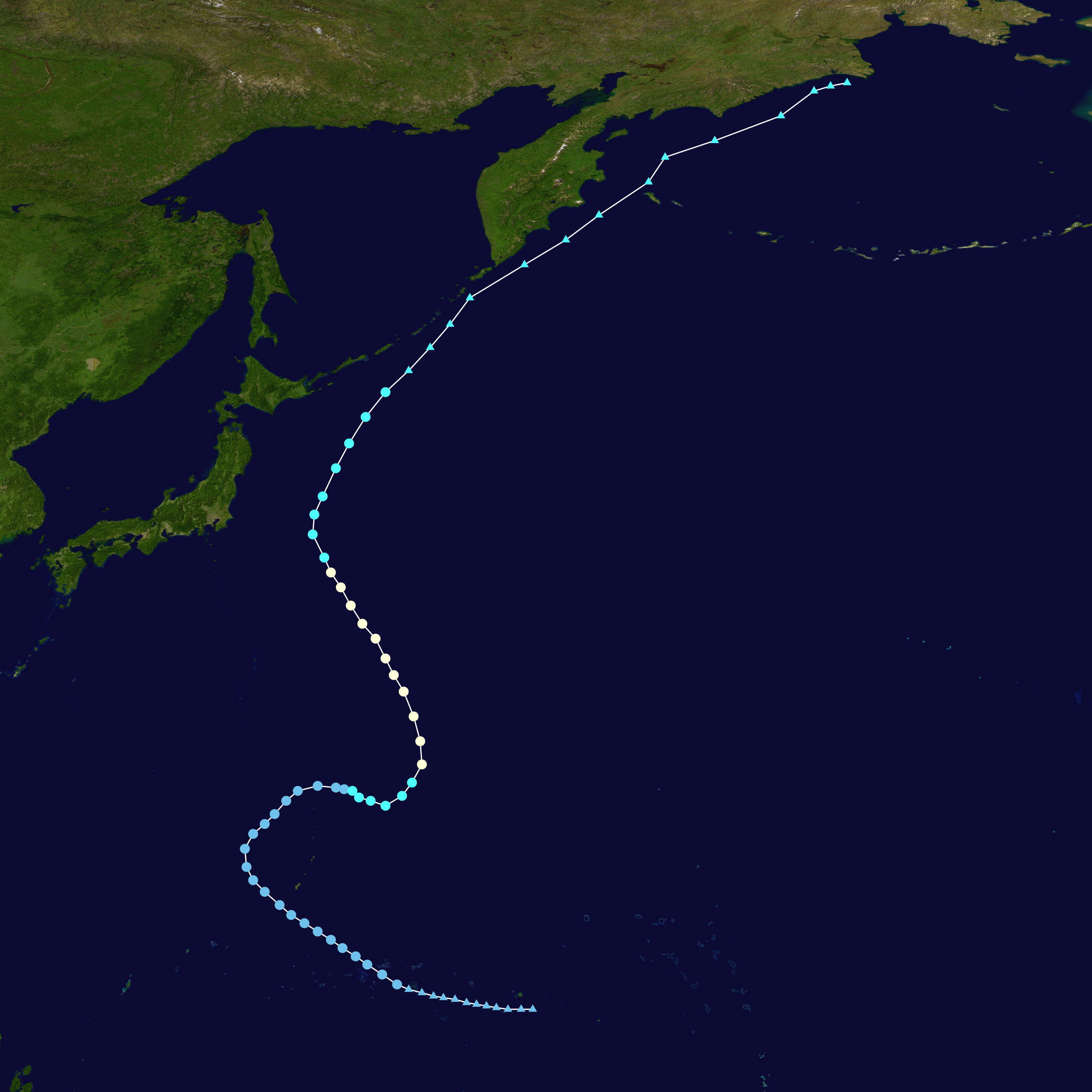
- Duration: August 11 – August 18
- Peak intensity: 140 km/h (85 mph) (10-min); 960 hPa (mbar)

A disturbance formed on August 4 in a monsoon trough, and took longer to intensify due to Nancy's presence up north. The system intensified to a tropical depression on the 11th and tracked northeastward through the northern Mariana Islands. It was named Owen the next day and further intensified to a typhoon the following day with a peak intensity of 85 mph (140 km/h). Owen began to weaken and struggle by Nancy's upper-level westerly flow. Owen recurved around the ridge and accelerated to the northeast, dissipating on the 18th.

=== Tropical Storm Peggy ===
- Tropical storm (JMA)
- Tropical storm (SSHWS)
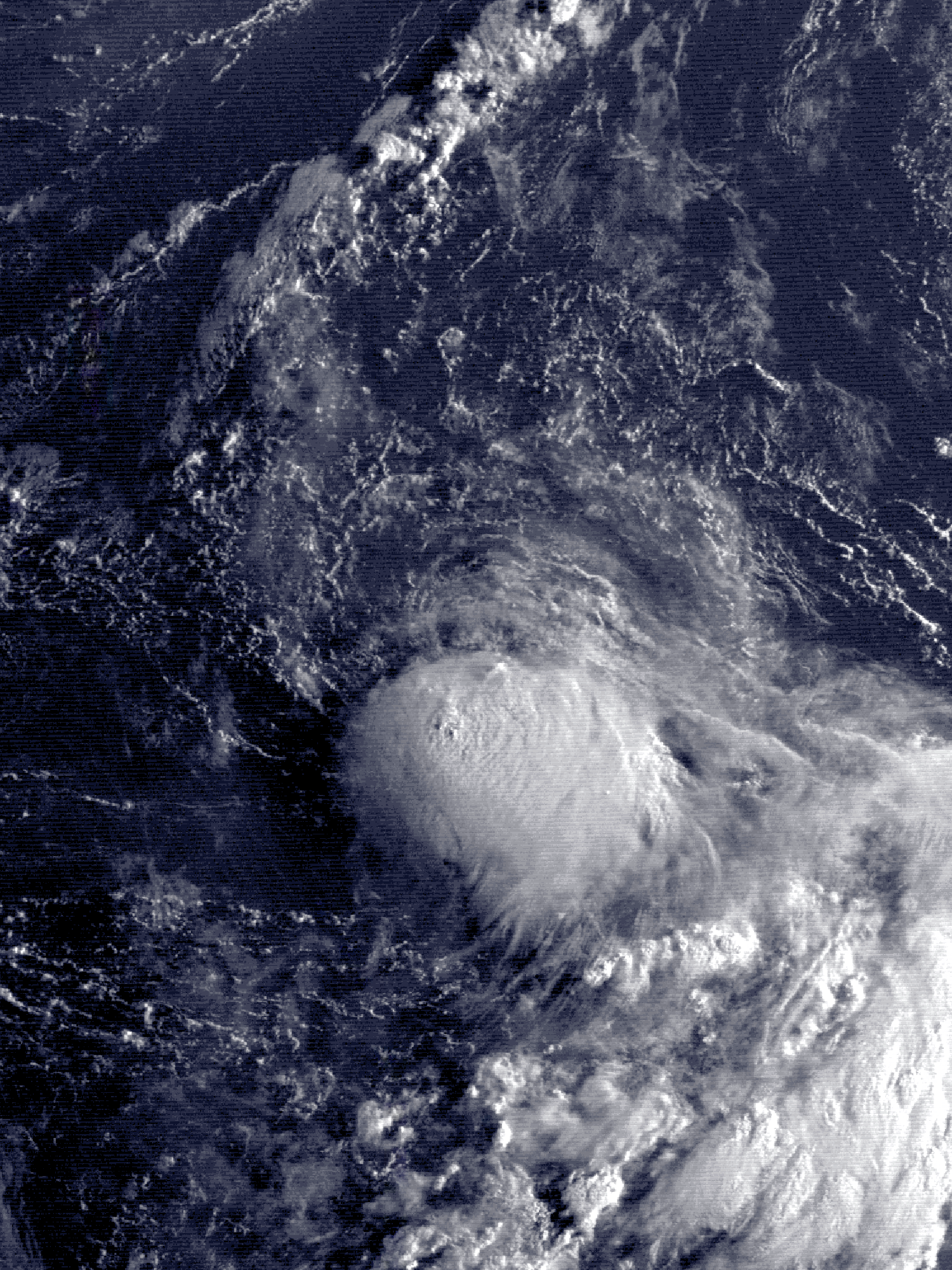
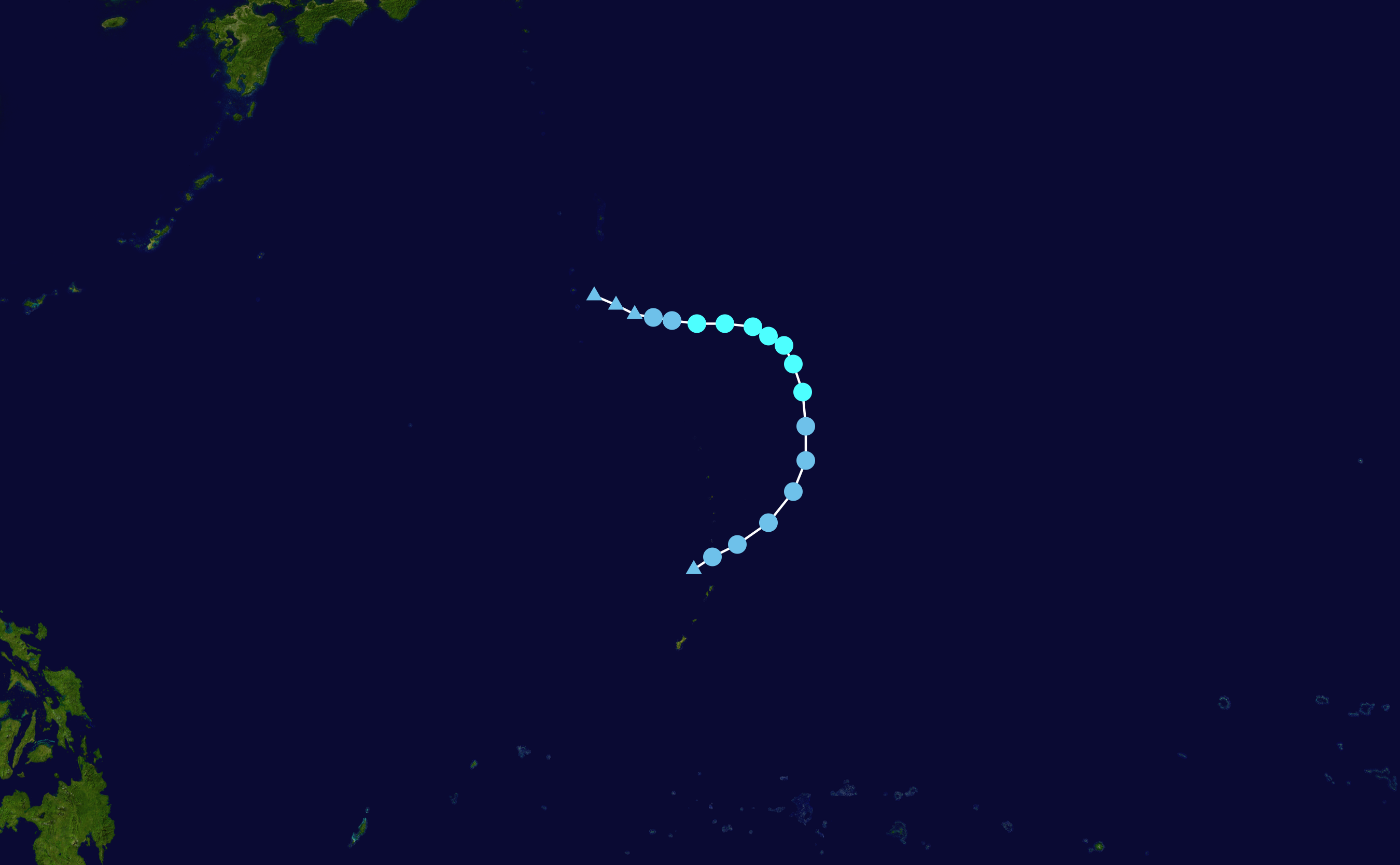
- Duration: August 16 – August 18
- Peak intensity: 65 km/h (40 mph) (10-min); 996 hPa (mbar)

A short lived tropical storm existed near the Northern Mariana Islands in mid-August. Forming on August 16, Peggy attained minimal tropical storm status before succumbing to wind shear and dissipating on August 18.

=== Tropical Depression 19W ===
- Tropical depression (SSHWS)
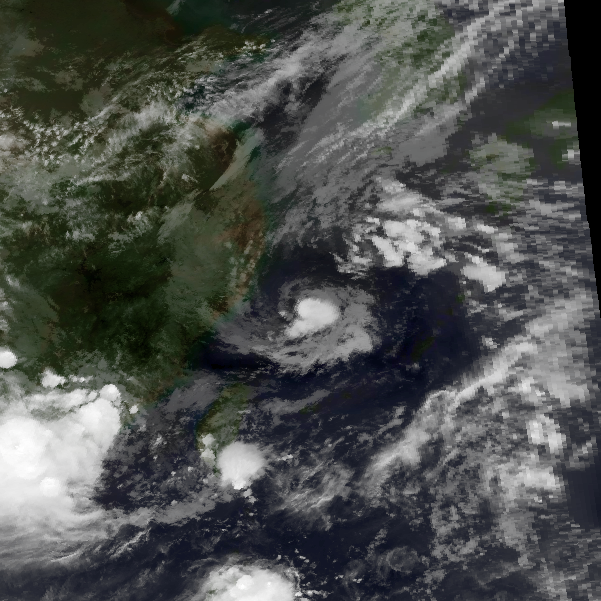
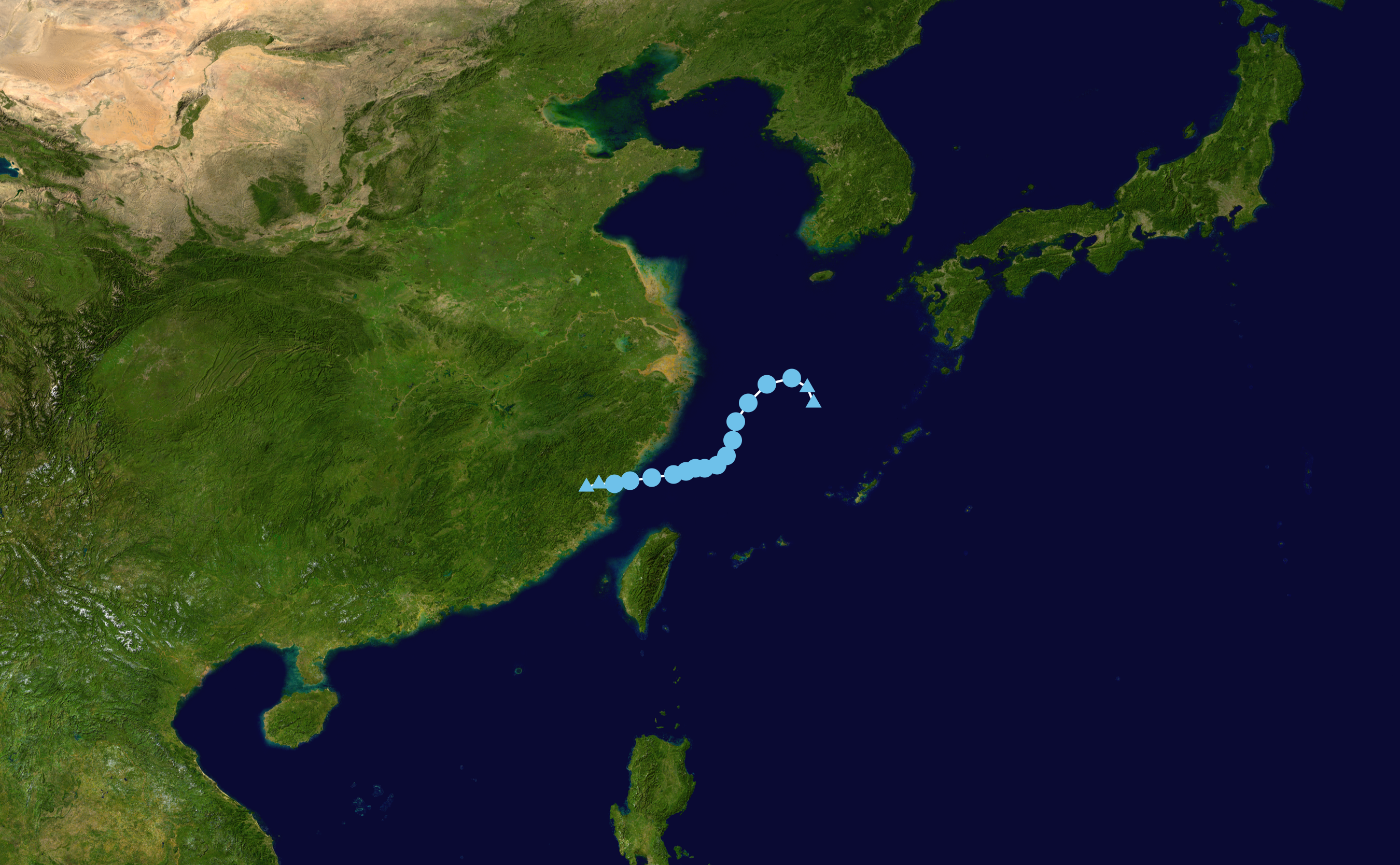
- Duration: August 16 – August 19
- Peak intensity: 55 km/h (35 mph) (1-min); 1000 hPa (mbar)

On August 16, a large area of low pressure centered about 335 km (208 mi) northwest of Okinawa began to show signs of possible tropical cyclogenesis. Initially, the storm's center was mostly cloud-free as subsidence from the mid-level low suppressed convective activity. Later on August 16, however, strong divergence moved into the region and allowed for showers and thunderstorms to form. Subsequently, the JTWC issued a Tropical Cyclone Formation Alert and later issued the first advisory on Tropical Depression 19W early on August 17.

=== Severe Tropical Storm Roger (Narsing) ===
- Severe tropical storm (JMA)
- Tropical storm (SSHWS)
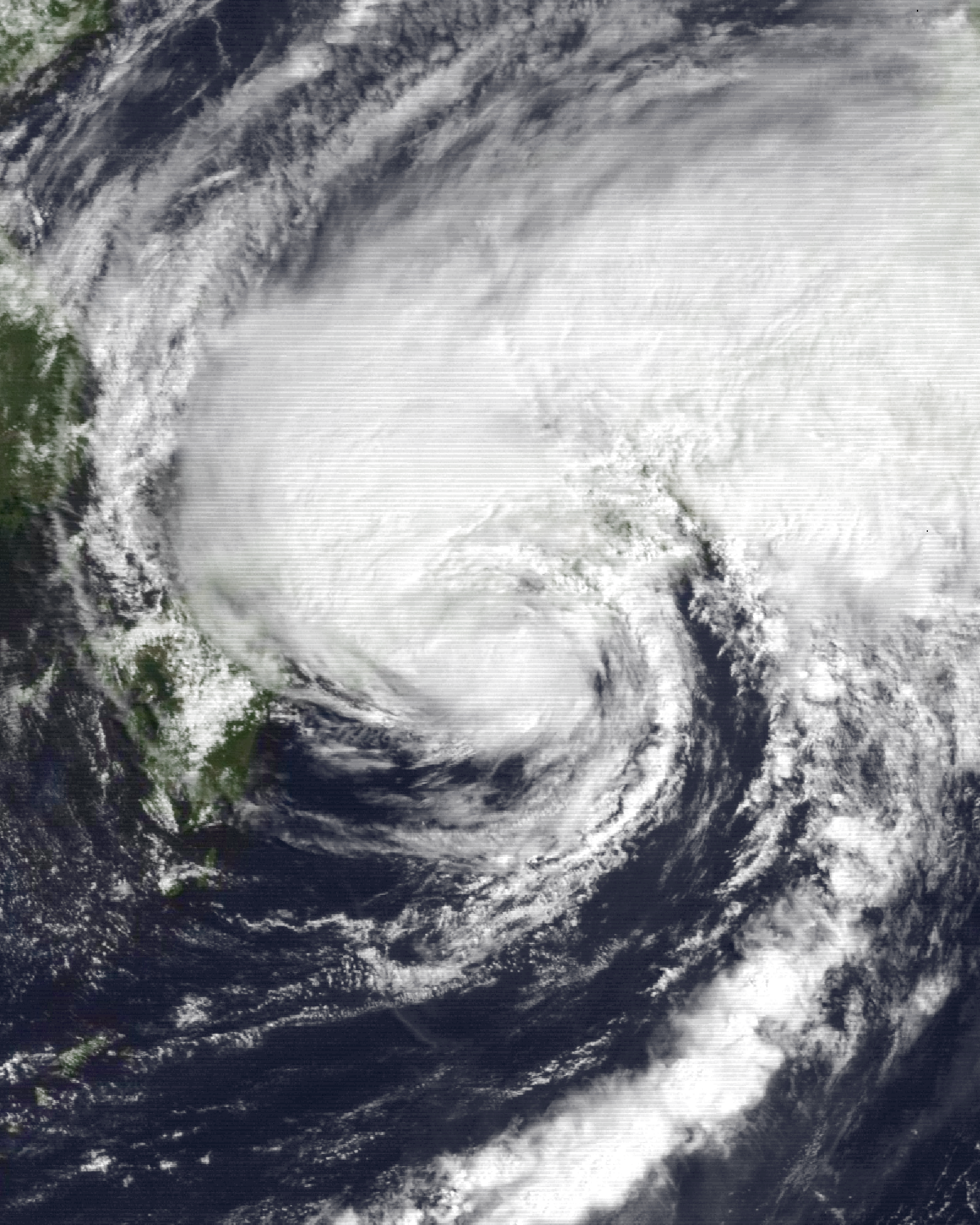
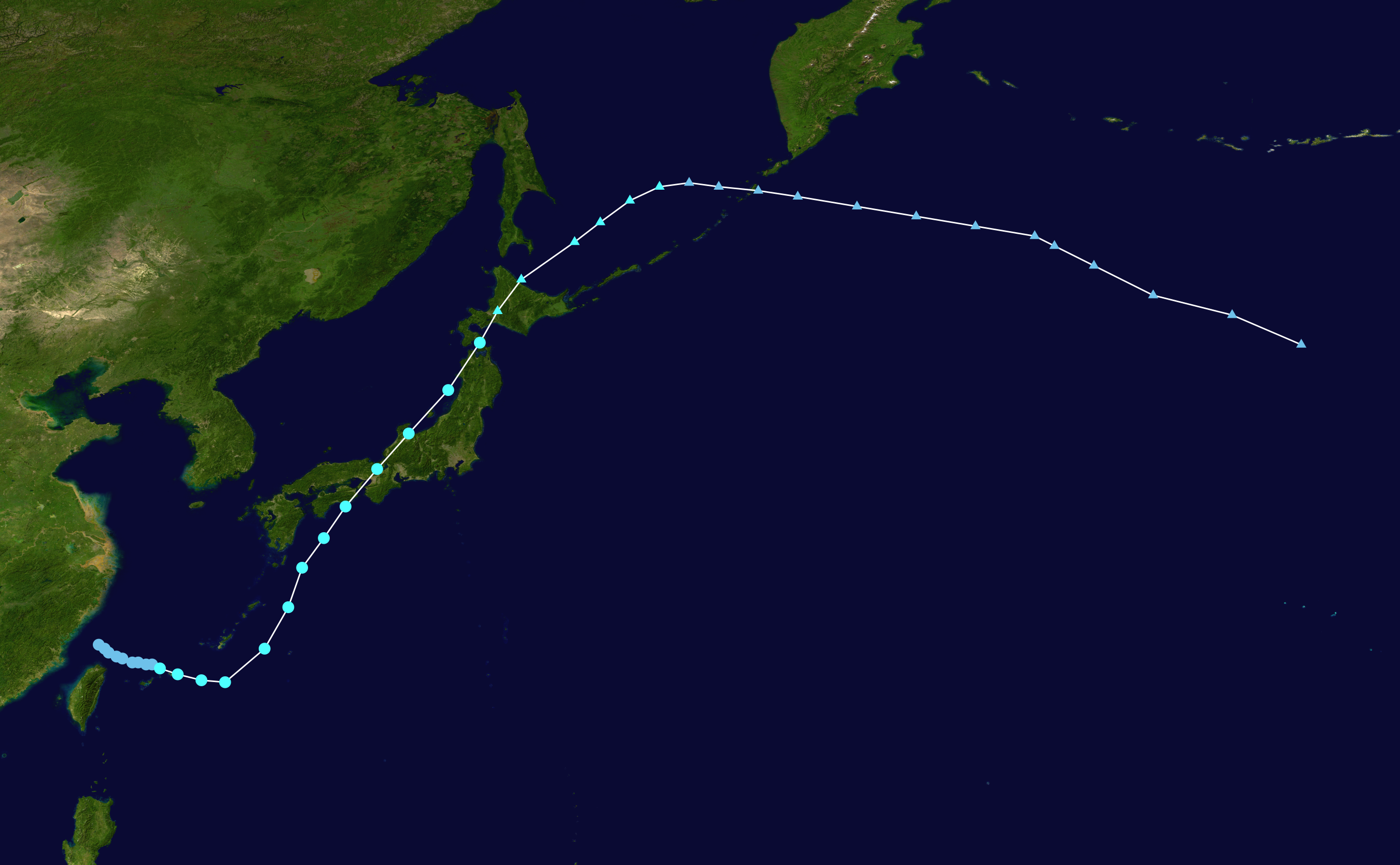
- Duration: August 24 – August 28
- Peak intensity: 100 km/h (65 mph) (10-min); 975 hPa (mbar)

A tropical disturbance began to organize just to the north of Taiwan while moving eastwards. The disturbance consolidated to a depression on August 24 and was named Tropical Storm Roger the next day. Roger then abruptly turned towards the northeast and accelerated. Roger reached peak intensity of 60 mph (97 km/h) just before landfall at Cape Muroto on Shikoku Island.

Tropical Storm Roger produced significant rainfall across the majority of Japan, affecting areas from the Ryukyu Islands to Hokkaido. The heaviest rains fell over the Kii Peninsula and Shikoku, with 505 and 464 mm (19.9 and 18.3 in) measured in Hidegadake, Nara and Kubokawa, Kōchi respectively. These rains triggered widespread flooding that killed at least three people. In Osaka, a train derailed and crashed into a buffer, resulting in 50 injuries. It is unknown if the accident was the result of Roger, though many trains at the time were cancelled due to flooding. At least 1,071 homes were flooded across the country and numerous roads were washed out. Total damage amounted to ¥149 million (US$1.08 million).

=== Tropical Storm 21W ===
- Tropical storm (JMA)
- Tropical depression (SSHWS)
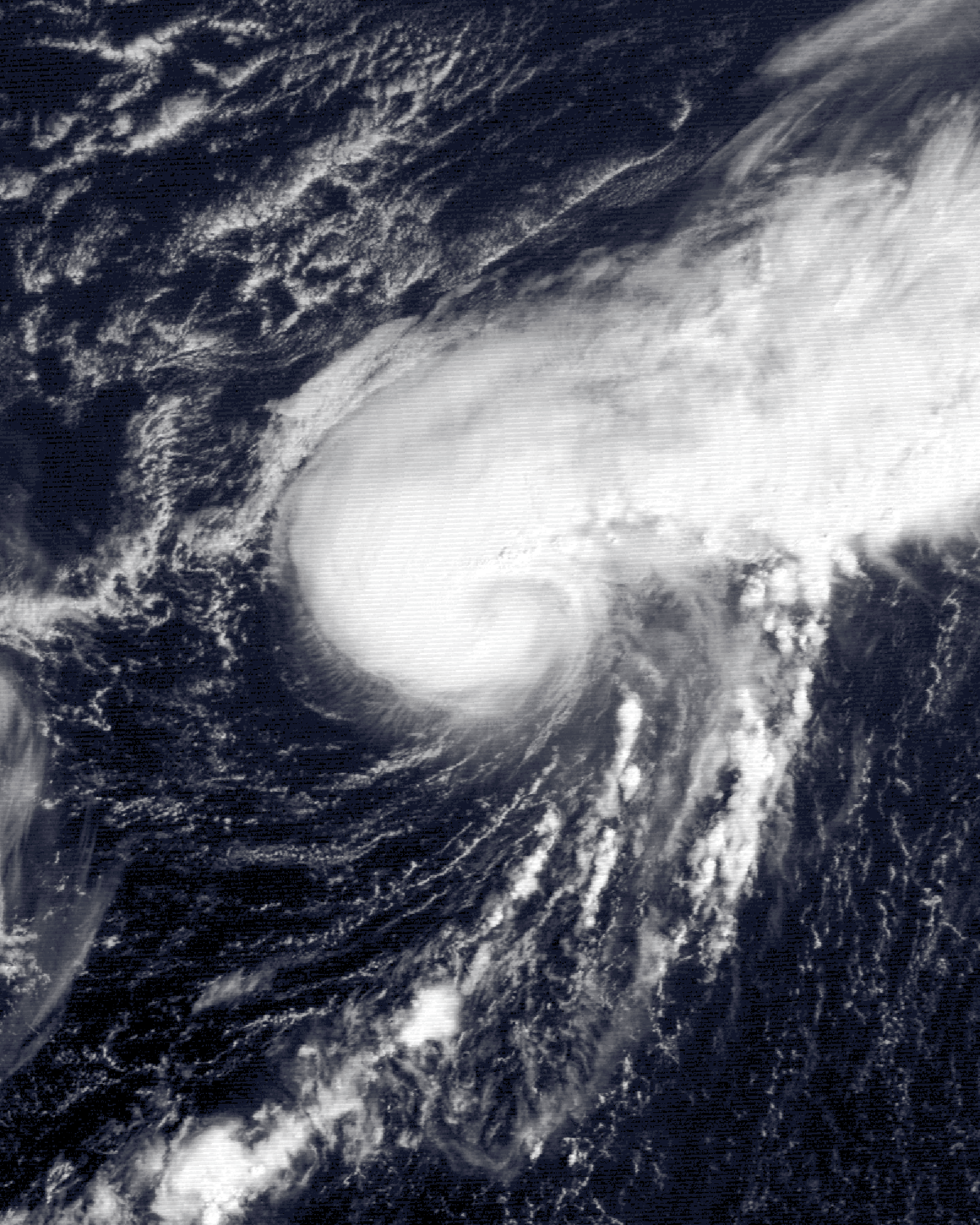
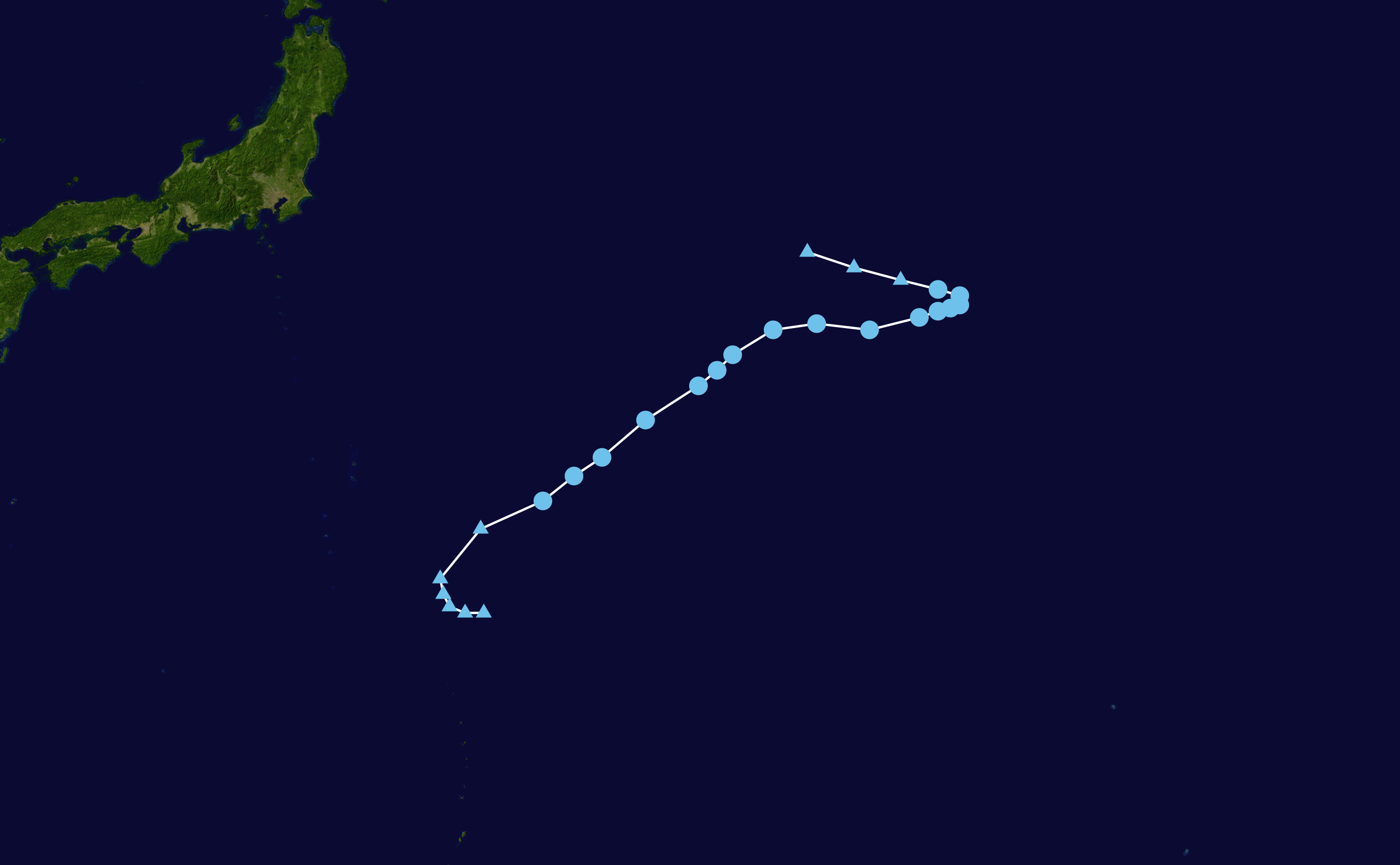
- Duration: August 23 – August 29
- Peak intensity: 65 km/h (40 mph) (10-min); 1002 hPa (mbar)

On August 23, a tropical depression formed well to the north-northeast of Guam. Tracking northeast, the depression struggled to intensify amidst wind shear. According to the JMA, the system attained tropical storm intensity on August 26. By August 27, the storm weakened due to persistent shear and later dissipated on August 29.

=== Typhoon Sarah (Openg) ===
- Typhoon (JMA)
- Category 4 typhoon (SSHWS)
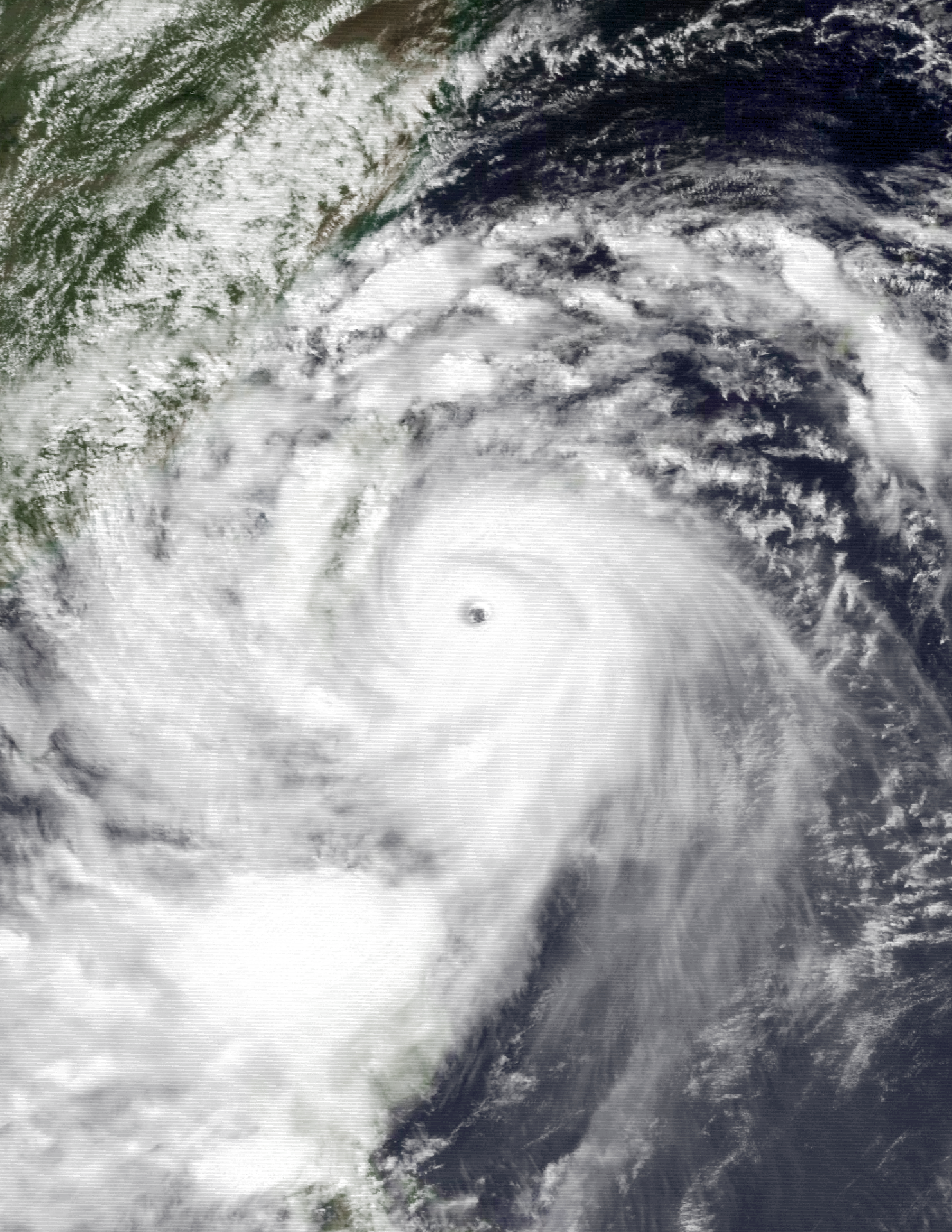
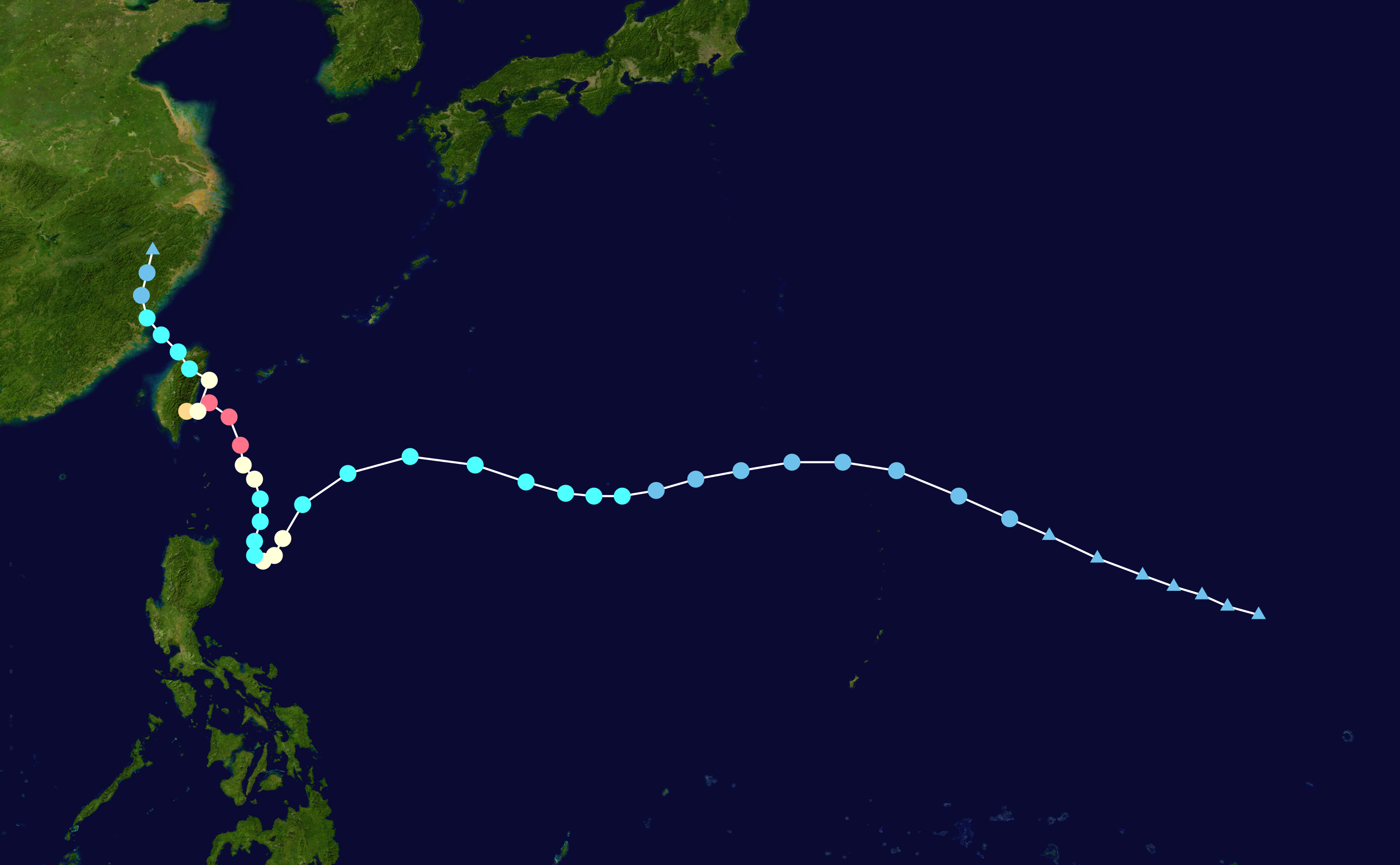
- Duration: September 3 – September 14
- Peak intensity: 150 km/h (90 mph) (10-min); 950 hPa (mbar)

Originating from a disturbance within a monsoon trough in early September, Sarah was first classified as a tropical depression near the Mariana Islands on September 5. Moving quickly westward, the depression soon strengthened into Tropical Storm Sarah. On September 8, the storm abruptly turned southward and temporarily attained typhoon status. Following a series of interactions with secondary areas of low pressure, the storm turned northward the following day. By September 11, Sarah entered a region favoring development and underwent a period of explosive intensification. At the end of this phase, the storm attained its peak intensity as a Category 4-equivalent typhoon on the Saffir–Simpson hurricane scale. The typhoon subsequently weakened rapidly and made two landfalls in Taiwan by September 12. After moving over the Taiwan Strait, Sarah made its final landfall in eastern China on September 13 before dissipating the following day.

While the typhoon meandered near the Philippines, it brought several days of heavy rain to much of Luzon, triggering extensive flash flooding. At least 44 people perished across the country and another 200,000 were left homeless. Striking Taiwan as a strong typhoon, Sarah caused widespread wind damage that left approximately 840,000 residents without power. Excessive rainfall associated with the storm triggered flooding that washed away highways and inundated about 40,500 hectares (100,000 acres) of farmland. Throughout the island, Sarah was responsible for 19 fatalities and at least US$171 million (4.38 billion New Taiwan dollars) in damage. Four deaths also took place on the Gotō Islands. Additionally, four deaths took place offshore and another seventeen people were listed as missing.

=== Severe Tropical Storm Tip ===
- Severe tropical storm (JMA)
- Tropical storm (SSHWS)
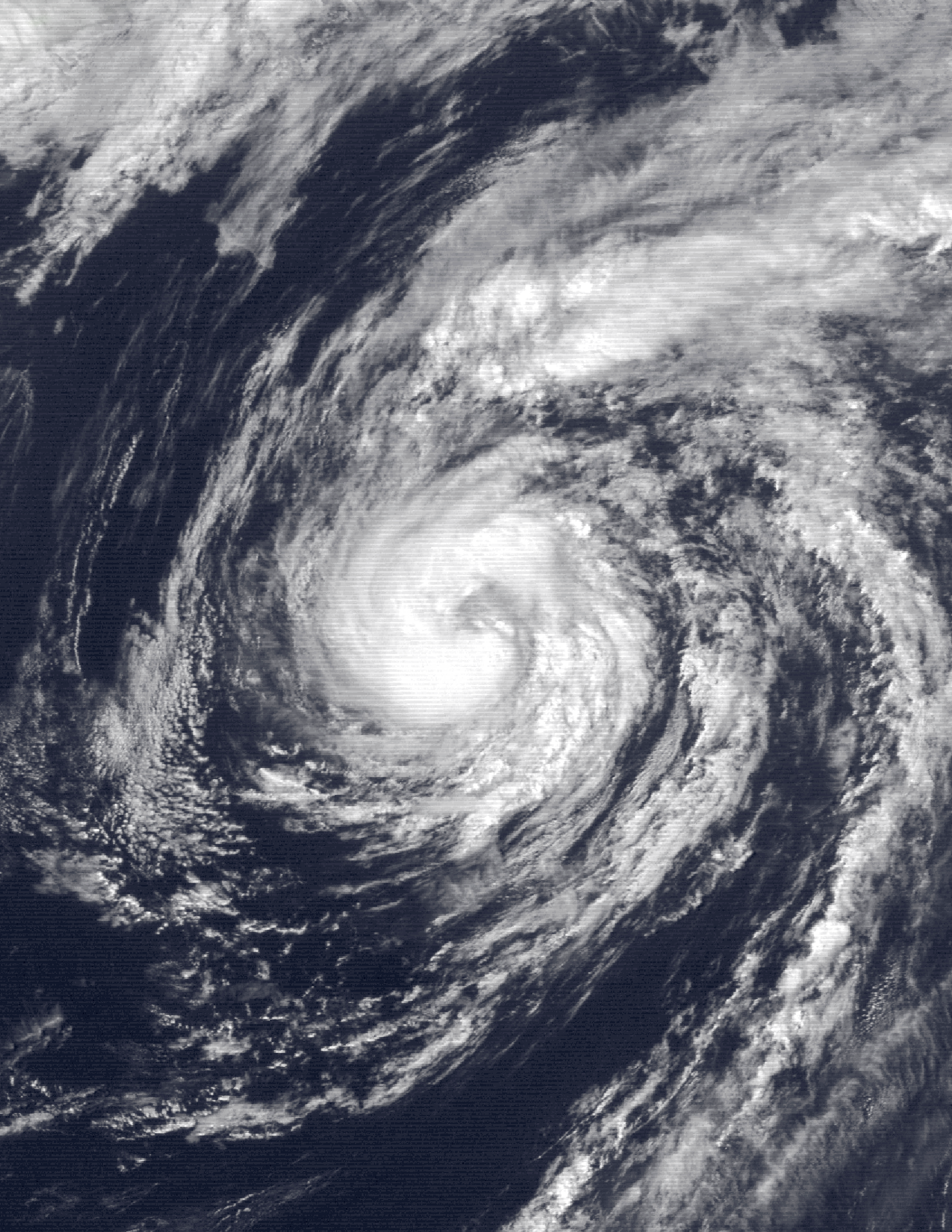
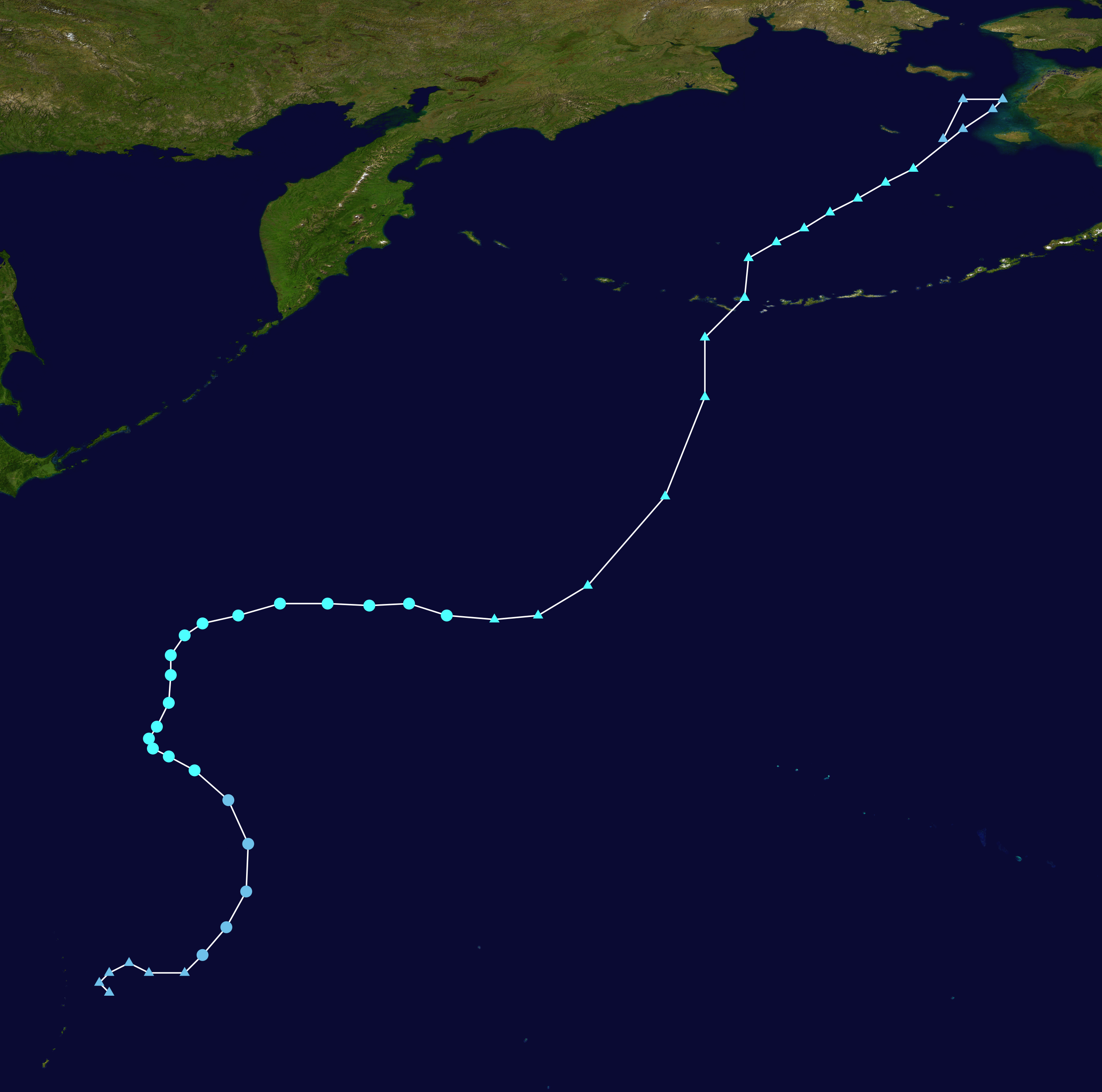
- Duration: September 8 – September 14
- Peak intensity: 95 km/h (60 mph) (10-min); 985 hPa (mbar)

Tip formed along the eastern portion of the monsoon trough, and tracked northeast until the subtropical ridge blocked its motion in that direction. Rounding the western periphery of the ridge, Tip eventually recurved well offshore Japan and became an extratropical cyclone.

=== Severe Tropical Storm Vera (Pining) ===
- Severe tropical storm (JMA)
- Tropical storm (SSHWS)
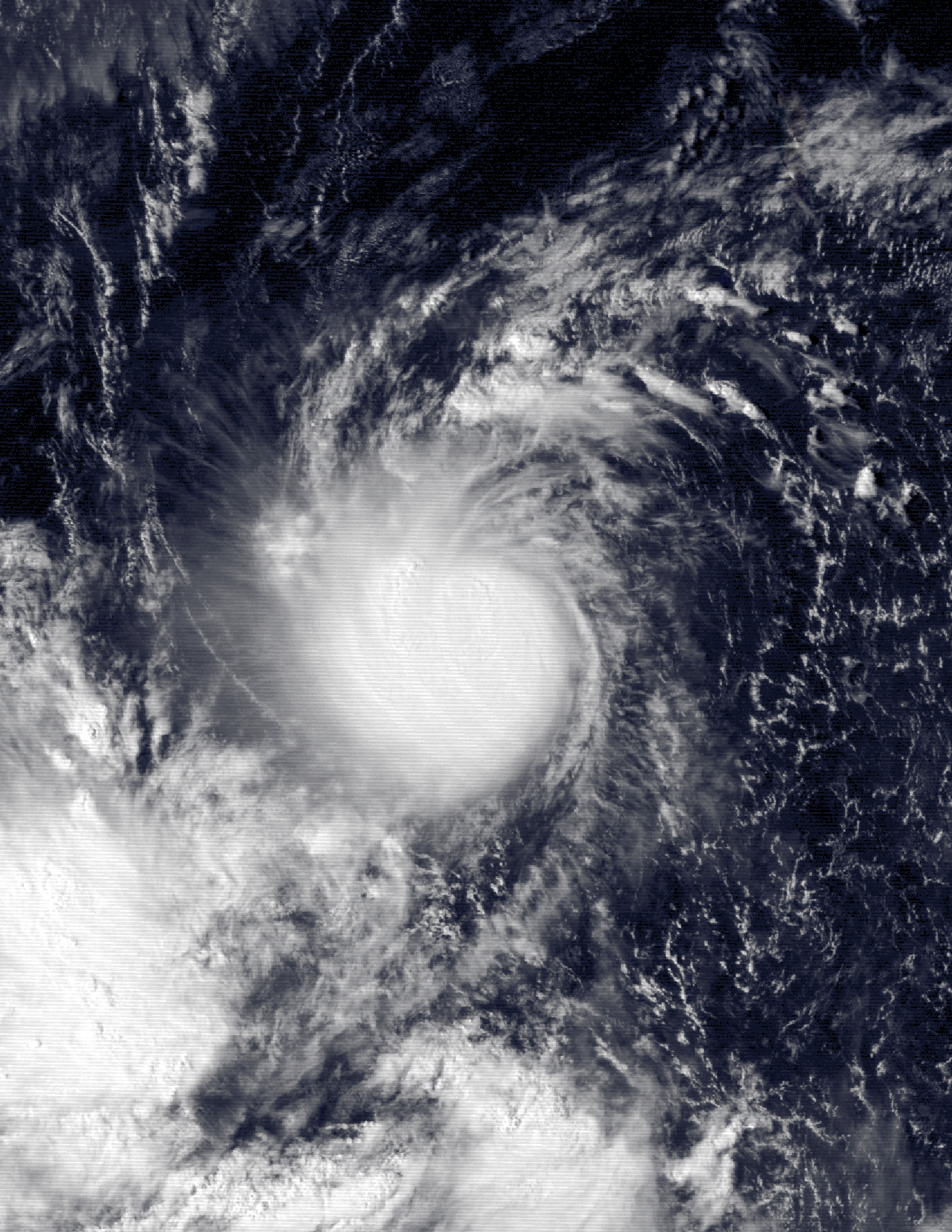
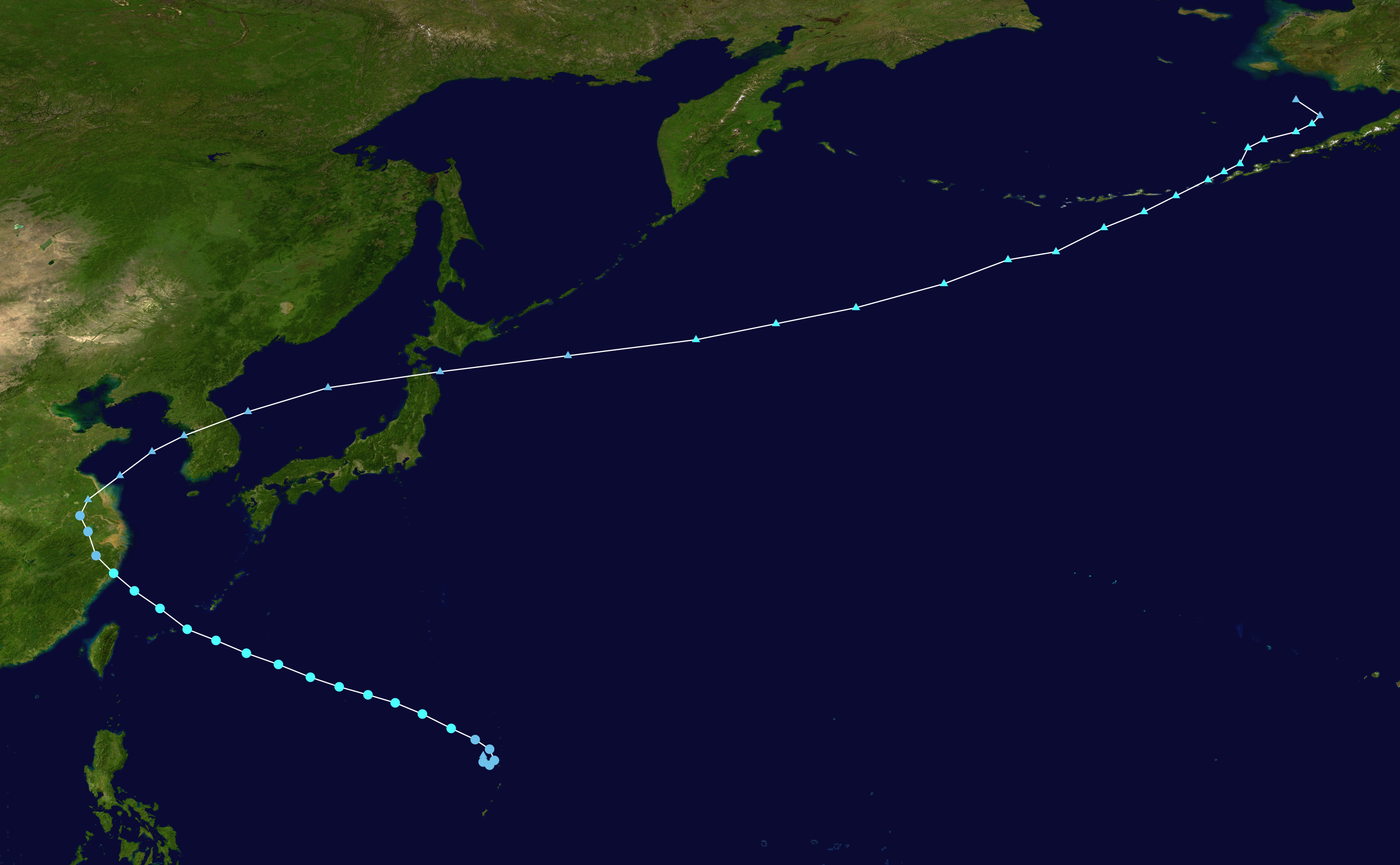
- Duration: September 11 – September 16
- Peak intensity: 100 km/h (65 mph) (10-min); 980 hPa (mbar)

On September 10, an area of low-level convergence developed within a monsoon trough several hundred kilometres north of Guam. Following the development of persistent convection, the JTWC issued a TCFA early on September 11 before classifying it as a tropical depression 26 hours later. Initially, the system moved slowly and erratically before being steered west-northwest by a subtropical ridge. Shortly after being declared a depression, the system intensified into Tropical Storm Vera. Only modest strengthening took place thereafter, with the system attaining peak winds of 95 km/h (60 mph). Accelerating towards China, Vera gradually weakened due to increasing wind shear. After passing 185 km (115 mi) south of Okinawa on September 14, the storm made landfall about 240 km (150 mi) south of Shanghai the next day. Once onshore, Vera weakened to a tropical depression as it turned northward. The remnants of Vera later transitioned into an extratropical cyclone on September 16 as it emerged over the Yellow Sea. The system tracked east-northeast for several days, passing over South Korea and northern Japan before moving over north Pacific Ocean. Vera was last noted as a powerful system near the International Date Line on September 19 with a central pressure of 964 mbar (hPa; 28.47 inHg).

Although only a tropical storm at landfall, torrential rains associated with Vera triggered widespread flooding throughout eastern China. Damage from the storm was regarded as the worst in 27 years. Large parts of Zhejiang Province were inundated by the storm, including the port city of Shujiang. Early reports indicated that at least 190 people were injured near Shanghai. Two days after the storm, only scarce reports on the scale of damage were available. On September 18, officials announced over national television that at least 72 people were killed and hundreds were missing. By then, workers began repairing damaged coastlines and building up stone sea walls. According to the nation's flood control officials, approximately 347,000 hectares (860,000 acres) of farmland and 16,000 hectares (40,000 acres) of crops were flooded by the storm. At least 162 people were killed and another 354 were listed as missing. Additionally, 692 people were injured by the storm. Immense structural losses took place throughout the province with 3.1 million homes damaged or destroyed. Additionally, 430 km (270 mi) of coastal dykes and 174 km (108 mi) of irrigation ditches were washed away. Total losses throughout Zhejiang Province reached $351 million. Significant losses also took place in nearby Jiangsu Province where 34 people were killed and an estimated 2,000 more were injured. Approximately 590,000 hectares (1.5 million acres) of farmland was inundated by the storm and total losses reached $485,000. Throughout eastern China, approximately 5.86 million households (23 million people) were affected by flooding triggered by the storm. According to the news estimates, a total of 500–700 people died as a result of Vera.

=== Typhoon Wayne ===
- Typhoon (JMA)
- Category 1 typhoon (SSHWS)
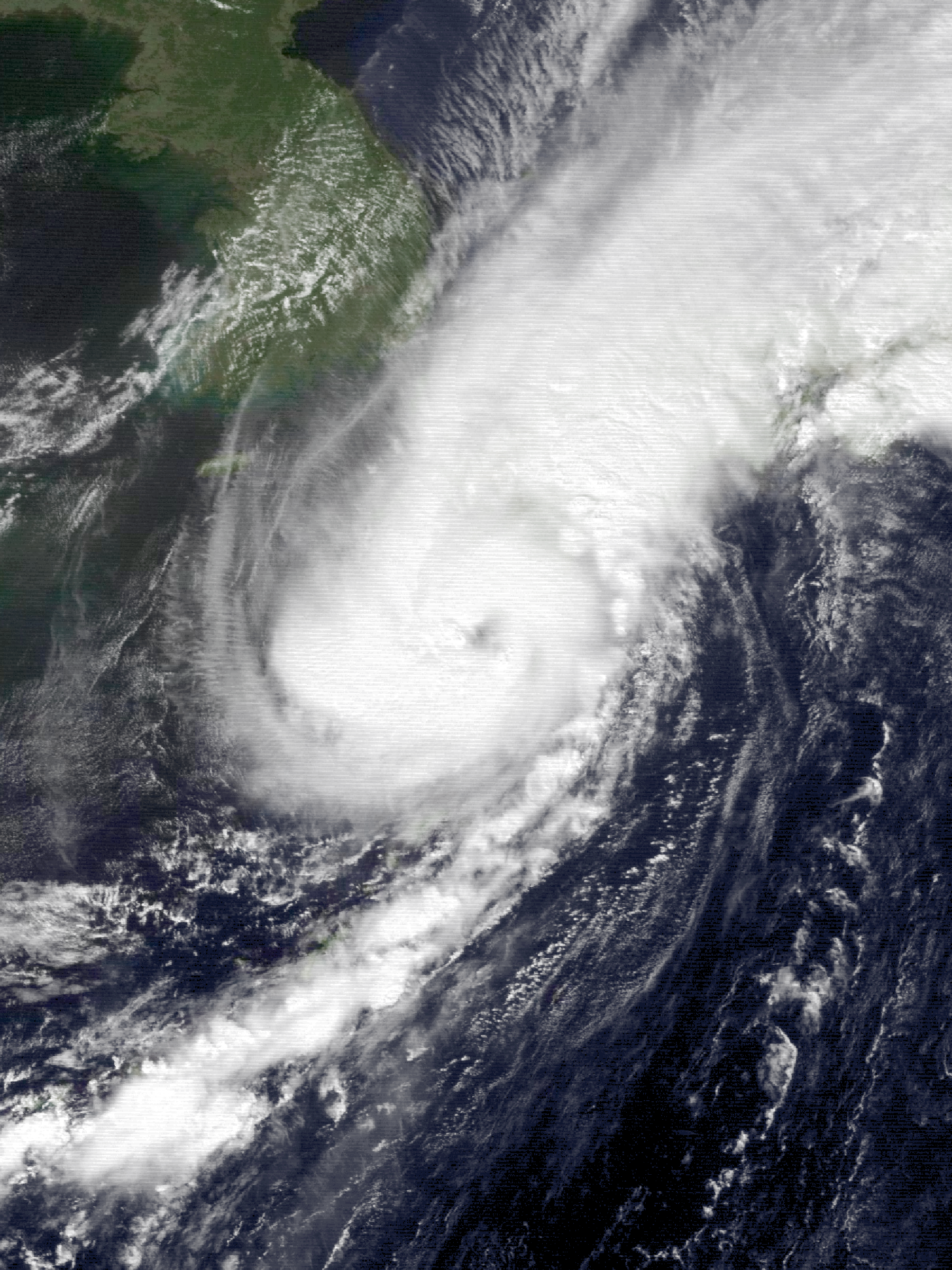
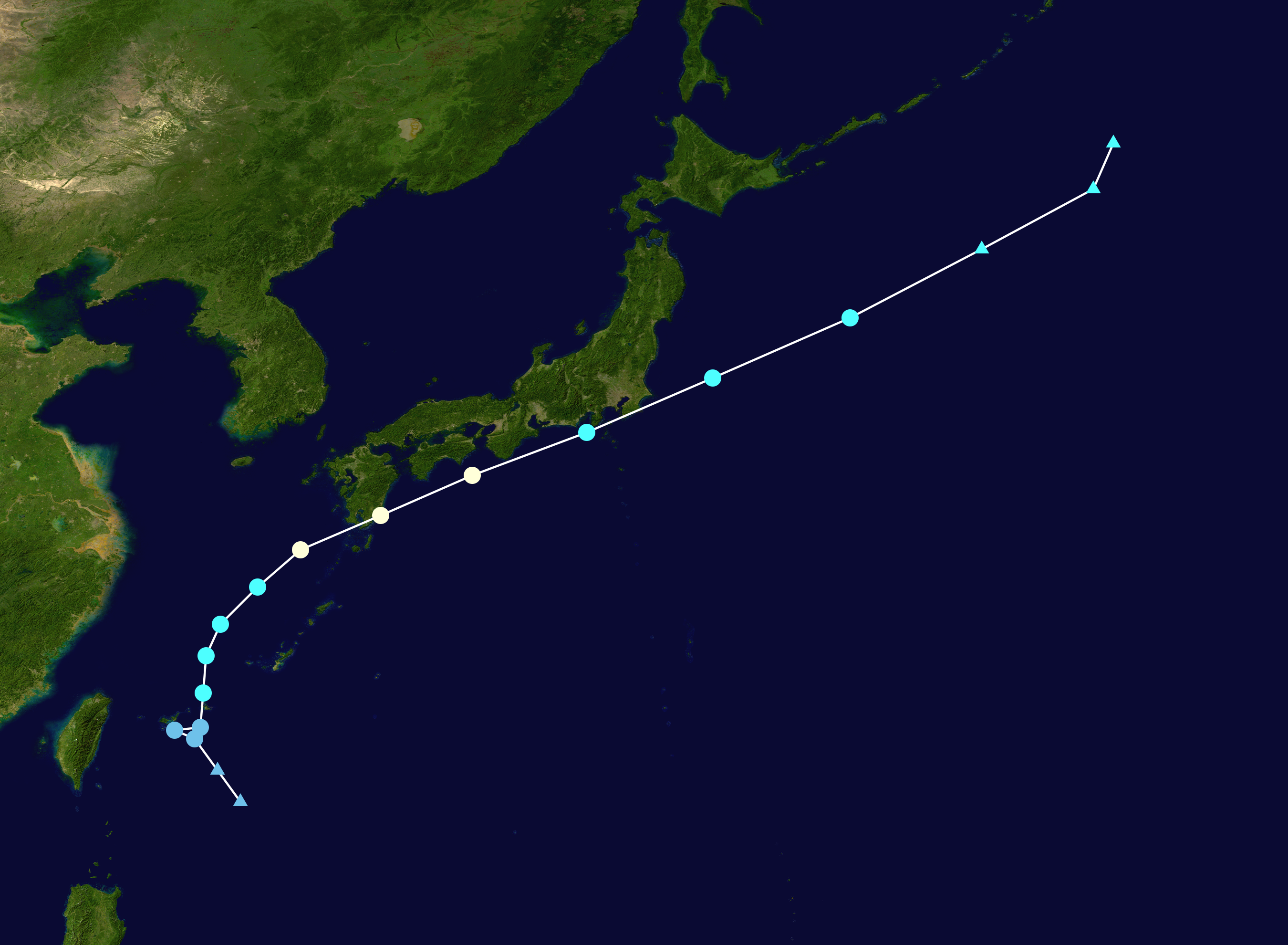
- Duration: September 17 – September 20
- Peak intensity: 130 km/h (80 mph) (10-min); 970 hPa (mbar)

Typhoon Wayne formed from a depression on September 17 about 100 miles (160 km) southwest of Okinawa. Tropical Storm Wayne was named the next day and into a typhoon on September 19. Wayne reached peak intensity of 75 mph (121 km/h) before beginning to accelerate toward the northeast. Typhoon Wayne skimmed the southeastern island of Japan while weakening into a tropical storm.

Throughout Japan, Wayne produced rainfall in excess of 200 mm (7.9 in), peaking at 313 mm (12.3 in), that triggered flash flooding and mudslides. In parts of Kōchi Prefecture, rainfall rates reached 83 mm (3.3 in) per hour. According to Japanese Police, the storm caused 166 mudslides and affected 33 of the country's 47 prefectures. Eight people were killed by the storm, including three children who drowned after falling into a swollen river. A total of 247 homes were destroyed and another 5,824 were damaged. Losses totaled to ¥16.5 million (US$117,000).

=== Typhoon Angela (Rubing) ===
- Very strong typhoon (JMA)
- Category 4 super typhoon (SSHWS)
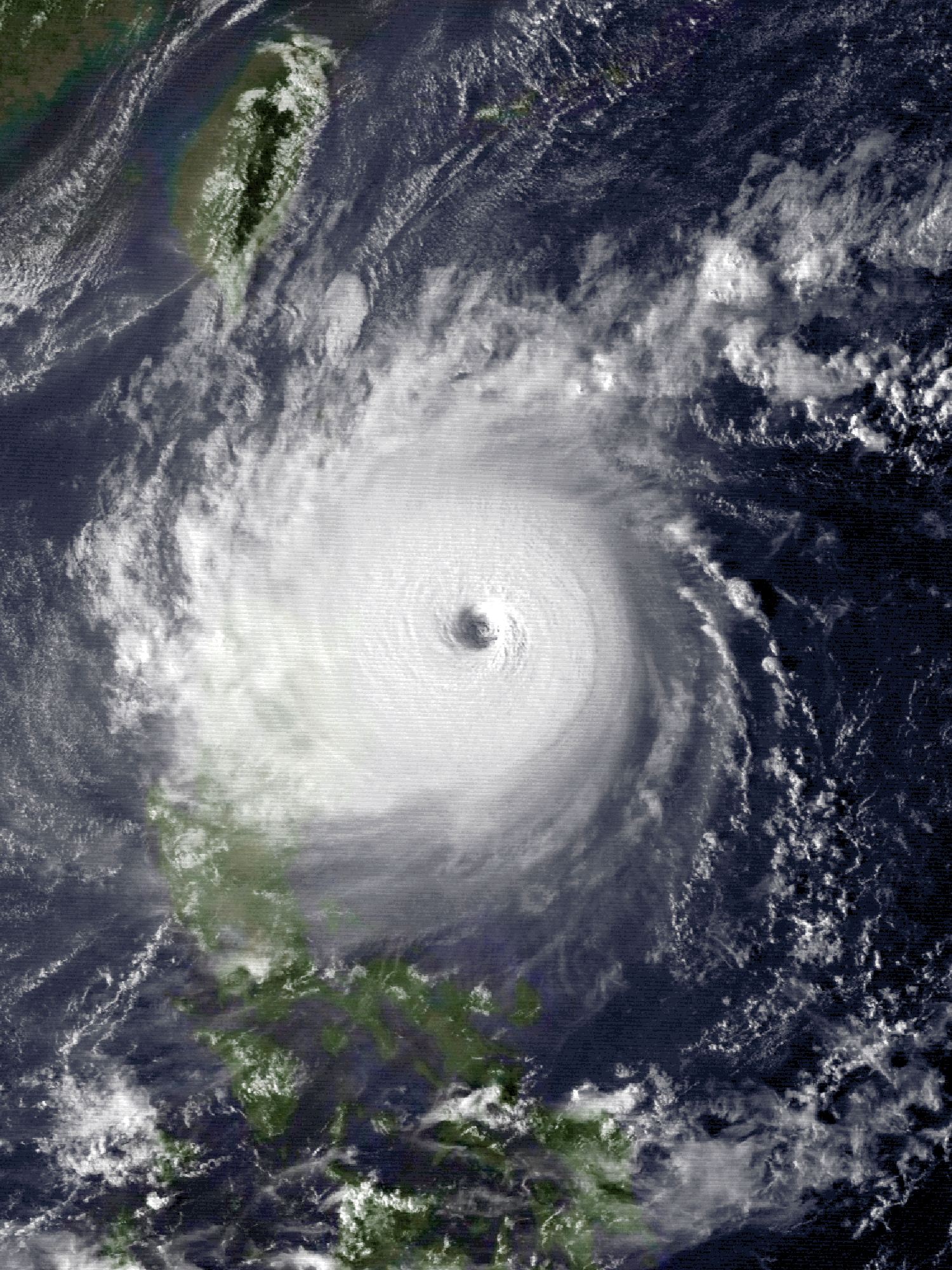
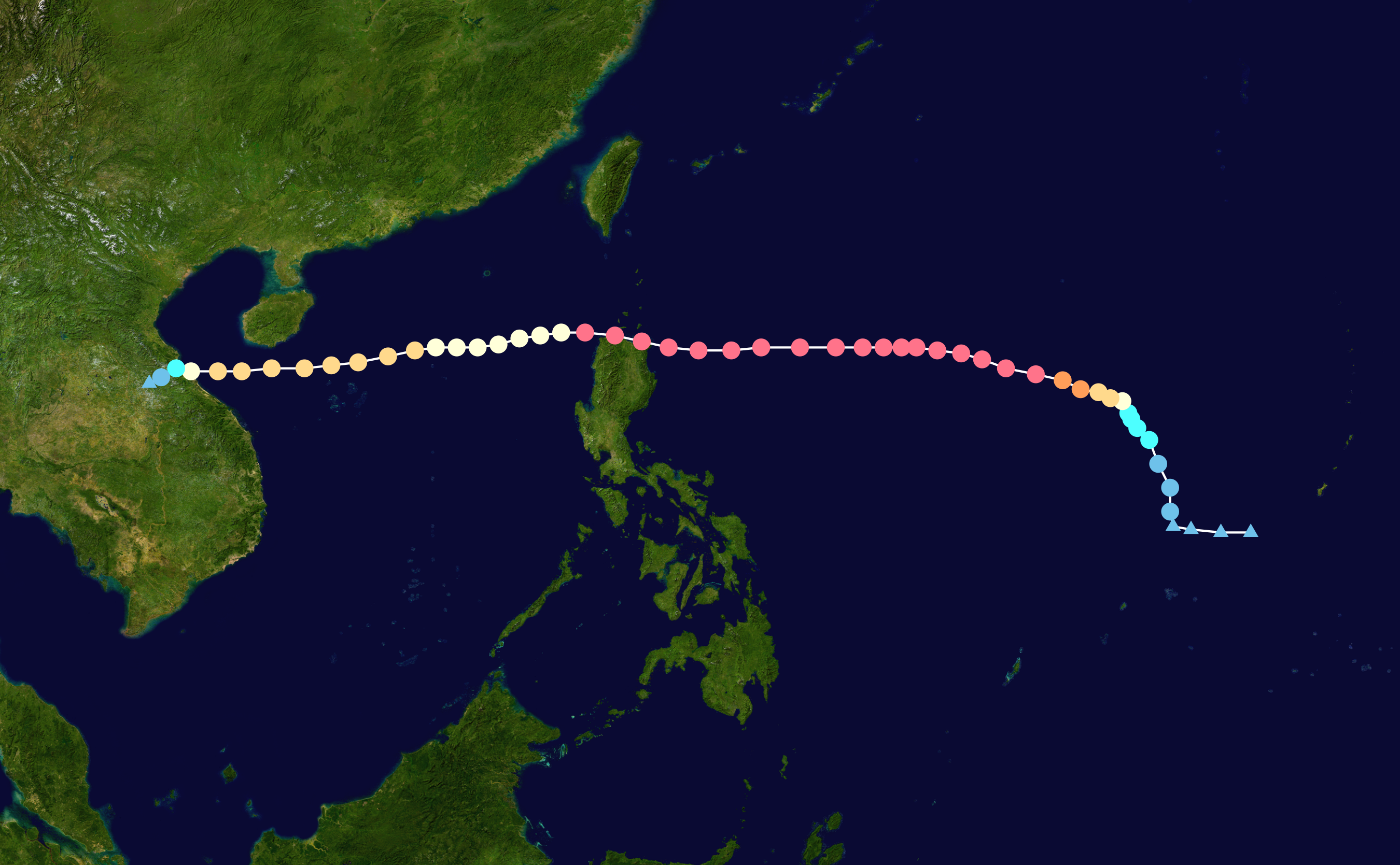
- Duration: September 28 – October 10
- Peak intensity: 175 km/h (110 mph) (10-min); 925 hPa (mbar)

The first in a series of tropical cyclones to develop within the monsoon trough, Angela was first identified as a tropical depression on September 28. Initially, a shortwave trough caused the system to move north-northwest; however, once this feature moved away from Angela, the cyclone acquired a general westward track. Developing dual outflow channels on October 1, Angela rapidly intensified into a Category 4 equivalent typhoon. After maintaining its strength for four days, the storm intensified into a super typhoon on October 5 with peak winds estimated at 240 km/h (150 mph). At this time, the JMA assessed Angela to have attained ten-minute winds of 175 km/h (110 mph) and a minimum pressure of 925 mbar (hPa; 27.32 inHg). Later that day, the storm skirted the northern coast of Luzon before moving into the South China Sea. Considerable weakening took place due to the interaction with the Philippines and the system was slow to re-organize. In response to a ridge over China, Angela turned to the west-southwest. On October 9, the storm brushed the southern coast of Hainan Island before making landfall near Huế, Vietnam. Once onshore, Angela rapidly dissipated and was last noted during the afternoon of October 10.

Throughout northern Luzon, high winds and heavy rains from the typhoon destroyed 14,064 homes and damaged 19,245 more. Angela was the deadliest in the series of storms to strike the Philippines with 119 fatalities; another 28 people were reported missing. Total economic losses from the storm reached $8 million. Significant damage took place on Hainan Island and in Vietnam but specifics are unknown due to the rapid succession of storms.

=== Typhoon Brian ===
- Typhoon (JMA)
- Category 1 typhoon (SSHWS)
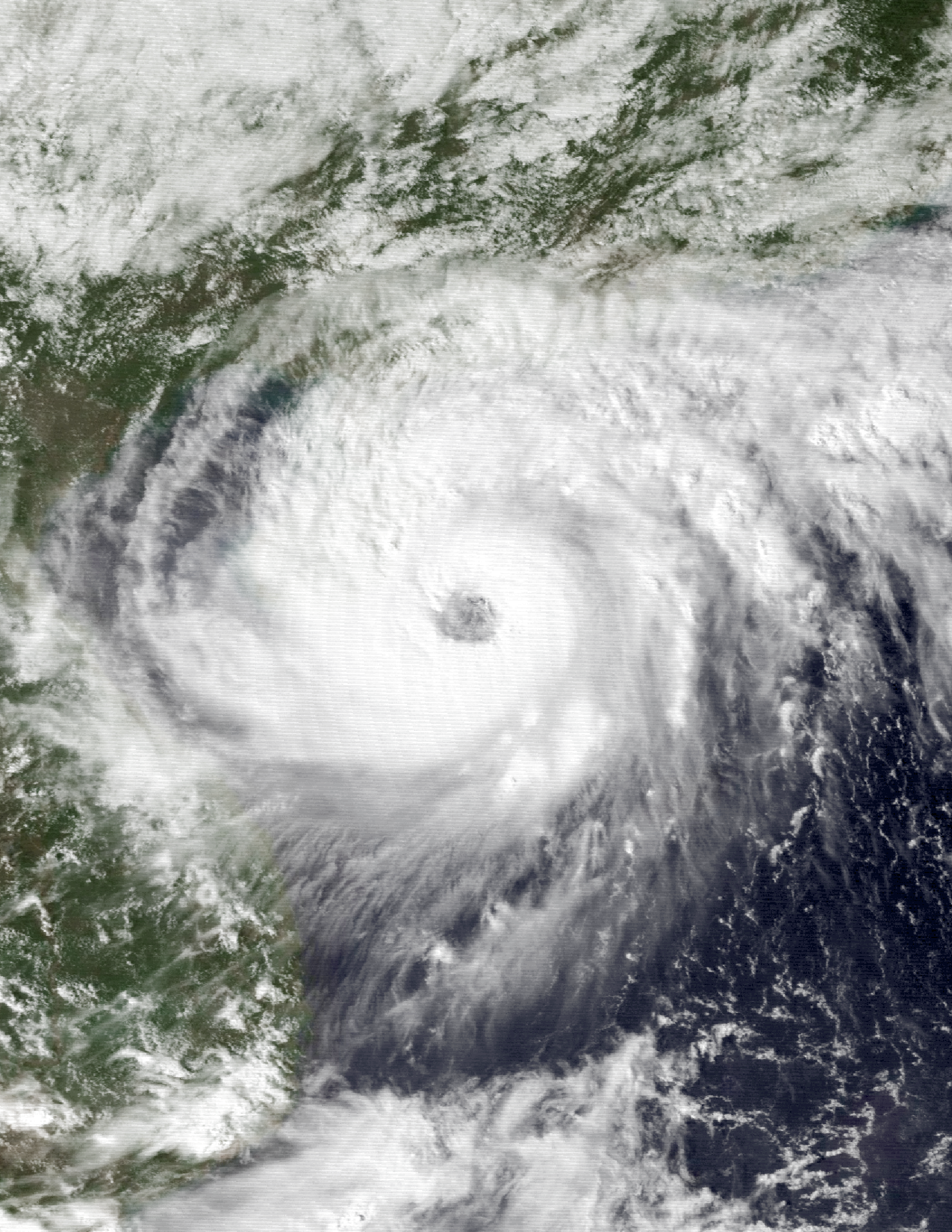
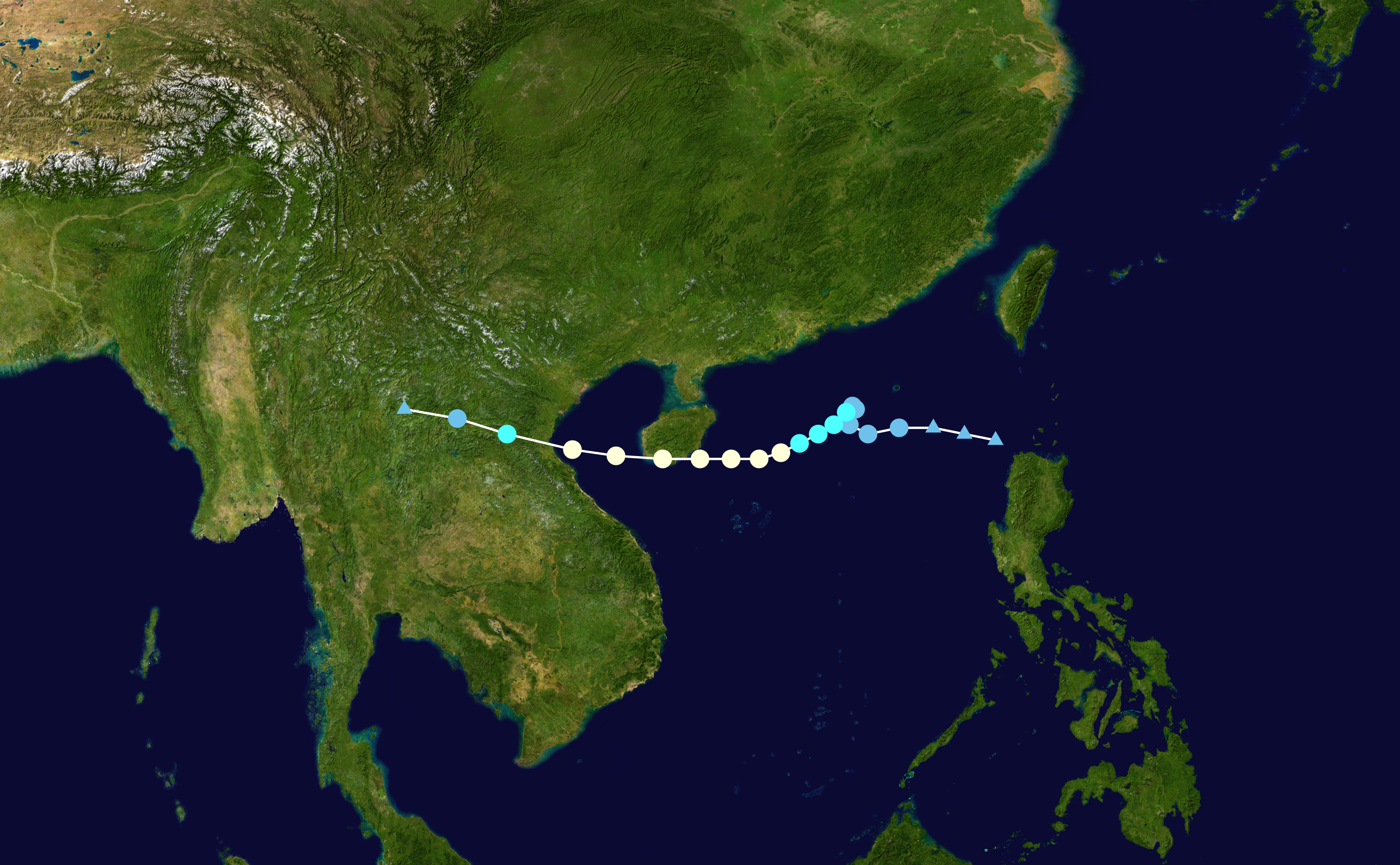
- Duration: September 28 – October 3
- Peak intensity: 120 km/h (75 mph) (10-min); 970 hPa (mbar)

Originating from an area of low pressure associated with a monsoon trough in late-September, Brian quickly organized into a tropical storm over the South China Sea. Tracking along a general west-southwest to westerly course, the storm attained typhoon status on October 1 before making landfall along the southern coast of Hainan Island the following day. After briefly crossing land, the storm moved into the Gulf of Tonkin and ultimately struck Vietnam on October 3 before dissipating the next day over Laos.

Across Hainan Island, Brian caused extensive damage to property and infrastructure. Nearly 185,000 homes were damaged or destroyed by the storm's high winds or flash flooding. Communications were severely disrupted as 2,800 km (1,700 mi) of power and telephone lines were downed. Brian killed 40 people and inflicted 837 million Renminbi (US$222 million) in damage throughout Hainan before striking Vietnam and causing further damage. Significant losses were reported in Vietnam as well; however, the rapid succession of Brian and two other typhoons made it difficult to differentiate the losses caused by each storm.

=== Typhoon Colleen ===
- Typhoon (JMA)
- Category 1 typhoon (SSHWS)
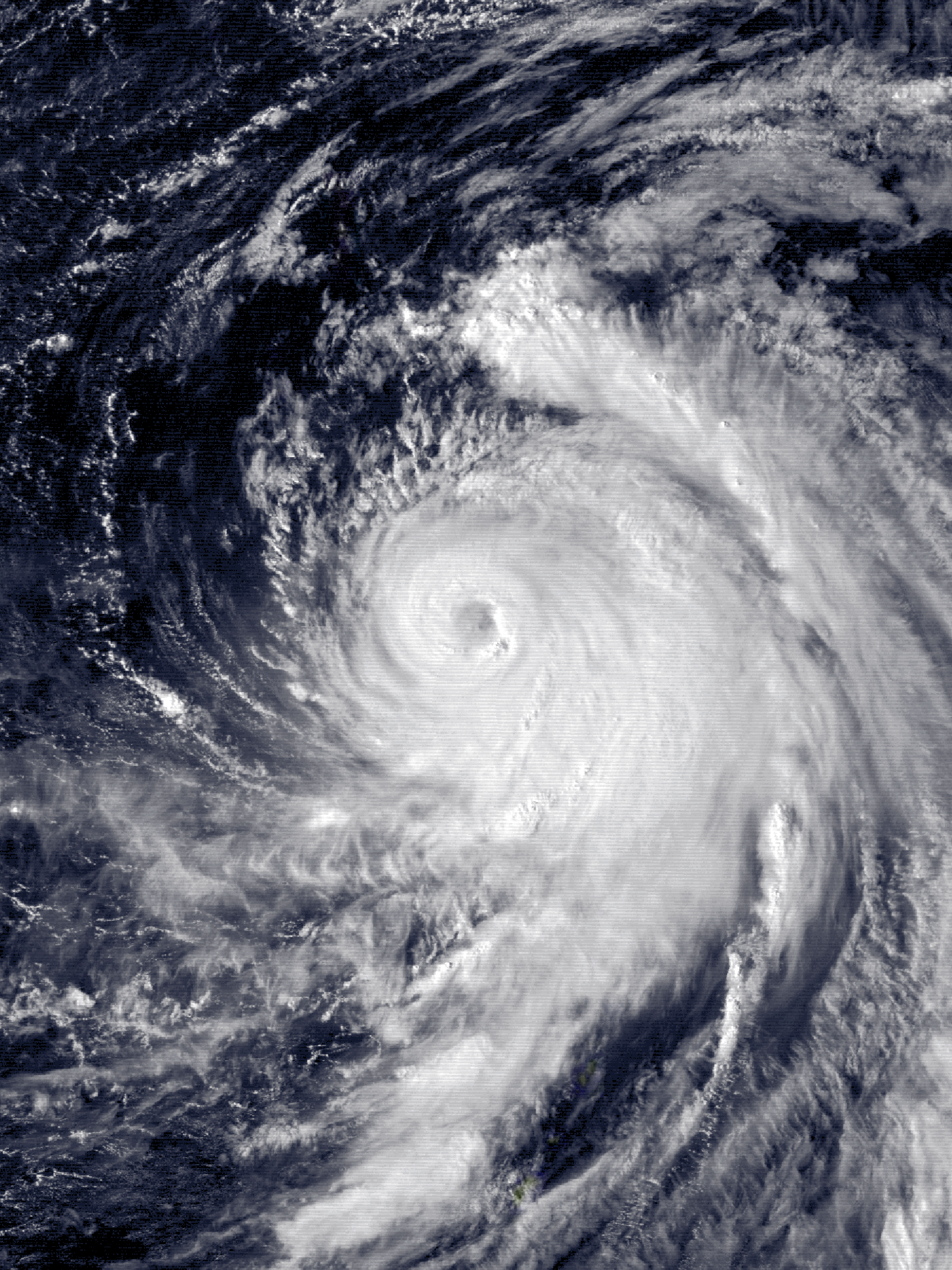
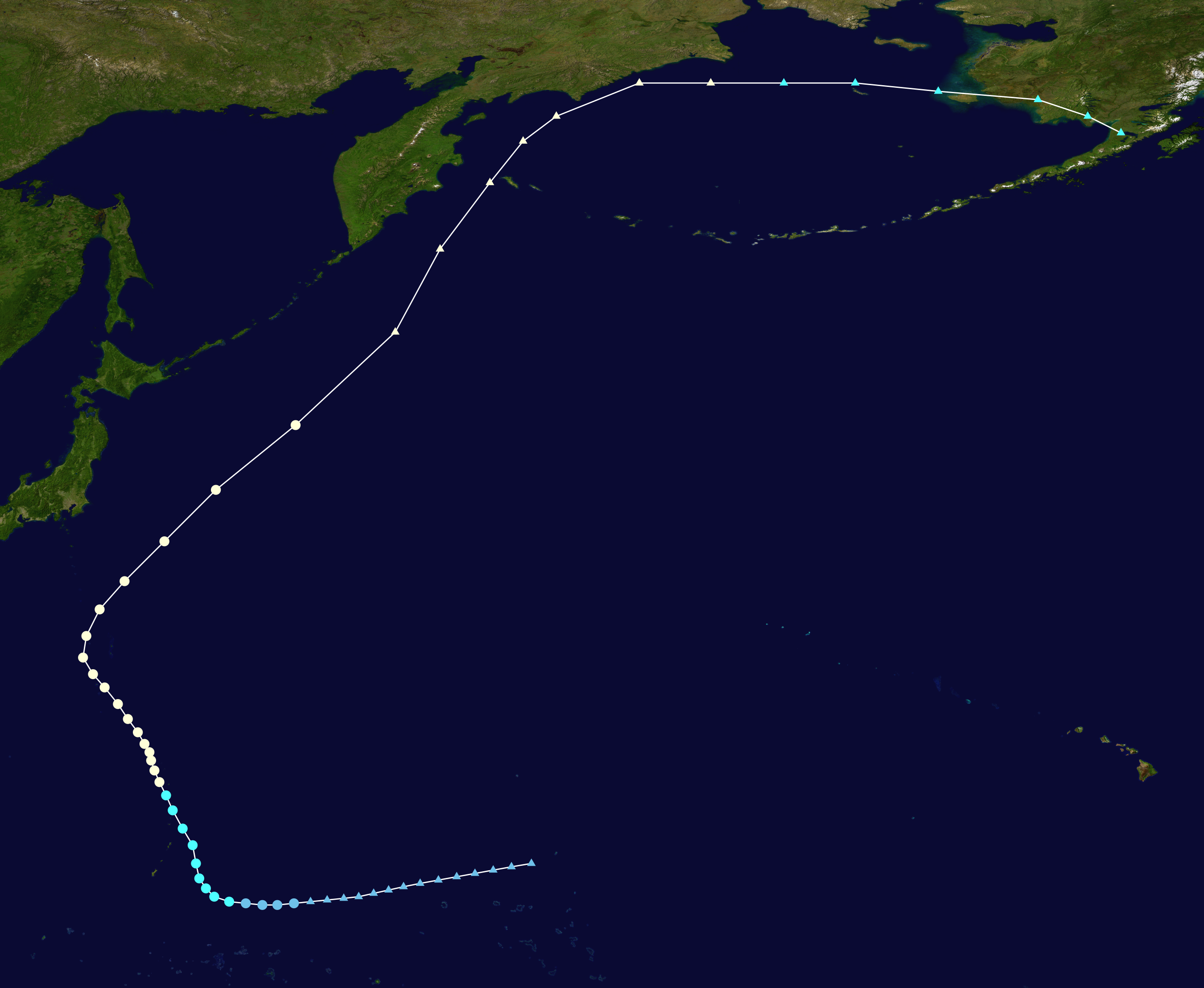
- Duration: October 1 – October 8
- Peak intensity: 150 km/h (90 mph) (10-min); 950 hPa (mbar)

On October 2, a tropical storm warning was issued for Guam and the Northern Mariana Islands as Colleen approached. As a precautionary measure, U.S. military installations relocated aircraft to Japan and sent ships to sea to ride out the storm.

=== Typhoon Dan (Saling) ===
- Typhoon (JMA)
- Category 1 typhoon (SSHWS)
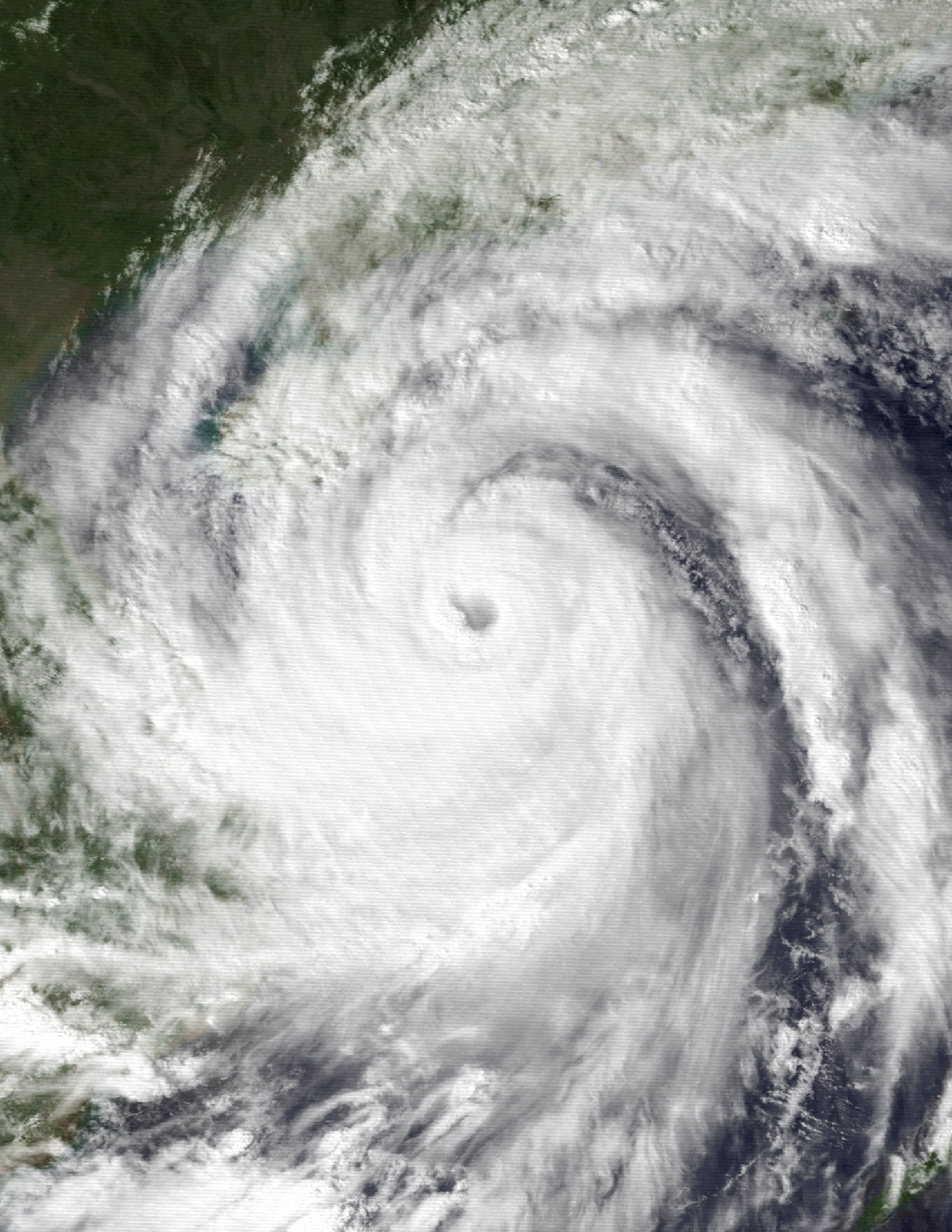
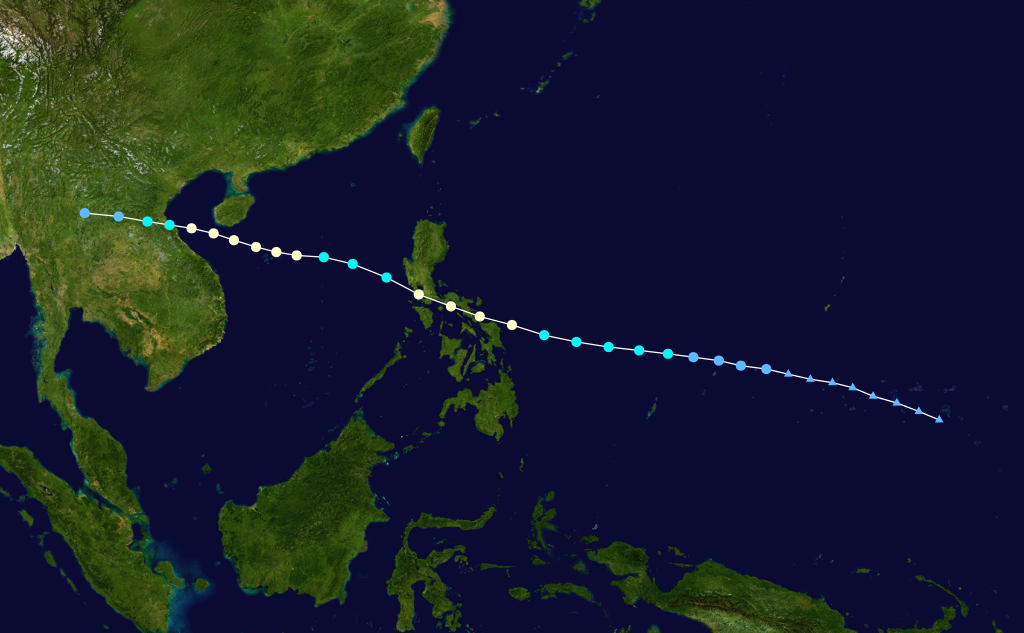
- Duration: October 6 – October 13
- Peak intensity: 140 km/h (85 mph) (10-min); 960 hPa (mbar)

The second of three typhoons to strike Vietnam in October, Dan developed on October 6, and tracked generally westward throughout its course. Initially, intensification was somewhat limited due to its proximity to Typhoon Angela; however, by October 9 conditions became more favorable and Dan attained typhoon status. After crossing the Philippines, the typhoon emerged into the South China Sea and reached its peak intensity, with sustained 10-minute winds of 140 km/h (85 mph) and a minimum barometric pressure of 960 mbar (hPa; 28.35 inHg). After brushing the southern coast of Hainan Island, a weakened Dan made landfall in northern Vietnam before dissipating on October 13.

The storm caused extensive damage throughout its course. In the Philippines, Dan left more than 232,000 homeless and killed 58 people. Though not the strongest in the series of typhoons to affect the Philippines, Dan was the costliest with total economic losses reaching $59.2 million. Roughly 95 percent of Metro Manila was left without power and some areas remained in the dark for weeks. Across Vietnam, heavy rains from Dan exacerbated ongoing floods and caused further damage to areas recovering from Typhoons Angela and Brian. Approximately 130,000 hectares (320,000 acres) of land was flooded by the storm.

=== Typhoon Elsie (Tasing) ===
- Very strong typhoon (JMA)
- Category 5 super typhoon (SSHWS)
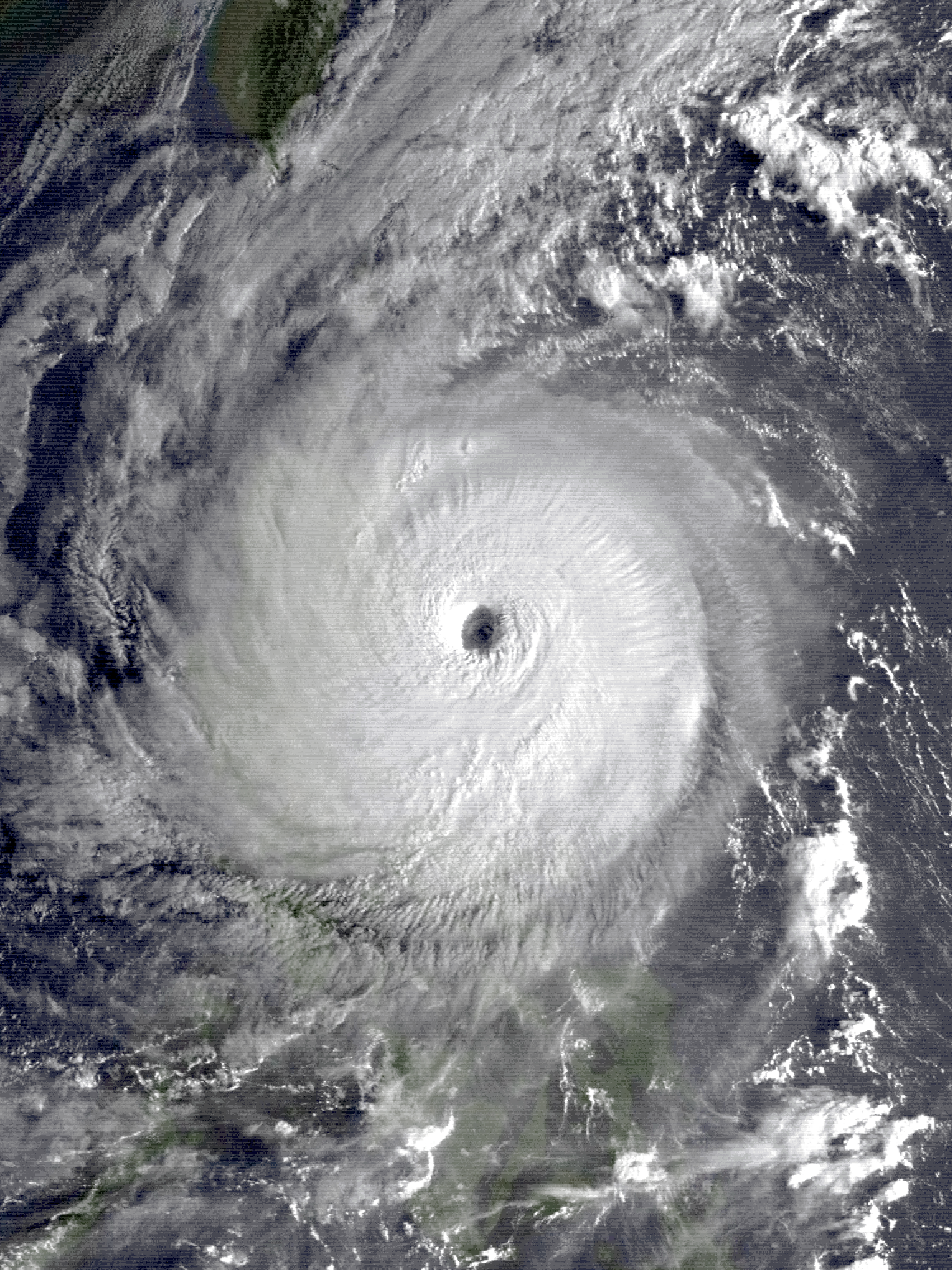
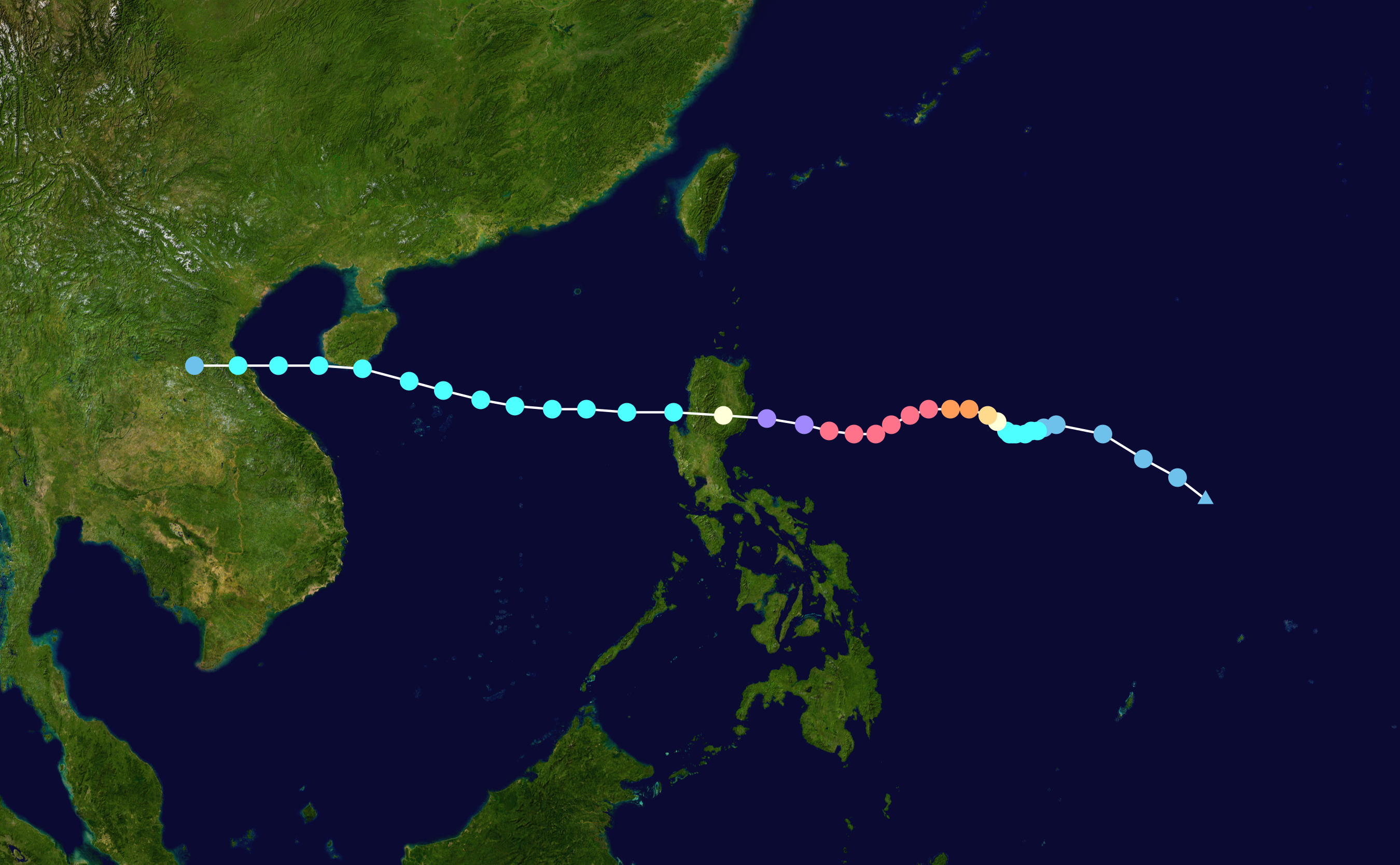
- Duration: October 13 – October 22
- Peak intensity: 185 km/h (115 mph) (10-min); 915 hPa (mbar)

A powerful Category 5 super typhoon, Elsie formed out of a tropical disturbance on October 13, and initially moved relatively slowly in an area of weak steering currents. On October 15, the storm underwent a period of rapid intensification, attaining an intensity that corresponds to a Category 3 hurricane on the Saffir–Simpson hurricane scale. After taking a due west track towards the northern Philippines, the storm intensified further, becoming a Category 5 super typhoon hours before making landfall in Luzon. After moving inland, the typhoon rapidly weakened to a tropical storm. Once back over water in the South China Sea, wind shear prevented re-intensification. Elsie eventually made landfall in Vietnam on October 22 and dissipated the following day over Laos.

In the Philippines, Elsie worsened the situation already left in the wakes of typhoons Angela and Dan. Although it was stronger than the previous two, Elsie caused far less damage due to the relatively sparse population in the area of landfall. During the storm's passage, 47 people were killed and another 363 were injured. Damages throughout the country amounted to $35.4 million and roughly 332,000 people were left homeless.

=== Typhoon Forrest ===
- Very strong typhoon (JMA)
- Category 2 typhoon (SSHWS)
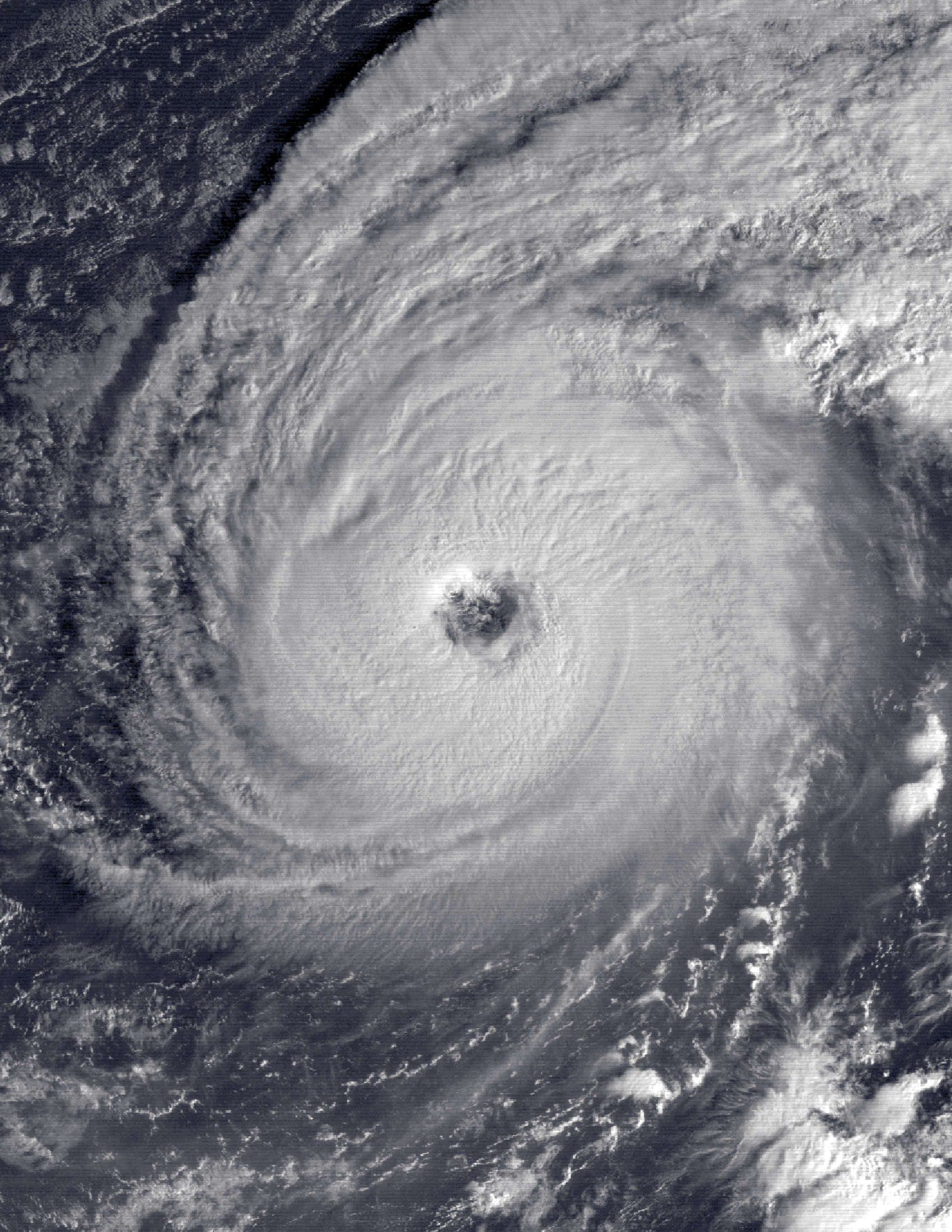
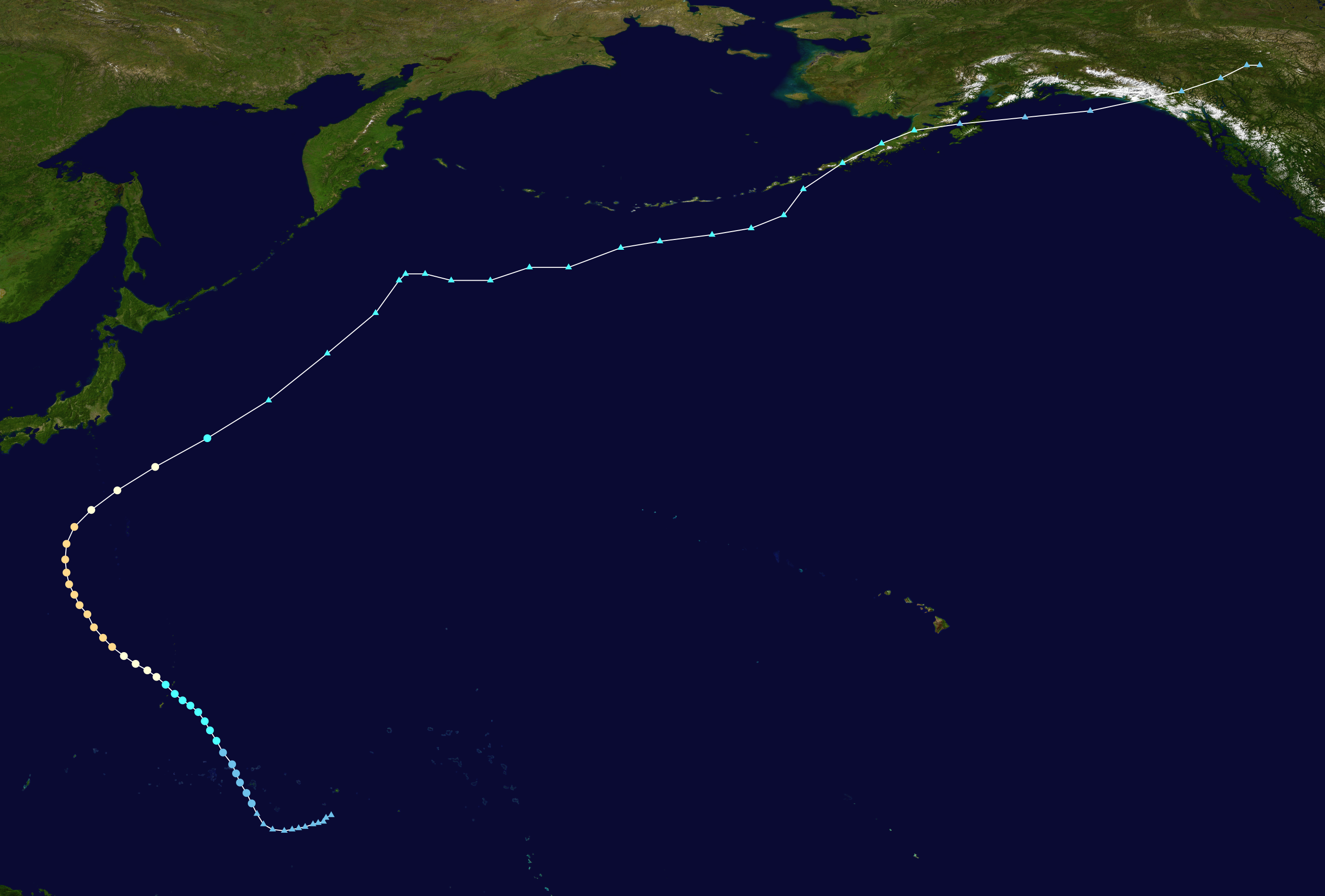
- Duration: October 18 – October 30
- Peak intensity: 155 km/h (100 mph) (10-min); 940 hPa (mbar)

The last of the tropical cyclones in October and the 17th typhoon of the year, Forrest was slow to develop initially near the Marshall Islands as it was a large cyclone. Once it passed Guam by only 85 mi (137 km), it intensified into a typhoon, with maximum sustained winds peaking at 95 knots (109 mph). Tree limbs and power lines were downed as the system pulled away from Saipan. It then recurved, accelerating northeast to become of the strongest extratropical cyclones in the Pacific Ocean that year.

=== Typhoon Gay ===
- Very strong typhoon (JMA)
- Category 3 typhoon (SSHWS)
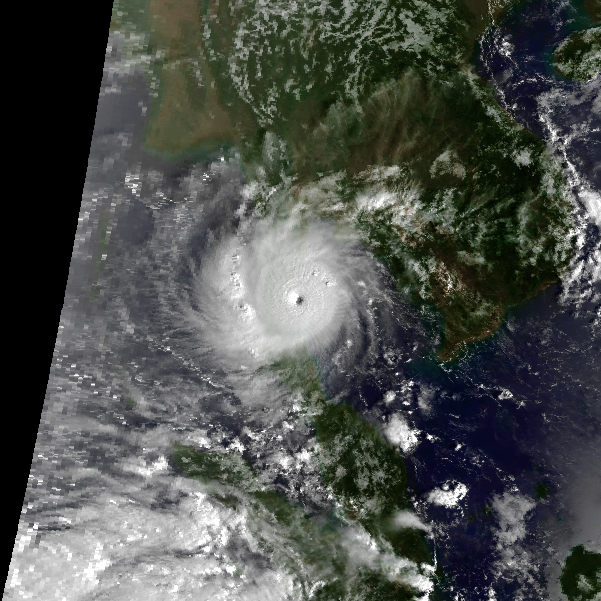
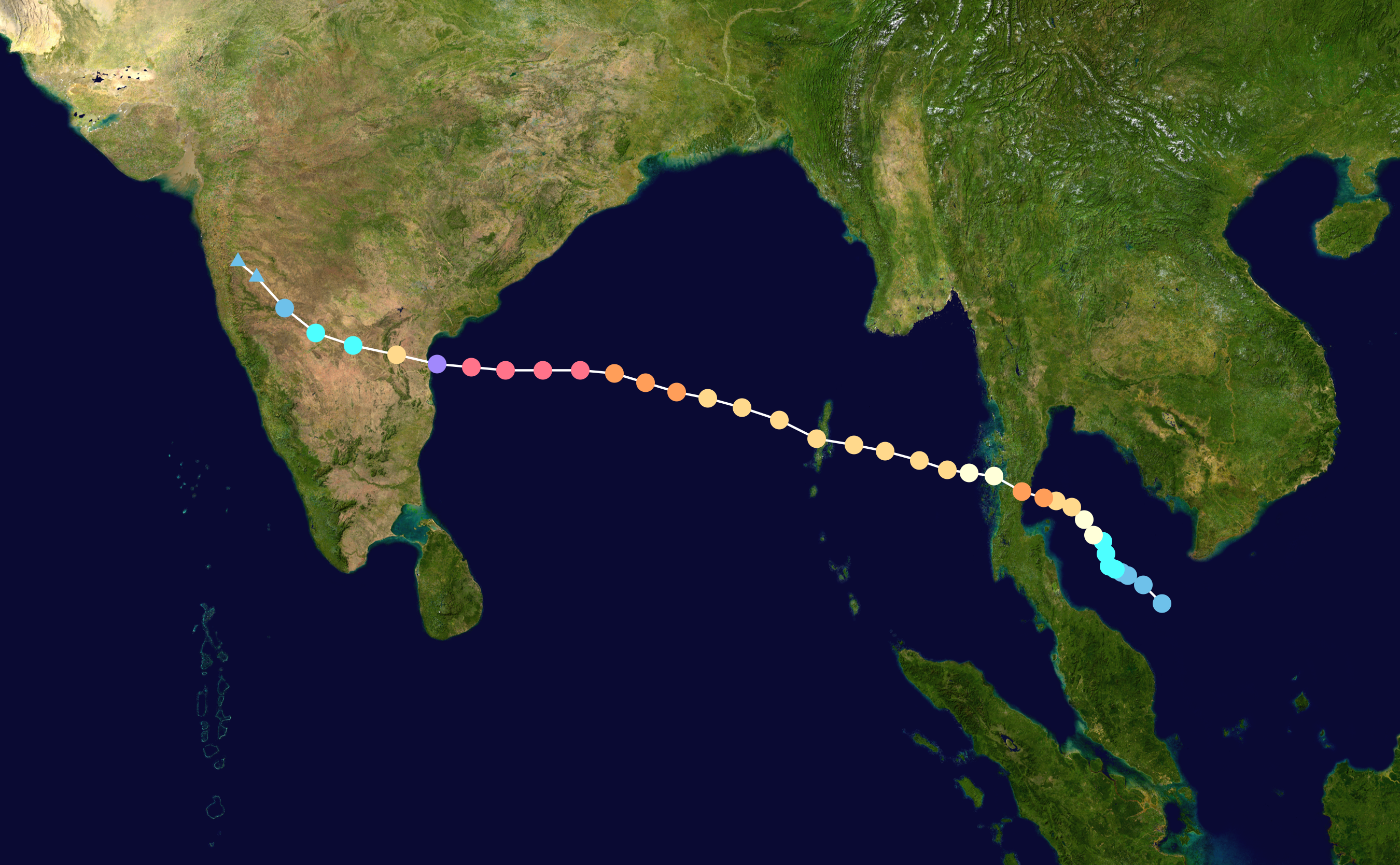
- Duration: November 1 – November 4 (Exited basin)
- Peak intensity: 165 km/h (105 mph) (10-min); 960 hPa (mbar)

Typhoon Gay, also known as Super Cyclonic Storm Gay or the Kavali Cyclone of 1989, was a small but powerful tropical cyclone which caused more than 800 fatalities in and around the Gulf of Thailand in November 1989. The worst typhoon to affect the Malay Peninsula in thirty-five years, Gay originated from a monsoon trough over the Gulf of Thailand in early November. Owing to favorable atmospheric conditions, the storm rapidly intensified, attaining winds over 120 km/h (75 mph) by 3 November. (Note: All sustained wind speeds are based on one-minute standards unless otherwise stated.) Later that day, Gay became the first typhoon since 1891 to make landfall in Thailand, striking Chumphon Province with winds of 185 km/h (115 mph). The small storm emerged into the Bay of Bengal and gradually reorganized over the following days as it approached southeastern India. On 8 November, Gay attained its peak intensity as a Category 5-equivalent cyclone with winds of 260 km/h (160 mph). The cyclone then moved ashore near Kavali, Andhra Pradesh. Rapid weakening ensued inland, and Gay dissipated over Maharashtra early on 10 November.

The typhoon's rapid development took hundreds of vessels by surprise, leading to 275 offshore fatalities. Of these, 91 occurred after an oil drilling ship, the Seacrest, capsized amid 6–11 m (20–36 ft) swells. Across the Malay Peninsula, 588 people died from various storm-related incidents. Several towns in coastal Chumphon were destroyed. Losses throughout Thailand totaled ฿11 billion (US $497 million). (Note: All damage figures in the article are in 1989 United States dollars (USD) unless otherwise stated.) Striking India as a powerful cyclone, Gay damaged or destroyed about 20,000 homes in Andhra Pradesh, leaving 100,000 people homeless. In that country, 69 deaths and ₹410 million (US $25.3 million) in damage were attributed to Gay.

=== Typhoon Hunt (Unsing) ===
- Typhoon (JMA)
- Category 2 typhoon (SSHWS)
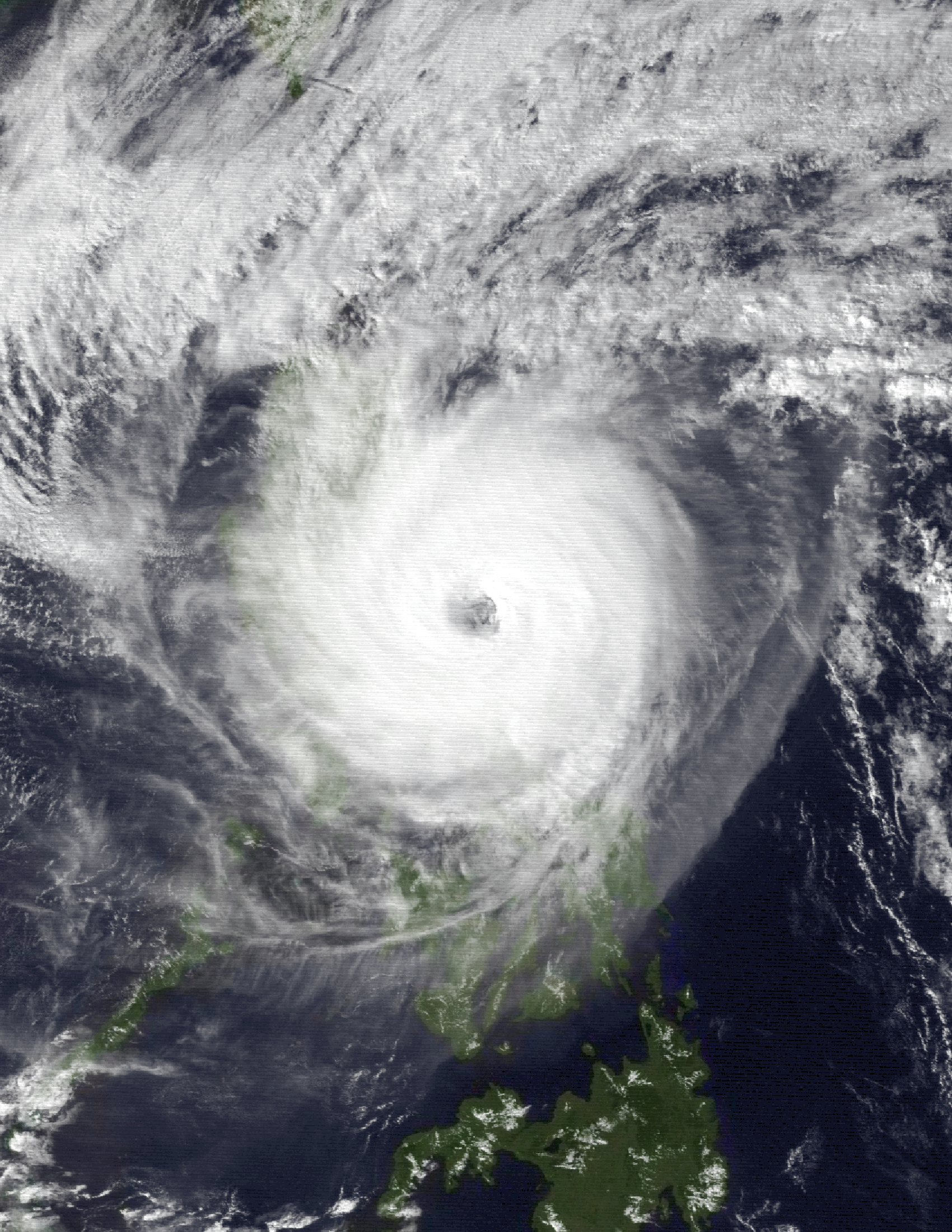
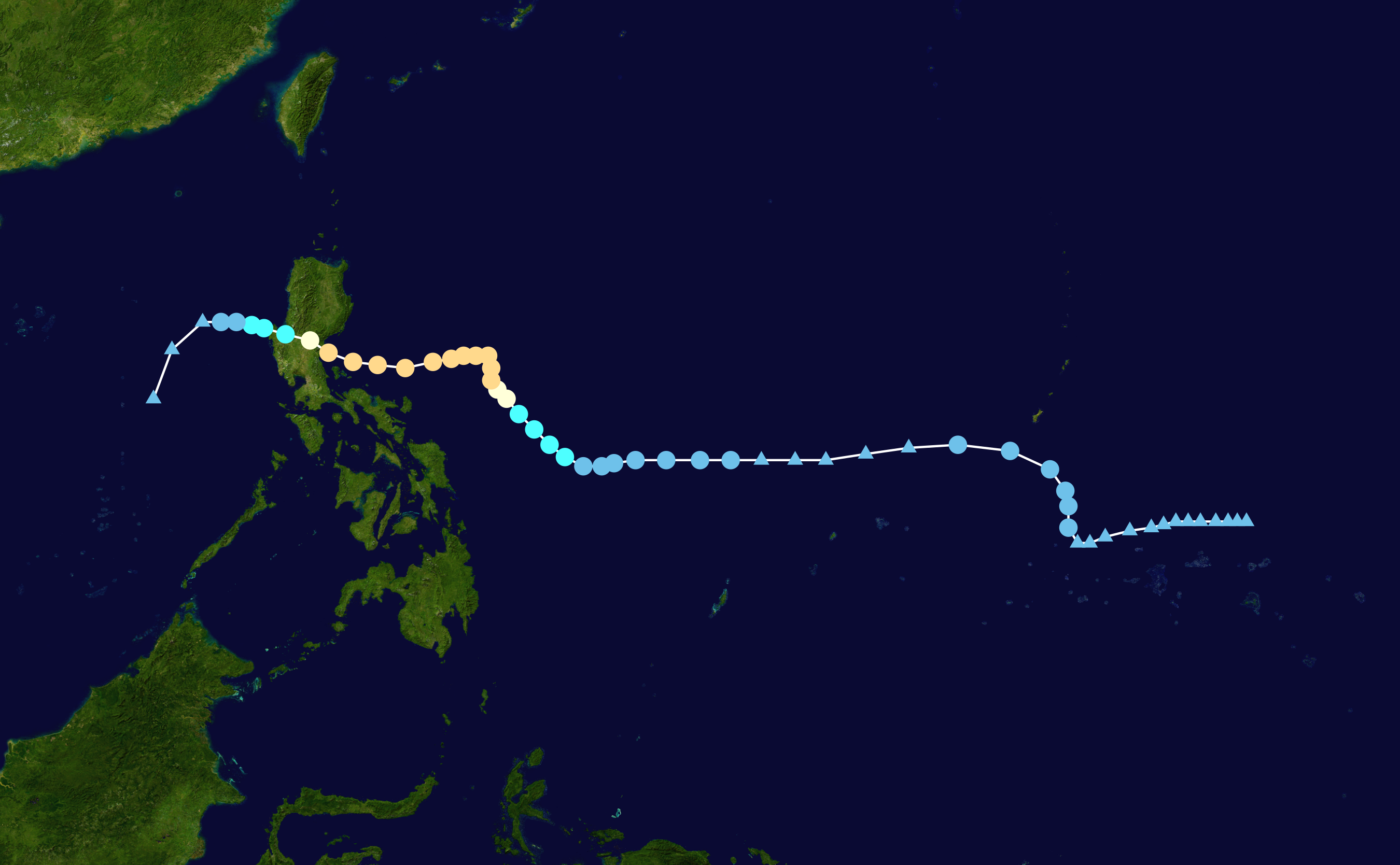
- Duration: November 16 – November 23
- Peak intensity: 140 km/h (85 mph) (10-min); 960 hPa (mbar)

A tropical disturbance began to organize and a tropical depression formed east of the Philippines on November 16. As the depression moved towards the northwest it strengthened into Tropical Storm Hunt which rapidly intensified becoming a typhoon while moving towards the northwest. Typhoon Hunt reached peak intensity of 105 mph (169 km/h) just before turning due west towards the Philippines. Hunt maintained peak intensity until landfall on central Luzon Island. Seven people were killed and minor damage occurred to U.S. Military operations. After departing the Philippines Hunt was downgraded and dissipated in the South China Sea.

Offshore, large swells produced by the storm sank a boat off the coast of Quezon Province, killing six people. These waves also swept away 60 homes in the coastal communities of Catarman and Biri, leaving 948 people homeless. A total of 212 homes were destroyed and 3,401 more were damaged. Overall, 11 people were killed in the Philippines and damage reached 8 million pesos (US$350,000). Additionally, approximately 1,500 people were left homeless.

=== Typhoon Irma (Walding) ===
- Very strong typhoon (JMA)
- Category 5 super typhoon (SSHWS)
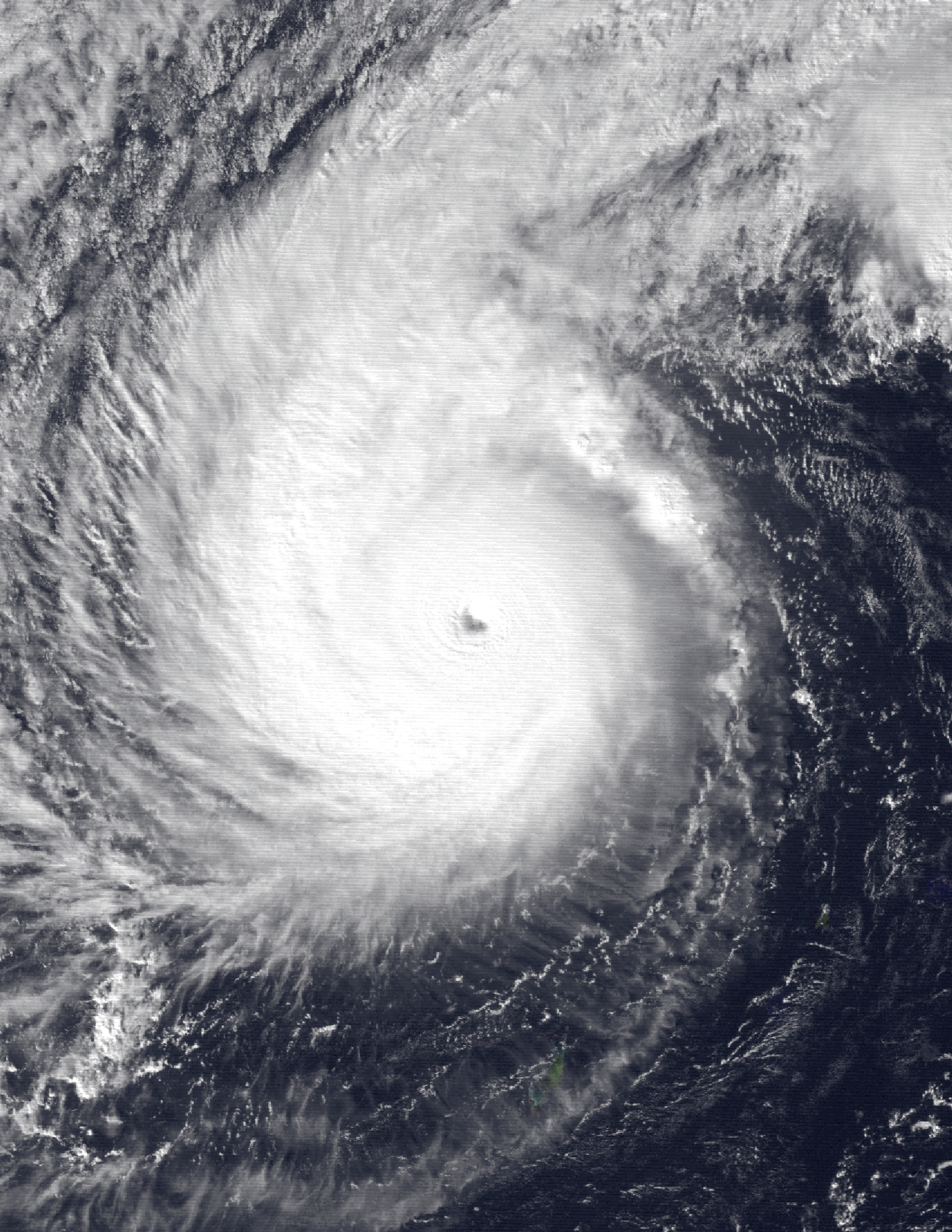
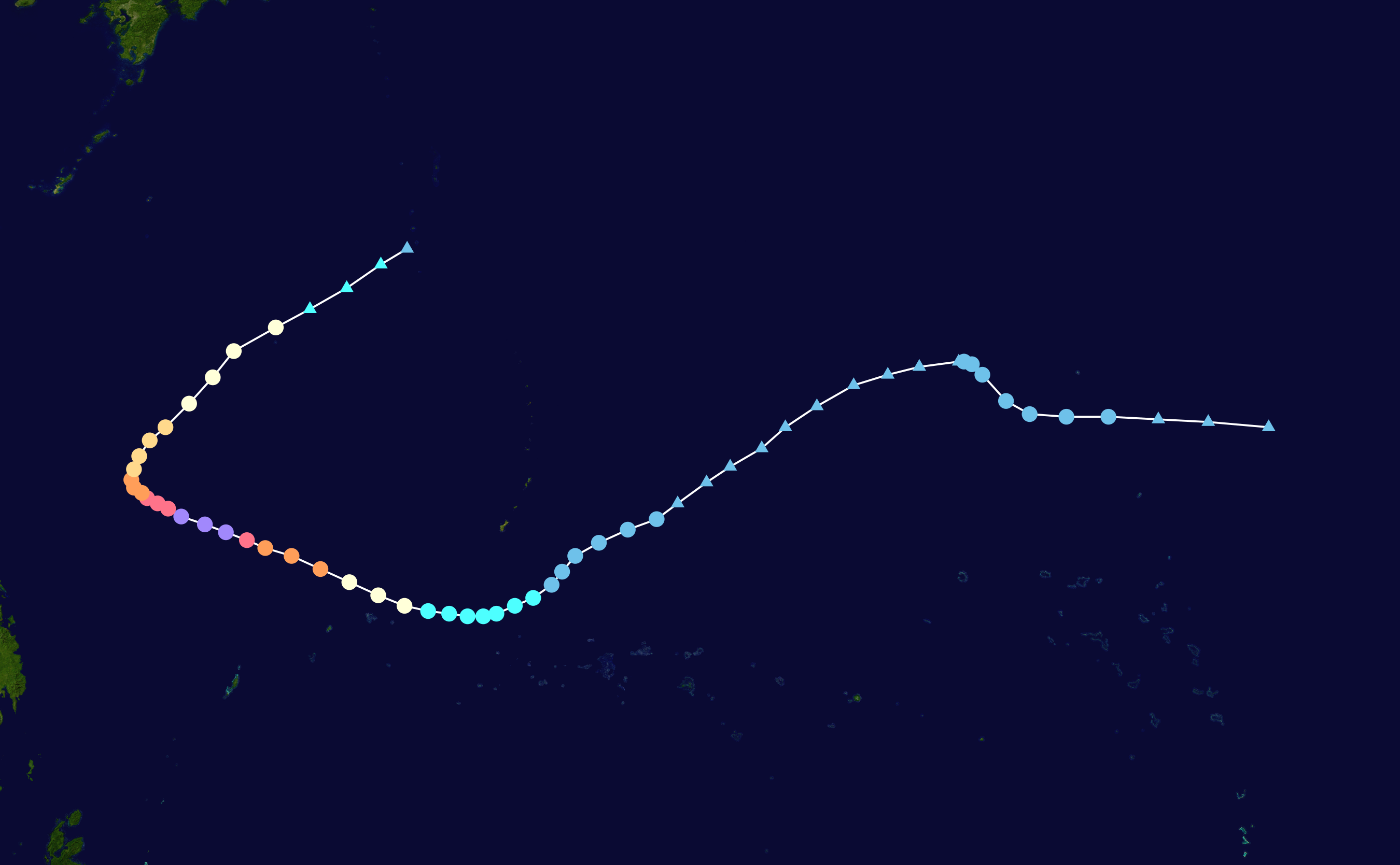
- Duration: November 21 – December 4
- Peak intensity: 175 km/h (110 mph) (10-min); 925 hPa (mbar)

Typhoon Irma formed on November 21 as a minimal cyclone. Irma did not intensify at first, as it moved over lukewarm waters for most of its early life. But as it moved over warm waters, it rapidly intensified to a strong typhoon. The storm intensified from a category 1 to a category 3 in less than 2 1/2 days, and rapidly intensified from a Category 3 to a Category 5 in 12 hours. Then, Irma began to weaken as it traveled over very cool waters near the Philippines. Irma then weakened and dissipated two days later on December 4.

=== Tropical Depression 35W ===
- Tropical depression (SSHWS)
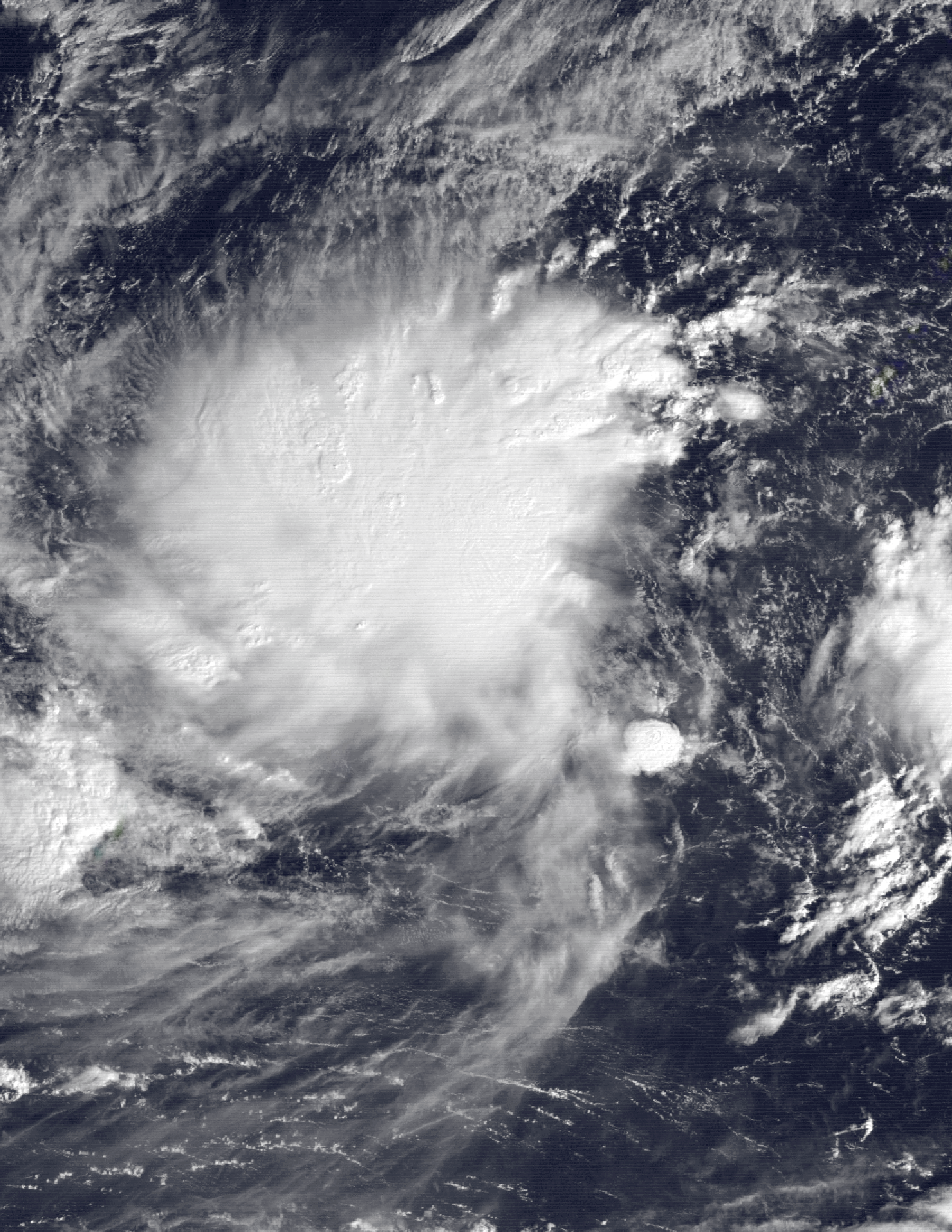
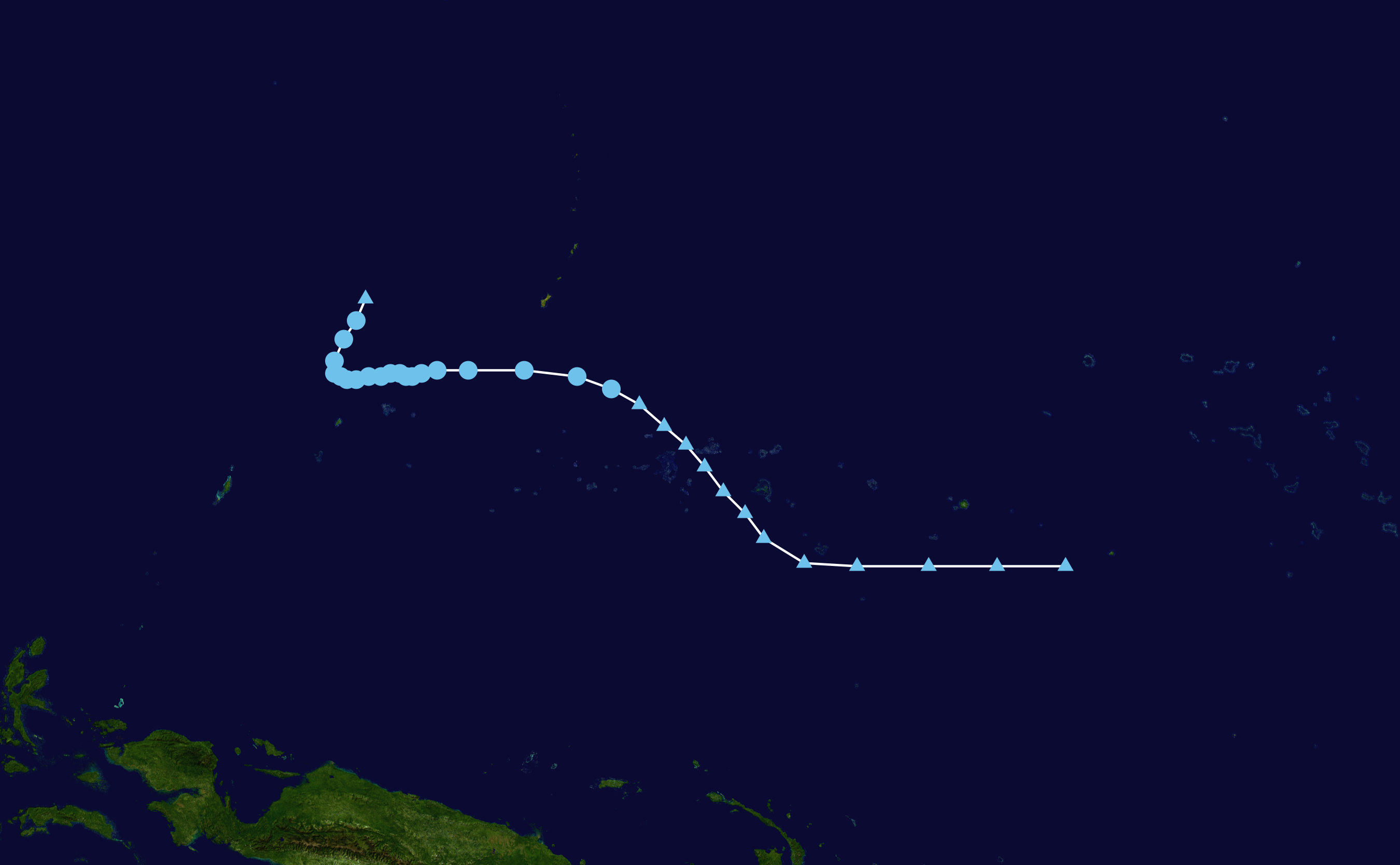
- Duration: December 1 – December 9
- Peak intensity: 55 km/h (35 mph) (1-min); 1000 hPa (mbar)

This strong Tropical Depression did not affect land much as it lasted for eight days, mostly churning in open ocean.

=== Typhoon Jack ===
- Very strong typhoon (JMA)
- Category 4 typhoon (SSHWS)
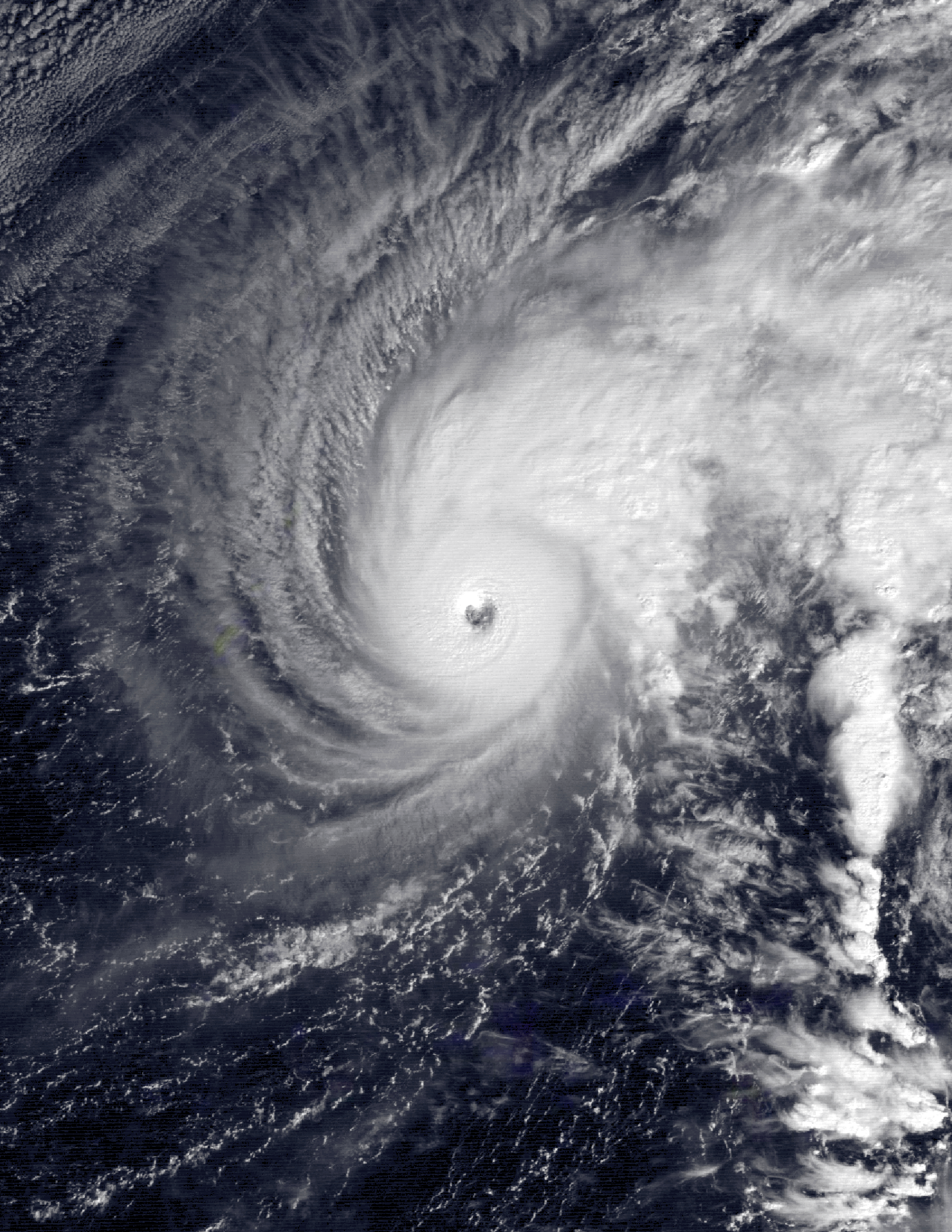
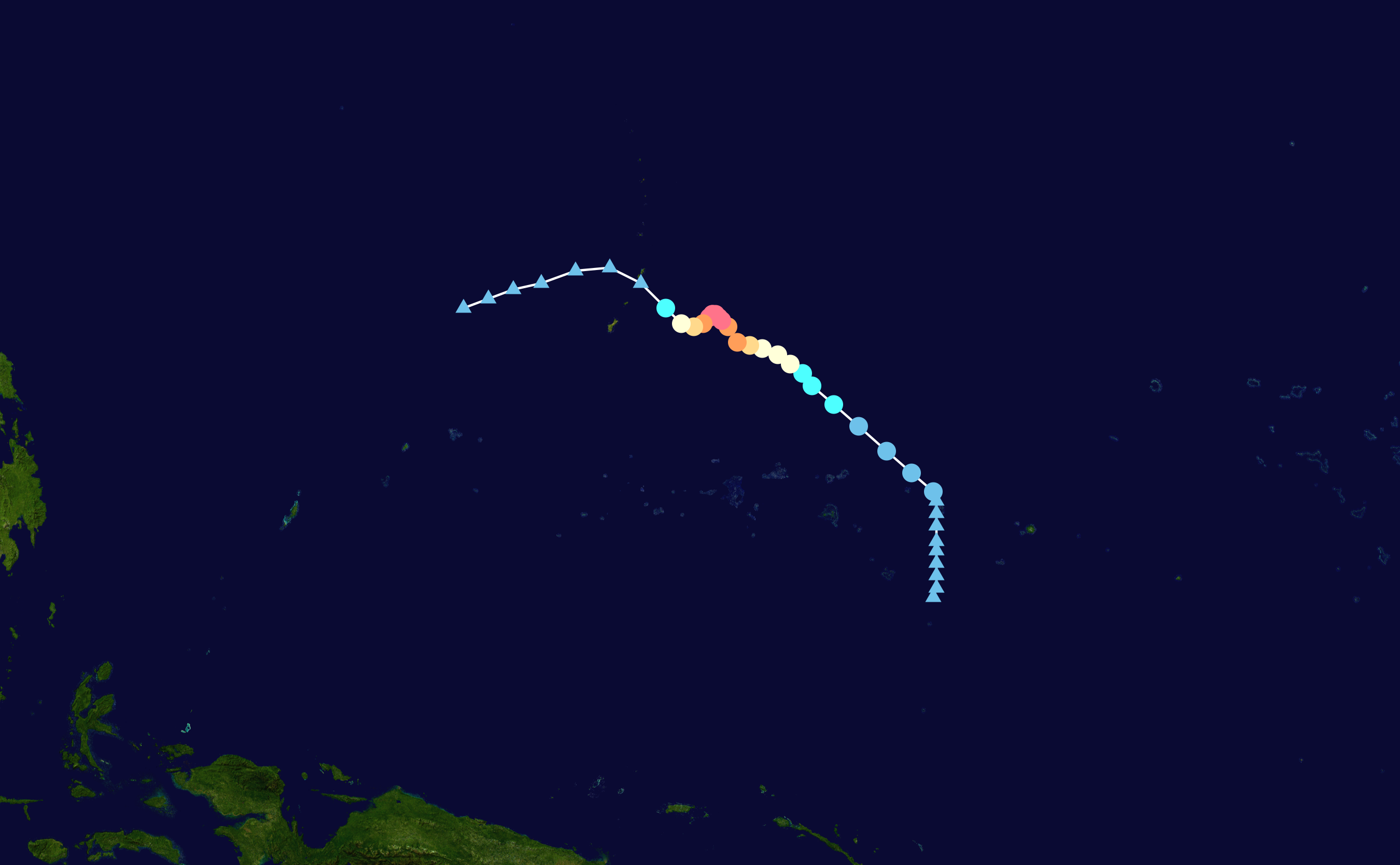
- Duration: December 21 – December 27
- Peak intensity: 175 km/h (110 mph) (10-min); 925 hPa (mbar)

Typhoon Jack was the twenty-first typhoon and final tropical cyclone of the year. The disturbance that became Jack was first identified by the Joint Typhoon Warning Center (JTWC) on December 21 as a broad area of poorly organized convection about 240 nmi (444 km; 276 mi) southeast of Truk. A Tropical Cyclone Formation Alert was issued late on December 22, and the JTWC began issuing warnings on Tropical Depression 36W at 00:00 UTC on December 23. The system strengthened into Tropical Storm Jack six hours later while moving northwestward toward the Mariana Islands. The Royal Observatory in Hong Kong separately analyzed Jack as having developed into a tropical depression on December 22, about 1,400 km (870 mi) east-southeast of Guam.

Jack became a typhoon on December 24 while approximately 590 km (367 mi) east of Guam. Forecasts initially expected the cyclone to recurve through a weakness in the subtropical ridge, but the broad ridge prevented this and left Jack in an area of weak steering currents. The cyclone then underwent rapid intensification. The Japan Meteorological Agency (JMA) estimated that Jack reached maximum 10-minute sustained winds of 95 kn (176 km/h; 109 mph) and a minimum pressure of 925 hPa (27.32 inHg) early on December 26. The JTWC estimated a substantially higher peak of 125 kn (232 km/h; 144 mph) in one-minute sustained winds between 18:00 UTC on December 25 and 12:00 UTC on December 26, equivalent to a Category 4 typhoon on the Saffir–Simpson scale.

Jack approached to within about 185 nmi (343 km; 213 mi) of Guam before becoming nearly stationary. Its proximity allowed prolonged surveillance by weather radar at Andersen Air Force Base. Radar observations indicated that Jack moved only about 60 nmi (111 km; 69 mi) between the morning of December 25 and early December 27, including less than 20 nmi (37 km; 23 mi) during one 24-hour period. Its eye was estimated to be 20 to 30 nmi (37 to 56 km; 23 to 35 mi) in diameter.

Because Jack remained nearly stationary for almost 48 hours, the JTWC anticipated that upwelling of cooler water beneath the cyclone would cause rapid weakening. The subsequent collapse was more extreme than forecast: the JTWC reduced Jack's estimated winds from 105 kn (194 km/h; 121 mph) at 00:00 UTC on December 27 to an exposed 30 kn (56 km/h; 35 mph) low-level circulation only 24 hours later. The remaining deep convection was displaced about 300 nmi (556 km; 345 mi) south of the original center, and satellite imagery on December 29 detected a cold-water cyclonic ocean eddy where Jack had stalled.

On December 25, a level two tropical cyclone condition of readiness was issued for Guam as Jack stalled about 320 km (199 mi) east of the territory. Residents were advised to obtain emergency supplies, the United States Air Force relocated B-52 bombers to Okinawa, and the United States Navy ordered its large vessels to sea. Banks on Guam were also closed, while officials on Saipan advised residents to stock emergency supplies. Jack remained offshore, and its abrupt weakening on December 27 ended the immediate threat to the Mariana Islands.

=== Other systems ===
In addition to the storms listed above, the China Meteorological Agency also monitored six other tropical depressions.

- June 24–27, 55 km/h (35 mph) 1002 mbar (hPa; 29.59 inHg)
- August 9–12, 55 km/h (35 mph) 1000 mbar (hPa; 29.53 inHg)
- August 18–22, 45 km/h (30 mph) 1002 mbar (hPa; 29.59 inHg)
- August 19–23, 55 km/h (35 mph) 1005 mbar (hPa; 29.68 inHg)
- December 5–6, 55 km/h (35 mph) 1002 mbar (hPa; 29.59 inHg)
- December 8–9, 55 km/h (35 mph) 1002 mbar (hPa; 29.59 inHg)

== Storm names ==
During the season 32 named tropical cyclones developed in the Western Pacific and were named by the Joint Typhoon Warning Center, when it was determined that they had become tropical storms. These names were contributed to a revised list which started in 1979. However the JTWC changed their naming list during half-way of 1989, starting with the name Angela.

Winona	Andy	Brenda	Cecil	Dot	Ellis	Faye	Gordon	Hope	Irving	Judy	Ken	Lola	Mac	Nancy	Owen
Peggy	Roger	Sarah	Tip	Vera	Wayne	Angela	Brian	Colleen	Dan	Elsie	Forrest	Gay	Hunt	Irma	Jack

=== Philippines ===
Atring	Bining	Kuring	Daling	Elang
Goring	Huling	Ibiang	Luming	Miling
Narsing	Openg	Pining	Rubing	Saling
Tasing	Unsing	Walding	Yeyeng	
Auxiliary list
				Anding (unused)
Binang (unused)	Kadiang (unused)	Dinang (unused)	Epang (unused)	Gundang (unused)

The Philippine Atmospheric, Geophysical and Astronomical Services Administration uses its own naming scheme for tropical cyclones in their area of responsibility. PAGASA assigns names to tropical depressions that form within their area of responsibility and any tropical cyclone that might move into their area of responsibility. Should the list of names for a given year prove to be insufficient, names are taken from an auxiliary list, the first 6 of which are published each year before the season starts. Names not retired from this list will be used again in the 1993 season. This is the same list used for the 1985 season. PAGASA uses its own naming scheme that starts in the Filipino alphabet, with names of Filipino female names ending with "ng" (A, B, K, D, etc.). Names that were not assigned/going to use are marked in gray.

== Season effects ==
This is a table of all of the storms that have formed in the 1989 Pacific typhoon season. It includes their duration, names, affected areas, damages, and death totals. Deaths in parentheses are additional and indirect (an example of an indirect death would be a traffic accident), but were still related to that storm. Damage and deaths include totals while the storm was extratropical, a wave, or a low, and all of the damage figures are in 1989 USD. Names listed in parentheses were assigned by PAGASA.

Name	Dates	Peak intensity			Areas affected	Damage (USD)	Deaths	Ref(s).
Name	Dates	Category	Wind speed	Pressure	Areas affected	Damage (USD)	Deaths	Ref(s).
Winona	January 15–21	Tropical storm	65 km/h (40 mph)	1,000 hPa (29.53 inHg)	Wake Island, Mariana Islands, Caroline Islands	None	None	
Atring	January 26–28	Tropical depression	Not specified	1,006 hPa (29.71 inHg)	Philippines	$5 million	61	
Andy	April 17–25	Very strong typhoon	185 km/h (115 mph)	920 hPa (27.17 inHg)	Caroline Islands, Mariana Islands	None	None	
Brenda (Bining)	May 15–21	Typhoon	120 km/h (75 mph)	970 hPa (28.64 inHg)	Philippines, South China	$2.86 million	104	
Cecil	May 22–26	Severe tropical storm	110 km/h (70 mph)	975 hPa (28.79 inHg)	Vietnam, Laos, Thailand	$71.7 million	751	
TD	June 3	Tropical depression	Not specified	1,006 hPa (29.71 inHg)	None	None	None	
Dot (Kuring)	June 4–12	Typhoon	150 km/h (95 mph)	955 hPa (28.20 inHg)	Philippines, South China, Vietnam	$45.1 million	8	
Ellis (Daling)	June 20–24	Severe tropical storm	95 km/h (60 mph)	985 hPa (29.09 inHg)	Japan	None	None	
TD	June 25–26	Tropical depression	Not specified	1,004 hPa (29.65 inHg)	None	None	None	
Faye (Elang)	July 6–11	Severe tropical storm	100 km/h (60 mph)	980 hPa (28.94 inHg)	Philippines, South China	None	None	
Gordon (Goring)	July 11–19	Very strong typhoon	185 km/h (115 mph)	915 hPa (27.02 inHg)	Mariana Islands, Philippines, South China	$381 million	306	
Hope (Huling)	July 15–22	Tropical storm	85 km/h (55 mph)	990 hPa (29.23 inHg)	Ryukyu Islands, East China	$340 million	198	
Irving (Ibiang)	July 19–24	Severe tropical storm	100 km/h (60 mph)	985 hPa (29.09 inHg)	Philippines, Vietnam	Unknown	104	
Judy	July 11–19	Typhoon	155 km/h (95 mph)	940 hPa (27.76 inHg)	Japan, Korean Peninsula	$30.7 million	46	
12W (Miling)	July 27–31	Tropical depression	55 km/h (35 mph)	996 hPa (29.41 inHg)	Taiwan	None	None	
Ken-Lola	July 28 – August 7	Severe tropical storm	100 km/h (60 mph)	980 hPa (28.94 inHg)	Ryukyu Islands, China	$129 million	9	
Mac	July 30 – August 8	Typhoon	150 km/h (95 mph)	950 hPa (28.05 inHg)	Japan	$1.81 million	15	
TD	July 31 – August 2	Tropical depression	Not specified	996 hPa (29.41 inHg)	None	None	None	
Owen	August 9–19	Typhoon	140 km/h (85 mph)	960 hPa (28.35 inHg)	Caroline Islands, Mariana Islands	None	None	
TD	August 10–11	Tropical depression	Not specified	1,002 hPa (29.59 inHg)	Vietnam, South China	None	None	
Nancy	August 11–16	Typhoon	130 km/h (80 mph)	965 hPa (28.50 inHg)	Japan	None	None	
Peggy	August 15–19	Tropical storm	65 km/h (40 mph)	996 hPa (29.41 inHg)	Mariana Islands	None	None	
19W	August 16–20	Tropical depression	55 km/h (35 mph)	996 hPa (29.41 inHg)	Ryukyu Islands, Taiwan, East China	None	None	
TD	August 18–23	Tropical depression	Not specified	1,004 hPa (29.65 inHg)	Ryukyu Islands	None	None	
TD	August 19–11	Tropical depression	Not specified	1,008 hPa (29.77 inHg)	None	None	None	
TD	August 19–23	Tropical depression	Not specified	1,008 hPa (29.77 inHg)	None	None	None	
TD	August 22–25	Tropical depression	Not specified	1,008 hPa (29.77 inHg)	South China, Vietnam	None	None	
TD	August 23–25	Tropical depression	Not specified	1,002 hPa (29.59 inHg)	None	None	None	
Roger	August 23–28	Severe tropical storm	100 km/h (60 mph)	980 hPa (28.94 inHg)	Taiwan, Japan	$1.08 million	3	
21W	August 24–28	Tropical storm	65 km/h (40 mph)	1,002 hPa (29.59 inHg)	None	None	None	
TD	August 29–30	Tropical depression	Not specified	1,016 hPa (30.00 inHg)	None	None	None	
TD	August 31 – September 2	Tropical depression	Not specified	1,004 hPa (29.65 inHg)	None	None	None	
TD	September 3–4	Tropical depression	Not specified	1,004 hPa (29.65 inHg)	None	None	None	
TD	September 3–5	Tropical depression	Not specified	1,002 hPa (29.59 inHg)	Japan	None	None	
TD	September 4	Tropical depression	Not specified	1,002 hPa (29.59 inHg)	Japan	None	None	
Sarah (Openg)	September 5–14	Typhoon	150 km/h (95 mph)	950 hPa (28.05 inHg)	Philippines, Taiwan, Ryukyu Islands, China	$175 million	71	
Tip	August 23–28	Severe tropical storm	95 km/h (60 mph)	985 hPa (29.09 inHg)	None	None	None	
TD	September 8	Tropical depression	Not specified	1,002 hPa (29.59 inHg)	Vietnam	None	None	
TD	September 8–9	Tropical depression	Not specified	1,004 hPa (29.65 inHg)	None	None	None	
Vera (Pining)	September 11–16	Severe tropical storm	100 km/h (60 mph)	980 hPa (28.94 inHg)	Ryukyu Islands, Taiwan, East China	$352 million	500	
TD	September 16	Tropical depression	Not specified	1,008 hPa (29.77 inHg)	None	None	None	
Wayne	September 17–20	Typhoon	120 km/h (75 mph)	975 hPa (28.79 inHg)	Japan, South Korea	$117,000	8	
TD	September 17–19	Tropical depression	Not specified	1,004 hPa (29.65 inHg)	South China	None	None	
Angela (Rubing)	September 28 – October 10	Very strong typhoon	175 km/h (110 mph)	925 hPa (27.32 inHg)	Philippines, Vietnam	$8 million	119	
Brian	September 28 – October 4	Typhoon	120 km/h (75 mph)	970 hPa (28.64 inHg)	South China, Vietnam	$222 million	40	
Colleen	October 1–8	Typhoon	150 km/h (95 mph)	950 hPa (28.05 inHg)	Caroline Islands, Mariana Islands	None	None	
Dan (Saling)	October 8–14	Typhoon	140 km/h (85 mph)	960 hPa (28.35 inHg)	Caroline Islands, Philippines, Vietnam, South China	$59.2 million	109	
Elsie (Tasing)	October 13–22	Very strong typhoon	185 km/h (115 mph)	915 hPa (27.02 inHg)	Philippines, South China, Vietnam	$35.4 million	47	
Forrest	October 21–29	Typhoon	155 km/h (95 mph)	940 hPa (27.76 inHg)	Caroline Islands	None	None	
Gay	October 31 – November 4	Very strong typhoon	165 km/h (105 mph)	935 hPa (27.61 inHg)	Thailand	$497 million	833	
Hunt (Unsing)	November 15–24	Typhoon	140 km/h (85 mph)	960 hPa (28.35 inHg)	Caroline Islands, Philippines	$350,000	11	
Irma (Walding)	November 20 – December 4	Very strong typhoon	175 km/h (110 mph)	925 hPa (27.32 inHg)	Caroline Islands	None	None	
35W	December 5–9	Tropical depression	55 km/h (35 mph)	1,002 hPa (29.59 inHg)	Caroline Islands	None	None	
Yeyeng	December 9–12	Tropical depression	55 km/h (35 mph)	1,004 hPa (29.65 inHg)	None	None	None	
Jack	December 21–28	Very strong typhoon	175 km/h (110 mph)	925 hPa (27.32 inHg)	Caroline Islands, Mariana Islands	None	None	
Season aggregates
55 systems	January 15 – December 28, 1989		185 km/h (115 mph)	915 hPa (27.02 inHg)		$2.36 billion	3,535	

== See also ==
- 1989 Pacific hurricane season
- 1989 Atlantic hurricane season
- 1989 North Indian Ocean cyclone season
- South-West Indian Ocean cyclone seasons: 1988–89, 1989–90
- Australian region cyclone seasons: 1988–89, 1989–90
- South Pacific cyclone seasons: 1988–89, 1989–90
