= List of people from Ann Arbor, Michigan =

The following is a list of notable Ann Arborites (people born in or associated with the city of Ann Arbor, Michigan). Note that it does not include people associated with Ann Arbor only as students or alumni of the University of Michigan.

== Activists and advocates ==
- Keith Hefner, activist

== Artists ==
- Virgil Exner, automobile designer
- Fred Gallagher, cartoonist
- Virginia Hendrickson Irvin, painter
- Gerome Kamrowski, abstract painter
- Terry LaBan, cartoonist
- Benjamin McCready, portrait painter
- Antony Natsoulas, sculptor and contemporary artist
- Irving Kane Pond, architect
- Susan Skarsgard, graphic designer and calligrapher
- Anna Sui, fashion designer
- Timothy Van Laar, painter
- Leo Zulueta, tattoo artist

== Athletes and sports figures ==
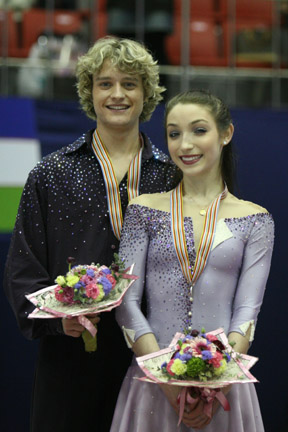
Charlie White

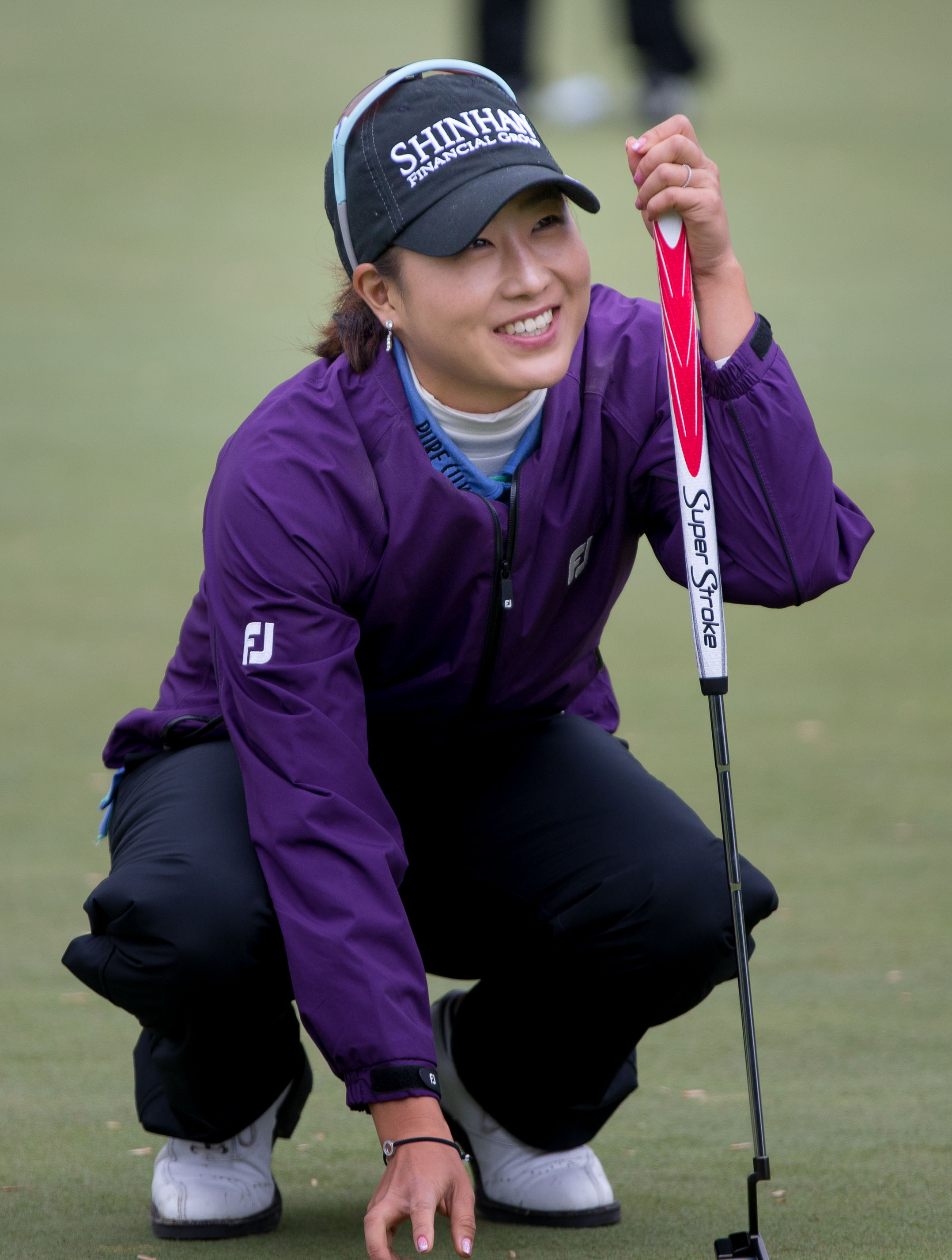
Jennifer Song

- Kole Ayi, NFL player
- Aaron Bailey, NFL wide receiver
- Charles A. Baird (c. 1870–1944), first UM athletic director
- Rich Balchan, soccer player
- Chris Ballingall, baseball player
- Evan Bates, figure skater
- Keith Bostic, NFL defensive back
- Rebecca Bross, artistic gymnast
- Sam Brown, soccer player
- Ian Cole, NHL hockey player
- Andrew Copp, NHL hockey player
- Fritz Crisler (1899–1982), football coach
- Ali Curtis, professional soccer player
- Ken Dyer, NFL player
- Bunny Fabrique, professional baseball player who played shortstop for the 1916–1917 Brooklyn Robins
- Francie Kraker Goodridge, track and field, first Michigan-born woman on U.S. Olympic team
- Alison Gregorka, water polo player, Olympic silver medalist
- Eliot Halverson, figure skater
- Jim Harbaugh, NFL quarterback and coach
- John Harbaugh, NFL coach
- Danielle Hartsell, pair skater, sister of Steve Hartsell
- Steve Hartsell, pair skater, brother of Danielle Hartsell
- Howdy Holmes, race driver
- Keiffer Hubbell, figure skater
- Madison Hubbell, figure skater
- Zeke Jones, wrestling coach, Olympic silver medalist
- Steven Kampfer, professional hockey player
- Hobbs Kessler, professional runner for Adidas
- Bruce Kimball, Olympic diver
- Aaron Krickstein (born 1967), tennis player, world #6
- Steve Morrison, NFL linebacker, college football coach
- Gabe Muoneke, professional basketball player
- Veronica Pershina, figure skater, coach
- Jeff Petry, NHL hockey player
- Emily Samuelson, figure skater
- Jennifer Song, professional golfer
- James Toney, world champion professional boxer
- Austin Watson, professional ice hockey player
- Alan Webb, professional track athlete
- Charlie White, ice dancer, figure skater, 2014 Olympic gold medalist
- Fielding H. Yost (1871–1946), football coach
- Jason Zucker (born 1992), NHL hockey player

== Authors ==
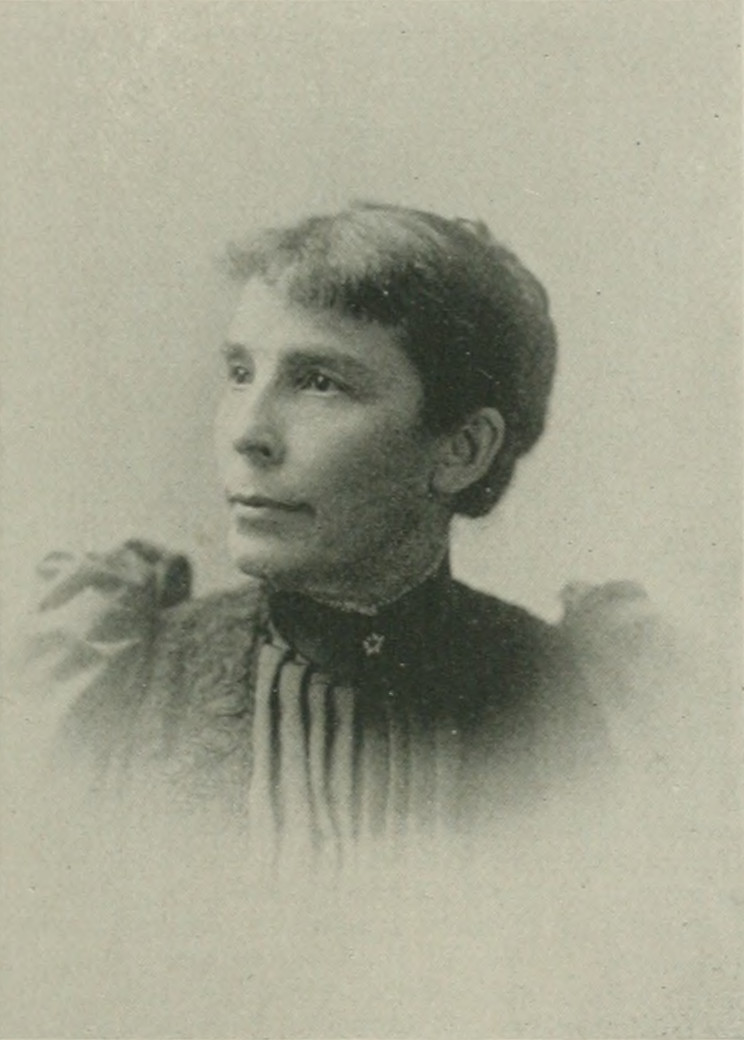
Clara Doty Bates

- Katherine Applegate, young adult and children's fiction writer
- Clara Doty Bates, author
- Charles Baxter, novelist
- T. Casey Brennan, comic book author
- Joseph Brodsky (1940-1996), Russian-American poet, Nobel Laureate
- Emily Colas, novelist
- Nicholas Delbanco, novelist
- Dorothy Marie Donnelly, poet
- Donald Dunbar, poet
- Loren D. Estleman, mystery and western novelist
- Elizabeth Farrand, author and librarian
- James Hynes, novelist
- Jane Juska, author
- George Kao, author, translator
- Laura Kasischke, novelist, poet
- Jane Kenyon, poet
- Elizabeth Kostova, novelist
- Lillian Li, author
- Bruce McConkie (1915–1985), Mormon theologian, poet
- Elizabeth Meriwether, writer, producer
- Angel Nafis, poet
- Davi Napoleon, drama critic, theatre historian
- Andrea Phillips, author, game designer
- John Pollack, author, presidential speechwriter
- Ann Purmell, children's book author
- Davy Rothbart, author, filmmaker, journalist
- Mike Rother, author on industrial management
- Allan Seager (1906–1968), novelist, short story writer
- Alfred Slote, children's author
- Sarah Weeks, children's author
- Nancy Willard, children's author

== Educators ==
- Henry Carter Adams (1851–1921), economist
- Akhil Amar, legal scholar
- James Burrill Angell (1829–1916), journalist, diplomat, University of Michigan president
- Gwendolyn Calvert Baker (1931–2019), educator, activist, and nonprofit executive
- Allen Britton (1914–2003), music educator, dean, UM School of Music
- Theodore V. Buttrey (1929–2018), classicist
- Carl Cohen, philosopher, activist
- Charles Cooley (1864–1929), sociologist
- Richard Crawford, music historian
- John H. D'Arms (1934–2002), classicist
- John Dewey (1859–1952), educational philosopher, reformer
- Dag Øistein Endsjø, Norwegian scholar of religion
- Sidney Fine (1920–2009), historian
- Ben Finegold, chess Grandmaster
- Robben Fleming (1916–2010), UM president
- David Noel Freedman (1922–2008), biblical scholar
- Harlan Hatcher (1898–1998), UM president
- H. Wiley Hitchcock (1923–2007), musicologist
- Catharine MacKinnon, feminist legal scholar
- Mary Beth Norton, historian
- Kenneth Lee Pike (1912–2000), linguist
- Alvin Plantinga (born 1932), philosopher
- Shael Polakow-Suransky, deputy chancellor, New York City Public Schools
- Michael Porter (born 1947), economist
- Michelle Rhee (born 1969), educator, activist
- Martha Farnsworth Riche, economist
- Wilfrid Sellars (1912–1989), philosopher
- Harold Shapiro, economist, UM president
- Henry Philip Tappan (1805–1881), first UM president
- Claude H. Van Tyne (1869–1930), historian
- Robert M. Warner (1927–2007), archivist of the United States, dean, UM School of Library Science
- Glenn Watkins, musicologist
- Leslie White (1900–1975), anthropologist
- Letty M. Wickliffe (1902–2001), special education director in Indianapolis
- Raymond Louis Wilder (1896–1982), mathematician

== Entertainment ==
- Robert Ashley, composer of television operas
- Ken Burns, documentary filmmaker
- Ric Burns, documentary filmmaker
- Areeya Chumsai, model, filmmaker
- Andrew Cohn, documentary filmmaker
- Jack Falahee, actor, How To Get Away With Murder
- Nicole Forester, actress
- Megan Ganz, comedy writer, producer
- David S. Goyer, filmmaker
- Zach Grenier, actor
- Grace Henderson (1860–1944), stage and silent film actress
- Gary Hutzel, visual effects supervisor
- Michael Kosta, stand-up comedian and correspondent on The Daily Show
- Lisa Kron, actress, playwright
- Anna Rose Kessler Moore, singer-songwriter
- Austin Nichols, actor
- Michael Schur, television producer, writer, and actor
- Kristina and Karissa Shannon, Playboy models
- Martha Vickers (1925–1971), actress; wife of Mickey Rooney
- Grace Lee Whitney (1930–2015), actress, Star Trek

== Entrepreneurs and business figures ==
- Tom and Louis Borders, founders of Borders
- Jim Buckmaster, CEO of Craigslist
- Bill Hewlett (1913–2001), engineer, co-founder of Hewlett-Packard
- Bruce Iglauer, founder of Alligator Records
- John and Thomas Knoll, creators of Adobe Photoshop
- Tom Monaghan (born 1937), founder of Domino's Pizza, former Detroit Tigers owner
- Eugene Power (1905–1988), microfilming and micropublishing pioneer
- Jeff Shell (born 1965), CEO of NBCUniversal

== Journalists and media figures ==
- Jill Carroll, journalist, kidnapped in Iraq
- Keith Gave, journalist, sportswriter
- Charles J. Guiteau, writer and lawyer; responsible for the assassination of James A. Garfield
- Reed Hundt, Federal Communications Commission chair
- Ken Kelley, journalist, editor, and publisher
- Jay Nordlinger, conservative political columnist
- John Pollack, journalist, speech writer
- Monika Samtani, broadcast journalist
- Mike Tirico, sportscaster, Monday Night Football
- Neda Ulaby, public radio correspondent
- David Westin, media CEO

== Luthiers ==
- Gregg Alf, violin maker
- Joseph Curtin, violin maker

== Musicians and music groups ==
- William Albright (1944–1998), composer, pianist
- Katherine Anderson, singer
- Ron Asheton (1948–2009), guitarist, bassist and songwriter
- Scott Asheton (1949–2014), drummer and co-songwriter
- Robert Ashley (1930–2014), composer, audio synthesis pioneer
- Ayo & Teo, music duo
- Leslie Bassett (1923–2016), composer
- Chris Bathgate, singer-songwriter
- Eve Beglarian, composer
- William Bolcom, pianist, composer
- Muruga Booker, percussionist
- Brownsville Station, rock group
- Chenille Sisters, folk group
- Commander Cody and His Lost Planet Airmen, formed in Ann Arbor
- Lewis Hugh Cooper (1920–2007), bassoonist
- Max Crook, rock musician
- Dabrye (Tadd Mullinix), electronic dance musician
- Damien Done, post-punk / gothic rock band, formed in Florida, relocated to Ann Arbor in 2006
- James Dapogny, pianist, jazz scholar
- Bryan Devendorf, drummer for The National
- Disco D (1980–2007), record producer, composer
- Elephante (Tim Wu), DJ, musician, producer
- Ross Lee Finney (1906–1997), composer
- Tony Fontane (1925–1974), gospel singer-songwriter, actor
- Frontier Ruckus, indie folk, alt-country band
- Sameer Gadhia, singer, Young the Giant
- Robert Glasgow (1925–2008), organist
- Laurel Halo, electronic musician, composer
- Mayer Hawthorne, singer-songwriter and musician
- Deon Jackson, soul singer-songwriter
- Eva Jessye (1895–1992), choral director, composer
- James Kibbie, organist
- Lyndon Lawless, conductor, music educator
- Eva Likova (1919–2004), operatic soprano
- Marilyn Mason (1925–2019), organist
- Roger, Ben, and Larry Miller
- Scott Morgan, rock musician
- Joan Morris, vocalist
- Damien Moyal, singer and musician
- Randy Napoleon, jazz guitarist
- Nicholas Phan, opera singer
- Pity Sex, indie rock band
- Iggy Pop, front man, artist, and actor
- William Revelli (1902–1994), band director
- H. Robert Reynolds, band director
- Samiyam, hip-hop producer
- Bob Seger, rock and roll singer-songwriter
- Shigeto, electronic musician
- Dick Siegel, singer-songwriter, guitarist, and visual artist
- Donald Sinta, saxophonist
- Tom Smith, filk musician
- Kate Soper, composer
- Steven Springer, guitarist, songwriter
- SRC, rock band
- Colin Stetson, musician, composer
- Tally Hall, indie rock band
- Taproot, nu metal band
- Deniz Tek, guitarist with Australian rock band Radio Birdman
- Vulfpeck, funk group
- Andrew W.K., singing-songwriter, television host
- We Are the Union, ska punk band
- Ben Wilson, keyboard player in Blues Traveler
- George Balch Wilson, composer
- Wolf Eyes, industrial rock band
- "Shakey Jake" Woods (1925–2007), street musician
- Jeff Young, guitarist in Megadeth

== Politicians ==
- John Allen (died 1851), co-founder of Ann Arbor, attorney, state senator
- Bruce Bartlett, historian, political adviser
- Louis D. Belcher, mayor
- Elizabeth Brater, state senator
- Barbara Everitt Bryant (1926–2023), first woman to lead the US Census Bureau
- Jane L. Campbell, mayor of Cleveland, Ohio
- Pia Cayetano, senator of the Philippines
- Thomas M. Cooley (1824–1898), chief justice, Michigan Supreme Court
- Debbie Dingell, congresswoman
- Samuel J. Eldersveld (1917–2010), political scientist, mayor
- Abdul El-Sayed, physician and candidate for Governor of Michigan in 2018 and United States senator-elect in 2026
- Marilyn L. Huff, judge
- James Kingsley (1797–1878), attorney, state legislator, mayor
- Chris Kolb, state legislator, first openly gay member of the Michigan legislature
- Edwin Lawrence (1808–1885), Michigan jurist and state representative
- William S. Maynard (1802–1866), merchant, land developer, mayor
- Mike Nahan, Australian politician
- Robert D. Orr (1917–2004), governor of Indiana
- Edward C. Pierce (1930–2002), physician, mayor of Ann Arbor
- Elisha Rumsey (1785–1827), co-founder of Ann Arbor
- Brian Schatz, U.S. senator for Hawaii
- Patricia Secrest, state representative
- Ingrid Sheldon, mayor, 1993–2000
- Benjamin Sherman, Wisconsin state assemblyman and senator
- Neil Staebler (1905–2000), congressman, Democratic politician
- L. D. Taylor (1857–1946), mayor of Vancouver
- Albert H. Wheeler (1915–1994), microbiologist, first African-American mayor of Ann Arbor

== Scientists ==
- Eric Betzig, physicist, Nobel laureate
- Richard Crandall, physicist, computer scientist
- Kazimierz Fajans (1887–1975), physical chemist
- John H. Hubbell (1925–2007), radiation physicist
- Emmett Leith (1927–2005), electrical engineer, co-inventor of holography
- Deirdre McCloskey, economist
- Anne McNeil, microplastics scientist, L.S.A member
- James V. Neel (1915–2000), geneticist
- Anatol Rapoport (1911–2007), mathematical psychologist
- Elizabeth S. Russell, biologist
- Annette Salmeen, biochemist, Rhodes Scholar, Olympic gold medalist
- John Martin Schaeberle (1853–1924), astronomer
- Gene Sperling, economic advisor
- Jean Tatlock, psychiatrist, physician
- Samuel Ting, physicist, Nobel laureate
- Henry F. Vaughan, epidemiologist and founder of University of Michigan School of Public Health
- James Craig Watson (1838–1880), astronomer
- Thomas Huckle Weller (1915–2008), virologist, Nobel laureate

== See also ==
- List of University of Michigan alumni
