= Kessler (name) =

Kessler or Keßler is a surname of German origin. It is an occupational name that means coppersmith, or more precisely, a kettle (German Kessel) maker. In alpine countries, the name derived from the definition "the one living in the basin of a valley".

People named Kessler include:

- Achim Kessler (born 1964), German politician
- Adolf Wilhelm von Kessler (1839–1895), German banker
- Alice Harriet von Kessler, Anglo-Irish socialite
- Alice & Ellen Kessler (twin sisters; 1936–2025), German singers, dancers, and actresses
- Amalia Kessler, American lawyer
- Andrew Kessler (politician) (died 1896), American politician from Maryland
- Anna Rose Kessler Moore, American singer
- Andy Kessler (author), (born 1959), author, investor, financier
- Andy Kessler (skateboarder), (died 2009), skateboarder
- Barbara Kessler, American singer-songwriter
- Bruce Kessler, television and film director
- Chad Kessler (born 1975), American football player
- Claudia Kessler (born 1965), German aerospace engineer
- Cody Kessler (born 1993), American football player
- Daniel Kessler (guitarist), lead guitarist for post-punk band Interpol
- David Aaron Kessler, scientist and former commissioner of the Food and Drug Administration
- David Kessler (actor), (1860–1920), Yiddish actor
- Donald J. Kessler, NASA scientist
- Edwin Kessler (1928–2017), American atmospheric scientist
- Emil Kessler (1813–1867), German engineer and businessman
- Frederick P. Kessler, Wisconsin legislator
- Friedrich Kessler, (1901–1998), American academic and scholar
- Friedrich August Kessler (1842–1921), German landscape painter
- Geldolph Adriaan Kessler, Dutch industrialist and footballer
- George Kessler, city planner and landscape architect
- Germán Kessler (born 1994), Uruguayan rugby union player
- Gladys Kessler, American jurist
- Glenn Kessler (journalist), American journalist and author
- Glenn Kessler (screenwriter), American screenwriter and television producer
- Gustav Kessler, German trade unionist
- Harry von Kessler (1868–1937), an Anglo-German count, diplomat, writer, and patron of modern art
- Heinz Kessler (1920–2017), general from East Germany
- Henry Kessler (baseball) (1847–1900), American baseball player
- Jane Kessler (1921–2025), American psychologist
- Jari Kessler (born 1996), Croatian-Italian figure skater
- Jason Kessler (born 1983), organizer of the deadly white nationalist Unite the Right rally in Charlottesville, Virginia
- Jean Baptiste August Kessler, Dutch oil explorer
- Jeffrey L. Kessler (born 1954), American sports attorney
- Jeffrey V. Kessler (born 1955), American politician
- Jimmy Kessler, the first native Texan to assume leadership of Congregation B'nai Israel, Galveston, Texas
- John Kessler, Wisconsin legislator
- John Kessler (naval historian) (1761–1840)
- John Kessler, birth name of Jack Baker (magician) (1913/1914–1980), American magician
- Josef Alois Kessler, Volga German bishop
- Joseph Christoph Kessler, German pianist and composer
- Julius Kessler, was the founder of Kessler Whiskey
- Karl Fedorovich Kessler (1815–1881), German-Russian zoologist; author of zoological taxa signed Kessler
- Karl G. Kessler (1919–1997), American physicist
- Katja Kessler (born 1969), German journalist
- Kent Kessler (born 1957), American musician
- Linse Kessler (born 1966), Danish television personality, actress and businesswoman
- Liz Kessler, British author of children's books
- Matthias Kessler, German professional road racing cyclist
- McCartney Kessler, (born 1999), American tennis player
- Meredith Kessler (born 1978), American athlete
- Meir Kessler, rabbi
- Michael Kessler, German actor and comedian
- Michael G. Kessler, cited as first "forensic auditor", founder of Kessler International
- Mikkel Kessler, Danish boxer
- Minuetta Kessler (1914–2002), Canadian/American concert pianist, classical music composer, and educator
- Nadine Keßler, retired German footballer
- Oren Kessler, American political analyst, author and journalist
- Paul Joseph Antonius Kessler (born 1958), German botanist and entomologist
- Robert Kessler, All American basketball player (Purdue) and GM executive
- Ronald Kessler, American journalist and author
- Ronald C. Kessler (born 1947) American sociologist and psychiatrical epidemiologist
- Ryan Kesler, American NHL player
- Todd Kessler, American film and television writer, producer, director, co-creator of Blue's Clues
- Todd Ellis Kessler, American television writer and producer
- Walker Kessler (born 2001), American basketball player

== Fictional people ==
- Kessler, main antagonist in the video game, inFamous
- At the time of the shooting of the original Seinfeld pilot titled "The Seinfeld Chronicles", Kenny Kramer had not yet given consent to use his name, and so Cosmo Kramer's character was originally referred to as "Kessler"
- David Kessler is the name of the main character in the 1981 comedy-horror film An American Werewolf in London
- Edward Anselm 'Eddie' Kessler is the name of a character in HBO's Boardwalk Empire.
- Monty Kessler is the name of Brendan Fraser's character in the film With Honours
- Ulrich Kesler (voiced by Shūichi Ikeda) is a character in the science-fiction series Legend of the Galactic Heroes.
- Marie Kessler, aunt of protagonist Nick Burkhart in Grimm
- Kelly Kessler Burkhart, mother of protagonist Nick BurkHart in Grimm
- Donald Kessler, a character played by Pierce Brosnan in the 1996 science fiction comedy film Mars Attacks!
- Baroness Kessler, a character played by Barbara Jefford in the 1999 mystery thriller film The Ninth Gate
- Mitch Kessler, the main character, played by Steve Carell, of the Apple TV+ television show The Morning Show
- Gestapo Sturmbannführer Ludwig Kessler (played by Clifford Rose), a character in the TV series Secret Army and Kessler
- Henry Kessler, a character played by Michael Beach in the 2023 horror film Saw X

== See also ==
- Kessler R. Cannon (1915–1986), American politician
- Joe Spleen, born Andy Kessler, guitarist for The Gits
- Kessler (disambiguation)
