= Kessler =

Kessler or Keßler (in German) may refer to:

- Kessler (automobile), an American automobile made 1921–1922
- Kessler (name), people named Kessler
- Kessler (TV series), a 1981 British television series
- Kessler, Ohio, an unincorporated community, United States
- Kessler, West Virginia, an unincorporated community, United States
- Kessler syndrome, a scenario, proposed by NASA consultant Donald J. Kessler, involving space debris
- Kessler Whiskey, an American brand of blended whiskey
- Kessler Theater, a music venue and former movie theater in Dallas, Texas
- Kessler's, a former American department store chain
- Kesslers International Group, a British point-of-sale manufacturer

== See also ==
- Kesler, a German and Jewish surname
- Greg Kelser (born 1957), American basketball player
