= Secrest =

Secrest is a surname. Notable people with the surname include:

- Meryle Secrest, American biographer
- Patricia Secrest, American politician from Missouri
- Robert T. Secrest (1904–1994), American politician

== See also ==
- Seacrest
