= Eye (poetry collection) =

2022 poetry collection by Sati Mookherjee

- Author: Sati Mookherjee
- Genre: Poetry
- Publisher: Ravenna Press
- Publication date: August 2022
- ISBN: 978-1-7369169-3-3

Eye is a 2022 debut poetry collection by Sati Mookherjee, published by Ravenna Press.

== Form ==
The collection consists of three long poems: two titled "Kal" (Bengali for both "yesterday" and "tomorrow") which bookend a central poem titled "Dukkho" (meaning "sorrow"). It specifically interrogates and expresses the experiences of Mookherjee's grandfather, who was arrested and exiled from India seventeen years before India's independence.

In an interview with the Michigan Quarterly Review, Mookherjee said that the book is her grandfather's story "refracted through my own sensibility." She described the title as an assertion of "the importance of observation" encompassing both physical and metaphysical sight.

Spending eight years writing it, Mookherjee stated that the book's original length was three to four times longer than its published length, encompassing more experiences such as a friend's Burmese mother and a fictional Roma family. She then "threw away two-thirds of the manuscript and really tried to listen for the beating heart of what was left, which is the motif of orbits, the ripples and intersections of our individual circular journeys, across the earth and in and out of life and death."

== Critical reception ==
Raven Chronicles Press found the book compelling, stating that Mookherjee "works magic" in "poems within a narrative arc, without overloading the freight of exposition onto individual lyrics."

The Asian Review of Books said the collection "is not a traditional collection of poetry, but rather a series of just three poems that give a vivid sense of [Mookherjee's grandfather's] experiences during this historic era."
