= Sea chest =

Sea chest may refer to:

- Sea chest (nautical)
- Seaman's chest

== See also ==
- Seacrest
