= Jane Kenyon =

American poet, translator

- Born: May 23, 1947; Ann Arbor, Michigan; United States
- Died: April 22, 1995 (aged 47); Wilmot, New Hampshire; United States
- Education: University of Michigan
- Occupations: Poet, translator
- Spouse: Donald Hall (m. 1972)

Jane Kenyon (May 23, 1947 – April 22, 1995) was an American poet and translator. Her work is often characterized as simple, spare, and emotionally resonant. Kenyon was the second wife of poet, editor, and critic Donald Hall who made her the subject of many of his poems.

== Early life and education ==
Kenyon was born in 1947 in Ann Arbor, Michigan, to Ruele and Pauline, she grew up in the Midwest. She earned a B.A. from the University of Michigan in 1970 and an M.A. in 1972. She won a Hopwood Award at Michigan.

== Career ==
Four collections of Kenyon's poems were published during her lifetime: From Room to Room (1978), The Boat of Quiet Hours (1986), Let Evening Come (1990) and Constance (1993); apart from the former being published through Alice James Books, all of her writing was released through Graywolf Press. She spent some years translating the poems of Anna Akhmatova from Russian into English, and she championed translation as an important art that every poet should try.

Kenyon's poems are filled with rural images: light streaming through a hayloft, shorn winter fields.

Kenyon wrote frequently about wrestling with depression, which plagued her throughout her adult life. Kenyon's poem "Having it out with Melancholy" describes this struggle and the brief moments of happiness she felt when taking an MAOI, Nardil.

Often I go to bed as soon after dinner
as seems adult
(I mean I try to wait for dark)
in order to push away
from the massive pain in sleep's
frail wicker coracle.

Two visits to India in the early 1990s led to Kenyon having a crisis of faith, as Hall (in introductions to her books and in his own memoirs), Alice Mattison, and her biographer John Timmerman have described.

Kenyon was also a contributor to Columbia: A Journal of Literature and Art.

Prior to her death, she was editing the collection Otherwise: New and Selected Poems. Kenyon's papers, including manuscripts, personal journals, and notebooks are held at the University of New Hampshire Library Special Collections and Archives.

== Personal life ==
As a university student Kenyon met poet Donald Hall; though he was some nineteen years her senior, she married him in 1972, and they moved to his ancestral home in Wilmot, New Hampshire.

Kenyon struggled with depression for most of her life.

Kenyon died on April 22, 1995, from leukemia.

== Recognition ==
In 1994 Kenyon was awarded the PEN/Voelcker Award for Poetry.

Kenyon was New Hampshire's poet laureate at the time of her death.

== In popular culture ==
"Let Evening Come" was featured in the 2005 film In Her Shoes, in a scene where the character played by Cameron Diaz reads the poem (as well as "One Art" by Elizabeth Bishop) to a blind nursing home resident.

"Having it out with Melancholy" has been read by Amanda Palmer on Brain Pickings.

== Bibliography ==
- From Room to Room (November 1, 1978)
- The Boat of Quiet Hours (October 24, 1986)
- Let Evening Come (April 30, 1990)
- Constance (July 12, 1993)
- Otherwise: New & Selected Poems (March 2, 1996; posthumous release)
- Collected Poems (September 1, 2005; posthumous anthology release)

== Notes ==
- Hornback, Bert G. (1 September 2000). Bright Unequivocal Eye": Poems, Papers and Remembrances from the First Jane Kenyon Conference. Peter Lang. pp. 11–26. ISBN 978-0820445854.
- Mattison, Alice (2000). "Let It Grow in the Dark Like a Mushroom: Writing with Jane Kenyon". Michigan Quarterly Review. 39. University of Michigan: 121–37. ISSN 0026-2420.
- Timmerman, John H. (September 2002). Jane Kenyon: A Literary Life. William B. Eerdmans Publishing Company. ISBN 978-0802839435.
