= Elizabeth Gaffney =

American novelist

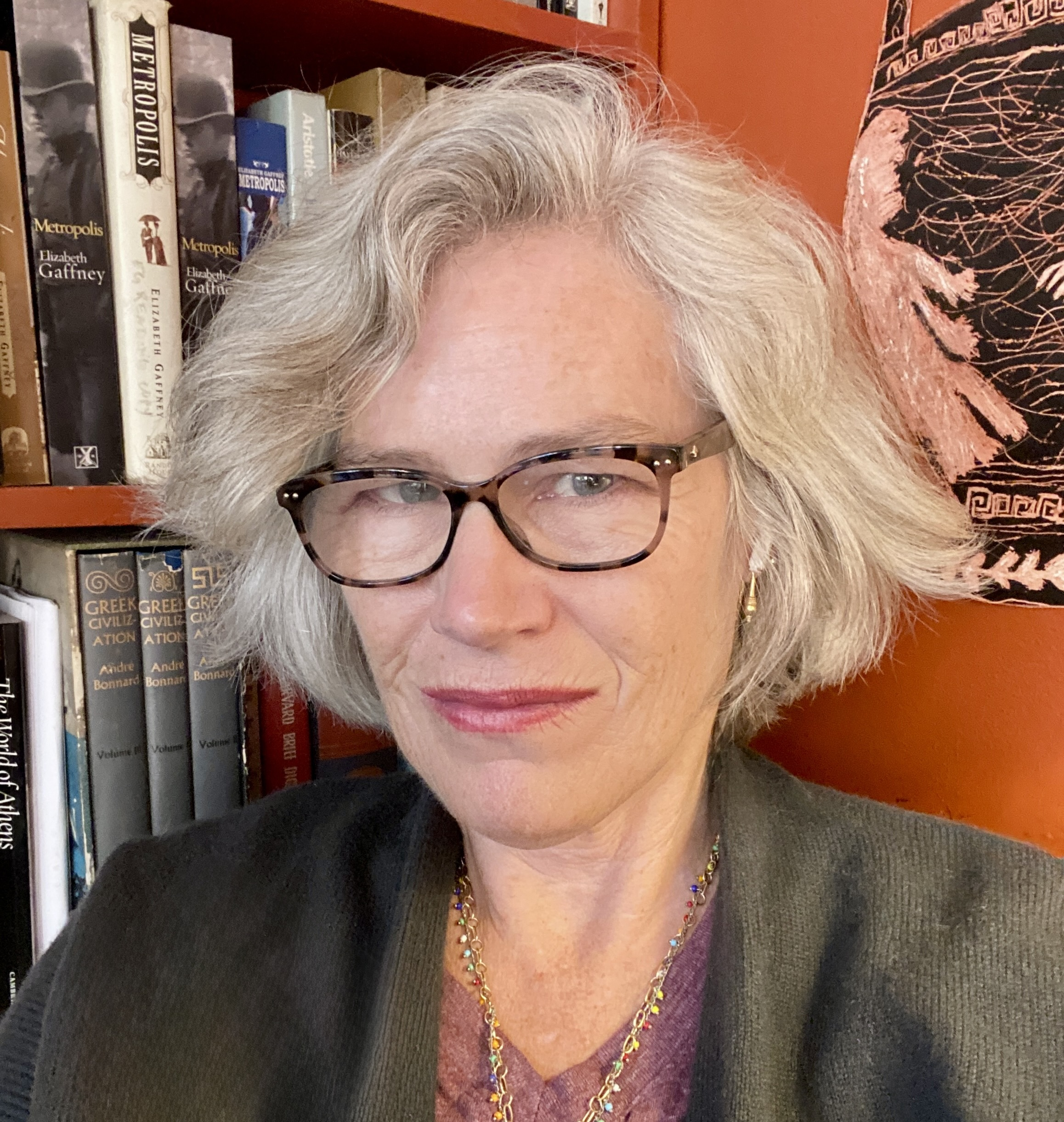
- Elizabeth Gaffney, 2024
- Born: December 22, 1966 (age 59) New York City, U.S.
- Occupation: Novelist
- Education: Vassar College (AB); Brooklyn College (MFA)
- Notable works: Metropolis, When the World Was Young
- Notable awards: The Lawrence Prize for Fiction

Website
- elizabethgaffney.net

Elizabeth Gaffney (born December 22, 1966, in New York City) is an American novelist.

== Education ==
She graduated from Vassar College and holds an MFA in fiction from Brooklyn College.

== Career ==
Gaffney is the author of two novels published by Random House. Metropolis was published in 2005. When the World Was Young was published in 2015.

Gaffney has published short stories in literary magazines including Virginia Quarterly Review, North American Review, Conjunctions and Michigan Quarterly Review.

Gaffney has translated four books from German: The Arbogast Case by Thomas Hettche, The Pollen Room by Zoë Jenny, Invisible Woman: Growing up Black in Germany, by Ika Hügel-Marshall and You Can't See the Elephants by Susan Kreller.

== Awards and honors ==
She won the 2019 Lawrence Prize for Fiction.
