= Drillship Seacrest =

History

United States
- Name: DS Seacrest
- Owner: Unocal Corporation
- Operator: Seacrest Drilling Co., Great Eastern Drilling & Services Inc., Singapore
- Port of registry: Panama
- Builder: Far East-Levingston Shipbuilding Ltd., Singapore
- Completed: 1977
- Identification: IMO number: 7423823; Call Sign: HO5303
- Fate: Sunk, November 3, 1989

General characteristics
- Class & type: TD-E Drilling Ship
- Tonnage: 4,400 ton
- Length: 362 ft (110 m)
- Beam: 70 ft (21 m)
- Depth: 24 ft (7.3 m)
- Installed power: 6,625 bhp (4,873 kW)

DS Seacrest, also known as "the Scan Queen", was a drill ship built by Far East Levingston Shipbuilding Ltd., Singapore, owned by Unocal Corporation and operated by Great Eastern Drilling and Engineering company. It was sunk by Typhoon Gay in the Gulf of Thailand on 3 November 1989. Ninety-one rig workers were killed after the vessel capsized, resulting in a massive legal case brought against the ship's owners UNOCAL. There were only six reported survivors: one Indonesian diver and five Thai rig crew, although these figures vary slightly depending on the source, though all of them agree the death toll would make the sinking the 3rd deadliest offshore disaster in history. Many of the bodies were never recovered. Typhoon Gay produced winds of 100 knots (51 m/s) or more with 12-metre (40 ft) waves. It left hundreds of sunken fishing vessels in its wake, killing 529 people and leaving approximately 160,000 homeless.

The main cause of the ship capsizing was Unocal, to save time, and money during drilling operations ordered that the drill pipe standing in the Derrick caused loss of stability.

Normally during a bit change when there is any weather danger, the pipe is sent down and stored on deck.

Even since then, Drilling Operations are stopped and personnel are sent ashore, for their safety.

== Before the storm ==
DS Seacrest had been operating in the Gulf of Thailand since 1981 for the purpose of drilling gas wells for Unocal. At the time of the incident, Seacrest had been anchored at the Platong gas field. When drilling, the ship was moored over the well site by eight anchors distributed around the ship. Each anchor weighed 14 tonnes (30,000 lb) and was connected to the ship by wire rope cables 50 millimetres (2 in) in diameter and 2,100 metres (7,000 ft) in total length. All of the anchor cables on Seacrest were replaced with new cables during the summer of 1989, shortly before the storm. The ship heading as indicated on the last rig move report was 90° east.

On 3 November 1989, the 130 millimetres (5 in) drill pipe had reached a depth of 1,130 metres (3,707 ft). The rig had been in the tropical storm since the Tuesday, 31 October electric logging was performed. The superintendent ignored storm warnings, saying, "There hasn't been a typhoon for 50 years in the Gulf of Thailand, so keep working". There was 3,800 metres (12,500 ft) of drill-pipe in the derrick and the rig was out of survey since the top-drive had been installed. The superintendent's report stated that winds and seas increased at approximately 01:00 on the day of the capsize. The increasing severity of the weather forced the rig workers to hang the drill pipe in the hole on the lower rams. It was determined from the morning report that drilling activities ceased around midnight. By 03:00 the drill pipe in the hole was hanging on the lower rams. The rig workers, however, did not have time to lay down the 27 metres (90 ft) lengths of drill pipe that remained in the derrick.

== Typhoon Gay ==
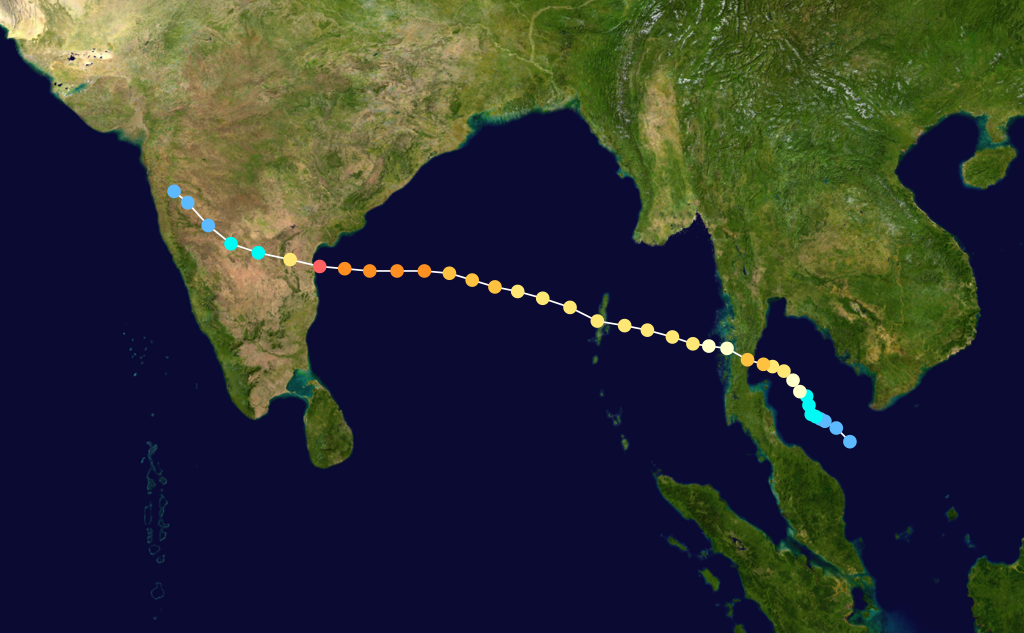
Map plotting the storm's track and intensity, according to the Saffir–Simpson scale Map key Saffir–Simpson scale Tropical depression (≤38 mph, ≤62 km/h) Tropical storm (39–73 mph, 63–118 km/h) Category 1 (74–95 mph, 119–153 km/h) Category 2 (96–110 mph, 154–177 km/h) Category 3 (111–129 mph, 178–208 km/h) Category 4 (130–156 mph, 209–251 km/h) Category 5 (≥157 mph, ≥252 km/h) Unknown Storm type Tropical cyclone Subtropical cyclone Extratropical cyclone, remnant low, tropical disturbance, or monsoon depression

On 3 November 1989, the Seacrest capsized in Unocal's Platong gas field during the passage of Typhoon Gay. Seacrest had a crew of 97 at the time of the incident. Six survived. The cause of the capsize is attributed to the ship's unseaworthiness as well as the severe weather conditions encountered by the ship during the storm. Contrary to industry custom and practice, Unocal did not have a standby vessel tending to the Seacrest at the time she capsized, so the crewmen in the water were carried away by the typhoon and the loss of the ship went unnoticed until a helicopter found it floating upside down some four miles from its last location the next day, 4 November. No survivors were found at that time.

Typhoon Gay was the first typhoon in the past forty years to form in the Gulf of Thailand. Other typhoons which have traversed the gulf have all formed outside the gulf and then entered the gulf, providing substantially more warning of their intensity and direction. Based on weather modelling, the hindcast analysis indicates that the storm rapidly intensified in the vicinity of the Platong field during the morning of 3 November. The storm reached typhoon strength as it approached the Seacrest. Thai military marine weather forecasts and the marine weather forecasts of a private weather service under contract to Unocal's partner in its activities in the Gulf of Thailand, Mitsui Oil Exploration Company (MOECO), had accurately predicted the general path of the storm toward the Seacrest's area of operation and its intensification in the days before 3 November. Despite the availability of these forecasts, Unocal did not provide weather information about the storm to the Seacrest until 3 November. By then it was too late to save the men on the ship. (The Seacrest was unable to receive marine weather forecasts itself because Unocal had previously removed the radio equipment the ship needed to do so. Instead the ship's master got a daily weather fax from Unocal headquarters in Bangkok that was faxed to its company man on board who then gave it to the master. The fax was not a marine weather forecast; it was a general weather report that Unocal picked up each day at the office of the Meteorological Department of Thailand in Bangkok.)

Typhoon Gay is known to have passed directly over the Platong Living Quarters and then over the Seacrest. Both reported the calm during the eye of the storm. The Seacrest is known to have capsized after the eye passed over the ship and the weather abruptly turned severe again. At that time, the Seacrest was attached to one of its bow anchors and at least one of the other anchors in its eight anchor drilling mode anchor pattern. One of the survivors testified that moments before the capsize, he had seen the ship's chief engineer at one of the ship's anchor winches. The anchor winch was not working, so the chief engineer was trying to cut through the anchor cable with a fire axe in an apparent attempt to free the ship from the anchor so that it could navigate and steam up the bow anchor cable thereby avoiding wind and waves on its beam. Caught by at least two anchors, the ship was left taking the predominant wind and the waves on its beam. The ship oscillated broadside to the predominant wind, and, during a series of high waves, coupled with gusty typhoon-strength wind, suddenly, but predictably, capsized to port.

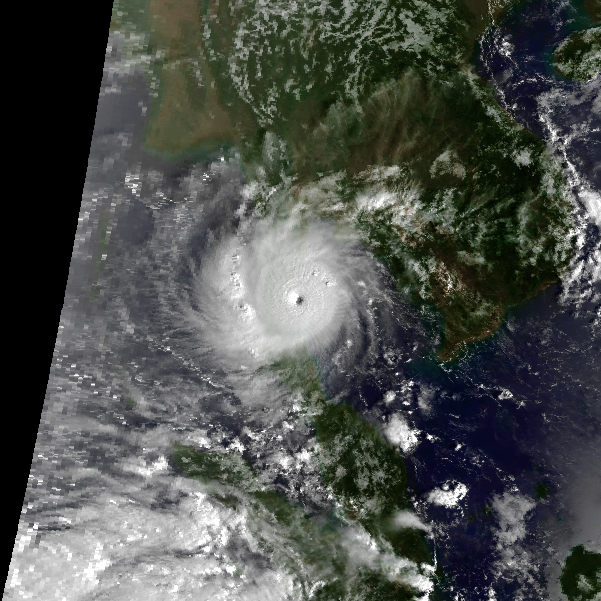
Typhoon Gay on November 3, just hours before making landfall in the Malay Peninsula

== Search and rescue ==
Search and rescue efforts were performed by Unocal and the Thai Navy. Unocal did not have a search and rescue plan in place, so it had to improvise its search and rescue efforts. It utilized helicopters, boats, and divers. The wreck, floating inverted approximately four nautical miles from the well site, was found by helicopter on 4 November. Divers were sent to the wreck to locate any crew who might have been trapped within the inverted hull, while supply boats and helicopters continued searching the surrounding sea for any crew who might have drifted away from the wreck. Divers found two bodies on the ship's bridge but no survivors in the capsized ship.

By 5 November, Unocal's supply boats and helicopters had searched an area of approximately a 30-mile radius from the Seacrest without finding any survivors. On 5–6 November, Thai fishing boats and the Thai Navy found six survivors in two groups approximately 62 and 69 miles northwest of the Seacrest. At that time, Unocal redirected its search to that region.

An analysis of the survivor drift trajectories was performed through analytical modelling of the wave, wind, and current forces. The analysis was based on hindcast wind, wave, and current data. Results showed that initial drift velocities for survivors in the water were high immediately after the capsize and for the next 24 hours. Within 24 hours the survivors were predicted to have drifted beyond the 30-nautical-mile radius initially searched.

Hindsight application of guidelines in the United States' National Search and Rescue Manual failed to accurately predict the actual survivor drift trajectories. Guidelines included in the manual are not applicable to rapidly changing weather such as those present in the vicinity of the eye of a typhoon. Several hindsight studies applying techniques included in this manual failed to predict either the correct drift velocities or direction. Based on this manual, the survivors should have been found within the region searched by UNOCAL, but the only survivors found were the six.

== Lawsuit against Unocal ==
There are conflicting reports about the cause of the capsize of the Seacrest. The plaintiffs, the four Thai survivors who sued Unocal for personal injuries, and the relatives of lost seamen who sued Unocal for the wrongful death of their loved ones, made essentially two claims as the cause of the survivors' injuries, the loss of loved ones, and the capsize of the Seacrest. First, Unocal was liable because it knew or reasonably should have known from the Thai military broadcasts of its marine forecasts and/or the marine forecasts of MOECO's weather service that an intensifying tropical cyclone was approaching Seacrest in the days before 3 November and, in conformance with industry custom and practice, should have evacuated all nonessential personnel to the nearby Platong platform and had the Seacrest prepared for heavy weather by 2 November. Second, Unocal was liable because Seacrest was in several respects not seaworthy as she lay in her drilling mode anchor moorings with drill pipe in her derrick, and as a result capsized when Typhoon Gay crossed its area of operation on 3 November. The plaintiffs based their claims on information from Unocal, Great Eastern, MOECO, party and non-party witnesses, including the accounts of the four Thai survivors. Unocal and the plaintiffs negotiated the plaintiffs' claims in Houston, Texas and settled the lawsuit. Unocal paid to settle all of the plaintiffs' claims. Because of the settlements there was no trial.

As part of Unocal's defense of the lawsuit, Unocal Thailand's legal department hired Failure Analysis Associates, Inc. (FaAA) to perform an investigation and analysis of events related to the loss of the ship. The scope of FaAA's investigation encompassed the analysis of: the physical condition and design of the ship; the weather and its effect on the dynamic response of the ship; the search and rescue effort; and safety training and operating procedures. FaAA did not, however, interview the Thai survivors or rely on their testimony in investigating what had transpired. FaAA also did not consider the marine forecasts broadcast by the Thai military or the marine forecasts of MOECO's weather service.

A detailed stability review was performed by FaAA as part of its investigation. It concluded that the ship was designed, built, and operated in accordance with American Bureau of Shipping (ABS) Standards. In 1988, the ship was modified to include a top drive unit. The stability effect of this modification was analyzed by FaAA, and it found that stability improved due to conversion of the No. 3 center tank to permanent ballast as part of the top drive modification. (FaAA never found the alleged ABS calculations and certification of the ship's stability with the top drive.) At the time of the capsize, FaAA reckoned that the ship was operating within accepted stability standards. However, its investigation revealed errors in the wind overturning moment calculations performed by the shipbuilder and approved by ABS. Erroneous instructions in the operator's manual would allow the ship to be operated with the height of the vertical center of gravity above accepted limits, resulting in reduced stability margin. FaAA reported that while this could have been a serious issue in this situation, it was not, since the ship was operating at less than the maximum allowable vertical position of the center of gravity prior to the event.

FaAA reported that at the time of the capsize most of the crew were gathered on the main deck aft, near the abandon ship stations. (This was contradicted by the four Thai survivors who described the crew as being in pandemonium in the aft part of the ship because of the typhoon. According to the survivors, it was only the effort of one member of the crew, Kent Nolen, who went down to the aft deck of the ship, took a fire hose, stretched it across the width of the ship and tied it off to make a lifeline for the crew to hold as water from breaking waves washed across deck, that allowed the crew to come out of the aft quarters and stand on deck. Mr. Nolen died on the ship's bridge with the master during the capsize.) FaAA also concluded that the ship appeared to be satisfactorily handling the seas and wind until several larger waves approached the ship and contributed to the capsize. (This is contradicted by the survivors who said the ship had difficulty handling the wind and waves on its beam and capsized as a result.) It is believed that most of the crew were thrown into the sea at the time of the capsize.

The result of FaAA's investigation was not surprising. FaAAs's conclusions were that the Seacrest was in satisfactory physical condition and was operating within design limits with regard to weight and stability. Emergency and safety training procedures were in place and drills occurred periodically. FaAA attributed the capsize to the unforeseen elevation of tropical disturbance Gay to typhoon strength in the vicinity of the Seacrest. It said that the combination of severe weather and waves overturned the ship unexpectedly. FaAA also said that forecast information did not indicate the force and location of this storm, thus failing to provide sufficient time to initiate emergency procedures and evacuation of the ship. FaAA deemed the lawsuit invalid. However despite FaAA's findings UNOCAL ultimately paid out millions of dollars in damages to settle the lawsuit brought against it by the surviving families of the victims drowned in the catastrophe.

== See also ==
- List of maritime disasters
- Typhoon Gay (1989)
