= Typhoon Gay =

Pacific typhoon and Indian cyclone in 1989

Typhoon/Super Cyclonic Storm Gay Kavali Cyclone of 1989
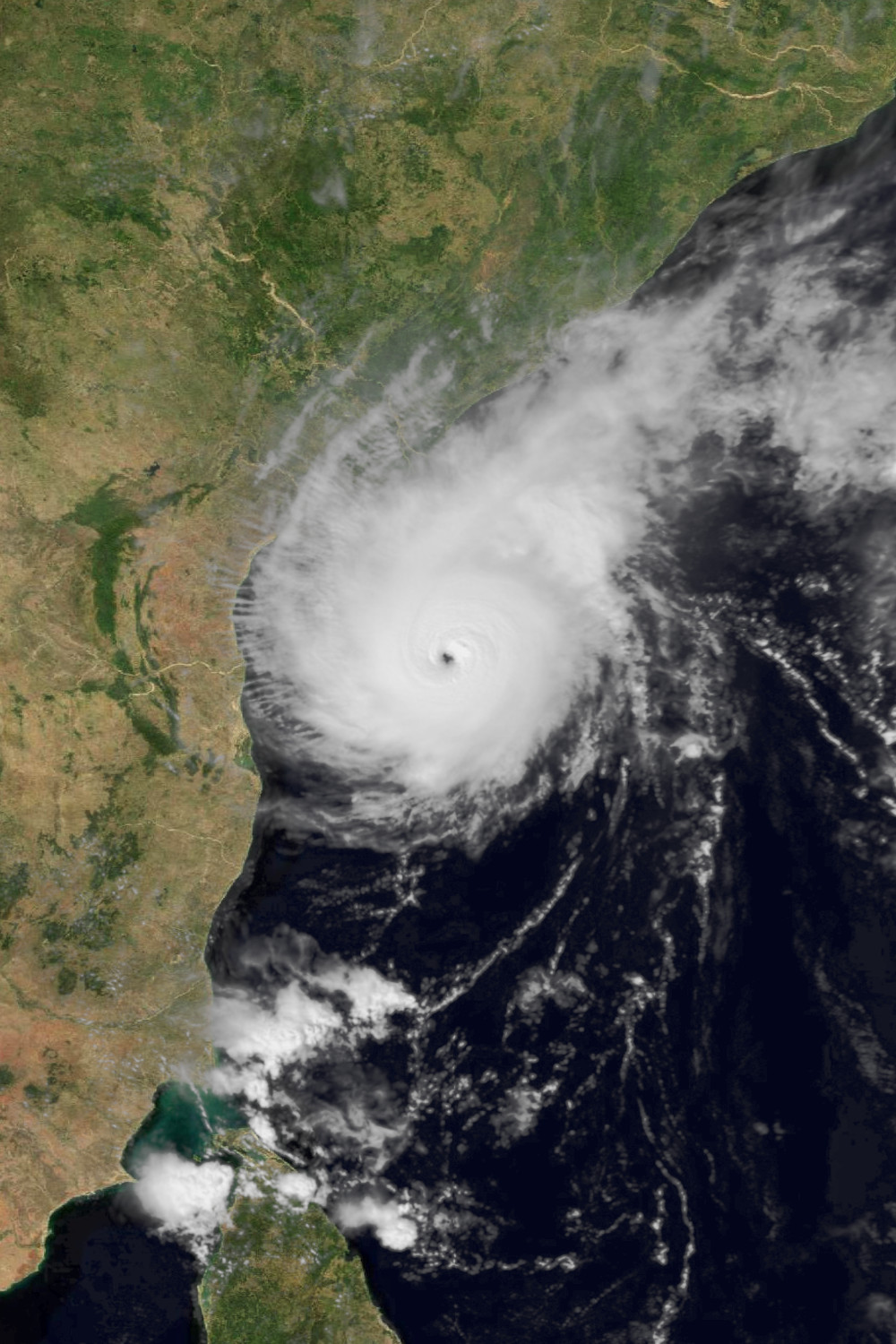
- Gay at peak intensity before making landfall on India on 8 November

Meteorological history
- Formed: 1 November 1989
- Dissipated: 10 November 1989

Super cyclonic storm
- 3-minute sustained (IMD)
- Highest winds: 230 km/h (145 mph)
- Lowest pressure: 930 hPa (mbar); 27.46 inHg

Very strong typhoon
- 10-minute sustained (JMA)
- Highest winds: 165 km/h (105 mph)
- Lowest pressure: 960 hPa (mbar); 28.35 inHg

Category 5-equivalent tropical cyclone
- 1-minute sustained (SSHWS/JTWC)
- Highest winds: 260 km/h (160 mph)

Overall effects
- Fatalities: 902
- Missing: 134
- Damage: $521 million (1989 USD)
- Areas affected: Thailand, Myanmar, India
- IBTrACS
- Part of the 1989 Pacific typhoon and North Indian Ocean cyclone seasons

Typhoon Gay, also known as Super Cyclonic Storm Gay or the Kavali Cyclone of 1989, was a small but powerful tropical cyclone which caused more than 800 fatalities in and around the Gulf of Thailand in November 1989. The worst typhoon to affect the Malay Peninsula in thirty-five years, Gay originated from a monsoon trough over the Gulf of Thailand in early November. Owing to favorable atmospheric conditions, the storm rapidly intensified, attaining winds over 120 km/h (75 mph) by 3 November. (Note: All sustained wind speeds are based on one-minute standards unless otherwise stated.) Later that day, Gay became the first typhoon since 1891 to make landfall in Thailand, striking Chumphon Province with winds of 185 km/h (115 mph). The small storm emerged into the Bay of Bengal and gradually reorganized over the following days as it approached southeastern India. On 8 November, Gay attained its peak intensity as a Category 5-equivalent cyclone with winds of 260 km/h (160 mph). The cyclone then moved ashore near Kavali, Andhra Pradesh. Rapid weakening ensued inland, and Gay dissipated over Maharashtra early on 10 November.

The typhoon's rapid development took hundreds of vessels by surprise, leading to 275 offshore fatalities. Of these, 91 occurred after an oil drilling ship, the Seacrest, capsized amid 6–11 m (20–36 ft) swells. Across the Malay Peninsula, 588 people died from various storm-related incidents. Several towns in coastal Chumphon were destroyed. Losses throughout Thailand totaled ฿11 billion (US $497 million). (Note: All damage figures in the article are in 1989 United States dollars (USD) unless otherwise stated.) Striking India as a powerful cyclone, Gay damaged or destroyed about 20,000 homes in Andhra Pradesh, leaving 100,000 people homeless. In that country, 69 deaths and ₹410 million (US $25.3 million) in damage were attributed to Gay.

== Meteorological history ==
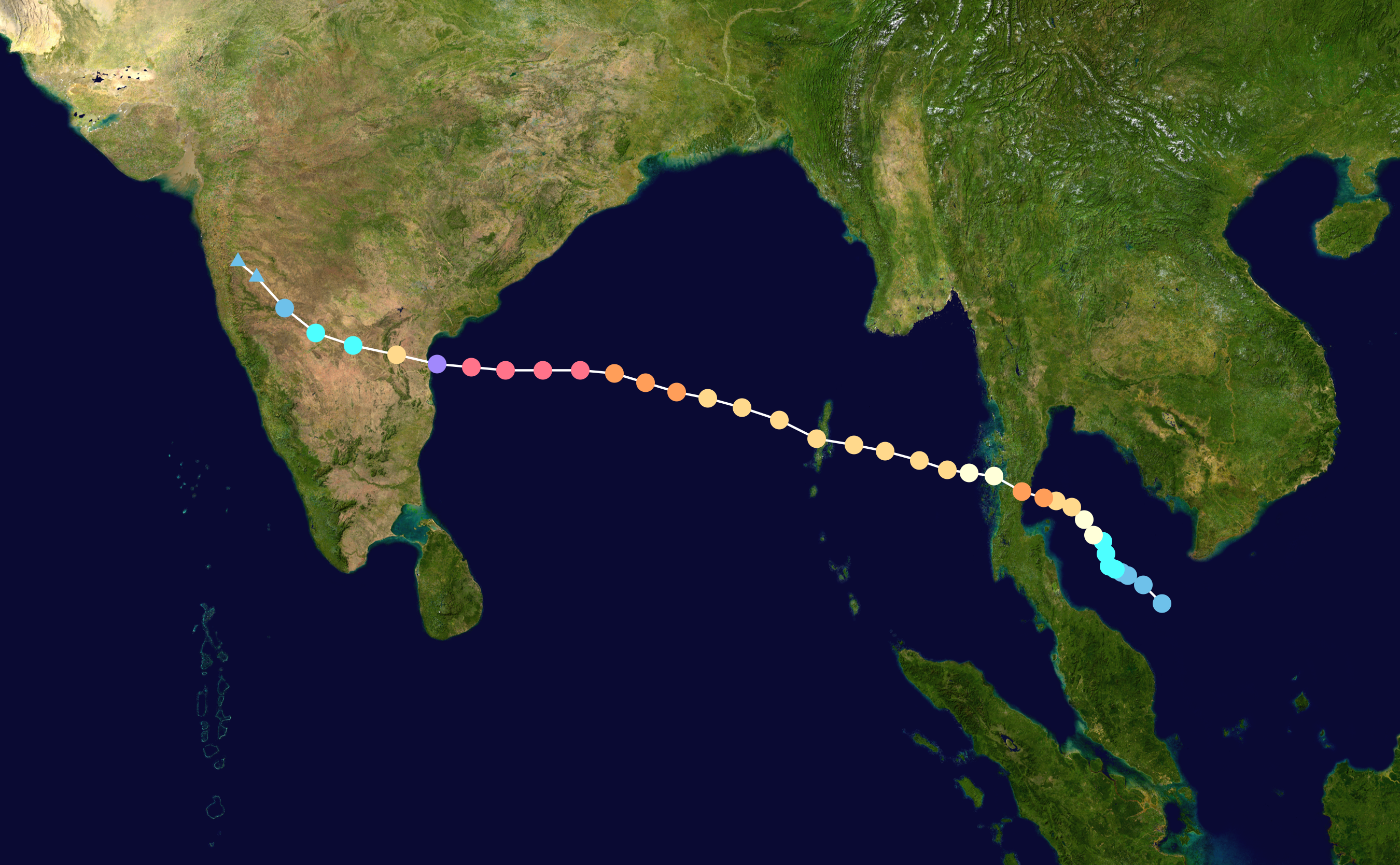
Map plotting the storm's track and intensity, according to the Saffir–Simpson scale Map key Saffir–Simpson scale Tropical depression (≤38 mph, ≤62 km/h) Tropical storm (39–73 mph, 63–118 km/h) Category 1 (74–95 mph, 119–153 km/h) Category 2 (96–110 mph, 154–177 km/h) Category 3 (111–129 mph, 178–208 km/h) Category 4 (130–156 mph, 209–251 km/h) Category 5 (≥157 mph, ≥252 km/h) Unknown Storm type Tropical cyclone Subtropical cyclone Extratropical cyclone, remnant low, tropical disturbance, or monsoon depression

In early November, a monsoon trough over the Gulf of Thailand showed signs of tropical cyclogenesis. A small, concentrated area of convection quickly developed over a low-pressure area within the trough, and on 2 November the system became sufficiently organized for the Joint Typhoon Warning Center (JTWC) to issue a Tropical Cyclone Formation Alert. (Note: The Joint Typhoon Warning Center is a joint United States Navy – United States Air Force task force that issues tropical cyclone warnings for the western Pacific Ocean and other regions.) Owing to its small size, the system began strengthening within the narrow gulf by taking advantage of warm waters and good outflow. Moving generally northwestward, it became a tropical depression later that day and underwent rapid intensification. As the newly named Tropical Storm Gay strengthened, it "presented a paradox to forecasters", according to Lieutenant Dianne K. Crittenden; synoptic data from Malaysia and Thailand indicated decreasing wind speeds and increasing barometric pressures around the storm, but these observations were later interpreted as increased subsidence.

Strengthening faster than anticipated, Gay attained typhoon status early on 3 November. Later that day, the storm developed an eye before passing over the Seacrest, an oil drilling ship. On 4 November, Gay's winds increased to 185 km/h (115 mph), equivalent to a Category 3 hurricane on the Saffir–Simpson hurricane scale, before making landfall in Chumphon Province, Thailand, at 0600 UTC. The Japan Meteorological Agency assessed that the storm had ten-minute sustained winds of 140 km/h (85 mph) and a pressure of 960 mbar (hPa; 28.35 inHg). (Note: The Japan Meteorological Agency is the official Regional Specialized Meteorological Center for the western Pacific Ocean.) Crossing the Kra Isthmus, Gay weakened to minimal typhoon status as it entered the Bay of Bengal. According to the India Meteorological Department (IMD), (Note: The India Meteorological Department is the official Regional Specialized Meteorological Center for the northern Indian Ocean.) Gay was the first typhoon since 1891 to form in the Gulf of Thailand and enter the Bay of Bengal. Responding to a ridge to its north, Gay maintained a west-northwestward to northwestward track for the next four days. The storm gradually restrengthened as it moved through an area of low wind shear and warm waters; however, this was limited by restrictions to the cyclone's outflow. Early on 6 November, Gay passed near the Andaman Islands as a Category 2-equivalent cyclone.

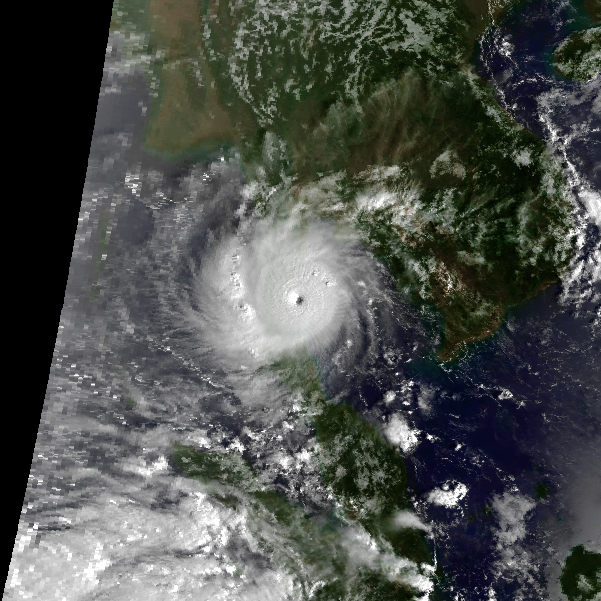
Gay at its initial peak intensity on 3 November, hours before making landfall in the Malay Peninsula

After changing little in intensity for much of 6 November, Gay strengthened as the ridge to its north intensified and the previous restrictions to its outflow diminished. The storm moved due west through a small fetch of warmer waters, fueling the process of intensification over the next 42 hours. Based on estimates provided through the use of the Dvorak technique, the JTWC assessed Gay to have attained its peak intensity as a Category 5-equivalent cyclone with winds of 260 km/h (160 mph) early on 8 November. Around this time, the IMD estimated that the storm had three-minute sustained winds of 230 km/h (145 mph), classifying Gay as a modern-day super cyclonic storm. Additionally, the agency estimated the cyclone's central pressure to have decreased to 930 mbar (hPa; 27.46 inHg). Around 1800 UTC, Gay made landfall over a sparsely populated area near Kavali, India, in Andhra Pradesh. Upon coming ashore, the storm's eye was about 20 km (12 mi) wide, with gale-force winds within 95 km (60 mi) of the center. Now over land, Gay no longer had access to warm waters, causing it to weaken to a tropical storm less than twelve hours after this landfall. The storm continued to deteriorate while moving across India, before it completely dissipated over Maharashtra on 10 November.

== Impact and aftermath ==
=== Gulf of Thailand ===
The most powerful storm to affect the Gulf of Thailand in more than thirty-five years, Gay produced 6–11 m (20–36 ft) swells which caught many ships in the region off-guard. At least 16 vessels were reported missing by 5 November, including the 106 m (348 ft) Unocal Corporation oil drilling ship Seacrest. According to survivors, the vessel received no warning of the developing typhoon. Just when all crew members were about to abandon ship, the eye passed over. Winds fluctuated violently and changed direction, preventing the ship from remaining stabilized despite being within safe operating limits. The vessel abruptly capsized with all 97 crew members on board during the overnight hours of 3 November, before any lifeboats could be deployed. Initial rescue attempts on 4 November were hampered by rough seas. Two days after the sinking, four rescue ships and two helicopters in the region were searching for survivors; four people were rescued from the wreckage on 6 November. Divers from the Thai Navy were sent to search the capsized vessel for anyone trapped inside. Of the crew, only six survived; 25 bodies were recovered, and the remaining 66 members were presumed dead. Losses from the sinking of the Seacrest totaled $40 million. Another 20 cargo and fishing ships sank during the storm, resulting in 140 fatalities.

=== Thailand ===
Effects in Thailand

Casualties and damage
Province	Deaths	Missing	Damage
Chumphon	446	0	$439,736,924
Prachuap Khiri Khan	19	84	$7,810,000
Ranong	21	0	$3,550,000
Pattani	2	0	N/A
Surat Thani	66	0	$2,778,250
Rayong	3	50	$1,259,023
Phetchaburi	1	0	$879
Trat	0	0	$63,008
Offshore	184	0	$1,210,938
Seacrest	91	0	$40,000,000
Total	833	134	$496,511,534

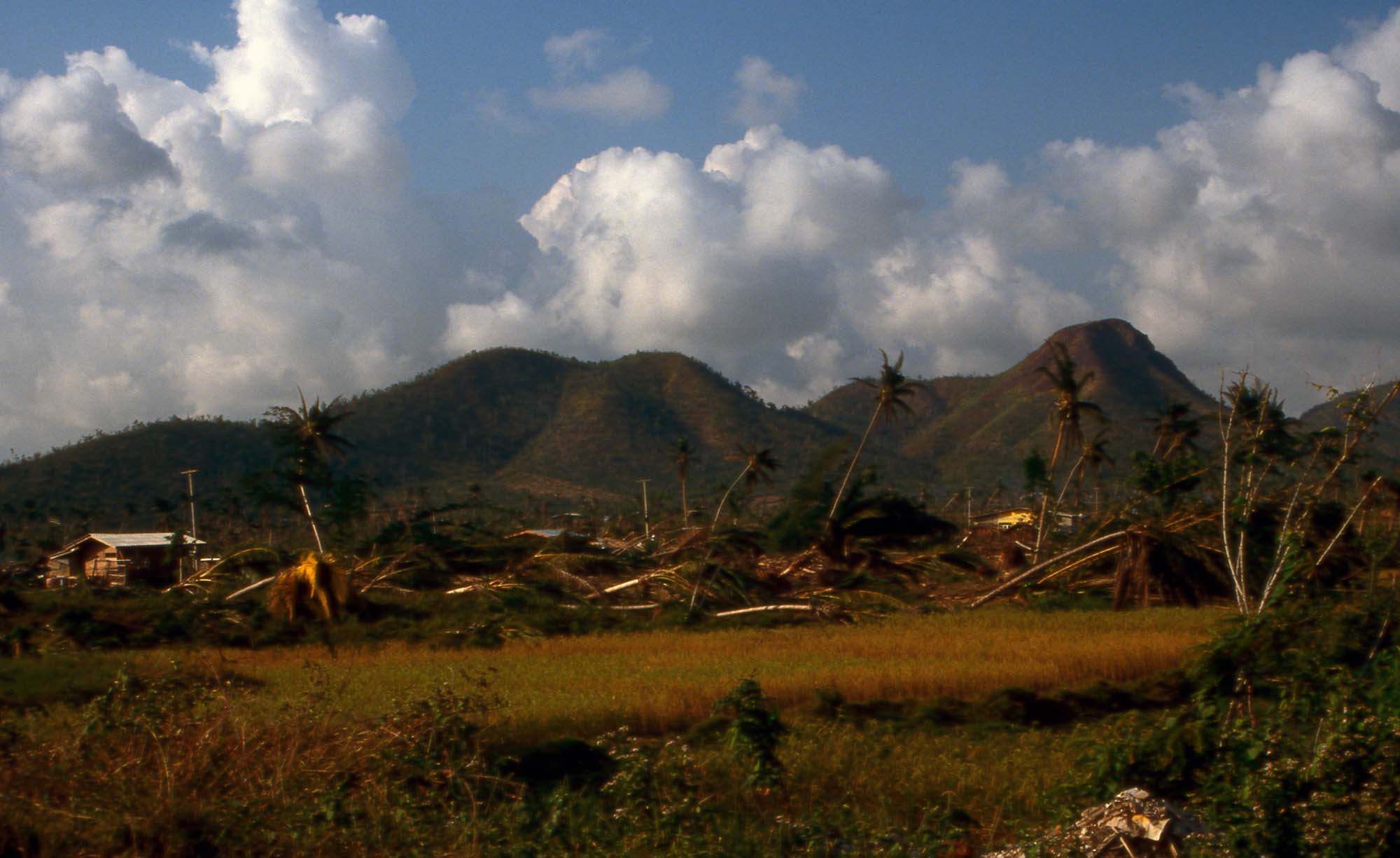
Downed trees and damaged buildings in Chumphon Province

Striking Thailand with unprecedented strength, Typhoon Gay caused catastrophic damage across many of its provinces. Areas between Chumphon and Rayong provinces were severely affected by heavy rains, high winds and large swells. Rainfall amounts peaked at Chumphon, where 7.64 inches (194 mm) fell during the cyclone's passage. Widespread disruption of communication and electricity occurred in most areas south of Bangkok; many households remained without power for weeks. Damaging winds uprooted numerous trees and power poles and toppled wooden houses built on stilts. Exacerbated by deforestation, flash flooding triggered by the storm damaged or destroyed thousands of homes and caused at least 365 fatalities. Several towns and villages across Chumphon province were devastated, and one of the destroyed villages "looked like it had been bombed" according to the Bangkok Post. Entire districts were reportedly "flattened" in Chumphon and Prachuap Khiri Khan provinces. The typhoon destroyed many schools across Chumphon and Surat Thani provinces, many of which were constructed of wood. All structures close to the storm's path had their windows and doors blown out, and some multi-story buildings lost their upper floors. A few schools constructed from reinforced concrete sustained little damage. More than a thousand roads and 194 bridges were damaged or washed away. At the height of the floods, over 250,000 hectares (620,000 acres) of land were underwater. Onshore, 558 fatalities were attributed to the storm, and another 44 died just offshore. Throughout Thailand, approximately 47,000 homes were damaged or destroyed, and more than 200,000 people were affected, of which about 153,000 were left homeless. Monetary losses reached 11 billion baht (US$456.5 million), ranking Gay as one of the costliest disasters in the country's history.

Within a week of the storm's passage, the Government of Thailand began distributing relief goods to residents throughout the affected provinces. Despite the effort by the government, 2,500 people from Pa Thiew and Tha Sae demonstrated for additional and more intensive aid on 9 November. These protests were soon dispersed. Following considerable criticism for downplaying the impact of the typhoon, Prime Minister Chatichai Choonhavan delayed his visit to the United States to oversee relief efforts. By 15 November, the United States pledged to donate US$25,000 for recovery operations. Telephone connection was restored from Bangkok to Prachuap Khiri Khan by this time; however, areas further south remained disconnected. Generators were brought in to keep hospitals and government offices running since much of Chumphon Province remained without electricity for more than two weeks. As the scale of damage became more apparent, a request for international aid was made on 17 November to the United Nations Disaster Relief Organization. Upon the announcement of the request, six countries pledged to provide nearly US$510,000 in funds collectively. Agriculture across Surat Thani Province was severely affected by the typhoon in the long-term as well. In the four years following Typhoon Gay, land use for orchards, rubber, and oil palm plantations decreased from 33.32 percent to 30.53 percent. Additionally, rice paddy coverage decreased from 22.96 percent to 13.03 percent.

Following post-storm surveys, it was determined that most of the severely damaged schools had been built improperly – building codes in Thailand mandate that structures withstand up to 120 kgf/m^{2} of pressure from winds. In the years following the typhoon, studies determined how best to rebuild: reinforced concrete structures that can last fifty years.

=== India ===
After crossing the Malay Peninsula, Gay moved through the Andaman Islands on 6 November. As a precautionary measure, all air and sea traffic were suspended to the region. Winds in excess of 120 km/h (75 mph) battered North Andaman Island, causing two structures to collapse. A few days before the cyclone made landfall, officials in Andhra Pradesh began evacuating roughly 50,000 residents along the coast and stockpiled relief goods. Some people were forced to leave vulnerable locations in the Visakhapatnam and Srikakulam districts. Local meteorologists warned that the storm was comparable to a cyclone in 1977 that killed more than ten thousand. Striking the southern coast of Andhra Pradesh, Gay produced wind gusts estimated at 230 km/h (145 mph). Along the coast, a storm surge of 3.5 m (11 ft) inundated areas up to 3 km (1.9 mi) inland, washing away numerous structures. About 20 km (12 mi) outside of Kavali, a 91 m (299 ft) tall, steel lattice microwave tower collapsed after experiencing winds estimated at 142 km/h (88 mph). Transportation and communication across the region was disrupted and 20,000 homes were damaged or destroyed, leaving at least 100,000 people homeless. Nearly every structure in Annagaripalem were severely damaged or destroyed. Offshore, 25 fishermen drowned near Machilipatnam after ignoring warnings to return to port. Throughout Andhra Pradesh, 69 fatalities and ₹410 million (US$25.3 million) worth of damage was attributed to Gay. In the months after the storm, concrete shelters were built to house displaced persons.

== See also ==
- List of the most intense tropical cyclones in the North Indian Ocean basin
- Tropical Storm Harriet (1962) – deadliest tropical cyclone to impact Thailand
- Cyclone Forrest (1992)
- Typhoon Durian (2006)
- Tropical Depressions Wilma and BOB 05 (2013)
- Tropical Storm Podul (2013)
- Cyclone Senyar (2025) – the third-deadliest tropical cyclone to ever affect Thailand
