= Seacrest =

Seacrest is a surname. Notable people with the surname include:

- Bernadette Seacrest (born 1965), American vocalist
- Ryan Seacrest (born 1974), American radio personality, television host, and producer
- Susan Seacrest (born 1953), American environmental activist and teacher

== See also ==
- Seacrest, Florida
- Secrest
- Drillship Seacrest
