= Steve Amick =

American novelist and short story writer

- Born: February 16, 1964 (age 62); Ann Arbor, Michigan, U.S.
- Education: George Mason University (BA); St. Lawrence University (MFA)
- Website: steve-amick.com

Steve Amick (born February 16, 1964) is an American novelist and short story writer.

== Career ==
Steve Amick holds a BA in English-writing from St. Lawrence University and an MFA in creative writing from George Mason University.

Amick's novels The Lake, the River & the Other Lake and Nothing But a Smile were published by Pantheon Books. His most recent publication is the novel You Shall See the Beautiful Things published by Acre Books. His short story appearances include Zoetrope: All-Story, Playboy, The Southern Review, Michigan Quarterly Review, McSweeney’s, in the anthology The Sound of Writing, and on National Public Radio.

Amick teaches at the Pacific University Low-Residency MFA creative writing program.

== Works ==
=== Novels ===
- The Lake, the River & the Other Lake (2005)
- Nothing But a Smile (2009)
- You Shall See the Beautiful Things (2023)

=== Anthologies ===
- Kwame Dawes, ed. When the Rewards Can Be So Great: Essays on Writing and the Writing Life. Pacific University Press. (2016)
- Keith Taylor and Laura Kasischke, eds. Ghost Writers: Contemporary Ghost Stories from Michigan. Wayne State University Press. (2011)
- Robert Shapard and James Thomas, eds. New Sudden Fiction: Short-Short Stories From America and Beyond. W. W. Norton & Company. (2007)
- Kathryn Harrison and Jeff Kass, eds. Unsquared: Ann Arbor’s Writers Unleash Their Edgiest Stories and Poems. 826michigan. (2006)
- Alan Cheuse, ed. The Sound of Writing. Anchor/Doubleday. (1991)

== Awards ==
- Michigan Notable Book Award (2006 & 2010)
- Washington Post Book of the Year (2005)
- Michigan Quarterly Review's Lawrence Prize (2011)
- Dan Rudy Prize, George Mason University (1989)
