= Alice Mattison =

American writer

- Born: March 18, 1942 (age 84); New York City, U.S.
- Occupation: Writer
- Writing career
- Genres: short story, novel

Alice Mattison (born March 18, 1942) is an American novelist and short story writer.

== Life ==
Mattison was born in Brooklyn and attended Queens College and Harvard University, where she received a doctorate in literature. She has lived in New Haven, Connecticut since the 1970s. She has taught fiction in the Low-Residency MFA Program in Writing at Bennington College since 1995 and at the Fine Arts Work Center in Provincetown, MA. Mattison has also taught at Brooklyn College, Yale University and Albertus Magnus College.

Mattison and the poet Jane Kenyon met when both published books with the cooperative press Alice James Books, and forged a close friendship and working relationship. Mattison has written about their friendship and mutual influence in an essay published in the Michigan Quarterly Review, entitled "Let It Grow in the Dark Like a Mushroom: Writing with Jane Kenyon."

== Career ==
Mattison began her career as a poet, publishing a collection of poems in 1980. She began writing short stories in the 1980s. Her first collection of stories, Great Wits, was published in 1988, and her first novel, Field of Stars, in 1992.

Mattison's writing has been characterized in a review of "When We Argued All Night" (The New York Times Sunday Book Review): "Her prose is so crisp that along with all the pleasures of fiction she manages to deliver the particular intellectual satisfactions of an essay or a documentary."

== Selected works ==
Books

- "Conscience," (novel), Pegasus, 2018
- "The Kite and the String", (craft), Viking, 2016
- "When We Argued All Night", (novel), Harper Perennial, 2012.
- "Nothing Is Quite Forgotten in Brooklyn" (novel) Harper Perennial, September, 2008.
- "In Case We’re Separated: Connected Stories" William Morrow/HarperCollins, October, 2005; New York Times Notable Book, 2005. Paperback, Harper Perennial, 2006.
- "The Wedding of the Two-Headed Woman" (novel) William Morrow/HarperCollins, August, 2004. Paperback, Harper Perennial, 2005.
- "The Book Borrower" (novel) 1999, William Morrow and Co. Paperback, Harper Perennial, 2000. Reissued, HarperPerennial, 2008; New York Times Notable Book, 1999.
- "Men Giving Money, Women Yelling" (intersecting stories), Morrow, 1997. Paperback, Quill, 1998; New York Times Notable Book, 1997.
- "Hilda and Pearl" (novel) Morrow, 1995; large print edition, Thorndike Press, 1995. Paperback, Harper Perennial, 2001.
- "The Flight of Andy Burns" (short stories), Morrow, 1993.
- "Field of Stars" (novel) Morrow, 1992.
- "Great Wits" (stories) Morrow, 1988. Paperback, Penguin,1990.
- "Animals" (poems) Alice James Books, 1980.

Edited book

- As I Sat On The Green: Living Without a Home in New Haven (co-editor with Lezley TwoBears and Patricia Benedict); 2000, Citizens’ Project and Melville Charitable Trust.

Stories in journals

- “Raw Edge” Threepenny Review, Summer, 2013.
- “The Vandercook” Ecotone, 2011.
- “Brooklyn Circle” The New Yorker, November 12, 2007
- “The Bad Jew” Glimmer Train, Fall, 2005
- “Election Day” Michigan Quarterly Review, Summer, 2005
- “In The Dark, Who Pats The Air” Shenandoah, Spring/Summer, 2005
- “The Odds It Would Be You” Threepenny Review, Spring, 2005
- “Pastries At the Bus Stop” Ms. Magazine, Spring, 2005

== Awards ==
- Many of Alice Mattison's short stories have been cited for distinction in The Best American Short Stories (1986, 1987, 1988, 1990, 1995, 1996, 1998, 2000, 2006.)
- Four of her short stories have been awarded the Pushcart Prize, including “Three Bartlett Pears” (Pushcart Prize XXXVI, 2012), "The Odds It Would Be You" (Pushcart Prize XXXI, 2007), "I Am Not Your Mother" (Pushcart Prize XXIX, 2005) and "The Disappearing Teapot” (Pushcart Prize XXIV, 2000.)
- "The Vandercook", was included in The PEN/O. Henry Prize Stories, 2012.

Mattison's short story, "Election Day", was awarded the Lawrence Foundation Prize from Michigan Quarterly Review in 2005.

Mattison's novel, In Case We’re Separated, won the Connecticut Book Award for fiction in 2006.

== Interviews ==
- (with Sarai Walker), “The Ecotone Interview With Alice Mattison”
- (with Sarah Anne Johnson), “An Interview with Alice Mattison”, Writer’s Chronicle, December, 2006.
- (with Sarah Anne Johnson),The Very Telling: Conversations with American Writers, UPNE, 2006.
