= Monika Samtani =

American broadcast journalist

- Occupation: Broadcast journalist
- Notable credit(s): anchor, WUSA9
- Website: www.msmedia.tv/monika_samtani/

Monika Samtani is an American broadcast journalist.

== Career ==
Samtani attended George Washington University and obtained a Bachelor of Arts in Radio and Television Communications. She was a fill-in disc jockey on Essex Radio/Breeze AM in 1989. She joined as a morning traffic anchor on WUSA9 in 1997. She appeared in the film An American Affair (2008).

Samtani founded LAUNCH Network from 2011 to 2013, a networking organization for women entrepreneurs. In 2014, she started her company Ms. Media, with a focus on helping businesses and non-profits market themselves, including Sahara Deepika Foundation for Education In 2016, Samtani became a TEDx talker.

== Awards and honors ==
- Maryland’s Achievement in Public Information Awards, 2002
- Internet & Video Association (TIVA) D.C. Peer Awards, 2010
- Featured on the cover of Washington FAMILY Magazine
