= Kessler Motor Company =

Company

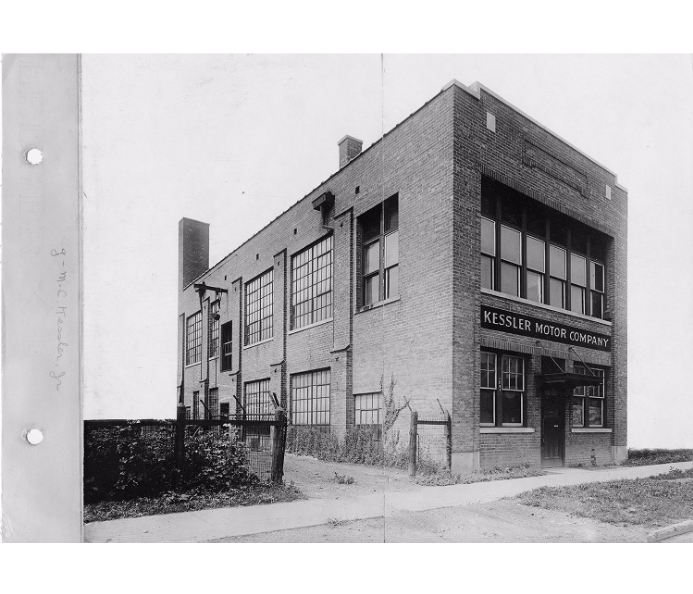
- Kessler-Detroit Motor Car Company Factory
- Industry: Automotive, Aerospace
- Founded: 1917 in Detroit, Michigan
- Founder: Martin C. Kessler
- Key people: Martin C. Kessler, William H. Radford, H. H. Scott
- Products: Automobiles, aircraft engines
- Brands: Kessler, Kess-Line

The Kessler Motor Company was a short-lived American manufacturer of aircraft engines and automobiles. The brand name for engines and automobiles was Kessler; also Kess-Line for some cars.

== History ==
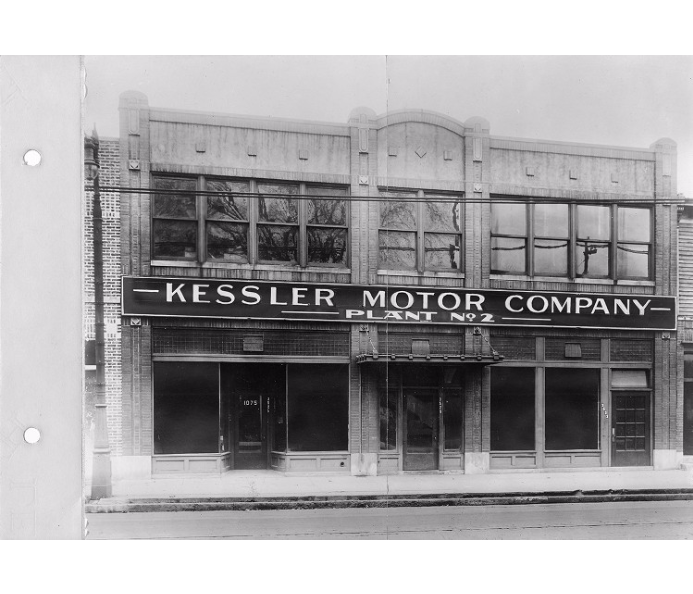
Kessler-Detroit Motor Car Company Factor, Plant Number Two

In 1907, Martin C. Kessler designed an automobile engine for the Chandler Motor Car company in Cleveland, Ohio. He then worked as an independent engineering consultant. In 1917, after several attempts, he founded the Kessler Motor Company in Detroit, Michigan. The company supplied engines for combat aircraft to the US government. It is unclear whether it was connected to the Liberty program. Kessler was president and CEO of the company. William H. Radford was appointed chief engineer and vice president.

=== Automobile manufacturing ===
With the end of World War I the demand for military engines ended, and like many similar companies, Kessler Motors turned to building automobiles. The first model, the Kessler Super-Charge Four, was announced in January 1920 and shown the following month at the Detroit Auto Show.

=== Super-Charge Motor ===
For the Super-Charge Four the company developed the Super-Charge Motor, a technically interesting engine for which both Kessler and Radford later claimed credit. It was a two-liter 4-cylinder inline engine with integrated compressor. It was innovative in incorporating a compression space into the crankcase; pressure was increased by the downward movement of the pistons. A more than respectable performance of 70 bhp (52.2 kW) was claimed, equalling that of the basic model of the Bugatti Type 35. The Ford Model T offered 20 bhp (15 kW). The company's advertising emphasized that the engine produced negligible carbon deposits.

== Automobile models ==
=== Kessler Super-Charge Four ===
Apart from the engine, the Kessler Super-Charge Four was a very conventional private car. Because of the company's limited resources, it was an assembled car, consisting of purchased components fitted together. The chassis consisted of a ladder frame with front and rear beam axles. The wheelbase was 117 inches (3,000 mm). The car was only available as a touring car and was a close copy of the then new Packard Single Six; the Super-Charge Four offered distinctly superior performance over the Packard's 52 bhp (39 kW) and a slight advantage in wheelbase over the Packard's 116 ins. / 2946 mm When first introduced, the Single Six cost $3640 as a touring car (and was soon reduced in price); the Super-Charge Four cost only $1995. Regardless, the Super-Charge Four flopped badly; by the end of 1921 only 16 vehicles had been produced. The reason is unclear, but may have been the engine.

=== Kess-Line Motors Company ===
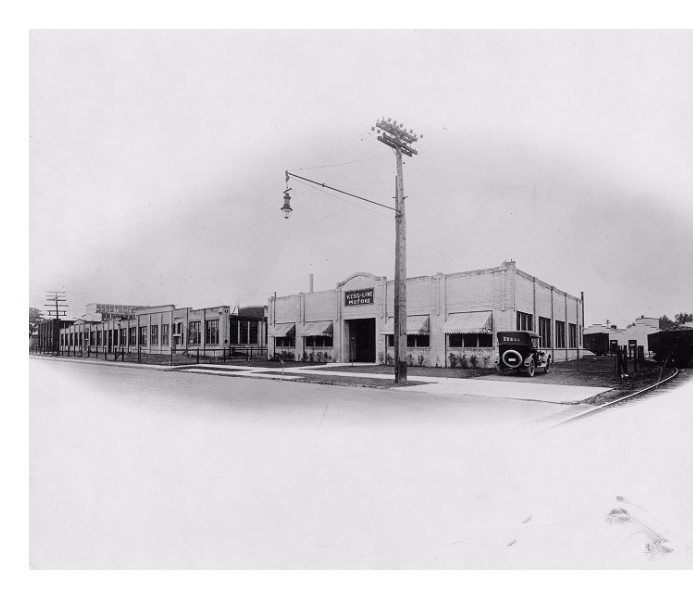
7.5x9.75 black and white photograph of the Kess-Line Motor Car Company located at 657 Lycaste Street

Kessler formed a subsidiary called the Kess-Line Motors Company to produce its next car under the Kess-Line marque. Again Kessler was president and CEO and Radford chief engineer and vice president. H. H. Scott, formerly of Fisher Body, was chief financial officer and secretary. A new production location was rented, the former facilities of Liberty Motor Car in Detroit. In that company's best year, 1921, 21,000 Liberty Sixes had been sold; thus the plant was far too large for Kessler unless the new car sold extremely well.

The Kess-Line 8 was also extremely reminiscent of a competitor: the engine hood and radiator grille very closely resembled those of the much more expensive Lincoln L. However, the Kess-Line, again available only as a touring car, had sportier lines than the massive Lincoln and "helmet" fenders—close to the wheel and turned out at the base, so that the profile recalled a Classical helmet. Instead of running boards, there was a nickel-plated step under each of the four doors, and the grille was also nickel-plated. The engine was an inline V8 offering 100 bhp (75 kW); a performance exceeded by very few production automobiles at the time, such as the compressor version of the Bugatti Type 35 or the Mercedes 24/100/140 PS. Of US cars, similar performance was offered only by, for example, the Finley Robertson Porter, which were produced in extremely limited numbers and offered 125 bhp; typical performance for US luxury cars was 80–90 bhp.

The Kess-Line 8 also failed to fulfil expectations; only 12 were built, according to one source only one.

== Later history ==
After the failure of the Kess-Line 8, the company did not make further attempts to market automobiles. Radford went to California to prepare for equipping Balboa cars with Kessler V8s, but the project did not advance beyond the prototype stage, and there are no further documented uses of the Kessler Super-Charge engine.

When the company was dissolved is unclear; there are mentions of it until at least 1927. In the 1930s Martin Kessler over-extended himself financially developing a 10-cylinder automobile.
