= Katja Kessler =

German journalist and author (born 1969)

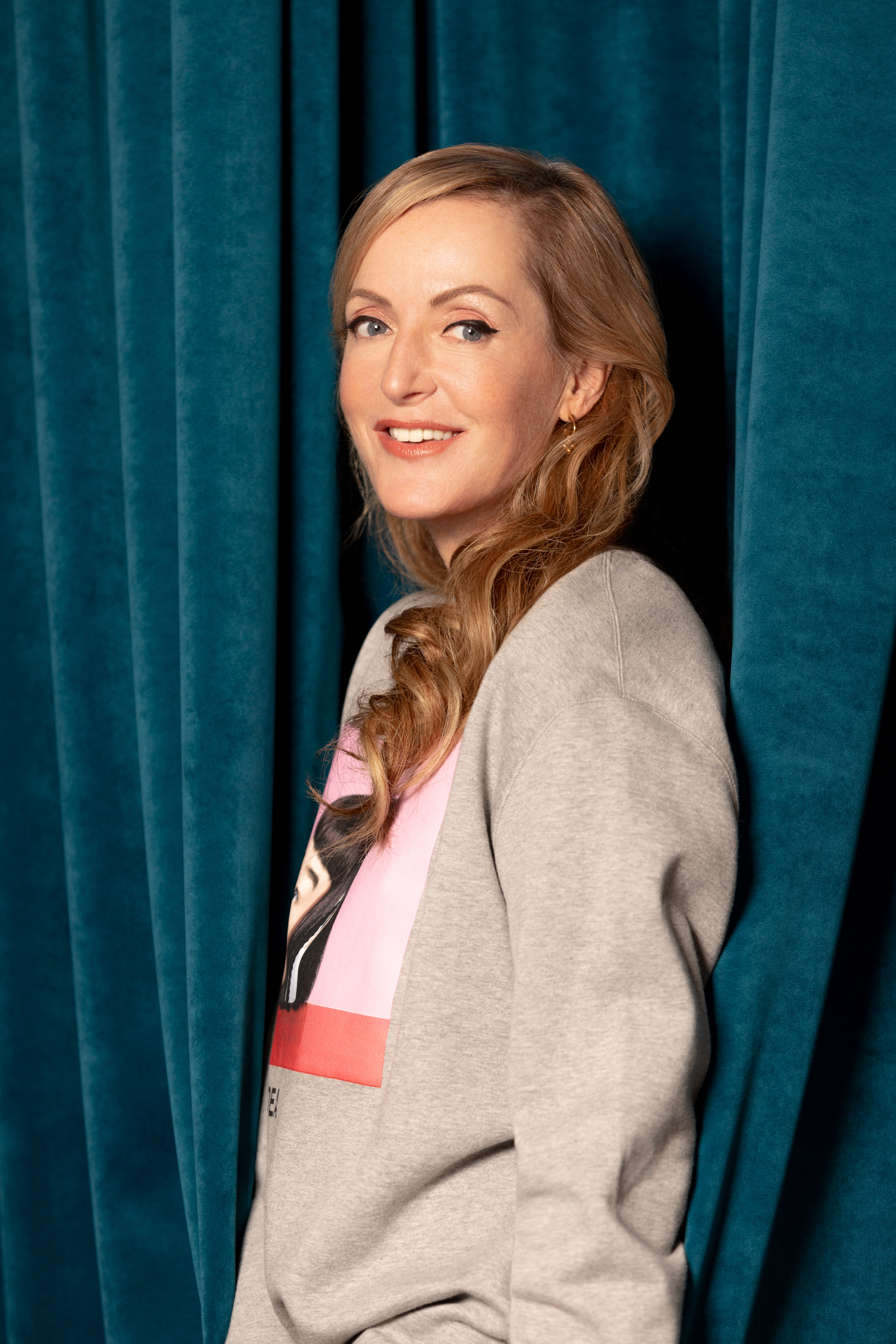
Image of Kessler

Katja Kessler (born 5 January 1969; Kiel) is a German journalist and author.

== Life and career ==
After Abitur at Kieler Gelehrtenschule, Kessler studied Dentistry at Kiel University. After a two-year sabbatical, she continued her studies in Hamburg and completed her doctorate in Dr. med. dent. with the 1997 thesis Iron loading and antioxidant status in patients with homozygous β-thalassemia using the chelator deferiprone.

Instead of taking over her father's practice, Kessler did an internship at Axel-Springer-Verlag and caused a sensation with her articles about nude pictures on the front page of the BILD-Zeitung. She was given her own column and reported on high society at home and abroad for four years. In 2002, Kessler married Kai Diekmann, then editor-in-chief of Bild and later editor-in-chief of the Bild group. The two have four children and live in Potsdam.

Kessler has also published in the FAZ, the Für Sie and the Welt am Sonntag and together with Dieter Bohlen wrote his biographies Nichts als die Wahrheit (2002) and Hinter den Kulissen (2003). For her work, she was awarded the Champagne Prize for Joie de Vivre and - together with Bohlen - the Goldene Feder. This prize was awarded because the book "was the first time that the feuilletons of renowned newspapers had dealt with the tabloid phenomenon". Her first novel Herztöne was published in 2007, followed in 2008 by Das Mami Buch: Schwangerschaft, Geburt und die zehn Monate danach, and in 2009 by Frag mich Schatz, ich weiß es besser, a novel in which she writes partly autobiographically about her marriage to Diekmann. On March 8, 2011, Kessler's laugh-out-loud stories Das Schatzi-Experiment oder Der Tag, an dem ich beschloss, meinen Mann zu dressieren were published. In 2014, she published Silicon Wahnsinn: Wie ich mal mit Schatzi nach Kalifornien auswanderte.

Kessler also appeared as a "parenting expert" on the RTL show Erwachsen auf Probe.

Since 2018, she has been self-employed as an interior designer. In November 2023, four of her interior design projects - the "Villa Meerestern" and "Das Kulm" (both Ostseebad Heringsdorf), the "Ullsteinhalle" in Berlin and the "H1" in Bielefeld - were nominated for the SBID Award in London, which was ultimately won by the Villa Meeresstern.

== Books ==
- with Dieter Bohlen: Nichts als die Wahrheit. Heyne Verlag, Munich 2002, ISBN 978-3-453-86143-5.
- Dieter Bohlen: Hinter den Kulissen. Random House Entertainment, Munich 2003, ISBN 978-3-7645-0173-0 (also available as an audio book with 5 CDs, BMG Berlin Musik, ISBN 3-89839-633-X).
- Herztöne, Diana Verlag, 2007, ISBN 978-3-453-29033-4
- Das Mami Buch: Pregnancy, Birth and the Ten Months After, Coppenrath Verlag, 2008, ISBN 978-3-8157-8001-5
- Frag mich, Schatz, ich weiß es besser!: Bekenntnisse einer Ehefrau, Diana Verlag, 2009, ISBN 978-3-453-35178-3
- Das Schatzi-Experiment oder Der Tag, an dem ich beschließen, meinen Mann zu dressieren, München: Diana Verlag, 2011, ISBN 978-3-453-35558-3
- Silicon Wahnsinn: Wie ich mal mit Schatzi nach Kalifornien auswanderte, Berlin: Marion von Schröder, 2014, ISBN 978-3-8437-0943-9
- Das muss Liebe sein, Bastei-Lübbe, 2016, ISBN 978-3-431-03946-7 With illustrations by Peter Böhling.
