= Kessler, West Virginia =

- Unincorporated community
- Location within West Virginia Location within the United States
- Coordinates: 37°59′06″N 80°40′08″W
- Country: United States
- State: West Virginia
- County: Greenbrier
- Elevation: 2,428 ft (740 m)
- Time zone: UTC-5 (Eastern (EST))
  - Summer (DST): UTC-4 (EDT)
- Area codes: 304 & 681
- GNIS feature ID: 1541170

Kessler is an unincorporated community in Greenbrier County, West Virginia, United States. Kessler is 2 miles (3.2 km) northeast of Rupert.
