= Lyndon Lawless =

American musician and music educator

Lyndon Kent Lawless is an American musician and music educator best known for his creation and leadership of the Ars Musica period instrument chamber orchestra (Ann Arbor 1971–86). He also developed and conducted the nationally known Youth Performing Arts School Philharmonia Orchestra (Louisville 1996–2006).

== Education ==
Lawless was born in 1945 in Tulsa, Oklahoma where he spent his childhood. His father was a high school band and orchestra teacher. Lawless studied violin, viola, and clarinet and was a member of the professional Tulsa Philharmonic viola section in his last two years of high school.

In 1963, he began his college career at the University of Michigan School of Music in Ann Arbor where he performed in the band (clarinet) the first three years and in the orchestra (viola) during his final year. In 1967, Lawless graduated with a Bachelor of Music Education. From there he went on to teach public school orchestra for two years on Long Island.

== Ars Musica and early music ==
In 1970, Lawless returned to Ann Arbor to found a semi-professional chamber orchestra. This group eventually became a professional ensemble performing 17th- and 18th-century music on period instruments. During his 18-year career in Ann Arbor, Lawless developed this chamber orchestra, Ars Musica, into a touring ensemble under prestigious New York management (Harold Shaw). At its height in 1985, the orchestra performed a fifty-concert season in concert halls from Chicago's Symphony Hall, to college and university series across the Midwest and Southeast, to three-concert series in both New York City and Washington, D.C.

Lawless' roles with Ars Musica encompassed artistic director, conductor, musical entrepreneur, and performer (on harpsichord, viola, and primarily baroque violin).

Another chamber ensemble co-founded by Lawless, the American Baroque Ensemble, toured for 26 days in Japan in the spring of 1988.

== Teaching career ==
In 1988, due to a dramatically escalating increase in the ongoing financial difficulties common to most non-profit artistic ventures, Lawless left the music business and began a seven-year career as bookkeeper and computer programmer for a small non-profit organization in Danville, Kentucky.

In the spring of 1996, at age 50, he became inspired by the film Mr. Holland's Opus to return to music as a teacher and began post-graduate work at Eastern Kentucky University at that time in order to gain a Kentucky teacher's certificate. Almost simultaneously, he was alerted by his EKU advisor that the orchestra job at the Youth Performing Arts School (YPAS) in Louisville was open. He applied and was appointed beginning with the 1996-97 school year.

He continued his work towards a master's degree at EKU mostly during the summers and received his Master of Music in conducting in December 2000. During his tenure at YPAS, the school's top orchestra, Philharmonia, was invited to appear at the Kentucky Music Educators Conference, the Southern Division MENC Conference (1999 in Tampa), the national meeting of the MENC (2000 in Washington, D.C.), the Midwest Clinic (1999 and 2004 in Chicago), and the first national conference of the American String Teachers Association (2003 in Columbus). They also had numerous performances recorded and broadcast by WUOL-FM in Louisville, appearing on National Public Radio's "From the Top". In June 2005, the YPAS Philharmonia performed in Carnegie Hall. As guest conductor, Lawless has conducted the Clark County (Las Vegas) High School Honor Orchestra, the Louisiana All-State Orchestra, and the Colorado All-State String Orchestra. He was also named the 2004 Kentucky High School Music Teacher of the Year and in 2007 received the Kentucky American String Teachers of America Distinguished Service Award.

In 2006, he stepped down as Director of the Orchestra Department at the Youth Performing Arts School in Louisville, Kentucky. During his ten-year stint (1996–2006) as teacher and conductor at that school, he developed the YPAS Philharmonia into a nationally acclaimed high school orchestra.

In the early spring of 2007, Lawless took on a temporary position teaching at Sprague High School in Salem, Oregon. He finished the last twelve weeks of the school year on emergency notice and took the school's Camerata and Symphony orchestras to the OSAA state competition, those groups each taking second place in their respective categories.

He was the Director of Orchestras at Chattahoochee High School in Alpharetta, Georgia from 2009 to 2014, again taking his top group to the Midwest Clinic in Chicago in 2012. Between 2018 and 2020, Lawless directed Camerata Northwest as part of the Pacific University String Project. Now retired, Lyndon Lawless lives with his wife in Portland, Oregon.
