= Friedrich August Kessler =

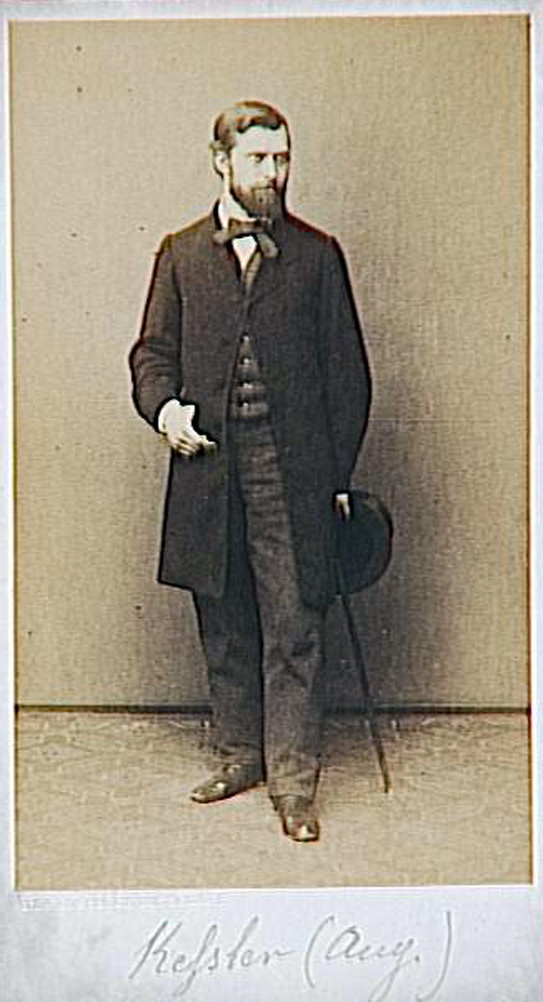
August Kessler, photograph by Arnold Overbeck, Gebr. G. & A. Overbeck in Düsseldorf

Friedrich August Kessler (30 December 1826 – April 1906) was a German landscape painter of the Düsseldorf school of painting.

== Life ==
Kessler received his first painting lessons from his father, Christian Friedrich Kessler (1799–1854). In 1841, he enrolled at the Düsseldorf Art Academy. There, he studied under landscape painter Johann Wilhelm Schirmer from 1843 to 1854. Kessler was a founding member of the artists' association "Malkasten" in Düsseldorf, where he resided as a freelance painter after his studies. For a time, he lived with Eugen Bracht, Fritz Ebel, and Carl Friedrich Harveng. He undertook study trips to various coastal, low mountain range, and Alpine landscapes, including the Teutoburg Forest, Hesse, Bavaria, Tyrol, Northern Italy, Switzerland, Holland, and Belgium. In 1854, writer Wolfgang Müller von Königswinter classified him as a "historical-stylistic landscaper" following Nicolas Poussin's theory of modes. From 1860 to 1892, he regularly exhibited at the Berlin Academy Exhibitions and occasionally at the Munich Glass Palace exhibitions. His son Walter, also a painter, did not gain significant recognition in Germany.

== Works (selection) ==
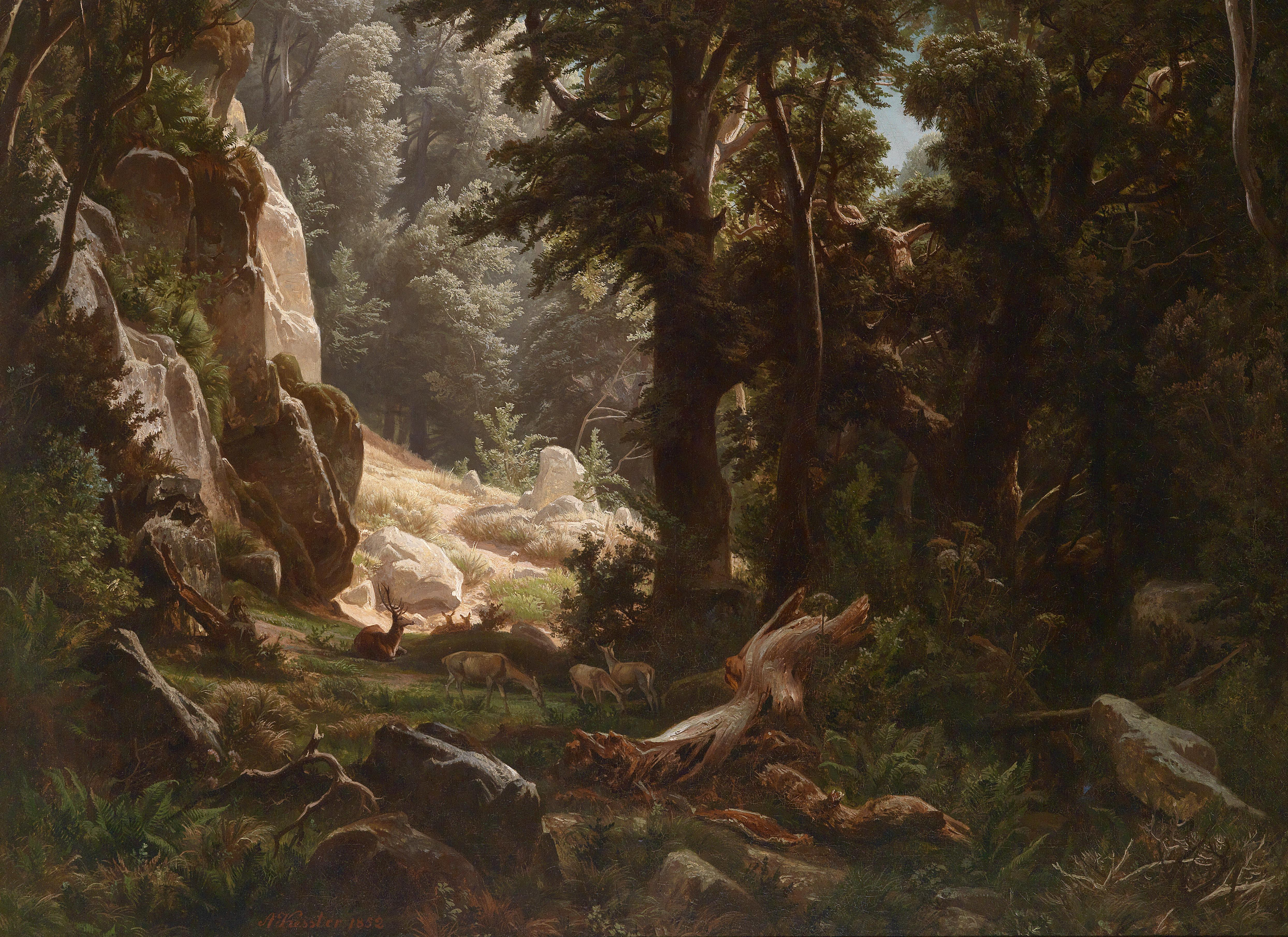
Red Deer in the Forest, 1852

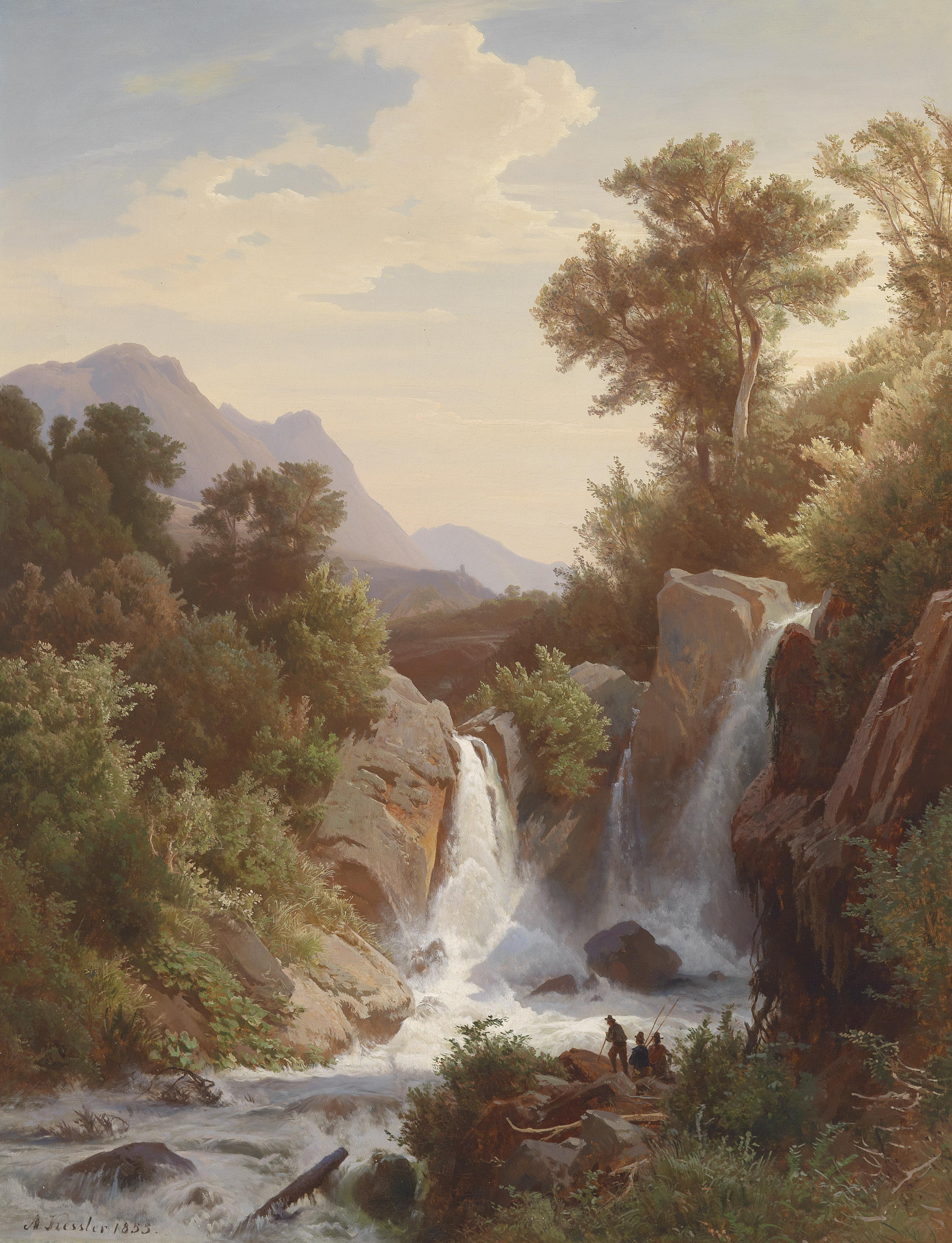
Angler at the Waterfall, 1853

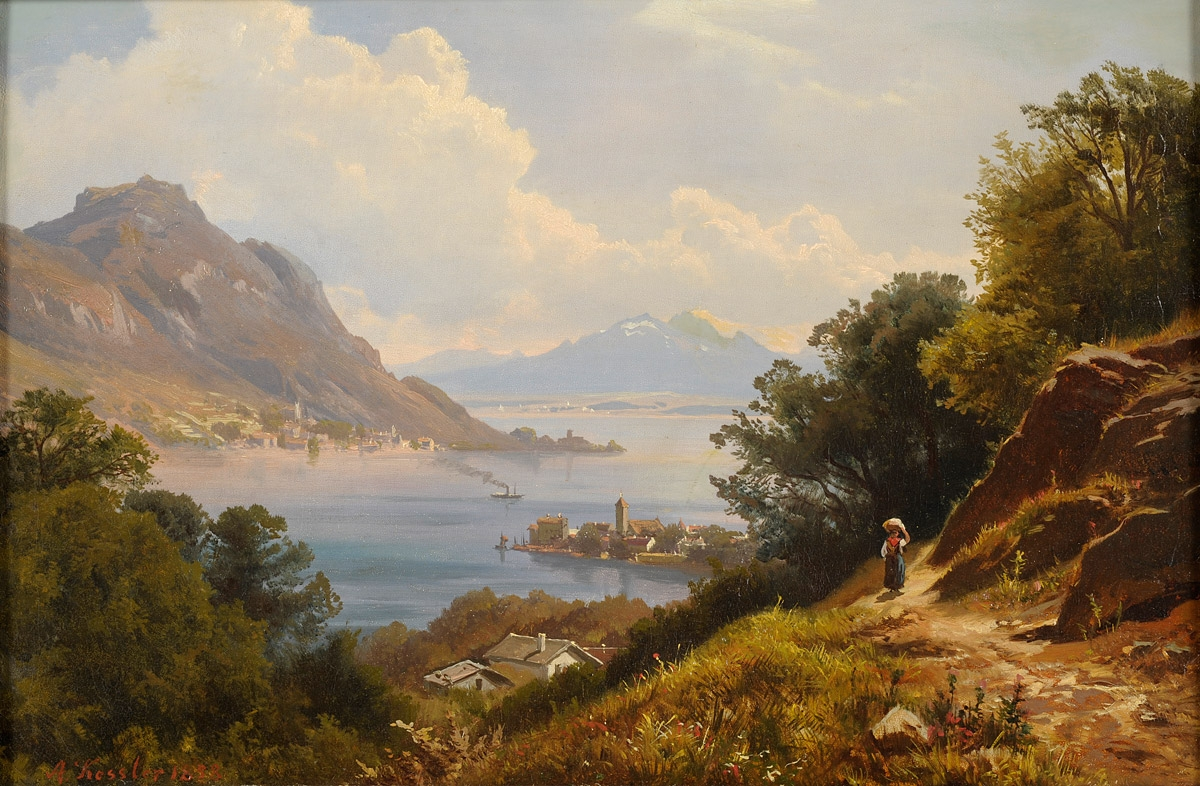
Seascape, 1858

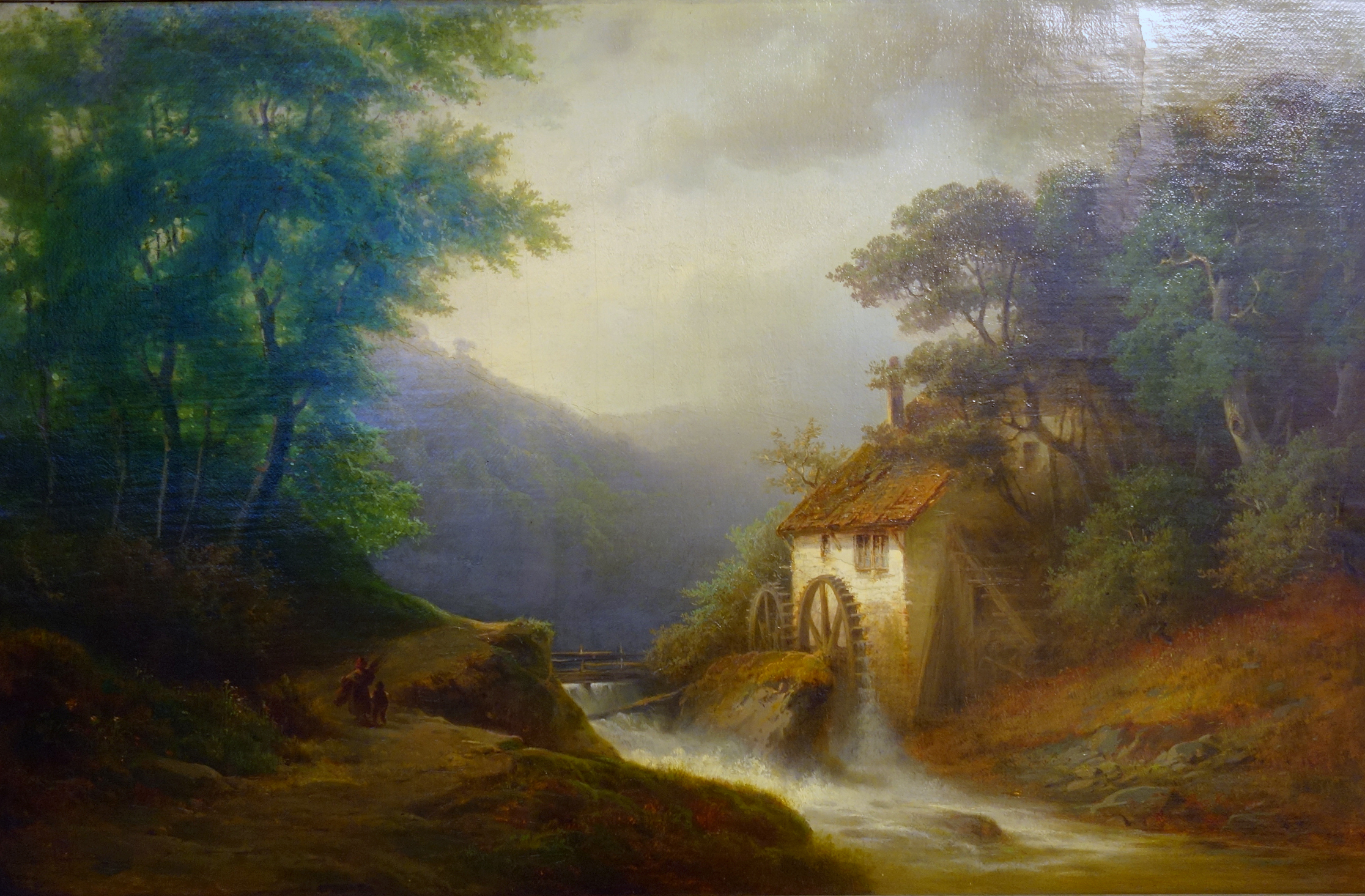
Mill on a Stream, 1860

Ships in a Storm at Sea, 1885

- German Forest Landscape with Wild Stream, 1842
- Motif from the Bergisches Land, 1846
- Hunter and Dog with Slain Deer in a Forest Clearing, 1848
- Red Deer in the Forest, 1852
- Angler at the Waterfall, 1853
- Externsteine, 1855
- Seascape, 1858
- Mill on a Stream, 1860
- Grafenberger Forest near Düsseldorf, 1861
- Return from the Hay Harvest, 1869
- Rest at the Mountain Lake, 1874
- Beach at Blankenberghe, 1882
- Ships in a storm, 1885
- Forest Clearing with Deer, 1885
- Seascape, 1886
- Autumn Morning in the Beech Forest, 1891
- Watermill
