= Platong gas field =

Oil and gas geological structure in the Gulf of Thailand

The Platong gas field (Thai: ปลาทอง, lit. "goldfish") is an oil and gas geological structure in the Gulf of Thailand. Platong is a part of the Pattani oil and gas basin. This basin has more than 35 oil and 30 gas and gas condensate fields.

The structure of the basin is divided by many synrift and postrift faults. Gas is found in the southern part of basin, oil in the north.

Platong was discovered by Union Oil of Thailand in 1979.
