= John Kessler (naval historian) =

German-American Seaman and historian

John Kessler (September 21, 1761 – March 17, 1840) volunteered for military service in the American Revolution. His combat sea service in the American Revolution produced valued notes, records, and articles used by historians and biographers to define early American naval history together with Captain John Barry's naval leadership and service securing America's independence from the British.

== Early life ==
Kessler, the second son of German immigrants Leonard Kessler and Mary Ritchouer Kessler, started with Philadelphia apprenticeships in wholesale dry goods, malting, brewing, and tobacco merchandising in 1772 before joining the American Revolution Military at age 16 in 1776. His initial service was part-time in a volunteer unit that later marched to Perth Amboy and Elizabeth Town. He continued his apprenticeship until he accepted privateer sea service.

== Privateer seaman on the brig Delaware ==
Young Kessler's initial service as an entry level privateer sailor proved to be the fortunate beginning of a long-term relationship, signing the muster rolls of the brig Delaware. Her captain, the Irish-born John Barry, had begun his sailing life at age 9 by signing on to his uncle's private ship as a cabin boy. He learned quickly, and at age 21 was selected to be captain of a small Philadelphia merchantman. Barry grew to identify with America as his country, and Philadelphia as his home. By the time the American Revolutionary War began, Barry was a seasoned mariner and received a captain's commission in the Continental Navy from the President of Congress, John Hancock, in March, 1776. On April 7, 1776, Captain Barry's brigantine Lexington captured the British sloop Edward. It was the Continental Navy's first combat victory.

In 1779, Barry was without a command in the Continental Navy; Congress permitted him to accept the captaincy of the privateer brig Delaware. John Kessler began his maritime career under Barry's tutelage. In Barry, the teenage Kessler acquired his best possible mentor; in Kessler, Barry found a loyal, smart understudy who became a trusted associate and friend for life. He promoted Kessler from landsman to steward, clerk, and later Captain of Marines. The Delaware’s cruise to Port au Prince, Haiti, resulted in the capture of two prize eligible vessels.

When the Delaware returned to Philadelphia, Barry returned to service in the Continental Navy, while Kessler remained with the privateer, whose command was transferred to Lieutenant James Collins. A subsequent voyage to St. Eustatia and Port au Prince returned to Philadelphia without incident.

On their next voyage to Port au Prince, the Delaware and her crew were captured by three British warships, HMS Phoenix, HMS Pomona and HMS Lowestoffe. Collins, Kessler, and their fellow sailors were greeted by their captor, Sir Hyde Parker, with: ”My Lads, you will now consider yourselves as belonging to his Britannic Majesty’s Ship Phoenix, and if you behave yourselves well you will be treated the same as the rest of the crew. But had I my will, I would hang every one of you for fighting against your King and Country.” Kessler was assigned to Pomona. He was treated well, but was soon imprisoned by the British in Kingston, Jamaica on July 15, 1780.

Collins, Kessler, and about 15 crewmembers were assisted by Lieutenant Collins’ brother, who worked in Jamaica and helped them escape their Kingston captors in a small vessel. They sailed to Port au Prince, and arrived there on September 27, 1780. Once ashore, they decided to seek passage to America separately. Kessler took passage on a 20 gun ship whose destination was Salem, Massachusetts.

== Midshipman and master mate on Alliance ==
A penniless, raggedly-clothed John Kessler arrived in Salem, Massachusetts on November 11, 1780. Having had no friend or contact in Salem, he learned that Captain Barry was captain of the 36-gun privateer Alliance docked in Boston. In spite of Kessler's shabby appearance, Barry recognized him immediately and gave him a hearty welcome. Desperately short of hands, Barry was as glad to see Kessler as he was glad to see Barry. Kessler accepted the position of acting midshipman aboard Alliance, thus beginning his service in the Continental Navy.

For the next two years, their service together on Alliance included engaging and capturing enemy ships of war on the high seas; safely transporting war leaders such as Marquis de Lafayette, Thomas Paine, and Colonel Laurens from America to France; overpowering a mutiny; and transporting desperately needed currency to America. Barry's courage, integrity, leadership, and sailing knowledge insured his, Midshipman Kessler's, and the Alliance’s survival under combat and severe weather. Kessler's duties expanded to ship's log keeper, allowing him to enter accounts of major naval combat activities.

On May 29, 1781, Alliance was engaged by two British sloops-of-war, HMS Atalanta and HMS Trepassey. Initially the Alliance was adrift by calm winds. The two British ships used their sweeps to maneuver themselves into advantageous positions off Alliance's stern. For three hours, their combined broadsides swept the deck and quarterdeck of the privateer, tearing into the rigging while inflicting numerous casualties. Kessler was wounded in the leg, and Barry was seriously wounded in the shoulder. Barry's loss of blood required his removal from the main deck but when his Lieutenant, Hoystead Hacker, suggested surrender, an enraged Barry emphatically declared that surrender would not be considered, and he demanded to be brought back to the Alliance's deck if Hacker had truly lost his will to keep fighting.

An emboldened Hacker resumed command and followed Barry's orders not to surrender. Soon the wind returned, allowing Alliance to sail and take control of the fight. In minutes, her broadsides changed the momentum of the battle. Trepassey's captain James Smyth was soon killed, and eventually Atalanta's captain Sampson Edwards surrendered both ships. Kessler brought Edwards aboard Alliance to Barry's cabin. When Edwards offered Barry his sword, he refused, simply saying “I return it to you, Sir – you have merited it and your King ought to give you a better ship – here is my cabin at your service, use it as if your own.” Barry sent Trepassey as a cartel to Halifax, Nova Scotia, while Atalanta was recaptured by the British three days after parting ways with Alliance. By the war's end, Barry had promoted Kessler to Master's Mate.

The Treaty of Paris signaled the end of the American Revolutionary War. Barry had captured the first enemy ship of the American Revolution and, on March 10, 1783, fought the last sea battle of the American Revolution. The Alliance’s arrival in Providence on March 25, 1783, signaled the end of Kessler's service in America's Continental Navy.

== Early chronicler of American navy history ==
Captain Barry's outside communications were direct and succinct. He had self-confidence and courage in his knowledge of the sailing ship and its environment, but was not self-promoting, or arrogant.

It would fall to future researchers and writers, to establish John Barry's exemplary war accomplishments and place in American naval history. Barry and Kessler had become trusted friends during America's struggle for independence. They both resided in the Philadelphia area in the years following the American Revolutionary War and maintained their friendship. After Barry's death, their mutual friend John Brown teamed with Kessler to write early sketches of Barry's life for a magazine publication, Port Folio. Kessler's autobiographical sketch and his writings on Barry are on file at the Pennsylvania State Archives. Since 1903, they have been used as a foundational reference for early American naval history and four biographers of Captain John Barry.

== Distinguished Philadelphia citizen ==
John Kessler's post-war business and government career began in Boston. He married Abigail Anderson on October 6, 1783. Abigail gave birth to their first son, John, on July 11, 1784. He first moved his small family and fledgling business activities to Waldeborough, Maine. He moved to Philadelphia in May, 1793, and initially established himself as a shopkeeper. From their marriage until her death on December 3, 1793, Abigail gave birth to a total of six children. Five of them died shortly after birth. Only their first son survived to maturity.

In May, 1795, Kessler married a widow, Martha Berrill Shriver. He gave up his shop keeping and applied his administrative and writing skills to assume valued administrative positions of responsibility in Philadelphia. In 1800 he was elected to the state legislature. this elevated the public's recognition of his administrative and financial talents that would offer many opportunities for future growth for the rest of his life.

Kessler became friends with steamboat co-inventor, clockmaker, and first coiner of the U. S. Mint – Henry Voigt. Voigt assisted David Rittenhouse with the construction and repair of an orrery for Princeton University. Voigt produced the surveying instrument used by U. S. Surveyor General, Isaac Briggs, to survey the Louisiana Purchase. His surveying instrument, inscribed “Henry Voigt Philadelphia”, was transferred to the Smithsonian National Museum of American History in 1891.

The Kessler and Voigt families became joined through marriage. Kessler's son, John, married Voigt's daughter, Catharine, at St. Michael's Lutheran Church in Philadelphia on August 28, 1808. Later, Kessler's niece, Maria Kessler, married Voigt's son Thomas.

Thomas Voigt, after an apprenticeship with his father, Henry, assumed leadership of his family's clock making business when his father was appointed by President Washington to be the first coiner of the first U.S. Mint. One of their customers was President Thomas Jefferson. In 1812, Thomas built a floor-to-ceiling clock for President Jefferson known as the Astronomical Case Clock. This clock is functional today and stands in President Jefferson's study at his home, Monticello. In 1816, under purchase order, Thomas constructed a large floor-to-ceiling clock for the U. S. Senate. It became known as The Ohio Clock and is in daily operation today near the main entrance to the U. S. Senate chambers.

John Kessler, died on March 17, 1840, and resides along with his wife, descendants, Henry, Maria, and Thomas Voigt at Laurel Hill National Park near Philadelphia, PA.

== Epilogue ==
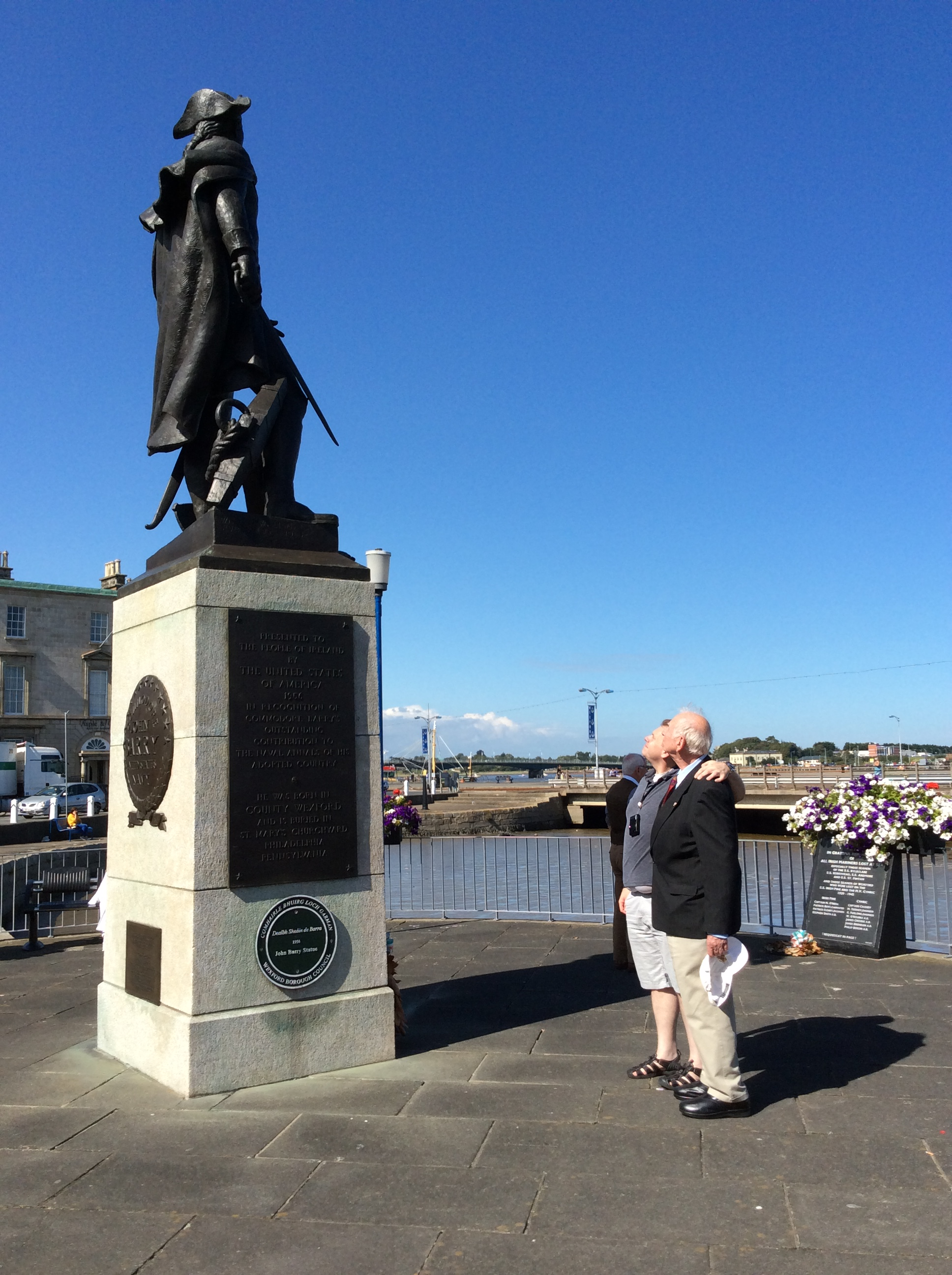
John Kessler's descendants visit Commodore John Barry's Statue at Wexford, Ireland.

After the American Revolution ended with the Treaty of Paris, Captain Barry focused on securing back pay for his sailors. He also engaged in private shipping cruises to rebuild his own finances. In 1794, President Washington recognized that the young nation needed an organized Navy in addition to its Army. He offered six distinguished officers a commission in the new U.S. Navy as Captain with relative seniority rank. Barry became the U.S. Navy's first and highest ranking Captain. This appointment elevated him to the fledgling U.S. Navy's equivalent to today's Chief of Naval Operations. After accepting Washington's appointment Captain Barry and shipbuilder Joshua Humphreys began building and staffing the first ships to comprise the U.S. Navy. Barry later assumed command of the large frigate, United States, and served with the honorary rank of “Commodore” of the navy's first squadron. He faithfully served his country under Presidents Washington, Adams, and Jefferson as its senior Navy officer until his death in 1803.

Commodore Barry's fellow sailor, John Kessler, and longtime Irish friend John Brown eulogized their Irish Catholic Commodore as “the first of patriots, and the best of men.”

President Dwight D. Eisenhower honored Commodore Barry's service to the United States with the donation of a statue of Commodore Barry to the people of Wexford, Ireland on September 14, 1956.

As a US Navy PT boat commander in World War II, President (then lieutenant, j.g.) John F. Kennedy was also wounded engaging his country's enemy - Japan. His blockade of Cuba, accompanied by his willingness to leave his opponents room to find a peaceful solution to the Cuba Missile Crisis, made sure that the event remained only a crisis. And, while his advisors debated strategy in the Oval Office, John Barry's cutlass – the same one he used while serving with John Kessler, hung on the office wall. When President Kennedy visited Ireland, he placed a wreath at Commodore Barry's statue at Wexford, Ireland on June 27, 1963.
