= Lillian Li =

Chinese American author

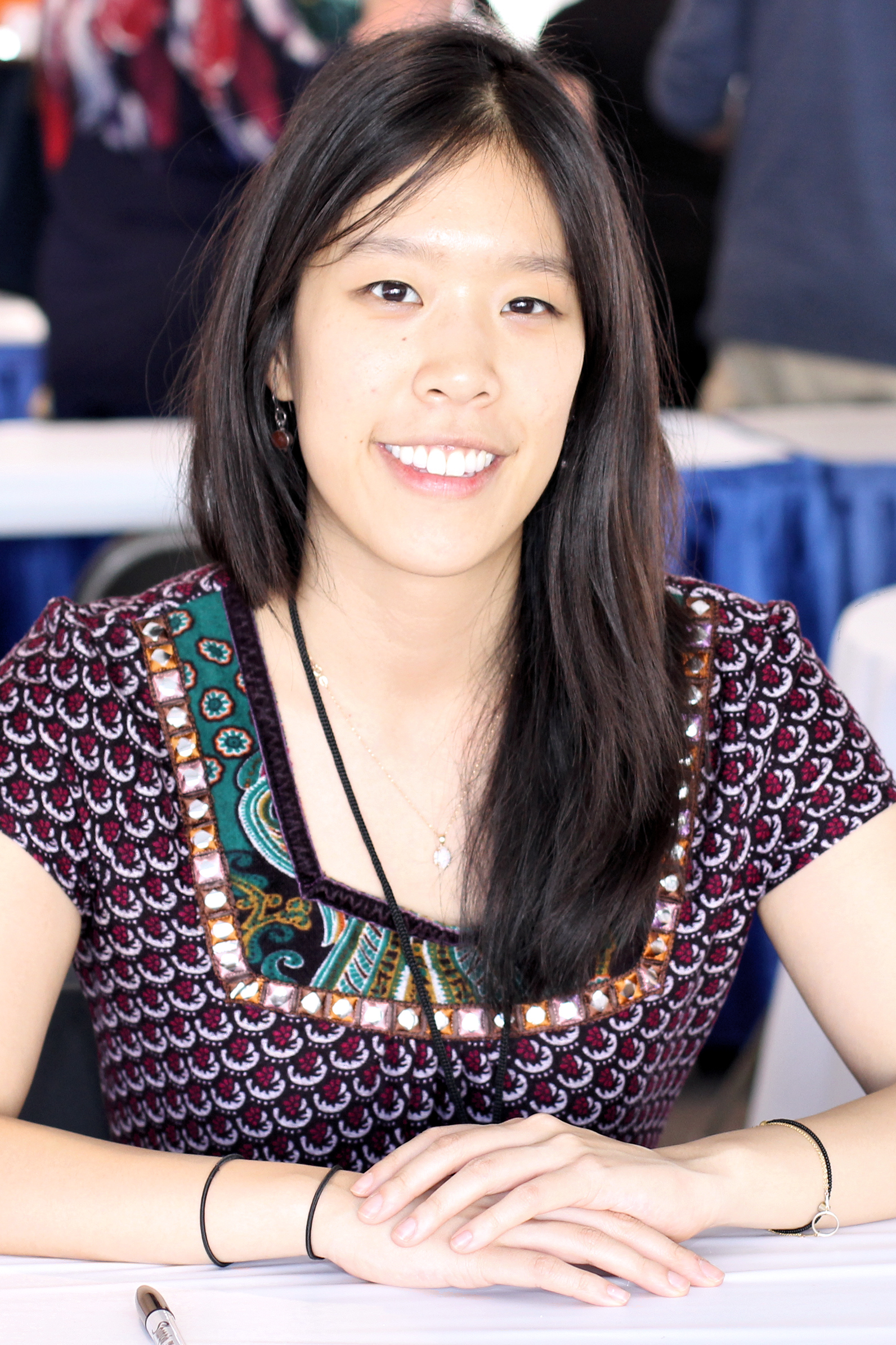
- Li at the 2018 Texas Book Festival.
- Born: Ann Arbor, Michigan, U.S.
- Education: Princeton University (BA); University of Michigan (MFA)
- Occupation: Author
- Years active: 2010s–present
- Known for: Fiction
- Notable work: Number One Chinese Restaurant
- Website: lillianliauthor.com

Lillian Li is a Chinese American author. Her novel Number One Chinese Restaurant was an NPR Best Book of 2018 and was longlisted for the Women's Prize for Fiction and the Center for Fiction First Novel Prize. She lives in Ann Arbor, Michigan.

== Early life ==
Li was born in Ann Arbor, Michigan, and grew up in Maryland. She received her Bachelor of Arts from Princeton University and her Master of Fine Arts in fiction from the University of Michigan's Helen Zell Writers’ Program.

== Career ==
Li has taught at the University of Michigan. She writes for the Michigan Quarterly Review. Her work has been featured in The New York Times, Granta, One Story, Bon Appétit, Travel + Leisure, The Guardian, Guernica, Glimmer Train, and Jezebel.

Number One Chinese Restaurant was her first novel. The inspiration for writing Number One Chinese Restaurant came from a summer Li spent working twelve-hour shifts at a Peking duck restaurant outside of Washington, D.C.

== Published works ==
- Li, Lillian (April 30, 2016). "Jackson". In Lewis, Brian James (ed.). Spark: A Creative Anthology. Vol. VII. Empire & Great Jones Little Press. ISBN 9781680730258.
- Li, Lillian (May 16, 2019). "Coach Ray". One Story. No. 253.
- Li, Lillian (February 25, 2020). Number One Chinese Restaurant. Henry Holt and Company. ISBN 9781250229328.
- Li, Lillian (February 17, 2026). Bad Asians: A Novel. Henry Holt and Company. ISBN 9781250363626.

== Awards ==
- Hopwood Award in Short Fiction
- Glimmer Train New Writer Award
