= Anna Rose Kessler Moore =

American singer-songwriter

Anna Rose
- Also known as: Menaga Miss
- Born: Anna Rose Kessler Moore; August 6 Ann Arbor, Michigan, U.S.
- Genres: Pop, rock, dance
- Occupations: Singer-songwriter, actress
- Instrument: Vocals
- Years active: 2011–present
- Website: www.menagamiss.com

Anna Rose (born August 6), known professionally as Menaga Miss, is an American pop rock singer, songwriter, and actress.

== Career ==
Anna Rose has opened for the Pointer Sisters, has been featured in FHM magazine on-line and its international counterparts, and has been nominated for a Hollywood Music in Media Award for best pop song, "Hard Driving Me Crazy".

== Discography ==
=== Albums ===
Title	Album details	Peak chart positions	
Title	Album details	US	CAN
Menaga Miss	Released: 2012	—	—

=== Singles ===
Year	Single	Peak chart positions					Certifications (sales thresholds)	Album
Year	Single	US	US Dance	US Pop	CAN	NZ	Certifications (sales thresholds)	Album
2011	"Hard Driving Me Crazy"	—	—	—	—	—		
2012	"Are You Gonna Dance"	—	—	—	—	—		

== Awards and nominations ==
Year	Nominated work	Award	Result
2011	Hard Driving Me Crazy	Hollywood Music in Media Award- Pop Genre	Nominated
