= Patricia Secrest =

American politician

Patricia Secrest is a former American Republican politician who served in the Missouri House of Representatives.

Born in Ann Arbor, Michigan, she attended University of Missouri and Washington University in St. Louis. In 2004, she ran to become lieutenant governor of Missouri, but she was defeated in the Republican primary by Peter Kinder. Secrest grew up in southwest Missouri and previously worked as a public school teacher and small business owner.
