= Michigan Quarterly Review =

American literary magazine

- Spring 2021 issue cover
- Discipline: Literary journal
- Language: English
- Edited by: Khaled Mattawa

Publication details
- History: 1962–present
- Publisher: University of Michigan (United States)
- Frequency: Quarterly

Standard abbreviations
- ISO 4: Mich. Q. Rev.

Indexing
- ISSN: 0026-2420 (print); 1558-7266 (web)
- LCCN: 67000232
- OCLC no.: 1757375

Links
- Journal homepage; Online archive; Online archive (from December 1998)

The Michigan Quarterly Review (MQR) is an American literary magazine founded in 1962 and published at the University of Michigan, Ann Arbor.

The quarterly publishes art, essays, interviews, memoirs, fiction, poetry, and book reviews as well as writing "in a wide variety of research areas", according to its Web site.

Starting in 1979, with a special issue on the subject of "The Moon Landing and Its Aftermath", one issue each year is given over entirely to a special theme. MQR's special issues include "The Automobile and American Culture," "Detroit: An American City," "Contemporary American Fiction," "The Female Body," "The Male Body," and "Bridges to Cuba".

In recent years the magazine has published nonfiction by Margaret Atwood, Carol Gilligan, David M. Halperin, Douglas Hofstadter, Maxine Hong Kingston, Toni Morrison, Joyce Carol Oates, Amos Oz, Richard Rorty, John Updike, William Julius Wilson and Dimitris Lyacos and fiction by Sergio Troncoso, Elizabeth Gaffney, Bonnie Jo Campbell, Alice Mattison, Garth Greenwell, Peter Mountford, Kalisha Buckhanon, Eileen Pollack, Peter Orner, Douglas Trevor, Steve Amick, Corinne Demas, Lauren Belfer, and Jacob Appel.

== Awards and recognition ==
The magazine's contents are often reprinted in prize anthologies, textbooks, magazines such as Harper's and the Utne Reader. The Best American Poetry series frequently reprints poems that originally appeared in Michigan Quarterly Review. The magazine won the Utne Reader Award for "Writing Excellence" in 2001.

== Lawrence Foundation Prize ==
Since 1978, the $2,000 Lawrence Prize in fiction is awarded annually to the best story published in MQR that year. Past winners include Charles Baxter, Paul Bowles, Susan Dodd, Clark Blaise, Sena Jeter Naslund, Rebecca Makkai, Alice Mattison, and Lynne Sharon Schwartz. The prize is sponsored by University of Michigan alumnus and writer Leonard S. Bernstein, a trustee of the Lawrence Foundation of New York.

- Past judges and winners:
- 2010–Shimon Tanaka, winner ("Destruction Bay")
- 2011–Steve Amick, winner ("In Casimir’s Shoes")
- 2012–Rebecca Makkai, winner ("Cross")
- 2013–Cody Peace Adams, winner ("Victory Chimes")
- 2014–Courtney Sender, winner (“We Can Practice Starts”)
- 2015–Alyson Hagy, winner ("Switchback")
- 2016–Ruchama King Feuerman, winner ("Kill Fonzie)
- 2017–Polly Rosenwaike, judge; Hananah Zaheer, winner (“In the Days of Old Things”)
- 2018–Michael Byers, judge; Elizabeth Gaffney, winner ("Six-X")
- 2019–Laura Kasischke, judge; Sean Gill, winner ("Dignity and Urgency in Edinburgh and London")
- 2020–Lillian Li, judge; Aya Osuga A., winner ("Kappa")
- 2021–Urvi Khumbat, judge; Naomi Shuyama-Gómez, winner ("The Commander's Teeth")

== See also ==
- List of literary magazines
