= Allen Creek (Huron River tributary) =

Location
- Country: United States
- State: Michigan
- County: Washtenaw
- City: Ann Arbor

Physical characteristics
- Mouth: Huron River
  - coordinates: 42°17′24″N 83°44′45″W
- Basin size: 5.21 sq mi (13.5 km^{2})
- Discharge
  - minimum: 0 cubic feet per second (0 m^{3}/s)
  - maximum: 2,000 cubic feet per second (57 m^{3}/s)

Allen Creek (also known as Allen's Creek) is a tributary of the Huron River in Ann Arbor, Michigan. Formerly an above-ground stream, the creek was converted into a series of underground drains and pipes during the 1920s, with only small stretches of the original channel still visible. The main stem runs from Pioneer High School and the University of Michigan golf course and runs north parallel to the Ann Arbor Railroad, draining into the Huron just downstream of Argo Dam. About 96% of the watershed is occupied by urban areas, with the many impervious surfaces leading to occasional flooding from stormwater runoff. No fish, aquatic insects, or mussels can live in the creek, and consistently high quantities of the fecal bacteria E. coli are present, rendering even partial bodily contact unsafe.

Named in 1824 for Ann Arbor co-founder John Allen, the creek initially served as a source of drinking water in a largely agricultural area. Industrial and residential developments across the 19th and early 20th centuries led to increased amounts of impervious surfaces and worsened water quality, leading the main stem of the creek to be buried in 1926. Periodic attempts to open up parts of the creek to the surface as part of a greenway have circulated since the 1980s. The city of Ann Arbor released a master plan for an Allen Creek Greenway along its course in 2017, but does not plan to unearth the stream, lacking ownership over any large areas of the stream channel.

== Hydrology ==
View of the Allen Creek outlet from across the Huron River

Allen Creek is a network of underground pipes and storm drains which feeds into the Huron River in Ann Arbor, Michigan. Formerly an above-ground creek network, it was buried underground in 1926 to serve as a drainage system. Only a few small stretches of the original creek channel remain above ground. The main stem of the creek begins near Pioneer High School and crosses through the University of Michigan golf course before turning north and running along the western edge of Downtown Ann Arbor, entering into the Huron immediately downstream of Argo Dam. Portions of the buried creek are within the right-of-way of the Ann Arbor Railroad, off-limits to pedestrians, while others are within private mixed-use properties and storage lots.

The Allen Creek drainage basin measures 5.21 square miles (13.5 km^{2}) in area, all within the city of Ann Arbor. About 96% of the watershed is occupied by urban residential and commercial zones, with only about 50 acres (20 ha) of intact natural areas within parks such as Eberwhite Woods and Miller Nature Area. About 55% of the drainage area is covered by impervious surfaces, which would severely impact biological diversity even for an exposed creek. Stormwater runoff on impervious surfaces such as parking lots pick up salt, oil, bacteria, and phosphorus and drain them into the Huron via Allen Creek.

The flow rate of the Allen Creek outlet pipe on the Huron is highly variable: although there is no flow at all much of the time, peak flows can exceed 2,000 cubic feet (57 m^{3}) per second following major storms. The system is not large enough to handle peak flows during large storms, resulting in regular backups and flooding in several areas of Ann Arbor.

=== Biology and water quality ===
No fish, aquatic insects, or mussels can live in the pipe network, although some fish have occasionally swum up the pipes from the Huron River. Consistently high quantities of the fecal bacteria E. coli are found in the creek, rendering even partial bodily contact unsafe, although levels declined slightly over the 2010s. Phosphorus levels in the stream network are the highest of any tributary to the middle reaches of the Huron, while conductivity (a measure of salts in the water) is also highly elevated, indicating unknown sources of pollution. The level of total suspended solids (a measure of turbidity) reaches very high levels following storms, rising to as high as 197 mg/L.

Nitrate and nitrite levels are both below the Environmental Protection Agency's Maximum Contaminant Levels for surface water contaminants. pH levels are also within the typical natural range for surface waters. Between April and September, the water temperature of the creek varies between 41.0 and 79.3 °F (5.0 and 26.3 °C), with 60.8 °F (16.0 °C) as the median level. No statistically similar trend in temperature levels occurred over surveys between 2014 and 2019. Dissolved oxygen levels are consistently above state health standards, and have risen slightly over this same period.

== Human history ==
Allen Creek was named in 1824 for John Allen, one of the co-founders of Ann Arbor alongside Elisha Rumsey. Allen and Rumsey used it as a source of drinking water during their initial settlement of the city. Initially a largely agricultural area, various industries were established in the flat valley adjacent to the creek over the 1800s, including breweries, a flour mill, a foundry, and tanneries. The Ann Arbor Railroad was built in 1878, running parallel to the creek for much of its lower course. The Old West Side residential area expanded across the western portions of the creekshed during the late 19th century. More impervious surfaces and industrial uses, alongside sewage pollution from outhouses by the early 20th century, led the stream water quality to greatly decline. In the 1920s, landowners petitioned the city to enclose it within a storm drain system. The main stem of the creek was converted to a pipe network in 1926, with its tributary branches following over the succeeding years. Many masonry arches and bridges which ran over the creek were simply buried underground during the construction.

High rainwater runoff flows continued to damage the now-buried stream channels, leading to increased water velocity as the quantity of impervious surfaces have increased. The watershed experienced major floods in 1947 and 1968, with localized floods in 1998 and 2000. Between 1988 and 2001, all flood insurance claims in Ann Arbor were from within the Allen Creek watershed, and within 0.25 miles (0.40 km) of the floodplain. The Liberty-Glendale pipe was added to the system to contain runoff in 1997. In 2005 and 2006, the Washtenaw County Drain Commissioner office sponsored residents of the creekshed to create rain gardens to capture stormwater runoff.

=== Greenway proposals ===
A proposal for a greenway following Allen Creek's course was first put forth in 1981 with the city's Plans for Parks, Recreation and Open Spaces (PROS). This idea was included within successive PROS plans and the 1988 Ann Arbor Downtown Plan. Proposals to open up some of the stream to the surface continued to circulate, but faced opposition to their expense and required logistics. In 2004, further interest in unearthing the creek emerged among residents opposed to the construction of a nearby parking garage, who argued that the site could instead be converted into a public park. The Ann Arbor Park Advisory Commission voted in 2005 to recommend that three city-owned properties along the creek be converted to "anchor parks", part of a larger future greenway.

Prior to 2013, the Ann Arbor Railroad was owned by the Ann Arbor Acquisition Corporation in Howell, which was uncooperative with Ann Arbor officials' attempts to organize the greenway along the rail corridor. Negotiations expanded after the railroad's purchase by the national transportation company Watco. An alternate proposal avoided the rail corridor and instead took a path through the University of Michigan campus. The city published its master plan for the corridor in 2017, seeking to run it from the Border-to-Border Trail in the north, and roughly along the railway to the intersection of State Street and Stimson Street in the south, a total length of about 2.6 miles (4.2 km). The greenway plans outlined the construction of stormwater management facilities along its path, but did not seek to open up buried sections of the creek, as sufficiently large parcels of land along its course could not be acquired by the city.
