= History of Ann Arbor, Michigan =

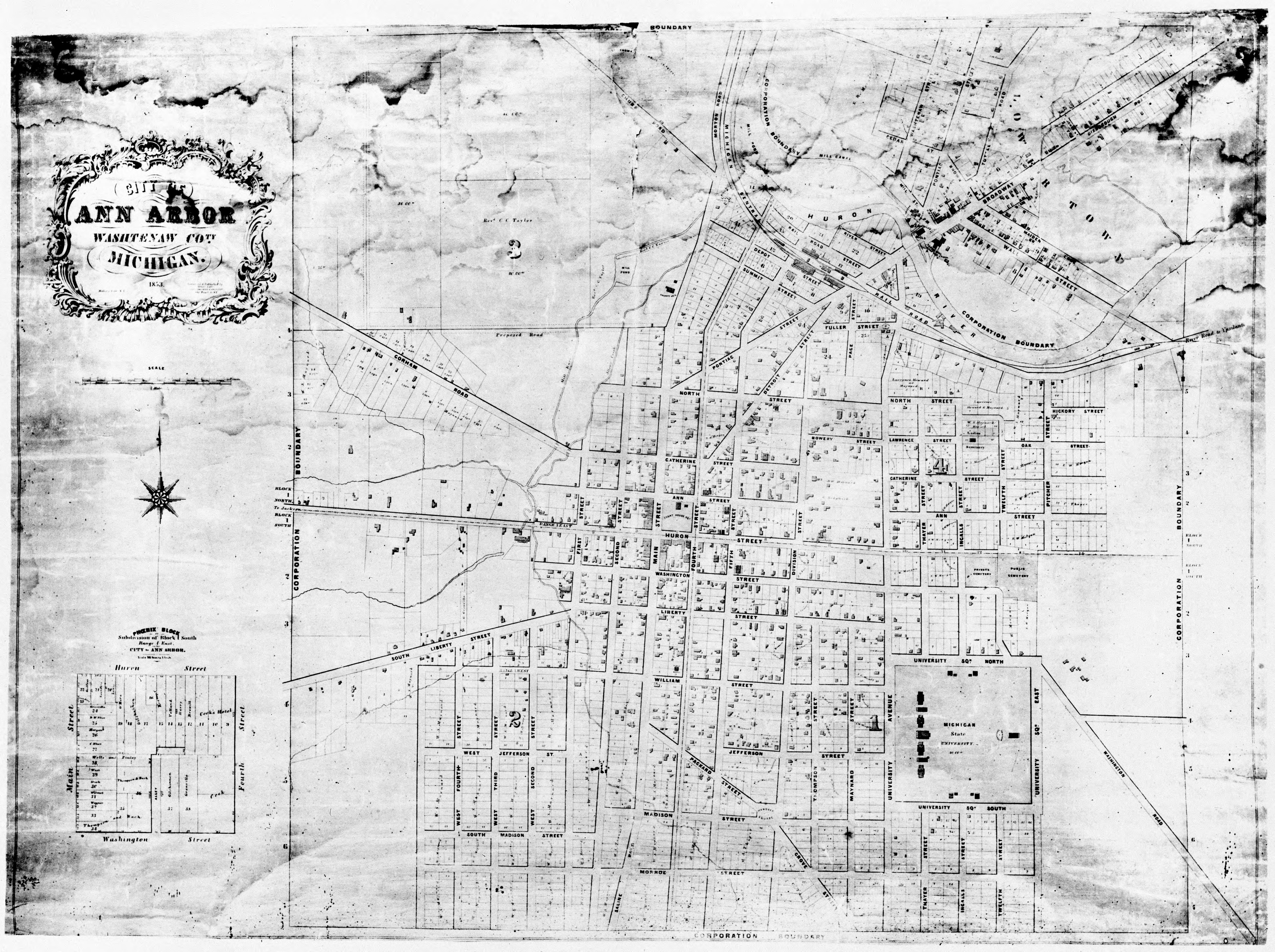
Map of Ann Arbor, 1853

The recorded history of Ann Arbor, Michigan, began with settlers from various eastern states in early 1824.

== Before founding as Ann Arbor ==
The lands of present-day Ann Arbor were part of Massachusetts's western claim after the French and Indian War (1754–1763), bounded by the latitudes of Massachusetts Bay Colony's original charter, to which it was entitled by its interpretation of its original sea-to-sea grant from the British Crown. Massachusetts ceded the claim to the federal government as part of the Northwest Territory after April 19, 1785.

The region was once inhabited by several Native American tribes, the most prominent being the Anishinaabe people of the Three Fires — the Odawa, Ojibwe, and Potawatomi. The Potawatomi founded two villages in the area of what is now Ann Arbor in about 1774. Other tribes that inhabited the area included the Meskwaki, Wyandots, and Sauk. These peoples established several trails that converged on present-day Ann Arbor. The land that included Washtenaw County was ceded to the U.S. by the Odawa, Ojibwe, Potawatomi, and Wyandot in the Treaty of Detroit of 1807.

== Founding ==
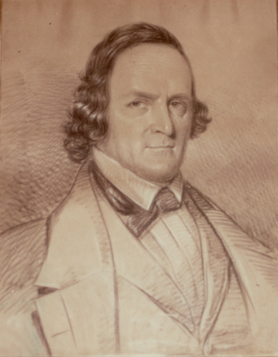
John Allen, undated portrait

The original founders were John Allen from Virginia and Elisha Rumsey from New York. On May 25, 1824, the town plat was registered with Wayne County as "Annarbour"; this represents the earliest known use of the town's name.

Their wives' names were both Ann (in the latter case, either Ann Rumsey or Ana Rumsey, depending on the text consulted). One account states that Allen and Rumsey decided to name the settlement "Annarbour", for their spouses (after discarding the alternative names Allensville and Annapolis) and for the stands of bur oak in the 640 acres (2.6 km^{2}) of land they had purchased for US$800 from the federal government. The Native Americans of the region knew the settlement as Kaw-geesh-kaw-nick (Ojibwe: Gaa-giishka'aanig [syncope: Gaa-giishkhaanig], "saw-milling place"), after the sound of "mill" of Allen's grist mill.

Rumsey died in 1827; Allen eventually became the town's postmaster, newspaper publisher, village president, and all-around promoter.

== The 19th century ==
Several mills, a tannery, and a general store flourished in the settlement. The general store (or tavern, again depending on the source) was painted bright red and the corner on which it was established, at Huron and Main, became known as Bloody Corners. In 1836, Ann Arbor lost a bid to be established as the state capital. However, in 1837 Ann Arbor won a bid to be the new site for the University of Michigan when it offered forty acres (160,000 m^{2}) of land for the site. The Michigan Central Railroad arrived in 1839, making the town a major regional transportation hub.

Ann Arbor became the seat of Washtenaw County in 1827, incorporated as a village in 1833, and was chartered as a city in 1851, which was also the year that John Allen died. The town became home first to large numbers of German immigrants from the state of Württemberg and escapees from the Great Irish Famine (1845-1849), though Canadians accounted for the largest percentage of Ann Arbor's immigrants during most of the 19th century.

== The 20th century and progressivism ==
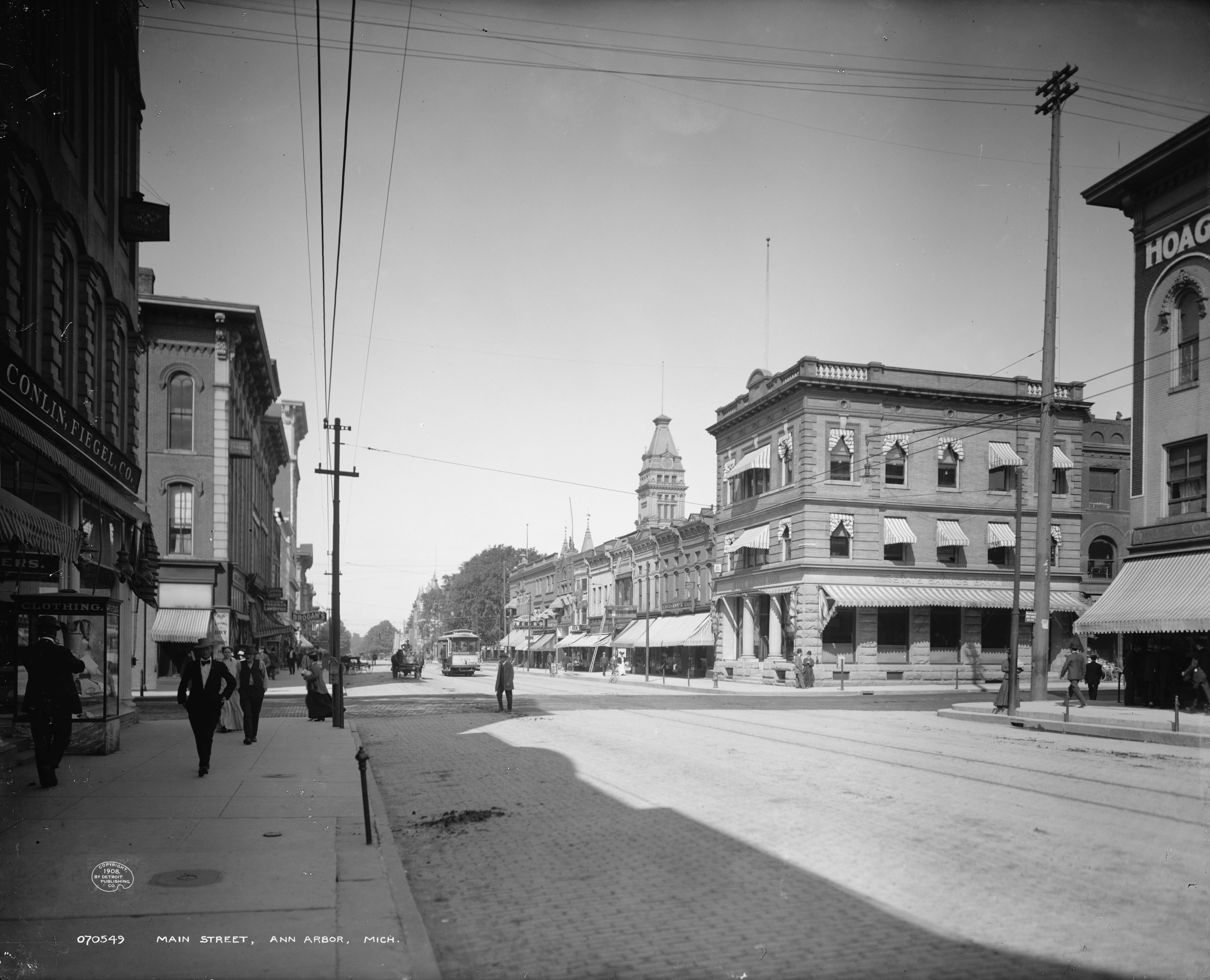
Main Street in Ann Arbor c. 1908

During World War I, Germans became targets of animosity because of their alleged sympathy for the German state, and four professors in the university's German department were dismissed because of what was alleged by the regents to be an "excess" of faculty in the department.

During World War II, Ford Motor Company's nearby Willow Run plant turned out B-24 Liberator bombers and the population of Ann Arbor exploded with an influx of military personnel, war workers, and their families.

East Ann Arbor incorporated as a city from portions of Pittsfield Township in 1947 and was named due to its proximity to Ann Arbor. In 1957, Ann Arbor annexed the city into its boundaries, and East Ann Arbor ceased to exist.

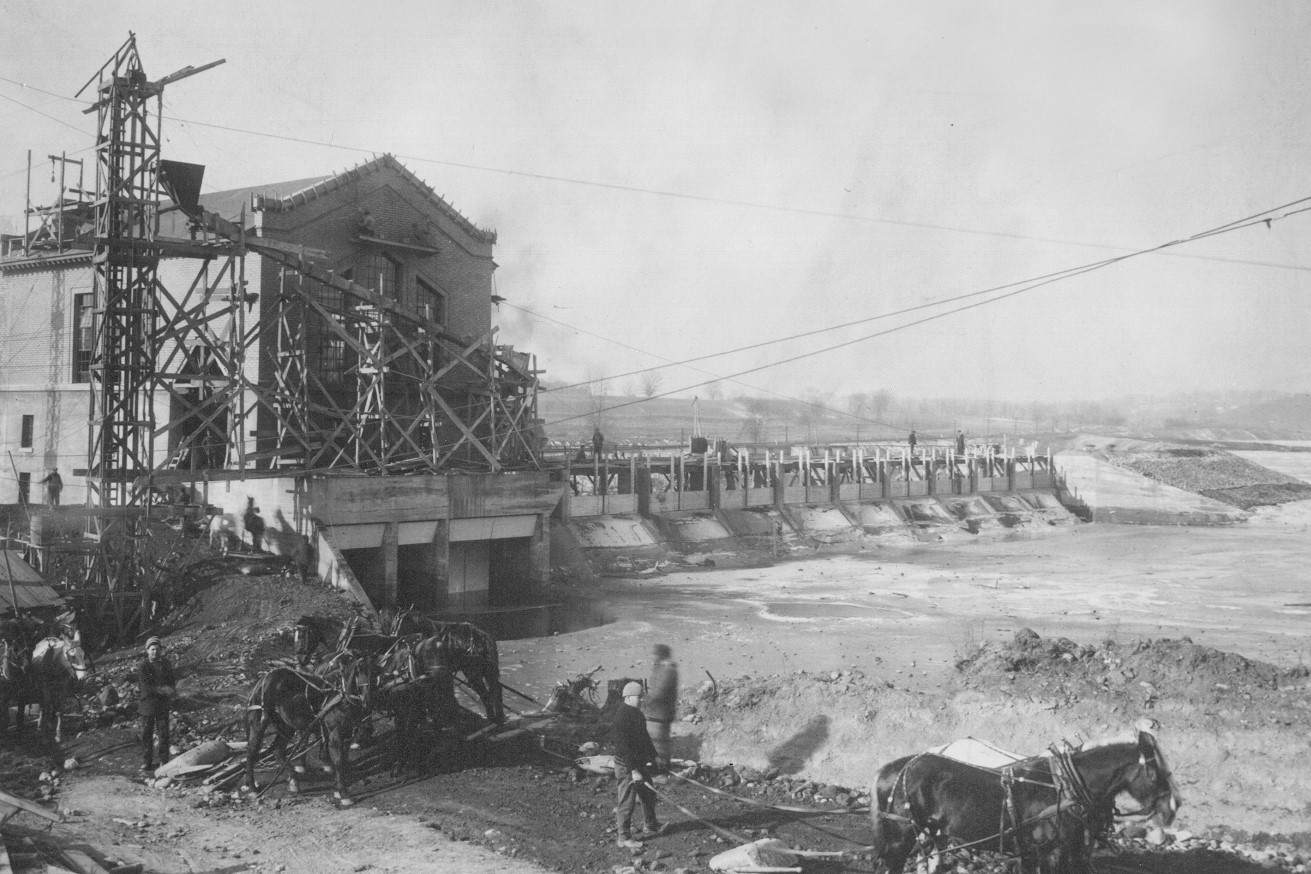
Barton Dam under construction in 1912

In 1960, Ann Arbor was the site of major speeches by both major presidential candidates, John F. Kennedy and Richard Nixon. On October 14, 1960, Kennedy outlined his proposal for what would become the Peace Corps on the front steps of the Michigan Union (a plaque still marks the spot). On May 22, 1964, Lyndon B. Johnson unveiled his Great Society initiative during a University of Michigan commencement address.

During the 1960s, Ann Arbor became a focus for both the American civil rights movement and the anti-Vietnam War movement. It was, for example, the site of the first major meetings of Students for a Democratic Society in 1960. After a number of protests and an extensive public campaign, the city passed its first fair housing ordinance in 1963.

In June 1969, students and protesters took over portions of South University Avenue over the course of three days of protests and rioting. However, the police, drawn from many surrounding communities, and many with their names and badges covered up, took back the streets with the use of tear gas, police dogs, and the threat of firearms. Between 1972 and 1976, the city council went through a period in which three members of the Human Rights Party (HRP) were elected and fought for several measures that at the time seemed radical, including a pioneering anti-discrimination ordinance, an ordinance reducing penalties for possession of marijuana (the famous "five-dollar pot law"), and a rent control ordinance. In 1973, Kathy Kozachenko was elected to the Ann Arbor city council, becoming the nation's first openly gay candidate to run successfully for elected office.

In 1974, a city survey found that a two-thirds majority of residents supported a city income tax. In 1975, Ann Arbor became the first U.S. city to use instant-runoff voting for a mayoral race. Adopted through a ballot initiative sponsored by the local Human Rights Party, which feared a splintering of the liberal vote, the process was repealed in 1976 after use in only one election.

Throughout the 1960s and 1970s, Ann Arbor was home to many influential rock bands, such as the MC5, Alice Cooper, Iggy Pop, Brownsville Station, George Clinton, Bob Seger and the Silver Bullet Band, Mitch Ryder, and The Rationals. Madonna was a dance major at the University of Michigan in the late 1970s. In 1969, avant-garde jazz bandleader Sun Ra and his Arkestra spent about a month living in an Ann Arbor frat house, with poet-impresario John Sinclair and his radical White Panther Party for next-door neighbors.

Four years after leaving the White House, Gerald R. Ford – a former student and college football player at Michigan – opened his Presidential Library in Ann Arbor. His Museum is located in Grand Rapids, Michigan.

The economy of Ann Arbor underwent a gradual shift from a manufacturing base to a service and technology base over the course of the 20th century, a shift which accelerated in the 1970s and 1980s. As of 1999, Ann Arbor was home to 25 research centers and libraries.

During the same period, land values have increased and the city has gentrified. Some long-time residents have been driven out by high prices.

Conservative groups and movements have also started within the city. The Word of God, a charismatic Christian movement of global scope, started in 1967. Ann Arbor also became the site of the Thomas More Law Center, a leading religious-conservative advocacy group founded in 1999.

== The 21st century ==
On November 2, 2004, a proposition to legalize medical marijuana was passed by a margin of 74% to 26%. Though the city attorney and police chief subsequently declared the law unenforceable, possession of marijuana for personal use has been essentially decriminalized in Ann Arbor for three decades, punishable only by a $25 civil-infraction fine and no criminal record. However, the much harsher state law applies to possession on university property (see Cannabis laws in Ann Arbor).

The same day, voters approved a greenbelt plan: the city government would acquire development rights to agricultural land bordering Ann Arbor to prevent sprawling development. Since then, local debate has hinged on whether (and how) to accommodate development within city limits. The Greenbelt has, at times, been controversial because if other planned measures (like increasing the city's density) stall, already high property values could rise further, pushing low and middle income residents to new exurbs beyond the greenbelt.

In 2018, two council members sued the city over a council decision to sell a city-owned property downtown to a housing developer. Later that year, the city narrowly passed a proposal to keep that space as city owned property in perpetuity. In 2020, the city council enacted a resolution sponsored by then council members Anne Bannister and Jeff Hayner to form an advisory body for developing the roof of the parking structure into a city park. By late 2022, this advisory board had sent council a request to direct staff to evaluate the site for use for food truck rallies and other events. In April 2023, city staff responded to this request with a memorandum stating in part that "this site is not well-suited for use as a food truck rally or food truck installation and that it will require significant capital investment to bring the site up to a standard that would be safe, convenient, and attractive as a community event space." The following city council meeting included public comments deriding the lack of progress from this advisory commission.

In 2020, after the city council voted 7–4 to fire city administrator Howard Lazarus, several of the council members who voted to fire him lost their elections. In April 2021, the city council voted to strip Jeff Hayner of his committee assignments response to his use of homophobic and racist slurs, followed in June by a vote to ask him to resign. Hayner's ally on council, Elizabeth Nelson, defended Hayner, saying he "spoke the phonetic sounds without euphemism." Hayner did not run for re-election in 2022 and Nelson lost her primary to Dharma Akmon in a series of elections that gave the mayor's faction 11-0 control of city council. In 2020, partly as a response to the COVID-19 pandemic, the city government opened several downtown streets to pedestrians, limiting their use by motor vehicles to emergency vehicles during summertime weekends. In addition to providing a large pedestrian mall, these changes allow restaurants to use more of the sidewalks and part of the street for outdoor seating. These changes were popular enough that in 2021 the city council extended the dates from March to November, continuing the schedule of cordoning off cars from Thursday evening until Monday morning.

In September 2020, Ann Arbor had decriminalized the non-psychoactive drug called psilocybin.

In 2021 the city council launched a social district downtown, allowing visitors to carry alcoholic beverages between different businesses in the district.

Anti-abortion protesters were outnumbered ten-to-one by abortion-rights counterprotesters in 2017. In 2019, The Diag hosted a Stop the Bans rally. In 2022 in the shadow of the Dobbs decision, the diag once again became a rallying point for abortion rights protests, drawing thousands of protesters, including US Rep. Debbie Dingell, Senator Debbie Stabenow, and Michigan Lt. Gov. Garlin Gilchrist.

The Ann Arbor city Council passed a resolution calling for a "bilateral ceasefire" in Israel's war on Gaza on January 11, 2024, after almost 90 community members spoke in favor of the resolution.

== Timeline ==
- 25 May 1824: Annarbour, Wayne County, Michigan Territory.
- 1827–1832: Annarbour, Township of Ann Arbour, Wayne County, Michigan Territory.
- 1833 – 26 January 1837: Village of Ann Arbour, Township of Ann Arbour, Washtenaw County, Michigan Territory.
- October 1835: Village of Ann Arbor, Ann Arbor Township, Washtenaw County, 'de facto' State of Michigan.
- 14 December 1836: Following the Toledo War, the Frostbitten Convention in Ann Arbor concedes the Toledo Strip and accepts the western three-fourths of the Upper Peninsula, allowing the State of Michigan to become a U.S. state.
- 26 January 1837: U.S. Congress recognizes the State of Michigan and dissolves the Territory of Michigan. Village of Ann Arbor, Ann Arbor Township, Washtenaw County, State of Michigan, United States of America.
- 1837: University of Michigan received land.
