= Henry Rumsey =

American politician

Member of the Michigan Senate from the 4th district
- In office November 2, 1835 – December 31, 1837

Personal details
- Born: July 7, 1784 Sharon, Connecticut
- Died: April 8, 1855 (aged 70) Ann Arbor, Michigan
- Party: Democratic

Henry Rumsey (July 7, 1784 – April 8, 1855) was an American judge and politician in the U.S. state of Michigan. He was a member of the Michigan Senate in its first term, and a portion of his farm became the campus of the University of Michigan.

== Biography ==
Rumsey was born in Sharon, Litchfield County, Connecticut, on July 7, 1784, the son of Revolutionary War veteran William Rumsey and Elizabeth Walker. The Rumseys moved to Hubbardton, Vermont in 1787 or 1788. About 1808, Henry Rumsey moved to land he had purchased from the Holland Land Company in Genesee County, New York, and his younger brother Elisha Walker Rumsey moved to the county as well by 1818.

Elisha Walker Rumsey traveled west and co-founded the city of Ann Arbor, Michigan, in 1824, and Henry followed his brother to Ann Arbor shortly thereafter. In 1825, Henry purchased 80 acres (32 ha) of land from James Noyes for $300 (equivalent to $8,537 in 2025). Following Elisha's death in 1827, Henry, as the executor of his estate, was ordered to pay up to $800 for the building of a town jail that Elisha had promised; it was completed in 1828 but burned down a few years later.

In January 1830, Rumsey was part of a group of eight men who set out west from Ann Arbor to mark a new road along with the commission that was surveying it. They went as far as a cabin near the Grand River, where Rumsey was elected president of an informal "convention" to decide on a name for the place. They chose the name Jacksonburgh, which was later shortened to Jackson, Michigan.

=== Political career ===
Rumsey served as the first supervisor of Ann Arbor Township in 1827 and again in 1834, and was elected as a representative to the first Michigan Territorial Council, from 1827 to 1829. He was elected to the Michigan Senate in 1835, for its first term under the new state constitution, and served until 1837. He was a member of the Democratic Party.

On June 5, 1837, the Regents of the University of Michigan traveled from Detroit, where most of them lived, to Ann Arbor for a three-day meeting. A land company had been established in Ann Arbor for the purpose of donating 40 acres (16 ha) of land on which to establish the University of Michigan, an arrangement which had allowed Ann Arbor to triumph over several other communities in the selection of a site. During this session, the regents chose 40 acres of Rumsey's farm as their preferred location, and soon built a single university building and four professors' residences.

He died in Ann Arbor on April 8, 1855, and is buried in Forest Hill Cemetery.

=== Family ===
Rumsey married Durinda D. Foster on February 12, 1812, and they had four children: Minerva E., Melville L., Volney, and Julius Caesar Rumsey. Durinda died on July 4, 1852, in Ann Arbor.
