= Joseph Kemp =

Joseph Kemp may refer to:

- Joseph Kemp (organist) (1778–1824), English composer and organist
- Joseph Kemp (Medal of Honor) (1844–1917), American soldier and Medal of Honor recipient
- Joseph Kemp (minister) (1872–1933), New Zealand Baptist minister
- Sir Joseph Horsford Kemp (1874–1950), British lawyer and Chief Justice of Hong Kong
