= Forest Hill Cemetery (Ann Arbor, Michigan) =

Cemetery in Ann Arbor, Washtenaw County, Michigan

Coordinates: 42°16′39.9″N 83°43′49.8″W

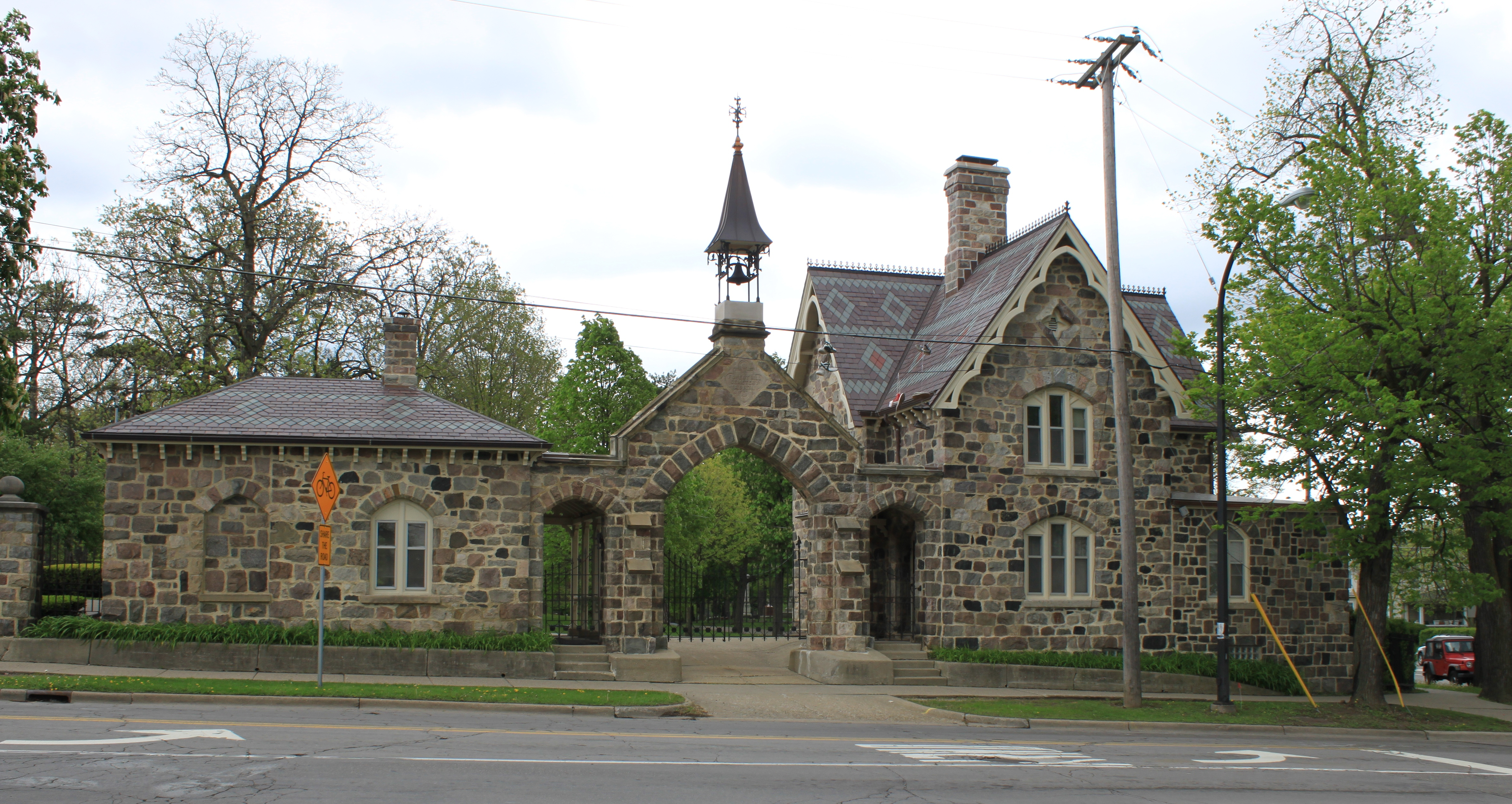
- Forest Hill Cemetery entrance
- Interactive map of Forest Hill Cemetery

Details
- Established: 1857; 169 years ago
- Location: Ann Arbor, Michigan, U.S.
- Size: 65 acres (26 ha)
- Website: foresthillcemeteryaa.org
- Find a Grave: Forest Hill Cemetery

Forest Hill Cemetery is a 65-acre (260,000 m^{2}) cemetery at 415 Observatory Street in Ann Arbor, Michigan. It was designed by James Lewis Glenn and opened in 1857.

== History ==
Prior to its use as a cemetery, the site was the location of the nation's first fraternity building, a hunting lodge, built by the Chi Psi fraternity in 1849.

Civil engineer James Lewis Glenn designed the cemetery in the rural or garden style popular in the second half of the 19th century. The cemetery's main gate was designed by James Morwick in the Gothic Revival style. Gordon W. Lloyd, a leading architect based in Detroit, Michigan, designed the cemetery's gatehouse and sexton's residence, also in the Gothic Revival style.

In 1859 Dr. Benajah Ticknor was the first person to be buried in Forest Hill. Ticknor had been a surgeon in the U.S. Navy and the owner of property now known as Cobblestone Farm in Ann Arbor.

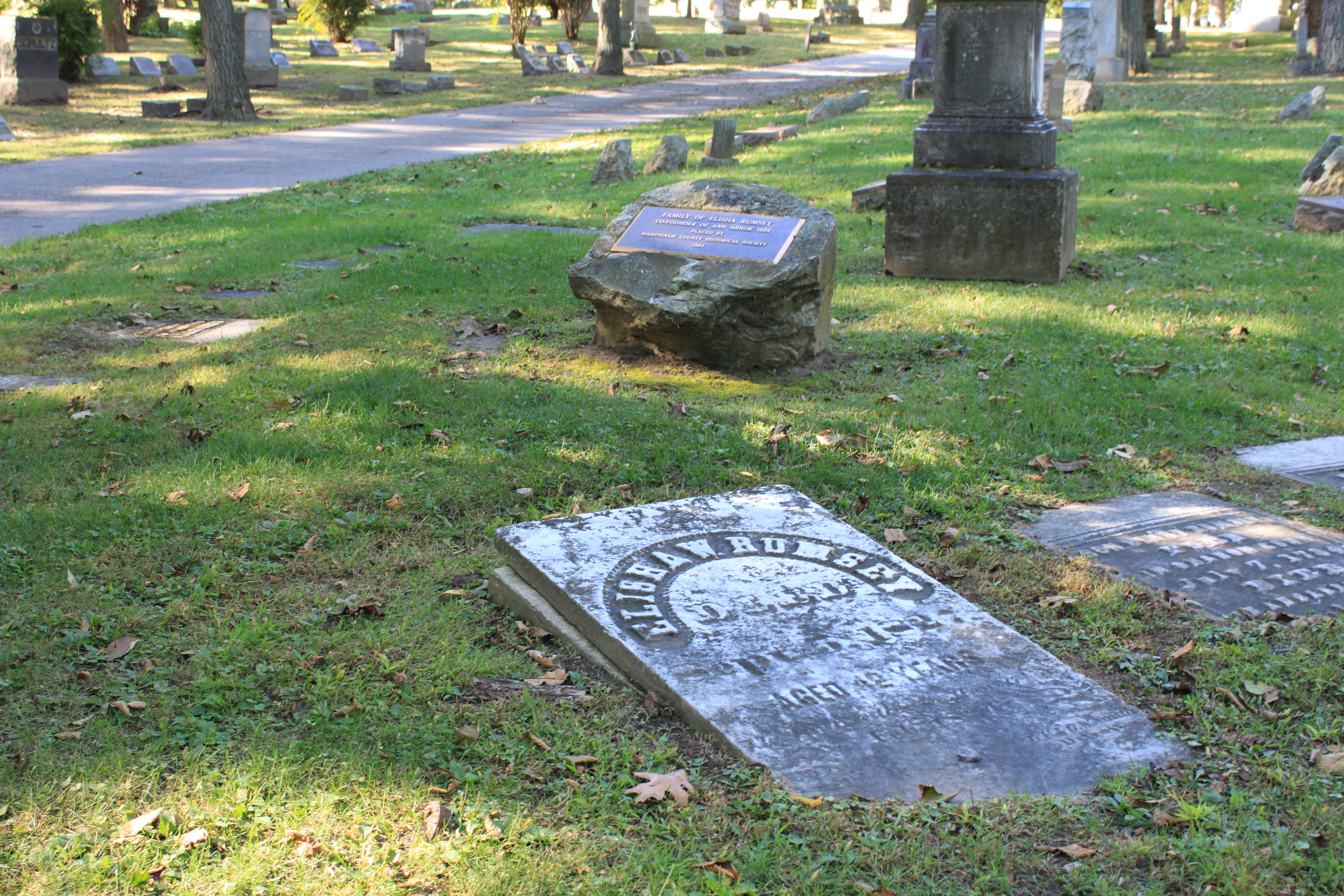
Grave of Elisha Walker Rumsey, co-founder of Ann Arbor

== Notable persons interred at Forest Hill ==
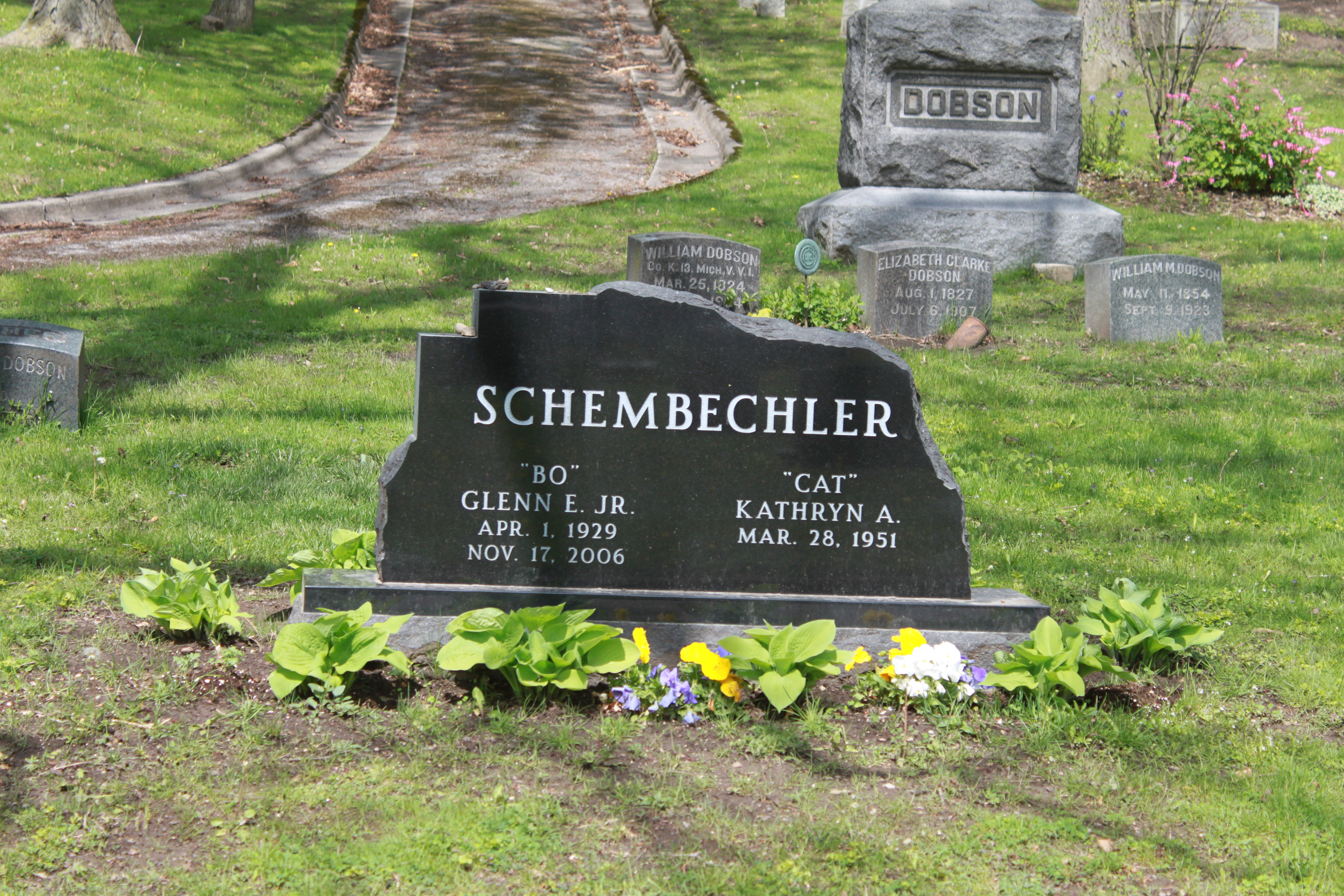
Grave of Bo Schembechler

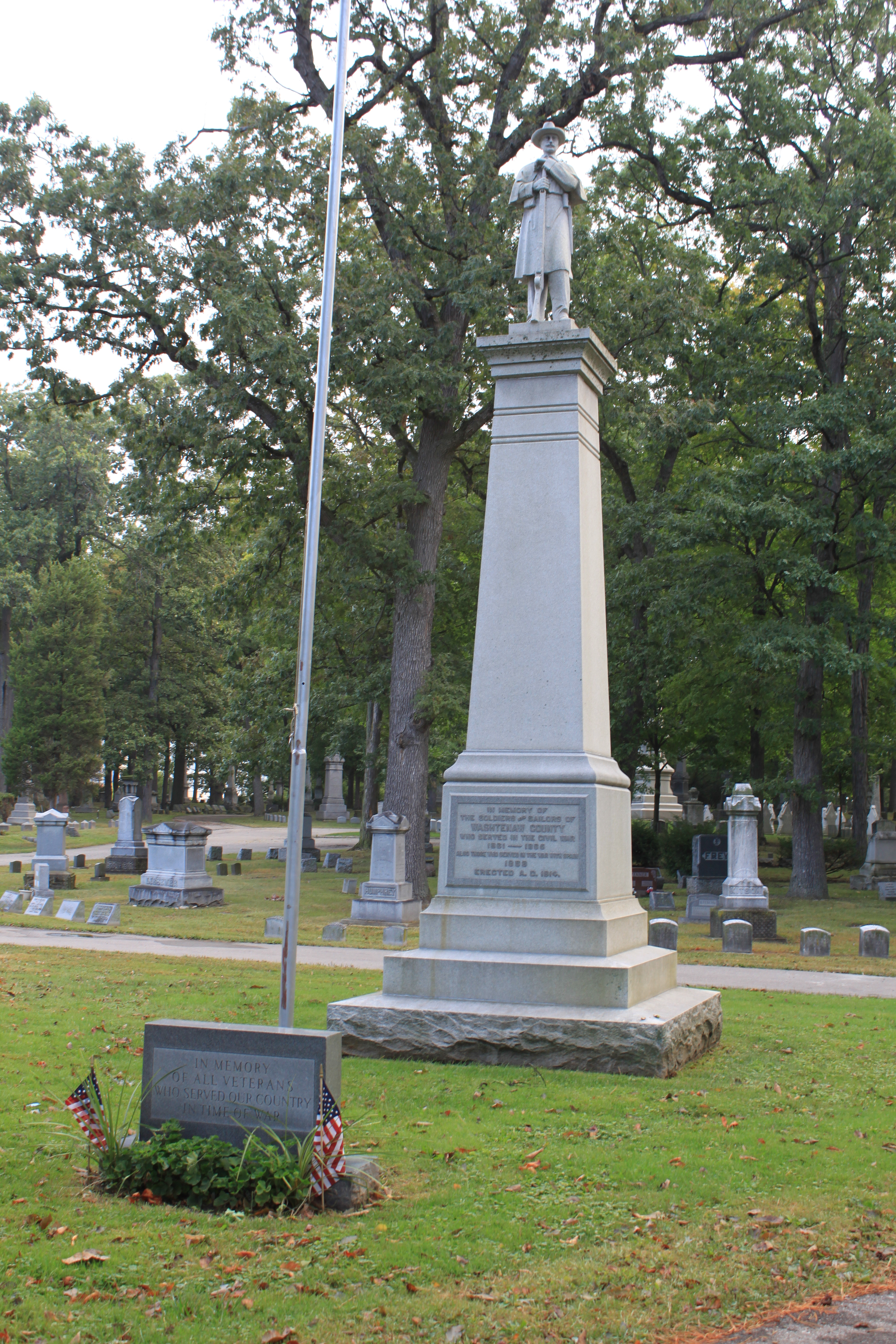
Soldiers and Sailors memorial, 1914

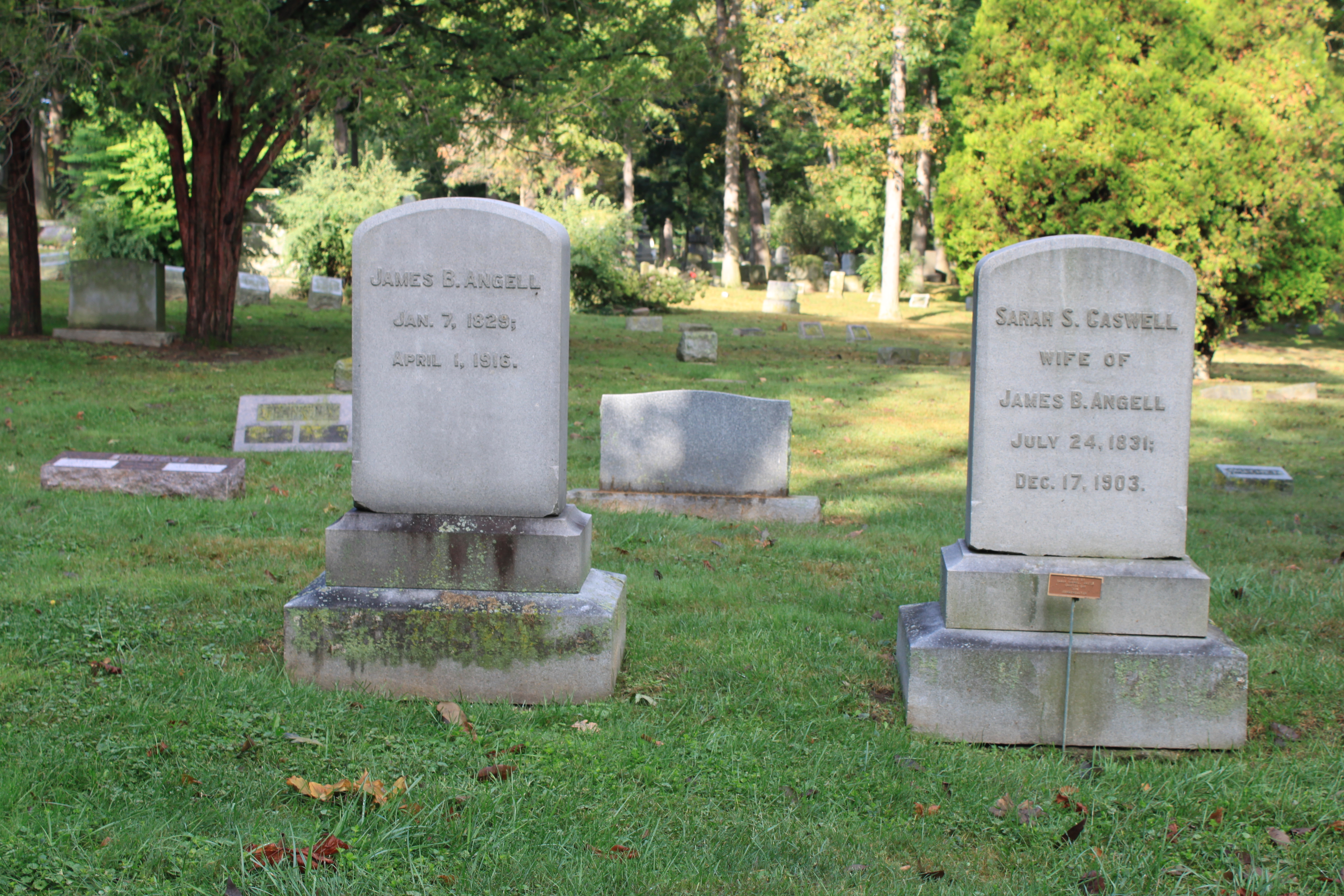
Grave of James Burrill Angell

- John Allen, American pioneer and co-founder of Ann Arbor
- James Burrill Angell, longest-serving president of the University of Michigan
- Scott Asheton, musician
- Albert Moore Barrett, American physician and professor of psychiatry at the University of Michigan
- Clara Doty Bates, author
- Samuel Willard Beakes, Mayor of Ann Arbor and U.S. Congressman
- William Warner Bishop, librarian
- William E. Brown Jr.
- Marion LeRoy Burton, President of the University of Michigan
- William L. Clements
- Charles Horton Cooley, sociologist
- Thomas McIntyre Cooley, professor of law, justice of the Michigan Supreme Court, president of the Interstate Commerce Commission
- Cecil O. Creal, Mayor of Ann Arbor
- Lloyd Cassel Douglas, author
- Pete Elliott, football coach
- Elizabeth Farrand, author and librarian
- Alpheus Felch, Michigan Governor and U.S. Senator
- William A. Fletcher, first chief justice of the state of Michigan
- Thomas Francis Jr., medical pioneer
- William Frankena, philosopher
- Henry Simmons Frieze, president of the University of Michigan
- Bradley F. Granger, U.S. Congressman
- Harry Burns Hutchins, president of the University of Michigan
- Eleonore Hutzel, nurse and social worker
- Eva A. Jessye, composer and choir director
- George Jewett, first African-American football player at both the University of Michigan and Northwestern University
- Yale Kamisar, professor of Law, known as "father of Miranda" for his contribution to the creation of the Miranda warning
- Joseph Kemp, Civil War soldier and Medal of Honor recipient
- Oscar John Larson, U.S. Representative
- Emmett Norman Leith, professor of electrical engineering
- Rensis Likert, American statistician
- Don Lund, baseball player
- Rusty Magee, American composer and lyricist for theater, film, and television
- Charles H. Manly, Michigan politician
- Vincent Massey, Australian enzymologist and University of Michigan faculty
- William S. Maynard, Mayor of Ann Arbor
- George Meader (1907–1994), U.S. Representative from Michigan
- Ann Mikolowski, artist, co-founder of The Alternative Press
- Conrad Noll, Civil War soldier and Medal of Honor recipient
- Frederick George Novy, American bacteriologist, organic chemist, and instructor
- Albert Benjamin Prescott, professor of chemistry and founder of the University of Michigan College of Pharmacy
- Hereward Thimbleby Price, British writer
- Eugene B. Power, founder of University Microfilms and regent of the University of Michigan
- Elisha Walker Rumsey, co-founder of Ann Arbor
- Henry Rumsey, American judge and politician
- Israel Russell, American geologist and geographer
- Alexander Grant Ruthven, president of the University of Michigan
- Bo Schembechler, head football coach and athletic director at the University of Michigan
- Joseph Beal Steere, American ornithologist
- William C. Stevens, Michigan politician
- Louise Reed Stowell, scientist, microscopist, author, editor
- Henry Franklin Thomas
- Bob Ufer, University of Michigan track star, sports broadcaster
- James Craig Watson, astronomer
- Norval E. Welch, American Civil War Union Army Officer
- Leslie White, anthropologist
- Fielding H. Yost, head football coach and athletic director at the University of Michigan
