= Cecil Creal =

American politician (1899–1986)

Mayor of Ann Arbor
- In office April 10, 1959 – 1965
- Preceded by: Samuel J. Eldersveld
- Succeeded by: Wendell Hulcher

Personal details
- Born: December 19, 1899; Kiantone, New York, U.S.
- Died: November 20, 1986 (aged 86); Ann Arbor, Michigan, U.S.
- Resting place: Forest Hill Cemetery
- Political party: Republican
- Spouse: Dama Godfrey (m. 1925)
- Children: 2

Military service
- Branch/service: United States Navy
- Battles/wars: World War I

Cecil Osborn Creal (December 19, 1899 – November 20, 1986) was mayor of Ann Arbor, in the U.S. state of Michigan, from 1959 to 1965.

== Life and career ==
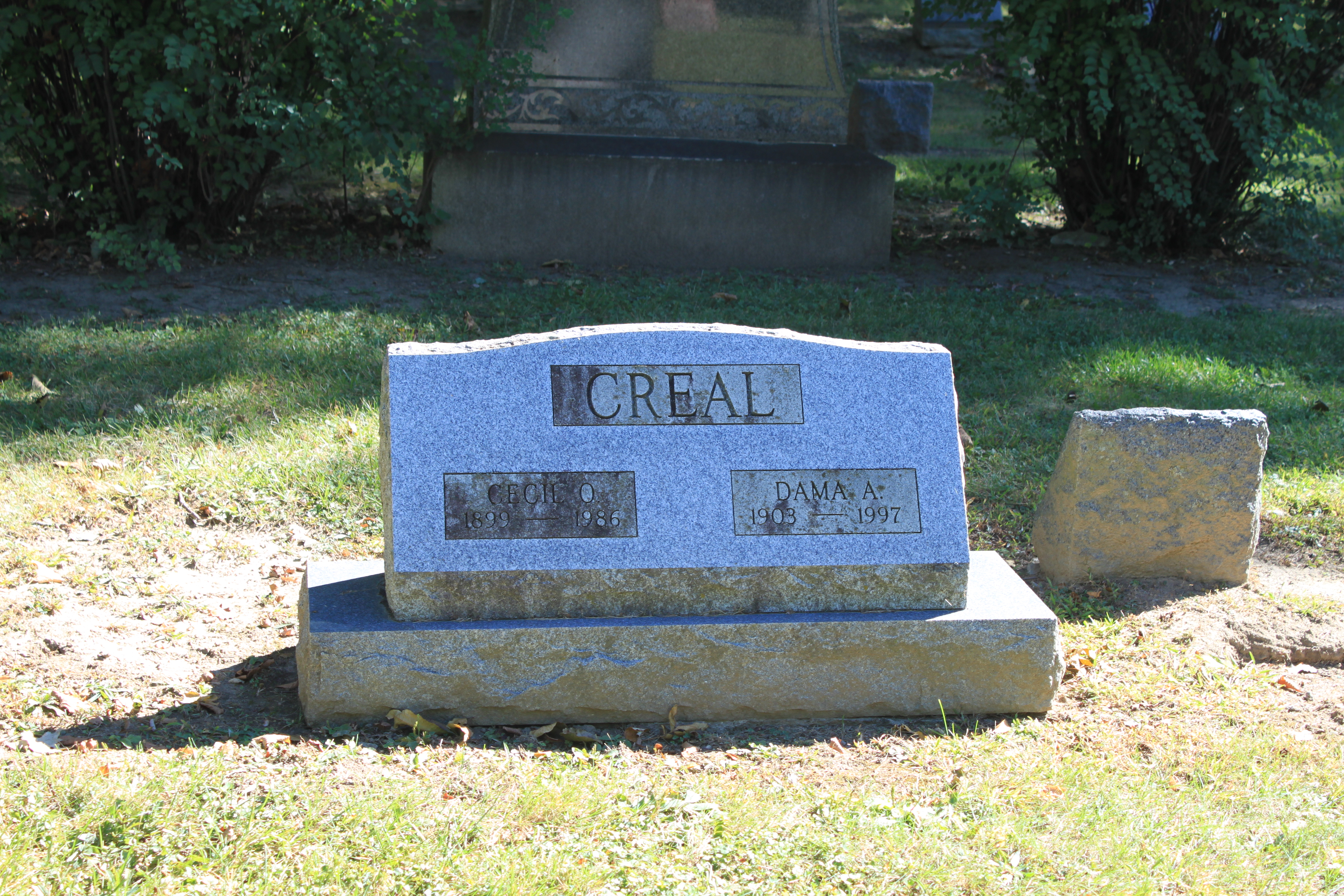
Creal's grave

Creal was born in 1899 in Kiantone, Chautauqua County, New York. During World War I, he served in the U.S. Navy. Creal married Dama Godfrey of Ann Arbor in 1925. He was an Episcopalian. Creal had two sons, Richard and Robert.

Under Ann Arbor's old system of municipal governance, Creal served as President of the Ann Arbor Common Council (City Council) for multiple terms. The council president presided at the meetings then. The mayor under that system was more of a ceremonial figurehead, who had power of veto over council decisions, but did not attend the meetings.

Creal ran for Ann Arbor mayor as a Republican in 1959. He defeated Democrat Lloyd M. Ives, and was sworn in on April 10, 1959. Creal went on to win two more terms, triumphing over Democrats Dorothee S. Pealy in 1961 and Albert F. Schneider in 1963. Creal did not run for a fourth term in 1965.

Creal died in Ann Arbor on November 20, 1986, and is buried at Forest Hill Cemetery. Ann Arbor's Creal Park and Creal Crescent are both named after Mayor Creal.

== Sources ==
- Mayors of Ann Arbor page at PoliticalGraveyard.com
- Arborweb "Weddings of Yore"
- Cecil Creal on LocalWiki

Preceded by Samuel J. Eldersveld	Mayor of Ann Arbor, Michigan; 1959–1965	Succeeded by Wendell E. Hulcher
