= Clara Doty Bates =

American author (1838–1895)

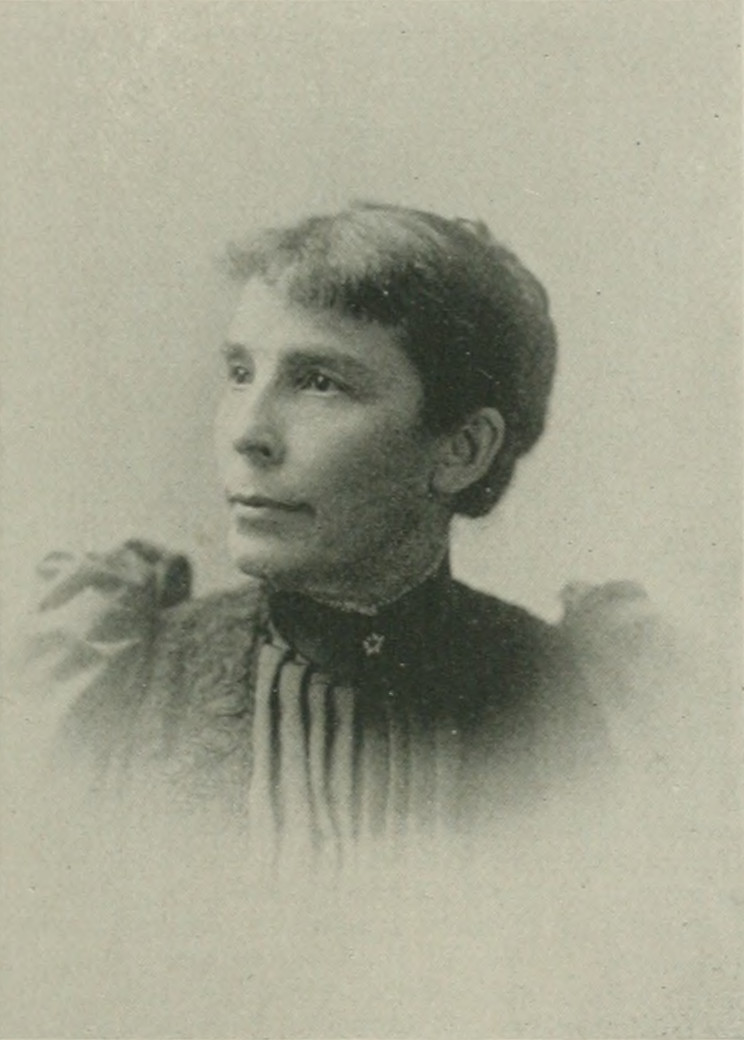
- Photo in A Woman of the Century
- Born: Clara Doty; December 22, 1838; Ann Arbor, Michigan, U.S.
- Died: October 14, 1895 (aged 56); Chicago, Illinois, U.S.
- Resting place: Forest Hill Cemetery, Ann Arbor, Michigan, U.S.
- Occupation: author
- Spouse: Morgan Bates (m. 1869)
- Writing career
- Language: English
- Genres: poetry, juvenile literature
- Notable work: Aesop's Fables in Verse

Clara Doty Bates (née, Doty; December 22, 1838 – October 14, 1895) was a 19th-century American author who published a number of volumes of poetry and juvenile literature. Many of these works were illustrated, the designs being furnished by her sister. Her work was published in St. Nicholas, The Youth's Companion, Golden Days for Boys and Girls, Wide Awake, Godey's Lady's Book, and Peterson's Magazine. During the World's Columbian Exposition, she had charge of the Children's Building.

== Early life and education ==
Clara Doty was born in Ann Arbor, Michigan, December 22, 1838. She was the second daughter of Samuel Rosecrans Doty and Hannah Lawrence, who were among the pioneers of Michigan. Bates was of Dutch and English ancestry. Her great-grandfather, a Rosecrans, was ninety years old when he died, and the legend goes that at the time of his death "his hair was as black as a raven's wing." Another ancestor was with George Washington at Valley Forge. She was also a descendant of Ethan Allen. On the mother's side were the Lawrences, and Hannah Lawrence, the great-grandmother, was remembered for her gift of story-telling. Her siblings included a brother, Duane, and a sister, Helen Ann.

The homestead in Ann Arbor, "Heart's Content," was well known for its books and pictures. Bates had a rhyming talent from her earliest days. She wrote verses when she could only print in big letters. Her first poem was published when she was nine years old.

The location of the State University in Ann Arbor gave better facilities for education than were offered in the usual western village. It was before the admission of women to equal opportunities with men, but it was possible to secure private instruction in advanced studies. This the Doty daughters had in addition to private schools, while the son attended the university.

== Career ==
The majority of Bates's published work was fugitive, although she wrote several books, chiefly for children. Among these were Æsop's Tables Versified, Child Lore, Classics of Babyland, Heart's Content, and several minor books, all published in Boston. Her work was not wholly confined to writing for children: occasionally she contributed to periodicals. But it was as a writer of stories and sketches to please children that Bates was best known. She was a frequent contributor to St. Nicholas, The Youth's Companion, and Golden Days, and a regular contributor to Wide Awake. Her literary ability was first recognized by Charles G. Leland while he was editor of Graham's Magazine. Her efforts frequently appeared in the pages of Godey's Lady's Book and Peterson's Magazine. The first book published by Bates was a work for children, Blind Jakey. It was a Sunday school book and had a wide sale. Aesop's Fables in Verse was her most successful work. Heart's Content, another of her books, was so called in honor of her childhood home in Ann Arbor, the name of which was "Heart's Content". Her last published volume was a collection of verse, From Heart's Content.

Two years previous to the opening of the World's Columbian Exposition, Bates worked to gather together a model children's library and succeeded in doing far more than she expected. She installed the library herself, and at her solicitation nearly every publishing house in the world contributed to it.

== Personal life ==
On September 2, 1869, she married Morgan Bates, a newspaper man and the author of several plays. They made their home in Chicago, Illinois. They had no children. She was a member of the Fortnightly literary club, and served on the literary committee of the Woman's Branch of the World's Congress Auxiliary. Her manuscripts and notes were destroyed by the burning of her father's house. Among them were a finished story, a half-completed novel and some other work.

After suffering severe physical pain for five years, Bates died on October 14, 1895, at the Newberry apartments in Chicago. She was buried at Forest Hill Cemetery, in Ann Arbor.

== Style and themes ==
Prior to 1860, Graham's Magazine was considered one of the best literary magazines of the United States, and one of its most valued contributors was Bates, then Miss Clara Doty. The following comments and quotations are from that magazine in 1858:—

"There is no young writer of poetry at present before our public whose lyrics are more decidedly characteristic than those of Miss Clara Doty, of Ann Arbor, Michigan. If the reader will imagine a clear, yet sensitive mind, which has perfectly appreciated the purest and most sparkling flashes of German poetry, in the deepest and sweetest lyrics of Heine, and which has then, forgetting all models, studied nature, retaining no more of art than is found in our Indian legends, he will have an accurate idea of the impression which her songs convey. There are many sweet little poems of the present day which look like Clara Doty's, but hers have the peculiarity that they are based on a deep, generally a semi-mythologic, thought. They are never rococo.

== Selected works ==
- Classics of Baby-Land. Versified by Mrs. C.D. Bates, etc., 1876
- Camping out, 1877
- Songs for Gold Locks, 1877
- Puss in Boots, 1877
- Baby classics, 1877-83 (with Charlotte Doty Finley)
- Cinderella, 1877 (with Charlotte Doty Finley)
- More classics of babyland, 1878
- Classics of baby-land, 1878 (with Frank T Merrill; Jessie Curtis Shepherd; Charlotte Doty Finley)
- Nursery jingles, 1879
- Heart's content, and they who lived there, 1880
- Rhymes and chimes for little folks, 1880
- Animal antics, 188?
- Old time jingles : including the rhymes of Mother Goose, 1881
- Goody two-shoes and other famous nursery tales., 1883
- Dick Whittington and his cat, 1883
- Ted, Goldlocks, and others, 1883
- Little Red Riding-Hood, 1883
- Silver Locks and the bears, 1883
- Doll Rosy's days, 1884
- Grandpa's guests : childhood poems, 1884
- The Bed-Time Story, 1884
- On the way to Wonderland, 1885
- Little Bo-Peep; Wee Willie Winkie; Sleeping princess, 1885
- Cinderella; Jack and Jill; Banbury cross, 1885
- Selections from Aesop's fables, 189?
- Child lore : its classics, traditions and jingles, 1893
- The three little pigs
- Queerie queers with hands, wings, and claws
- On the Tree Top
- The frogs who wished a king
- Children's ballads from history and folklore
