= Louise Reed Stowell =

American scientist, author, editor

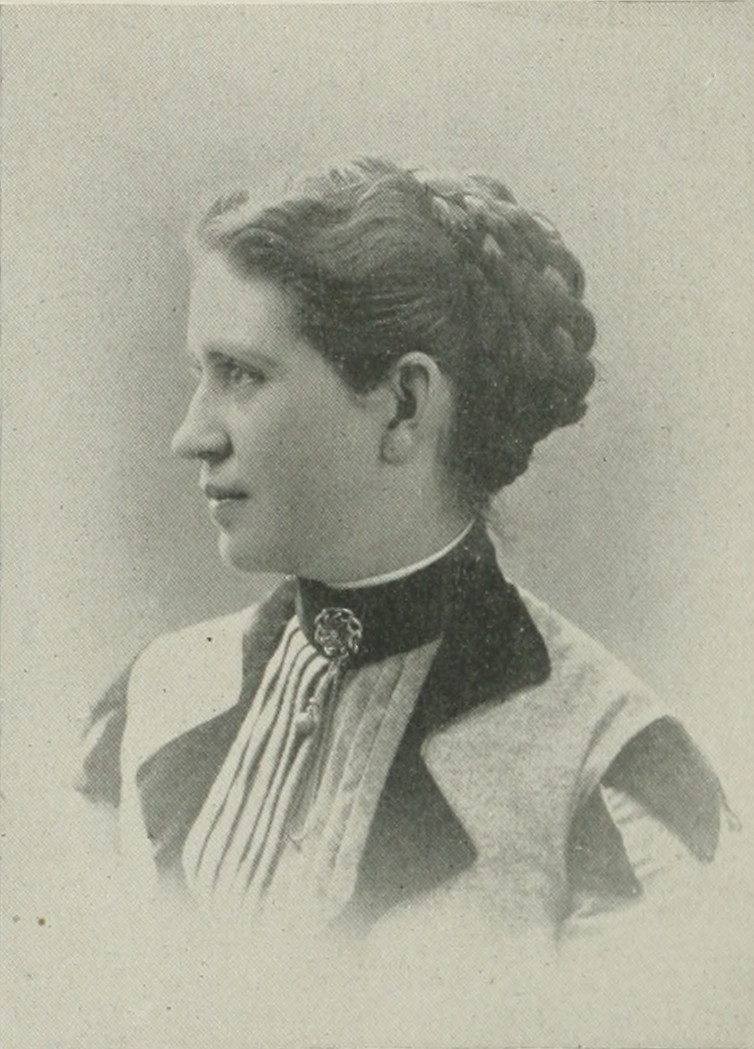
- Portrait from A Woman of the Century, c. 1893
- Born: Louise Maria Reed; December 23, 1850; Grand Blanc, Michigan, U.S.
- Died: February 22, 1932 (aged 81); Tucson, Arizona, U.S.
- Resting place: Forest Hill Cemetery, Ann Arbor, Michigan, U.S.
- Education: University of Michigan
- Occupations: scientist; microscopist; author; editor
- Spouse: Charles Henry Stowell (m. 1878; died 1928)
- Writing career
- Language: English

Louise Reed Stowell (née , Reed; December 23, 1850 – February 2, 1932) (Note: The headstone Louise Reed Stowell shares with her husband gives her year of birth as 1848 and year of death as 1931.) was an American scientist, microscopist, author, and editor. She was the University of Michigan's first woman teacher (1877–89), and the first woman appointed on District of Columbia Public Schools (appointed by President Grover Cleveland). She also served on the Board for the Girls' Reform School for District of Columbia. Stowell died in 1932.

Stowell was engaged as writer and editor in scientific work, contributing over 100 scientific papers to leading magazines and periodicals. She was the author of Microscopical structure of wheat (1879), and Microscopical diagnosis (1882; with C. H. Stowell), as well as the co-founder and editor of The Microscope, An illustrated monthly.

== Early life and education ==
Louise Maria Reed (sometimes Louisa or Lou) was born in Grand Blanc, Michigan, December 23, 1850. She was the daughter of Seth (or Asa) (Note: According to the 1932 University of Michigan obituary, her father was Rev. Asa Reed, a Methodist clergyman and a trustee of Albion College.) Reed, D.D., a Methodist minister and for 68 years, a member of the Detroit Conference United Methodist in Michigan. Her mother was the scholar, Harriet Newall (Russell) Reed (d. 1898). All of her siblings, E. Roscoe, Wilbur F., and H. Ella, reached adulthood.

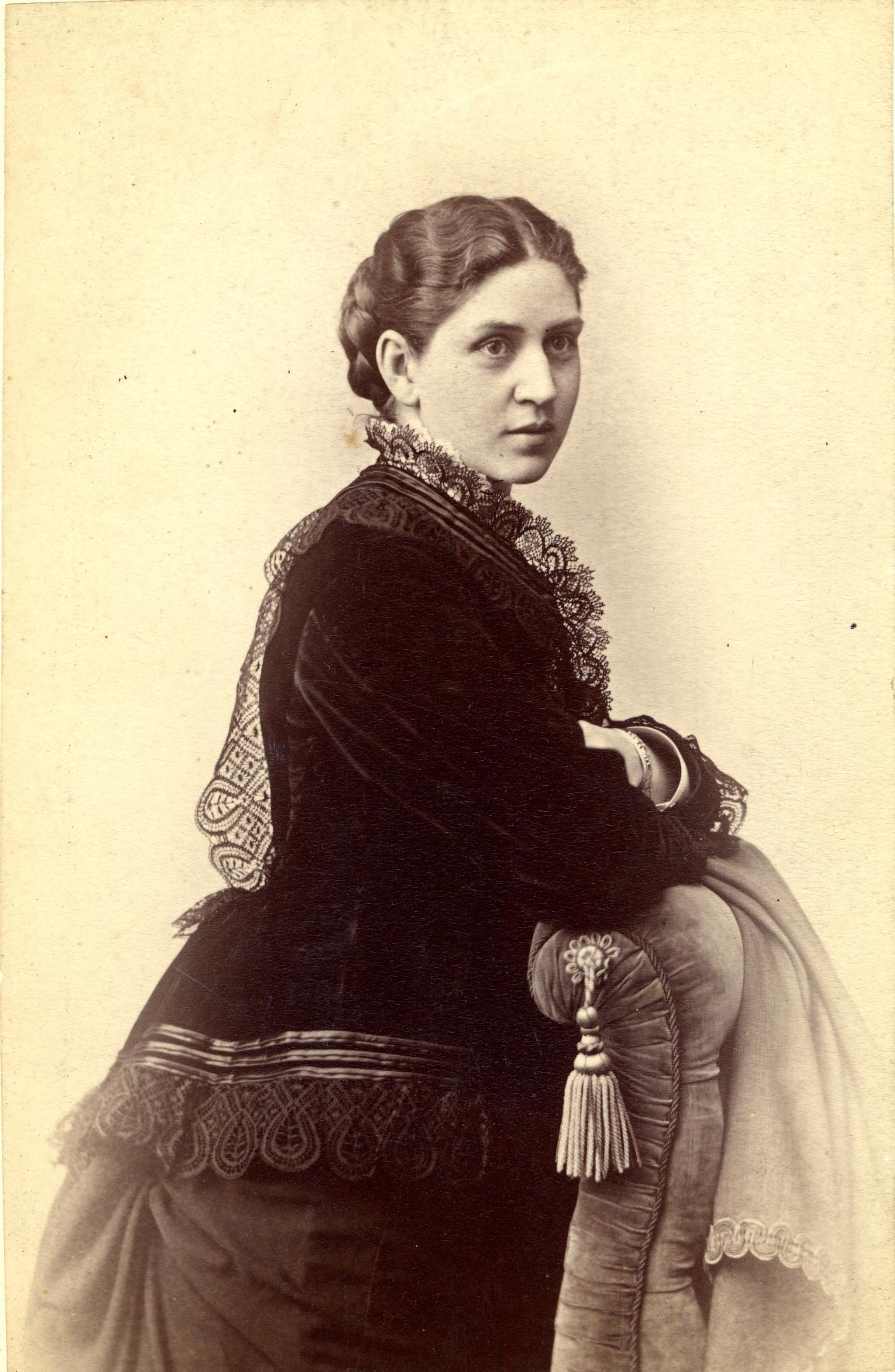
University of Michigan portrait, 1876

She was always an earnest student. At an early age she entered the University of Michigan, from which she was graduated in 1876 with the degree of B. S. Afterwards she pursued post-graduate work for one year, and in 1877 received the degree of M. S.

== Career ==
In September 1877, she was engaged as instructor in microscopic botany, and placed in charge of a botanical laboratory, which position she held for twelve years. One of the leading features of that laboratory was the amount of original work accomplished in structural botany by both teacher and pupils. On July 10, 1878, in Saginaw City, Michigan, she married Charles Henry Stowell, M.D., professor of physiology and histology in the same university.

In 1881, she co-founded the medical journal, The Microscope, and served as its editor through 1897, publishing it in Ann Arbor, Michigan, Detroit, Michigan, and Washington D.C. In 1882, she published a work entitled Microscopical Diagnosis (Detroit).

Stowell supported woman's suffrage, and was a speaker at the International Council of Women, 1888, Washington, D.C. The following year, the Stowells removed to Washington, D.C. There, she did research work at the Department of Agriculture. At the same time, she as a member of the also became a member of the Board of Trustee of the cit's public schools, and, by presidential appointment, a Trustee of the city's Girls Reform Schools.

Stowell was a member of a large number of scientific associations, both in the United States and abroad. She was a member of the Royal Microscopical Society of London, England (from 1882), president of the Western Collegiate Alumnae Association, and president of a similar organization in the East. She was a member of the Molly Varum Chapter of the Daughters of the American Revolution. Stowell was actively engaged in university extension work.

She made more than 100 contributions to scientific literature. All of her writings were fully illustrated by original drawings made from her own microscopical preparations, of which she had nearly 5,000. She did not confined herself to purely scientific literature, as she also wrote a large number of articles for popular magazines, illustrating each with charcoal, crayon or pen-and-ink sketches. While she always felt and showed the deepest interest in the welfare and success of young women in pursuit of higher education, that interest did not prevent her from being engaged most in philanthropic work.

By 1899, the Stowells had relocated to Lowell, Massachusetts, while the husband was employed by J. C. Ayers Company. She left Lowell after her husband's death in September 1928. She died February 2, 1932, at Tucson, Arizona, and was buried at Forest Hill Cemetery, Ann Arbor, Michigan.

== Selected works ==
- A study of wheat, 1879
- Microscopical diagnosis / by Chas. H. Stowell and Louisa Reed Stowell, 1882 (with Chas. H. Stowell)
- The Microscope An illustrated monthly, 1881-1897
