= Samuel J. Eldersveld =

American politician

Samuel J. Eldersveld (March 29, 1917 – March 5, 2010) was an American academic, political scientist, and Democratic politician. He served as Mayor of Ann Arbor, Michigan from 1957 to 1959.

Eldersveld, professor emeritus of political science at the University of Michigan died at his home on March 5, 2010, at the age of 92. Born in Kalamazoo, Michigan, he spent his formative years in Muskegon, Michigan, where his father was a minister in the Christian Reformed Church.

After attending Muskegon Junior College for two years, he earned a B.A. from Calvin College in 1938, and an M.A. from the University of Michigan in 1939. His PhD program in political science at the University of Michigan, begun in 1939, was interrupted when he went off to serve as a lieutenant in the Navy in World War II, during which he served as a communications officer in the Philippines. He completed his PhD in 1946, after which he became an instructor at U-M. He taught there for 54 years. "In 1957, while a professor, he was elected Mayor of Ann Arbor, and served until 1959. He was instrumental in the creation of Ann Arbor's Human Relations Commission committed to eliminating racial discrimination in housing, banking, business, and education".

== Career ==
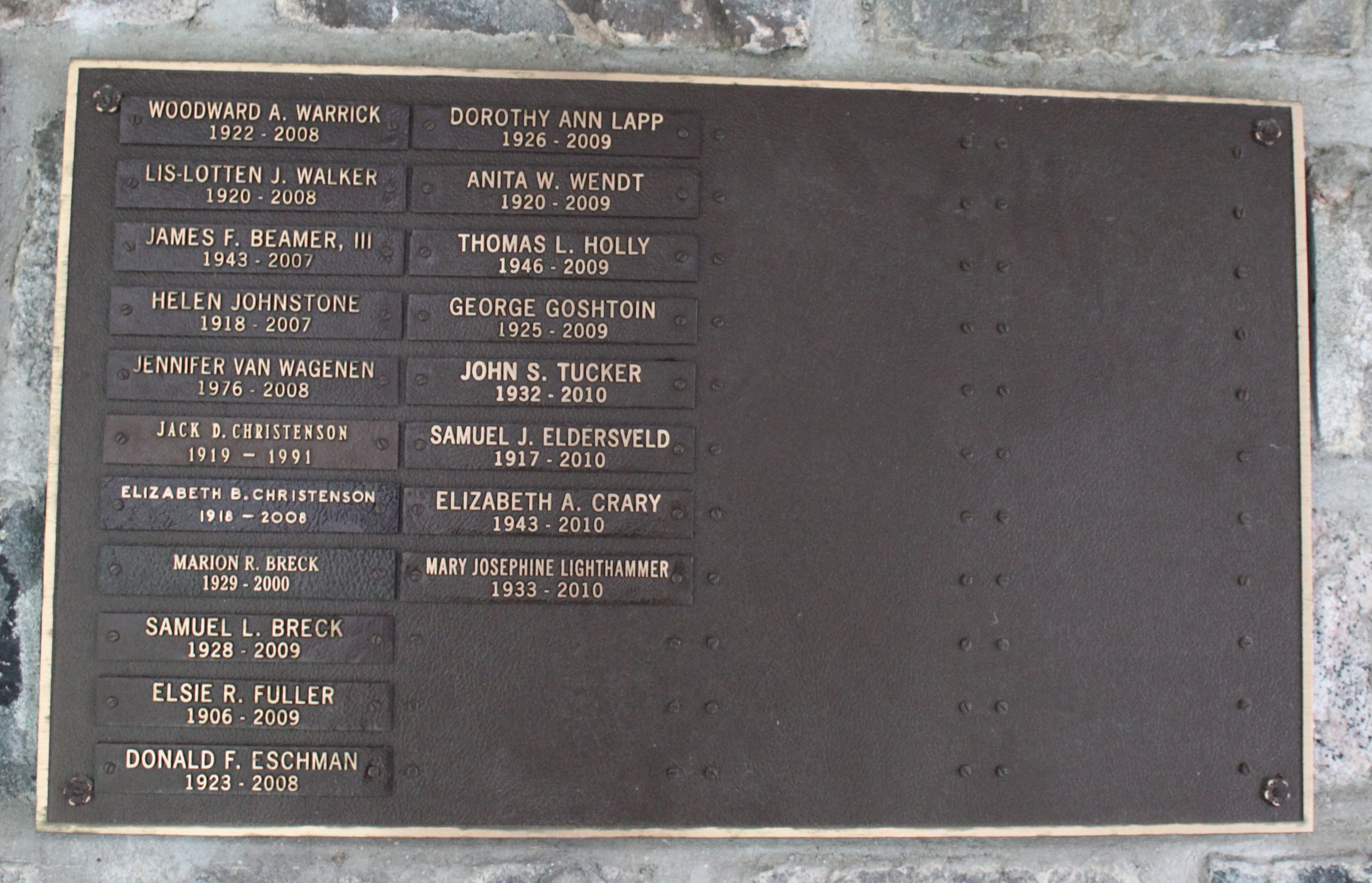
Eldersveld memorial plaque, St. Andrews Episcopal Church

Eldersveld had a long and distinguished career as a political scientist and professor. He spent most of his career as professor of political science at the University of Michigan, and was professor emeritus at that institution at the time of his death.

Eldersveld was elected mayor of Ann Arbor, Michigan as a Democrat in 1957. He ran against the incumbent Republican mayor William E. Brown, Jr. and independent candidate Dominick A. DeVarti, who had lost the 1957 Republican primary to Brown. Mayor William E. Brown, Jr., had served an unprecedented twelve consecutive years in office, and Eldersveld successfully quashed Brown's bid for a seventh term in the mayor's post. Eldersveld served one two-year term as mayor, but decided not to run for reelection in 1959, and returned to his professorship at the University of Michigan, where he served as chair of the Department of Political Science from 1964 to 1970.

In 1965 his book Political Parties: A Behavioral Analysis, won the American Political Science Association's prestigious Woodrow Wilson Foundation Award (sponsored by Princeton University) for the best book on politics and government in 1964. His subsequent research included the comparative study of political party systems in The Netherlands and India, in which he conducted field research in collaboration with researchers from those countries. He also conducted extensive research in the People's Republic of China, leading to the publication of Support for Economic and Political Change in the Chinese Countryside (1996), again co-authored with researchers from the country under study.

The American Political Science Association also recognized Eldersveld's achievements in 1986 by creating the annual Samuel J. Eldersveld Award, meant "to honor a scholar whose lifetime professional work has made an outstanding contribution to the field," and by naming Eldersveld the first year's winner.

Eldersveld died of congestive heart failure in Ann Arbor in March 2010. He was cremated and his ashes interred in the St. Andrews Episcopal Church Memorial Cloister Garden in Ann Arbor.

== Honors ==
- Awarded Woodrow Wilson Award for Best Book on Government, Politics, and International Affairs by the American Political Science Association (1965).
- Elected member of the American Academy of Arts and Sciences (1977).
- Awarded the first Samuel J. Eldersveld Lifetime Contribution Award by the American Political Science Association (1987).

== Selected book publications ==
- Eldersveld, Samuel J., and James K. Pollock. Michigan Politics in Transition: An Areal Study of Voting Trends in the Last Decade. Ann Arbor: University of Michigan Press, 1942.
- _____, and Amry Vandenbosch. Government of the Netherlands. Lexington: Bureau of Govt. Research, Univ. of Kentucky, 1947.
- _____ and Albert A. Applegate. Michigan's Recounts for Governor, 1950 and 1952: A Systematic Analysis of Election Error. Ann Arbor: University of Michigan Press, 1954.
- _____. Political Affiliation in Metropolitan Detroit. Ann Arbor: Institute of Public Administration, University of Michigan, 1957.
- _____. Political Parties: A Behavioral Analysis. Chicago: Rand McNally, 1964.
- _____, V. Jagannadham, and A. P. Barnabas. The Citizen and the Administrator in a Developing Democracy. Glenview, Ill.: Scott, Foresman, 1968.
- _____ and Bashiruddin Ahmed. Citizens and Politics: Mass Political Behavior in India. Chicago: University of Chicago Press, 1978.
- _____, Jan Kooiman, and Theo van der Tak. Bestuur en Beleid: Politiek en Bestuur in de Ogen van Kamerleden en Hoge Ambtenaren. Assen: Van Gorcum, 1980.
- _____, Jan Kooiman, and Theo van der Tak. Elite Images of Dutch Politics: Accommodation and Conflict. Ann Arbor: University of Michigan Press, 1981.
- _____. Political Elites in Modern Societies: Empirical Research and Democratic Theory. Ann Arbor: University of Michigan Press, 1989.
- _____, Lars Strömberg, and Wim Derksen. Local Elites in Western Democracies: A Comparative Analysis of Urban Political Leaders in the U.S., Sweden, and the Netherlands. Boulder, CO: Westview Press, 1995.
- _____. Party Conflict and Community Development: Postwar Politics in Ann Arbor. Ann Arbor: University of Michigan Press, 1995.
- _____. Political Parties in American Society. New York: Basic Books, 1982. Second edition, with Hanes Walton, Jr., Boston: St. Martin's, 2000.
- _____ and Mingming Shen. Support for Economic and Political Change in the China Countryside: An Empirical Study of Cadres and Villagers in Four Counties, 1990 and 1996. Lanham, Md.: Lexington, 2001.
- _____ Poor America: A Comparative-Historical Study of Poverty in the U.S. and Western Europe. Lanham, Md.: Lexington, 2007.

Political offices
Preceded by William E. Brown Jr.	Mayor of Ann Arbor, Michigan; 1957–1959	Succeeded by Cecil O. Creal
