= Conrad Noll =

American Civil War Medal of Honor recipient

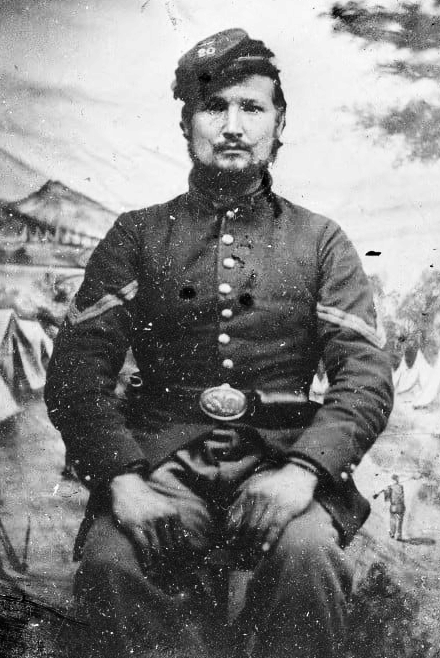
- Noll as a corporal, c. 1862–1864
- Born: February 20, 1836; Electorate of Hesse
- Died: May 26, 1925 (aged 89); Ann Arbor, Michigan, U.S.
- Burial place: Forest Hill Cemetery
- Military career
- Allegiance: United States of America
- Branch: United States Army
- Service years: 1862–1865
- Rank: Sergeant
- Unit: D Company, 20th Michigan Infantry Regiment
- Conflicts: American Civil War; Battle of Fredericksburg; Battle of Jackson; Siege of Vicksburg; Battle of Blue Springs; Siege of Knoxville; Battle of the Wilderness; Battle of Spotsylvania Court House; Battle of North Anna; Battle of Cold Harbor; Siege of Petersburg
- Awards: Medal of Honor

Conrad Noll (February 20, 1836 – May 26, 1925) was an American soldier who was awarded the Medal of Honor for his actions at the Battle of Spotsylvania Court House in 1864 during the American Civil War.

== Biography ==
Noll was born in the Electorate of Hesse (now part of Germany) in 1836 and immigrated to the United States in 1856, settling in Ann Arbor, Michigan, where he worked as a shoemaker. He enlisted in D Company of the 20th Michigan Infantry Regiment on August 11, 1862, and after fighting in the Battle of Fredericksburg, was promoted to corporal on December 25, 1862. He later saw action at the Battle of Jackson, the Siege of Vicksburg, the Battle of Blue Springs, the Siege of Knoxville, and the Battle of the Wilderness.

At the Battle of Spotsylvania Court House on May 12, 1864, Noll picked up the fallen regimental colors after their previous bearer had been killed, and fought his way to safety with them despite the enemy threatening the 20th's left flank and rear. He saw further fighting at the Battle of North Anna, the Battle of Cold Harbor, and the Siege of Petersburg, where a gunshot wound in his left thigh left him with a permanent impairment. He was promoted to sergeant on January 1, 1865, and was discharged on July 14, 1865 at Harper Hospital in Detroit.

After the war, Noll returned to Ann Arbor, where he lived with his wife and two daughters and resumed work in the shoe business. He died in Ann Arbor on May 26, 1925, at the age of 89, and was buried in the city's Forest Hill Cemetery.

== Medal of Honor ==
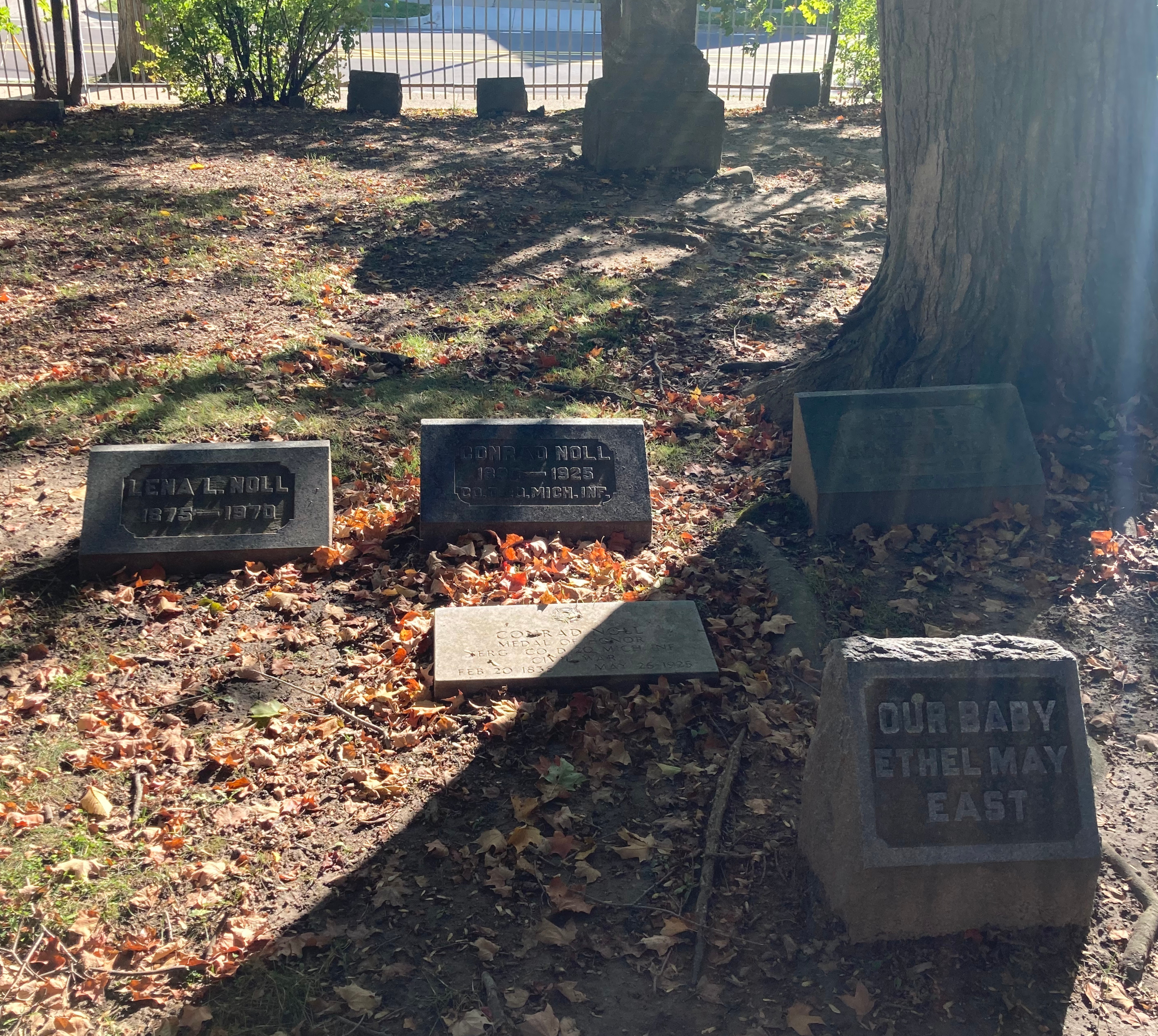
Noll's grave at Forest Hill Cemetery

In the late 1880s, the Department of War began examining unrewarded cases of heroism from the Civil War that might merit the Medal of Honor. For his actions at Spotsylvania Court House, Noll was awarded the Medal of Honor on July 28, 1896. In his reply to the Department of War, he wrote: "I shall whenever occasion occur, wear it with honor and pride over a loyal and patriotic heart and feel happy to think, that our glorious and great country enjoys the blessing of peace, happiness and unity, after such a great struggle between brothers. May it last forever."

=== Citation ===
Service: United States Army
Rank: Sergeant
Division: 20th Michigan Infantry
Action Date: May 12, 1864
Date of Issue: July 28, 1896

The President of the United States of America, in the name of Congress, takes pleasure in presenting the Medal of Honor to Sergeant Conrad Noll, United States Army, for extraordinary heroism on 12 May 1864, while serving with Company D, 20th Michigan Infantry, in action at Spotsylvania, Virginia. Sergeant Noll seized the colors, the Color Bearer having been shot down, and gallantly fought his way out with them, though the enemy were on the left flank and rear.
