= Elizabeth Farrand =

Author and librarian

Elizabeth Martha Farrand
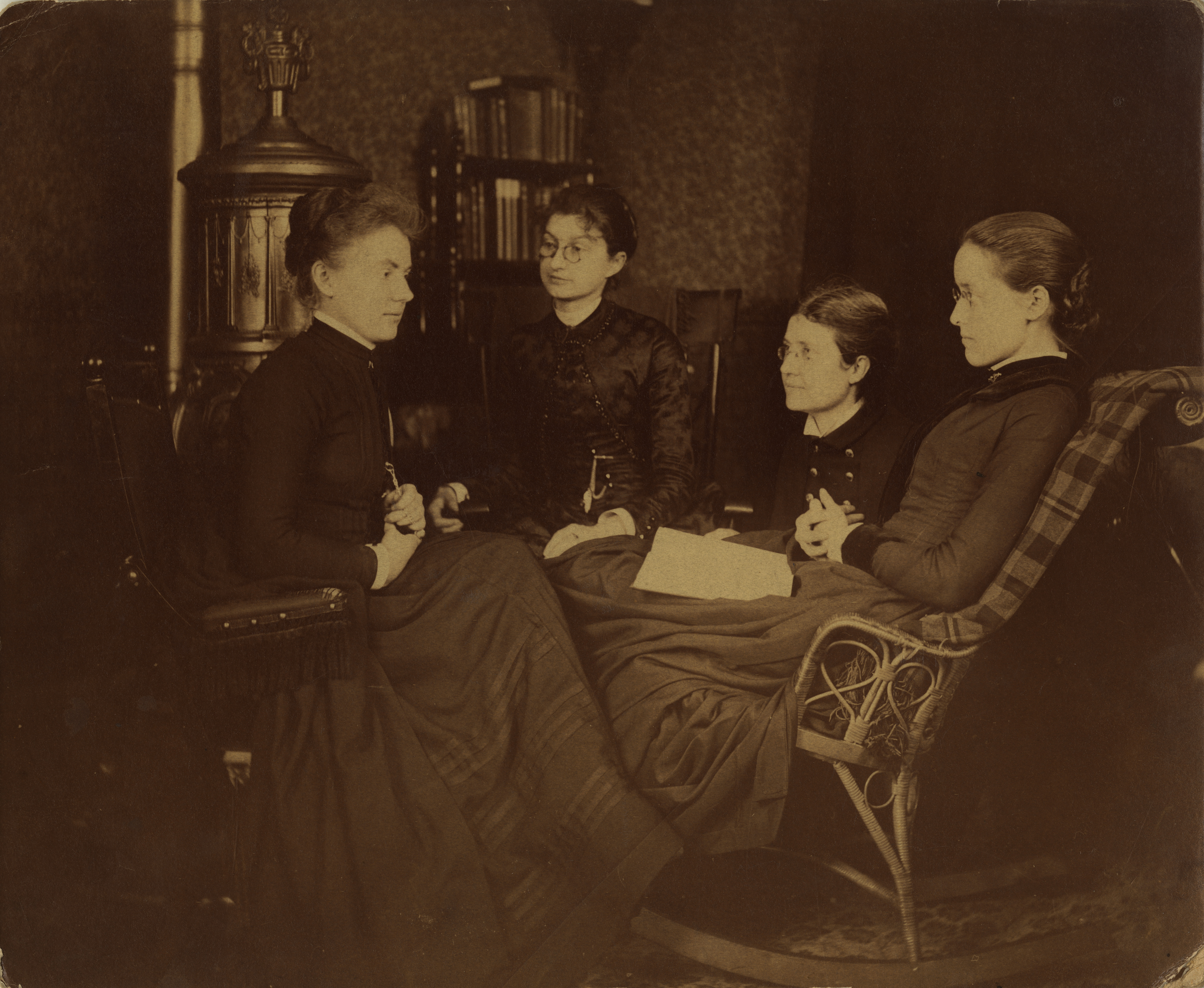
- Four University of Michigan Women Medical Students of the Eighteen Eighties. Elizabeth M. Farrand is second from the right
- Born: March 31, 1852; Ann Arbor, Michigan
- Died: August 17, 1900 (aged 48); Port Huron, Michigan
- Education: University of Michigan
- Occupations: Librarian, physician, and author

Elizabeth Martha Farrand (March 31, 1852 – August 17, 1900) was an author and librarian. She wrote the second book-length history of the University of Michigan and the one that was most frequently cited thereafter, History of The University of Michigan, in 1885. Prior to that she served as assistant librarian at the University of Michigan in Ann Arbor, Michigan, from 1878 until 1884 at a time when that position and the university librarian were the only full-time positions in the library and both were listed among the “faculty” positions in the university's general register. In a seemingly surprising career change, she left the library after being accepted to the university's medical school, from which she received an M.D. degree in 1887. After a year's residency training at the Woman's Hospital in Detroit, she spent the rest of her life in private medical practice in Port Huron, Michigan, where she died in 1900.

== Early life ==
Farrand was born in Ann Arbor, Michigan, on March 31, 1852, the daughter of Lucius S. and Frances Shaw Farrand, members of a pioneering Michigan family. Her grandfather, Bethuel Farrand moved from New York State to Detroit in 1825 and from there to Ann Arbor in the same year. At the time of his arrival there were 26 families in the city. After being involved in various businesses, including the Water Works of the City of Detroit he became the first probate judge of Washtenaw County, Michigan, of which Ann Arbor is the county seat and he served as a leader in a variety of local religious and social organizations. Elizabeth Farrand attended the public schools in Ann Arbor, graduating from the Ann Arbor High School. Her father died in October 1851 at the age of 38 just before she was born. In the 1870 census she and her mother and sister lived together in the family home along with three college student boarders. In that year the 18-year-old Elizabeth was “teaching school” according to the census. Her sister, Frances M., died in 1871 and her mother died in 1875. By the 1880 census she was single and without immediate family, living as a boarder herself in another Ann Arbor home.

Her uncle, David Osborne Farrand (1837-1883) had, meanwhile, become one of the best known doctors in the area, working as a partner in a medical practice in Detroit with Zina Pitcher, one of the Regents of the University of Michigan who played a founding role in the University of Michigan Medical School. Known locally as D. O., David Farrand was born in 1837 and had graduated from the Literary College at the University of Michigan in 1857. After studying in Germany and working in the Detroit wholesale drug business of his brother, Jacob, he graduated from the New York College of Physicians and Surgeons in 1862 and entered the Union army as an assistant surgeon. In 1866 he returned to Detroit to begin his local medical practice with Pitcher who himself died in 1871. He was involved in many activities in Detroit, including serving as president of the early Board of Health, as surgeon for the Detroit Police Department, and as Surgeon in Chief of the Michigan Central Railroad. When D. O. Farrand died in 1883 University of Michigan president James B. Angell presided over his Ann Arbor funeral. D. O. Farrand's brother Jacob Farrand (1815-1891) became a substantial businessman in Detroit and served as president of the board of the Harper Hospital there from 1860 until his death in 1891. The Farrand School for Nurses training at Harper was named after D. O. Farrand. Their brother Bethuel (1820-1901), known as B. C., became a well known lawyer in Port Huron, Michigan.

== Work at the university library ==
The University of Michigan had relocated from Detroit to Ann Arbor in 1837, opening to its first students in September 1841. Even before classes began there the board of regents began preparing for the university library, appointing a librarian, the Rev. Henry Colclazer, at their first meeting in 1837 and buying the books and collections that would undergird the teaching. Colclazer would not arrive on campus, however, until 1841 although a home for the books was provided on the third floor in the “main” campus building opened in 1840 and named Mason Hall in 1843. The library contained about 4,000 volumes there. Colclazer served as librarian until 1845, after which the title rotated among members of the faculty for 11 years. The next person to hold the title was John L. Tappan, son of then university president Henry P. Tappan, who was given the post in 1856. When President Tappan was removed from office by the regents in 1863 they also removed his son as librarian. He was replaced by former faculty member Andrew Ten Brook, who served from 1864 through 1877 when he resigned. Raymond Cazallis Davis replaced him and served from 1877 until 1905. Over these years the library expanded in Mason Hall, moved to the newly built Haven Hall in 1863 and moved into its own purpose-built building in 1883. By 1890 there were 75,000 volumes there.

Farrand began working part-time as an hourly assistant at the library under Andrew Ten Brook in the academic year 1870/71 for $.15 per hour. One historian of the library's early years, John Cushman Abbott, has written that, in hiring Farrand and another woman at this time Ten Brook was “a pioneer in a difficult field.” In his report to the Regents for the 1870-71 academic year Ten Brook wrote that “two young ladies have also been employed for a portion of the time...to aid in completing and revising the catalog. The experiment in the case of these ladies— viz: Miss Mary Pepper and Miss Lizzie Farrand— is decisive in favor of the policy of employing female assistance for some kinds of labor. There are indeed some services for which they cannot be called upon— for instance, taking down and replacing books belonging upon the higher shelves, — yet in industry and fidelity, and in quickness and accuracy of perception and execution, they are quite in advance of the average young men who could be obtained, and in consequence of there being fewer remunerative place /sic/ open to females they are ready to do faithful service at a pay much lower.”

The task of cataloging was important and difficult in these years because at that time there was no accepted system for doing so. Melvil Dewey's decimal classification system was not published until 1876 and not adopted at the University of Michigan Library until 1897. In the meantime the Library used a so-called “fixed” location system, introduced by Ten Brook, organizing shelves and the catalog according to the principle that each book should have a specific fixed place. According to Abbott this meant that books were arranged by topic and more or less in chronological order within topic. Each time a new book was received, though, the entire section's locations and catalog information had to be redone. So it was little surprise that the job of cataloger became important. With the encouragement of Davis the Regents appointed Farrand full-time Assistant Librarian, a position normally held by a man and previously held by Davis himself, at an annual salary of $400 in January 1878. By June 1878 she was included on the list of "revised" salaries set by the Board at $500 per year. In November 1883 her salary was raised to $600 per year.

== Writing university history ==
It may seem somewhat ironic that each of the first three histories of the University of Michigan was written by authors connected to the university library: Andrew Ten Brook, who had been university librarian, C. K. Adams, who had been chair of the faculty Library Committee, and Farrand. But at a time when library materials did not circulate often, this connection made sense. All the primary and secondary sources for such histories were located in the library.

The first book-length history of the University of Michigan was American state universities, their origin and progress; a history of congressional university land-grants, a particular account of the rise and development of the University of Michigan, and hints toward the future of the American university system written by Andrew Ten Brook (1814-1899) and published in 1875. Because the lengthy title of this book was frequently shortened to "American State Universities, their Origin and Progress; a History of Congressional University Land-Grants," only the most thorough realized that the book also contained a history of the university. A second brief history of the university, Historical Sketch of the University of Michigan. 1876, by C. K. Adams was, in fact, just that, a 57-page pamphlet sketching its history invited by the U.S. Commissioner of Education as part of broader effort of the Department of the Interior to celebrate the nation's centennial in 1876. Ten Brook spent more pages than Adams’ entire account on the period before the establishment of the university and on speculations about the future of higher education (210 pages on these topics). Adams’ portrayal of the interior development of the University—schools, curricula, buildings, scientific teaching and apparatus—is better developed than Ten Brook's even though the sketch is substantially shorter. In part these differences in emphases occurred because their times at the university were different. Ten Brook had been the pastor of the Baptist church in Detroit when he came to the university as professor of philosophy in 1844. He resigned that position in 1851 during a controversy over secret fraternal societies on campus. He returned to the university as librarian in 1866 and then resigned that position in 1877. Adams had graduated from the University of Michigan in 1861 and remained there teaching history until 1885. He generously acknowledged the influence of Ten Brook's work on the first page of his own. He served as faculty chair of the University Library Committee for many years.

Farrand's History of the University of Michigan was the first, therefore, written by someone who was neither a former student nor a former faculty member and the first written primarily from documents about University history, including newspapers and diaries. In part this was from necessity, of course. She had not been born when Ten Brook joined the faculty and would have been only nine years old when Adams did so. So while the first two authors had been participants in the history about which they wrote her perspective was necessarily more distant. But her self-consciousness about sources was evident from her first pages, where she wrote, unlike the other two, that “the attempt has been made to collect from many documents into one volume the story of the University,” and laments the relative paucity of sources for the story.

The three volumes differ as well in tone and coverage. Ten Brook's is by far the most ponderous and its general topic requires long stretches of reading to pick up the history of the University itself. Adams’ is crisp and balanced if somewhat boosterish on the University itself. Farrand's is the warmest, expressing the hope that “it will also excite a disposition for tale telling among the whole body of the alumni…” Perhaps reflecting the fact that his first departure from the University was, to some extent, welcomed if not required by the Regents, Ten Brook's account is the most critical of the Regents (who would force him out of the Librarian position just one year after his account was published). Differences can be seen in their accounts of one of the most famous episodes in the University's early history, the hiring and firing of the visionary, if somewhat imperious, first president, Henry P. Tappan. All historians of the University have seen the hiring of Tappan in 1852 as a bold and fortunate stroke by the Regents and his firing without notice by another board in 1863 as unfortunate and badly handled at least. Ten Brook, who was not on campus at the same time as Tappan spends the least amount of time on this period; Adams, who was both student and faculty member under Tappan writes admiringly of his accomplishments, but emphasizes the smooth transition to his successor, Erastus Haven as a tribute to the continuing strength of the University. Farrand offers the most detailed and balanced account of this period, albeit from the standpoint that his accomplishments were many and his departure unfortunate. Ten Brooks is the most dubious about the admission of women, Adams the briefest, Farrand the most thorough, concluding that for the female students “it was unpleasant to be looked upon as eccentric, but that was a trifling matter when compared with the satisfaction arising from each day’s achievement.” Farrand's account also has the most to say about the extracurricular activities of students in the period, again, because it is based in reading of the various student publications. The strengths of her work in documentary evidence at times become a weakness, as does her organization of her account by Presidential administration. As has been typical of all other accounts of the University's history there is no overarching interpretive theme to her account and topics appear to be longer or shorter depending on their documentation. Long quotations from documents can be extremely valuable today, but her account contains many of these which make for less smooth reading. But, on balance, hers is the most comprehensive and balanced account of the three. Only one review of her book was published in its own time (a not untypical number at a time when outlets for book reviews were few) and that declared the book provided "circumstantial fidelity." Although a very rough proxy for influence, Google Scholar in 2015 reports 20 citations to her work (more than to either Ten Brook or Adams) in works that are themselves cited 884 times.

== Entering medical school ==
In her history of the university Farrand ironically declared there that was one “serious evil” awaiting remedy in the University of Michigan Medical School: “its requirements for admission are very low. A slight examination is required, and trifling as it is, it excludes each year a few applicants.” But it was possible she wrote from experience because as she was finishing her book in 1884 the Regents approved her request to move to part-time status during the 1885/85 academic year so she could attend the university's medical school. There is no firm evidence of why she made this decision but its timing might have been related to the death of her uncle, D. O. in 1883. The out-pouring of grief and tributes to him at his Ann Arbor funeral was striking. If one had any interest in medical practice at all his life demonstrated the impact it could have.

When Farrand joined the medical school as a student in it had no academic prerequisite requirement except a high school diploma but the medical degree program took two years, longer than at many other medical schools at the time. Courses, including anatomy, were taught with both sexes in the same room and repeated the same material in the first and second years. By the late 1870s there had been more female graduates of the medical school than any other school or college at the university and in the class of 1887 in which Farrand graduated, there were 81 who received their degrees, 16 of them women. The 1880s would be a high point for female medical students until the 1980s, according to historian Ruth Bordin. Farrand's near classmate, Bertha Van Hoosen, who graduated in 1888, noted in her autobiography, “Petticoat Surgeon” that resistance to women in the medical school was minimal and the derogatory term “hen medics” was normally used to refer to the female medical students only by those outside the medical school. But she also quoted the lectures of the famous and beloved Medical School Professor Corydon Ford as containing statements like “Inguinal region, gentlemen, inguinal region,” as if the women were not in the room. Both Farrand and Van Hoosen took traineeships at the Detroit Woman's hospital after their graduation from medical school. Van Hoosen may have replaced Farrand at the end of hers. These positions offered primarily training in obstetrics and gynecology according to Van Hoosen, because the Detroit Women's hospital dealt only with “delinquent” girls who had become pregnant without husbands. Upon completion of that training Farrand moved to Port Huron to open a private medical practice. Her uncle, B. C., practiced law in the same city. In the 1890 Port Huron City Directory she is listed as practicing and living at 624 Court Street in Port Huron.

== Death ==
When the census taker arrived at the home of attorney Bethuel C. Farrand in Port Huron in June 1900 the residents included him, his wife, and his niece, Elizabeth M., a doctor, along with one servant and one nurse. Elizabeth Farrand was dying that summer and had moved in with her uncle. She had been diagnosed with breast cancer in 1898, treated for it twice during lengthy stays at Harper Hospital, and would die of it just two months later on August 17, 1900. She is buried in the Farrand family plot in Forest Hill Cemetery, Ann Arbor, Michigan.

== Honors and impact ==
When she died, two male Port Huron doctors wrote a tribute to her declaring that she was a “truly noble woman,” who numbered among her friends “practically everyone in Port Huron who had the honor and privilege of her acquaintance.” They noted that she had been president of the Northeastern District Medical Society, the Ladies Library Annex, and the Academy of Science. Her obituaries in the Ann Arbor newspaper were headlined “Respected By Everyone,” and noted as well that her history of the University of Michigan had received much commendation for its accuracy.” In fact she had been a kind of “triple” pioneer. It was remarkable that she became the first female to be appointed by the board of regents to the assistant librarian positions only eight years after the first women were admitted to the university. At that time she would have been one of the highest-ranking women on the campus. And she was the only woman to hold that position in the nineteenth century. She joined the socially pioneering women, who came to the University of Michigan Medical School in its first fifteen years of co-education. And she was the first and – to date – only woman to write a general history of the University of Michigan.
