= Old West Side Historic District =

- U.S. National Register of Historic Places
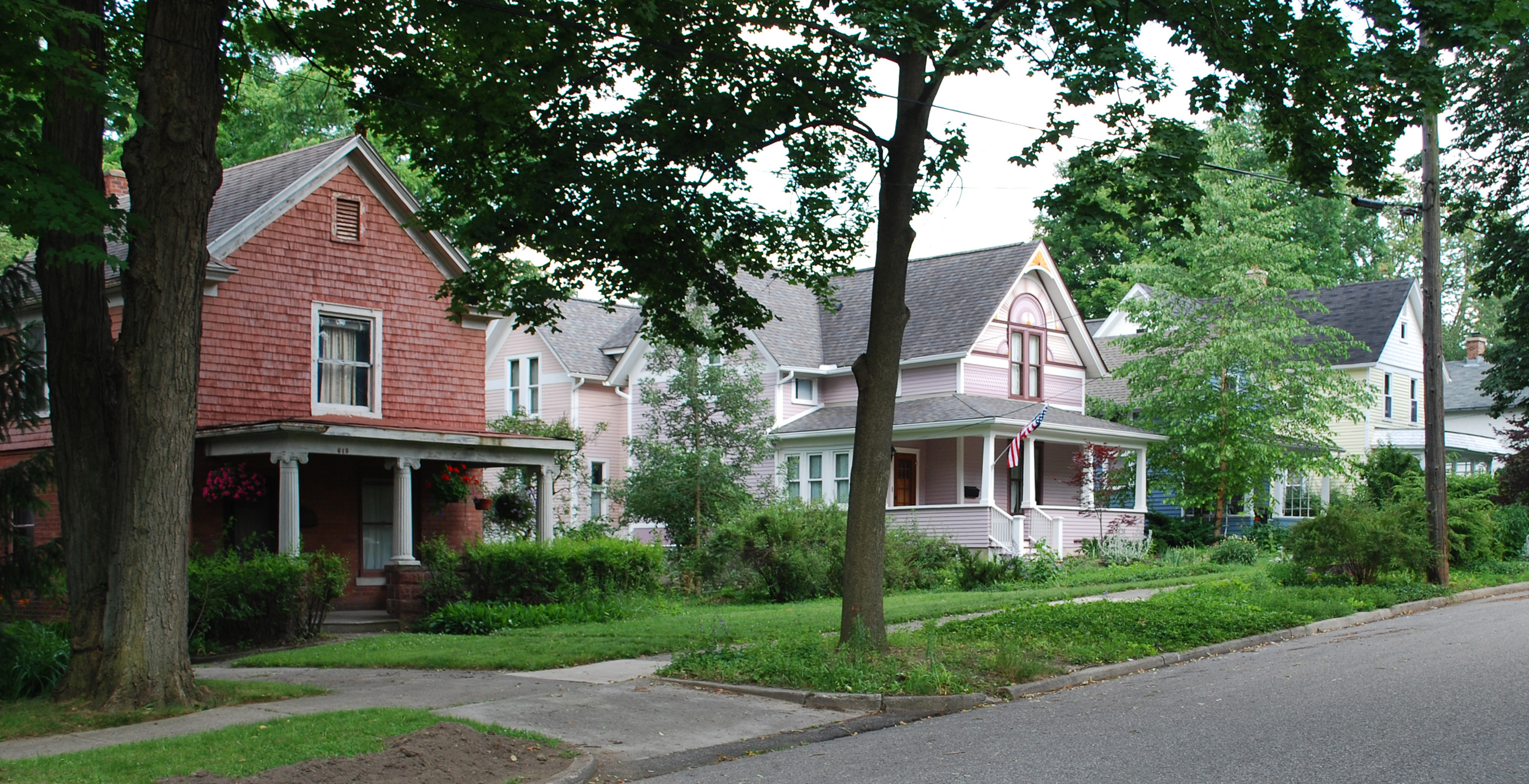

- Location within Michigan Location within the United States
- Interactive map
- Location: Bounded roughly by 7th, Main, and Huron Sts., Pauline Blvd., and Crest Ave., Ann Arbor, Michigan
- Coordinates: 42°16′26″N 83°45′23″W
- Area: 250 acres (100 ha)
- Architect: John Lucas, John Koch
- Architectural style: Colonial Revival, Bungalow/craftsman, Gable-front 19th-early 20th-century
- NRHP reference No.: 72000661
- Added to NRHP: April 14, 1972

The Old West Side Historic District is a primarily residential historic district located in Ann Arbor, Michigan and roughly bounded by 7th Street, Main Street from Pauline to Madison and railroad tracks from Madison to Liberty, Huron Street, Pauline Boulevard, and Crest Avenue. It was listed on the National Register of Historic Places in 1972.

The Old West Side contains a range of architecture and streetscapes that are especially characteristic of 19th century midwestern America. In 1967, the non-profit Old West Side Association was formed to promote neighborhood conservation.

== Description ==
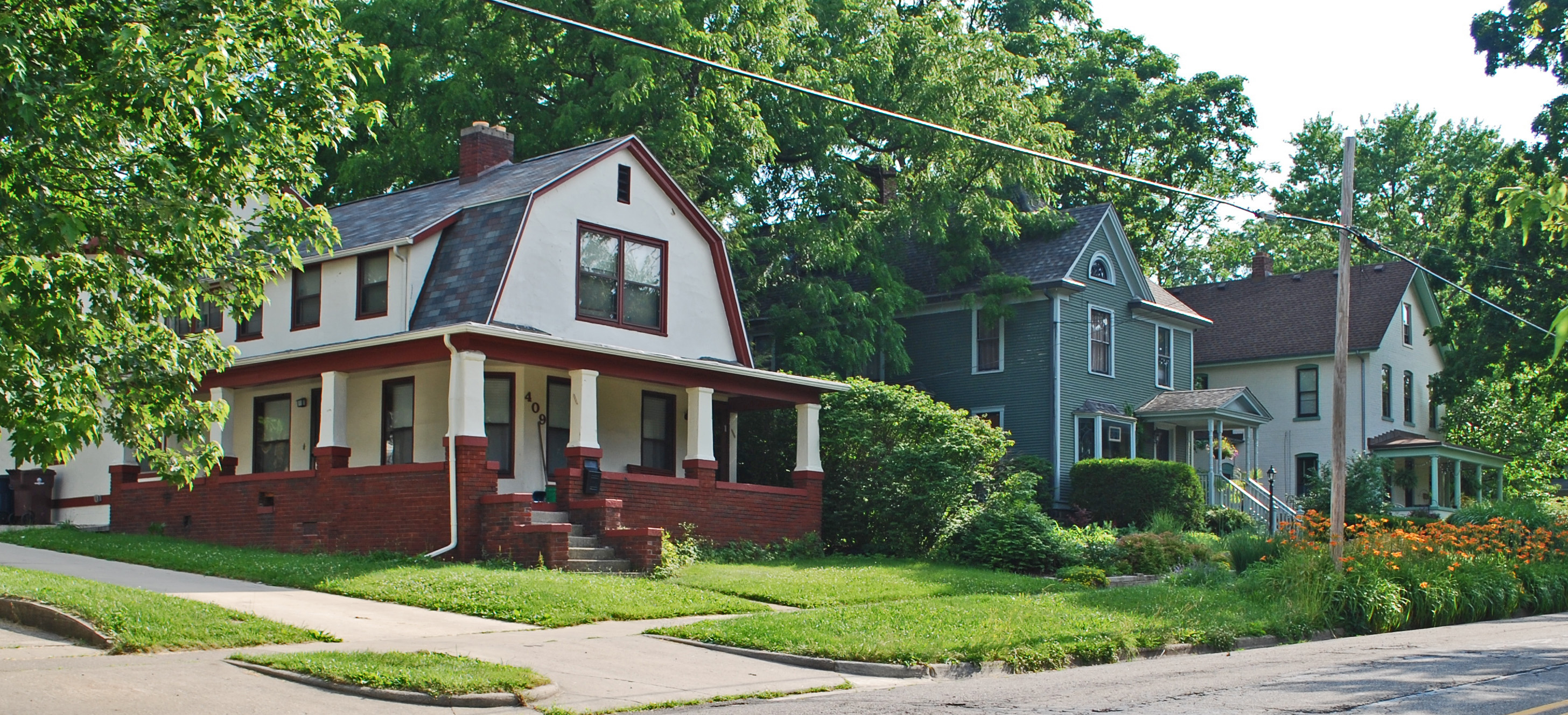

The Old West Side contains primarily small, one family homes located on tree-lined streets. These houses are typically two stories in height with six or seven rooms. About 85% of the houses are of frame construction, and the majority are clad with clapboard. Also included are houses with shingled or stuccoed exteriors, and about 15% of the houses are brick. Many of the houses have front gabled roofs and a wide pillared front porch. The larger houses, predominantly along West Liberty, in the neighborhood are generally irregular in plan, have additional side porches, and contain more architectural detail and elaborate ornamentation.

The neighborhood contains nearly every prominent architectural style used in the period 1860-1914. is represented in the Old West Side. These most prevalent styles include Italian villas, Queen Anne ornamental houses, classic revival houses, small plain New England and colonial revival styles. The neighborhood also includes Gothic cottages, Colonial and Georgian revival mansions, American picturesque, Tudor, stick, mansard and "carpenter's delight" houses, along with houses that are an eclectic mixture.

== History ==
In 1845, William Maynard purchased a large parcel of land just west of Ann Arbor and began subdividing it into lots. Maynard's property encompassed most of what is now the historic district. The new section attracted German immigrants who had settled in and near Ann Arbor. In the years following the Civil War, the local economy boomed, with industries starting up and attracting workers, many of whom filled up the lots in Maynard's subdivision. The neighborhood was settled, with houses being built on lots up through World War I.

However, after World War II, the Old West Side began to decline. Many of the houses were old, and the residents were moving out into newer homes. The larger homes in the neighborhood were being cut up into duplexes or apartments, and some were demolished to build apartments. In 1967, the Old West Side Association was formed to promote conservation of the neighborhood. In the years following, a new generation of residents moved into the neighborhood.
