= Joseph Kemp (Medal of Honor) =

American Civil War Medal of Honor recipient

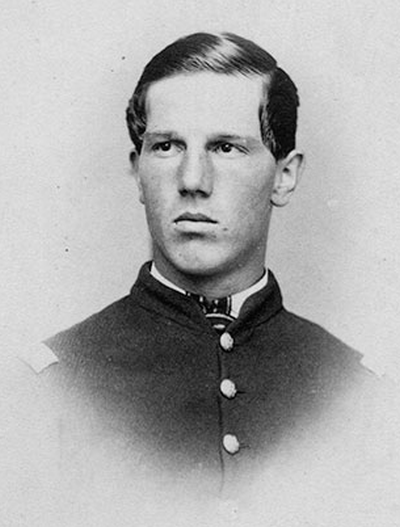
- Kemp in 1865
- Born: Joseph Bell Kemp; July 1, 1844; Lima, Ohio, U.S.
- Died: July 13, 1917 (aged 73); Ann Arbor, Michigan, U.S.
- Burial place: Forest Hill Cemetery
- Military career
- Allegiance: United States of America
- Branch: United States Army
- Service years: 1861–1865
- Rank: Captain
- Unit: D Company, 5th Michigan Infantry Regiment
- Conflicts: American Civil War; Battle of Seven Pines; Battle of Chancellorsville; Battle of Gettysburg; Battle of the Wilderness; Siege of Petersburg
- Awards: Medal of Honor

Joseph Bell Kemp (July 1, 1844 – July 13, 1917) was an American soldier who was awarded the Medal of Honor for his actions at the Battle of the Wilderness in 1864 during the American Civil War.

== Biography ==
Kemp was born in Lima, Ohio, in 1844 and worked as a painter before enlisting in the 5th Michigan Infantry Regiment on August 19, 1861. He was promoted to corporal in April 1862 and was wounded at the Battle of Seven Pines on May 31, 1862. He was promoted to sergeant in September 1862, and was wounded twice more at the Battle of Chancellorsville and the Battle of Gettysburg (where he fought as a first sergeant) in 1863.

At the Battle of the Wilderness on May 6, 1864, Kemp captured the colors of the 31st North Carolina Infantry Regiment by ripping them from the staff held by the Confederate color bearer, for which he was recommended for the Medal of Honor. Kemp was a prisoner of war from June to November 1864 after being captured at the Siege of Petersburg, though he returned to his regiment in January 1865, where he was commissioned as a second lieutenant. He was mustered out on July 5, 1865, shortly after his promotion to captain. For gallantry in combat, Kemp was awarded the Kearny Cross, a non-government honor given directly by army officers.

After the war, Kemp settled in Ann Arbor, Michigan, where he died on July 13, 1917, at the age of 73, and was buried in the city's Forest Hill Cemetery.

== Medal of Honor ==
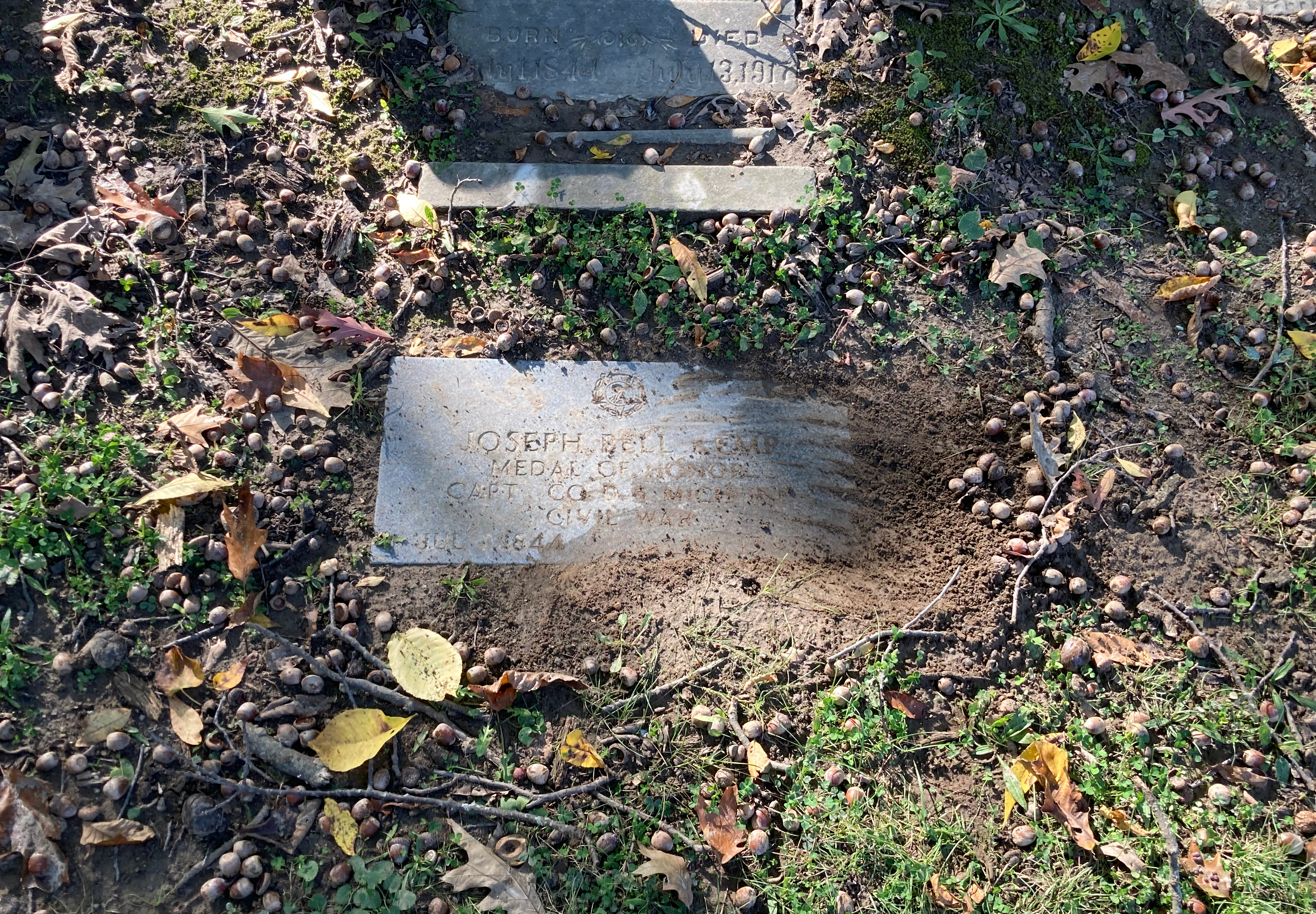
Kemp's grave at Forest Hill Cemetery

For his feat at the Battle of the Wilderness, Kemp was recommended for the Medal of Honor by Major General George Meade, and the award was ready for presentation on December 1, 1864. Kemp, however, never received the medal, possibly because he had been a prisoner of war in the months leading up to that date. In 1897, Kemp was notified by the Department of War that the medal was on file at its office, and Kemp finally received it on July 14, 1909.

=== Citation ===
Service: United States Army
Rank: First Sergeant
Division: 5th Michigan Infantry
Action Date: May 6, 1864
Date of Issue: December 1, 1864

The President of the United States of America, in the name of Congress, takes pleasure in presenting the Medal of Honor to First Sergeant Joseph Bell Kemp, United States Army, for extraordinary heroism on 6 May 1864, while serving with Company D, 5th Michigan Infantry, in action during the Wilderness Campaign, Virginia, for capture of flag of 31st North Carolina (Confederate States of America) in a personal encounter.
