= John Allen (pioneer) =

American pioneer and co-founder of Ann Arbor, Michigan

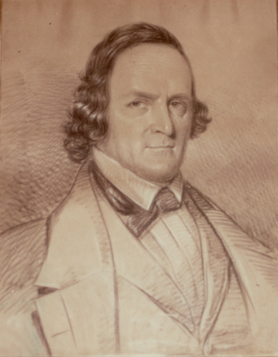
- Born: May 17, 1797; Augusta County, Virginia
- Died: March 11, 1851 (aged 53) near San Francisco, California
- Occupations: Businessman, lawyer
- Known for: co-founding Ann Arbor

John Allen (May 17, 1797 – March 11, 1851) was an American pioneer and a co-founder, along with Elisha Rumsey, of the American city of Ann Arbor, Michigan.

== Early life ==
John Allen, the son of a wealthy farmer, was born in Augusta County, Virginia, on May 17, 1797. He had two children with his first wife, Mary Crawford: James and Elizabeth. After Crawford's death, he married Ann I. (Barry) McCue, a widow with two sons: John and Thomas. Both Crawford and McCue had large inheritances, but historical records maintain that Allen left Virginia primarily to escape financial difficulties.

Allen left Virginia in fall 1823 with a herd of cattle which he intended to sell in Baltimore. From Baltimore, he went to Buffalo, New York, where he stayed for two months while looking for an associate. He moved on to Detroit in January 1824, where he met Elisha Rumsey. Rumsey was also looking for an opportunity to escape the mistakes of his past and work toward a better future.

== Ann Arbor ==
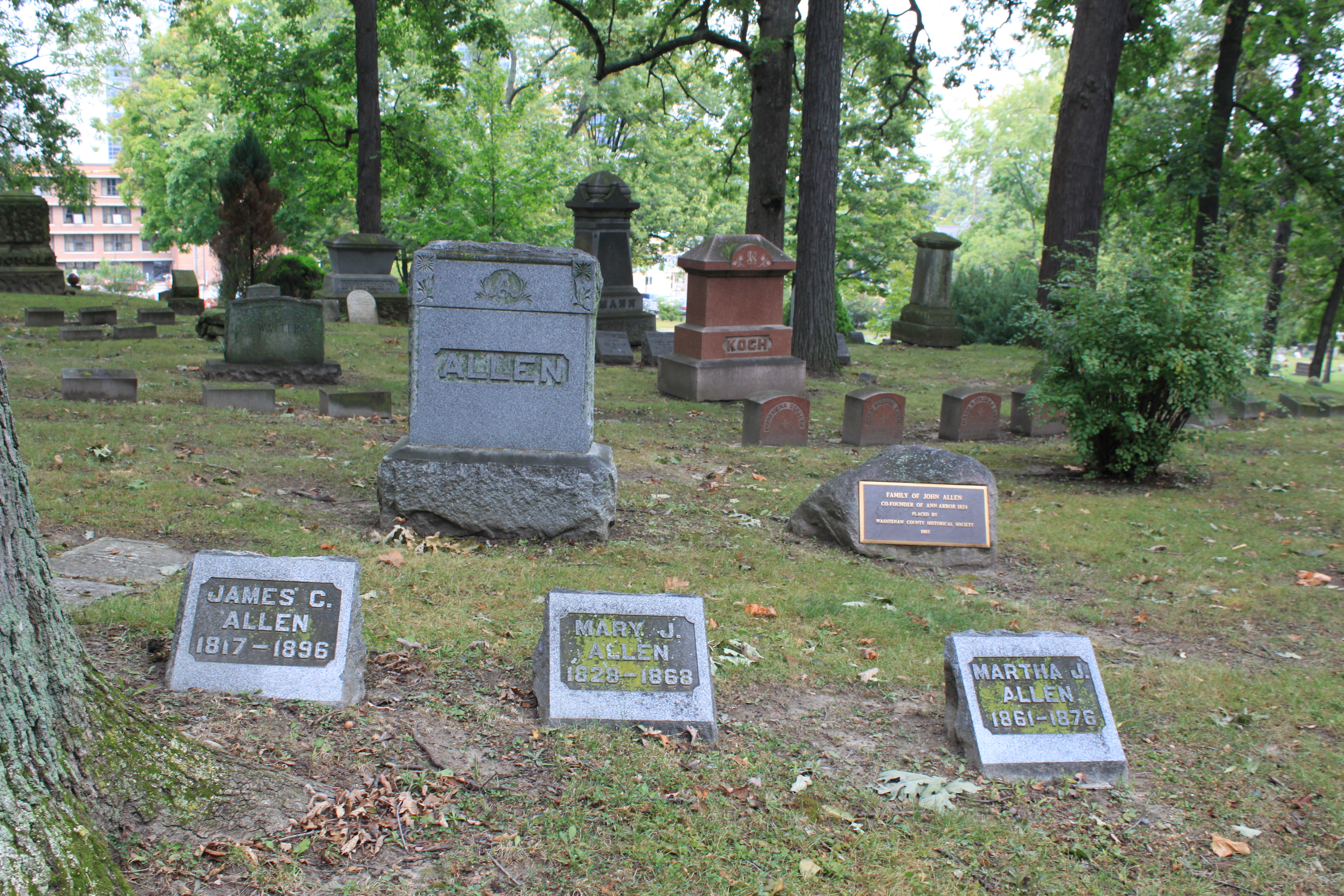
Memorial to John Allen & family, Forest Hill Cemetery, Ann Arbor

In early February 1824, Allen and Rumsey left Detroit. After choosing their site, they returned to Detroit on February 14 to register their claims at the federal land office. Allen, the wealthier of the two men, purchasing 480 acres (1.9 km^{2}) for $600. Rumsey purchased 160 acres (0.65 km^{2}) for $200. They also purchased the right to have their village designated the county seat for $1,000. On May 25, the town plot was registered in Wayne County. Initially, the name of the town was written "Annarbour", but thereafter it appeared as two words. According to Russell Bidlack's Ann Arbor's First Lady: Events in the Life of Ann I. Allen (1998), Ann Arbor was named in honor of John Allen's wife, Ann. Other writers have suggested that Ann Arbor was named for both Ann Allen (wife of Allen) and Mary Ann Rumsey (wife of Rumsey).

Allen found a new start in Ann Arbor, as well as financial success. He became an owner of several thousand acres of land in the western part of Michigan. He was directly involved in many of the civic duties and functions of Ann Arbor, and was largely responsible for its initial success. He promoted Ann Arbor as a great place to live, establishing its first post office in 1825, and becoming its first postmaster. He also served in other positions, including Coroner and Justice of the Peace. Having studied law with James Kingsley, he was admitted to the Bar of Washtenaw County in 1832. Before becoming a lawyer, he unsuccessfully ran for state representative. He later won a seat in the state senate, serving from 1845 to 1848. Allen and Samuel Dexter established Western Emigrant, Ann Arbor's first newspaper, which they used to promote their anti-Mason views.

== Later life ==
Having become very influential in Ann Arbor, Allen moved to New York to better manage his financial affairs. He was unsuccessful in New York and by 1850, he had lost most of his wealth in real estate. Looking for ways to regain his fortune, he went west in 1850 to try his luck in the California Gold Rush. He died on March 11, 1851, near San Francisco.
