= Elisha Rumsey =

American pioneer and Ann Arbor cofounder

Elisha Walker Rumsey
- Born: c. 1785; Sharon, Connecticut
- Died: August 1827 (aged 41–42); Ann Arbor
- Known for: co-founding Ann Arbor

Elisha Walker Rumsey (c. 1785 - August 1827) was an American pioneer and co-founder of the U.S. city of Ann Arbor. He and John Allen founded Ann Arbor in 1824.

== Early life ==
Little is known about Rumsey's early life. He was born in Sharon, Connecticut, not in New York as most stories claimed.

== Ann Arbor ==
Rumsey met with John Allen in January 1824 in Detroit. Rumsey and Allen left Detroit together, reaching the site of present-day Ann Arbor in early February. By February 14, they had returned to Detroit to register their claims at the federal land office. Rumsey, the less wealthy of the two, purchased 160 acres (0.65 km^{2}) of land for $200. Allen purchased 480 acres (1.9 km^{2}) for $600. They also purchased the right to have their village designated the county seat for $1,000. On May 25, the town plot was registered in Wayne County. Initially, the name of the town was written "Annarbour", but thereafter it appeared as two words. According to Russell Bidlack's Ann Arbor's First Lady: Events in the Life of Ann I. Allen (1998), Ann Arbor was named in honor of John Allen's wife, Ann. Other writers have suggested that Ann Arbor was named for both of the wives of its founders, Ann Allen (wife of Allen) and Mary Ann Rumsey (wife of Rumsey).

Rumsey's house, completed in 1825, was the first structure to be built in the new town. Named Washtenaw Coffee House, it became the first hotel and cafe in Ann Arbor. Many new settlers stayed in Rumsey's hotel until their houses were built. Unlike Allen, who was concerned with business functions of Ann Arbor, Rumsey was more involved in the human aspect of the city, providing housing and meals to new residents.

== Personality of Rumsey ==
Little is known about Elisha Rumsey's personality. A reminiscence from a Mr. and Mrs. Anderson described him as "a commonplace man both in ability and appearance”. Another reminiscence, by a Mr. Morton, described him as "a man of more than ordinary intelligence, and . . . he knew how to keep a hotel.

== Death ==
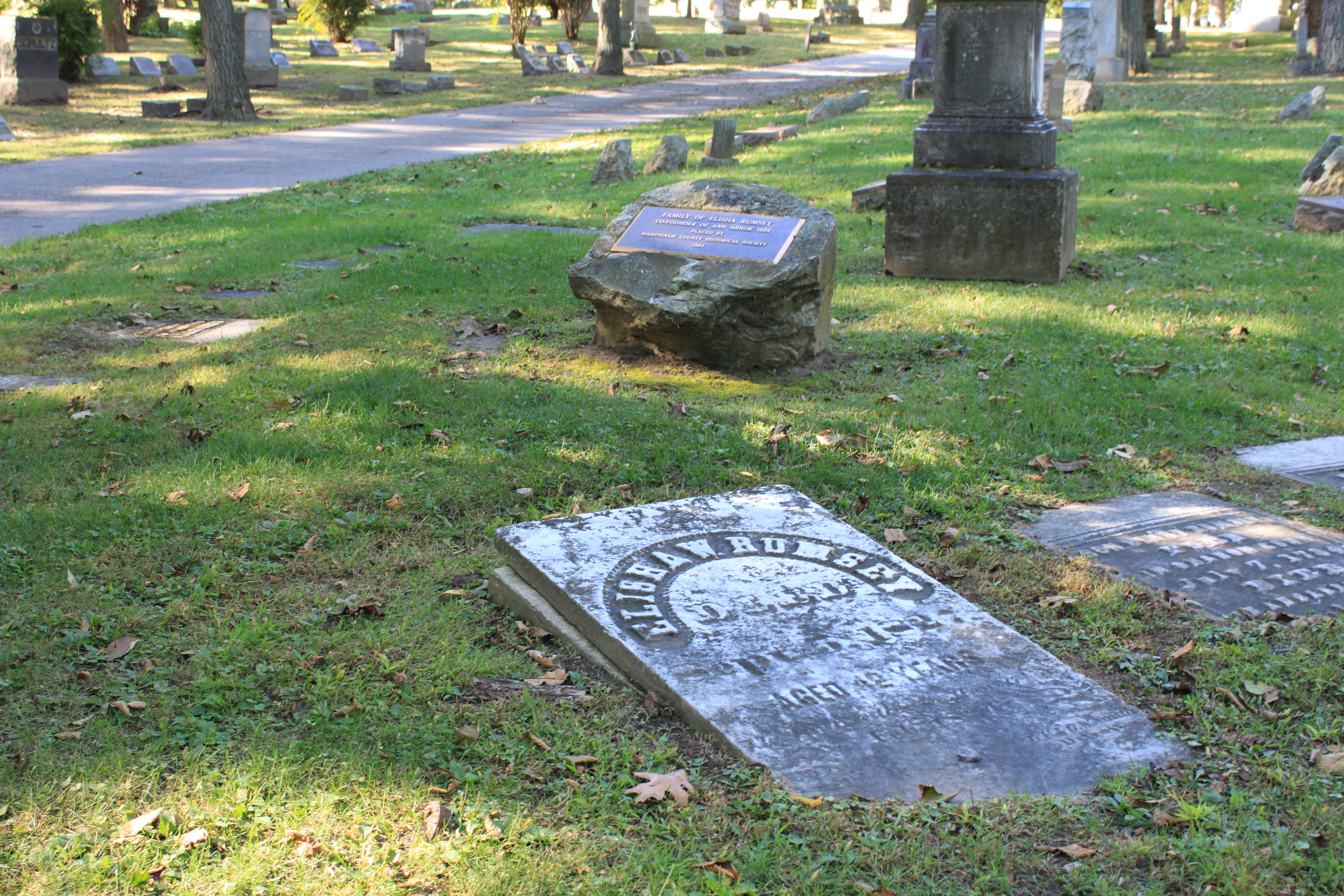
Rumsey grave and memorial

Rumsey died in August 1827 due to a fever. He was buried in Forest Hill Cemetery, Ann Arbor, with a headstone bearing the inscription, "The first settler in Ann Arbor". He is the only town founder buried in Ann Arbor.
