= List of transgender public officeholders in the United States =

This is a list of openly transgender, intersex, and nonbinary officeholders by office in the United States. The first openly trans public officeholder in the United States was Joanne Conte, elected to Arvada, Colorado's City Council in 1991.

As of January 2025, the highest-ranking public official is Sarah McBride, who represents Delaware's at-large congressional district in the United States House of Representatives. The highest ranking appointed official was Rachel Levine, who was an Assistant Secretary for Health from 2021 to 2024.

This list is arranged chronologically by politicians' first years in each office. Some officeholders listed were not elected while out as trans, and either came out or were outed at a later date.

== Background ==
As of November 2026, at least 119 trans, non-binary, intersex, and genderqueer officials served in public elected positions. This represented a sevenfold increase from 2018, when only 16 openly trans individuals had been elected to office in the United States. On November 7, 2017, eight trans individuals were elected to public office in the U.S.. This was at the time the most trans individuals elected to office in a single day.

== Federal offices ==
=== Federal executive ===
Name	Office(s)	Start	End	President(s)	Notes
Dylan Orr	Special Assistant to Assistant Secretary of Labor	December 7, 2009	June 12, 2015	Barack Obama (2009–2017)	Orr is the first openly trans person to be appointed in a presidential administration.
Amanda Simpson	Senior Technical Advisor to the Bureau of Industry and Security; First Deputy Assistant Secretary of Defense for Operational Energy	December 29, 2009	January 19, 2017	Barack Obama (2009–2017)	Simpson is the first openly trans woman to be appointed in a presidential administration. She is also the first openly trans person to lead a United States Department of Defense organization.
Rachel Levine	Assistant Secretary of Health and Human Services for Health	March 26, 2021	January 20, 2025	Joe Biden (2021–2025)	Levine is the first openly trans person to hold an office that requires Senate confirmation. She was the highest-ranking openly trans official in the US and the first openly trans four-star admiral.
Shawn Skelly	Assistant Secretary of Defense for Readiness; Acting Under Secretary of Defense for Personnel and Readiness	July 22, 2021	January 20, 2025	Joe Biden (2021–2025)	

=== Federal legislative ===
Name	Party	State	Office(s)	Start	End	Notes
Sarah McBride	Democratic	Delaware	Member of the U.S. House of Representatives for Delaware's at-large congressional district	2025	present	McBride is the first openly trans person to be elected to the United States Congress. Previously, McBride served in the Delaware State Senate; in 2020, she was the first trans person elected to any state's upper house.

== State offices ==
=== State executive ===
Name	Party	State	Office(s)	Start	End	Notes
Kim Coco Iwamoto	Democratic	Hawaii	Hawaii Board of Education	2006	2011	Iwamoto was the first trans person elected to statewide office in Hawaii, before the board moved to being appointed at the end of her final term.
Lauren Scott	Republican	Nevada	Commissioner, Nevada Equal Rights Commission	2012	2016	Appointed position. Scott was also the first openly trans person to win a Republican primary election for a state legislative office, running for the Nevada Assembly's 30th District in 2014.

=== State legislative ===
Name		Party	State	Office(s)	Start	End	Notes
	Althea Garrison	Republican	Massachusetts	Massachusetts House of Representatives, 5th Suffolk district (Note: Not openly trans when elected. Outed or came out at a later date.)	1993	1995	Garrison is the first trans person to serve in a state legislature, but she was not openly trans when first elected in 1992. She was later outed while in office. Garrison later served in the Boston City Council by appointment to fill a vacancy in 2018.
	Stacie-Marie Laughton	Democratic	New Hampshire	New Hampshire House of Representatives, Ward 4 (Note: Elected, but did not serve in office.)	2012	Elect	Though Laughton was the first openly trans person elected to a state legislature in 2012, she was forced to resign prior to inauguration after past felonies became public.
	Stacie-Marie Laughton	Democratic	New Hampshire	New Hampshire House of Representatives, District 31	2020	2022	She ran again and won in 2020, and won her reelection in 2022, but she ultimately resigned in December 2022 after being arrested for stalking.
	Alisson Turcotte	Democratic	New Hampshire	New Hampshire House of Representatives, 11th Merrimack district (formerly 22nd Merrimack)	2012	2024	Came out as trans after her 2022 re-election.
Danica Roem, United States	Danica Roem	Democratic	Virginia	Virginia House of Delegates, 13th district	2018	2024	First openly trans person to be elected and served in a state legislature in 2017; first trans state senator elected in the Southern United States in 2023; first openly trans person to serve in both houses of a state legislature in 2024.
Danica Roem, United States	Danica Roem	Democratic	Virginia	Virginia Senate, 30th district	2024	present	First openly trans person to be elected and served in a state legislature in 2017; first trans state senator elected in the Southern United States in 2023; first openly trans person to serve in both houses of a state legislature in 2024.
	Brianna Titone	Democratic	Colorado	Colorado House of Representatives, 27th district	2019	present	
	Gerri Cannon	Democratic	New Hampshire	New Hampshire House of Representatives, Strafford 18th district (now 12th district)	2018	2024	
	Lisa Bunker	Democratic	New Hampshire	New Hampshire House of Representatives, Rockingham 18th District	2018	2022	
	Sarah McBride	Democratic	Delaware	Delaware Senate	2021	2025	First trans member of a state Senate, elected in November 2020.
	Stephanie Byers	Democratic	Kansas	Kansas House of Representatives, 86th district	2021	2023	The first openly trans woman of color to serve in and to be elected to a state legislature and the first Native American trans person to hold elected office in the United States.
	Taylor Small	Democratic; Progressive	Vermont	Vermont House of Representatives, Chittenden 6–7 district (now Chittenden-21)	2021	2025	
	Mo Turner	Democratic	Oklahoma	Oklahoma State House of Representatives, district 88	2021	2025	The first non-binary state legislator. While in office, Turner was the only trans state legislator of color.
	Zooey Zephyr	Democratic	Montana	Montana House of Representatives, district 95	2023	present	She is the first openly trans elected official in the Montana Legislature.
	Emily Dievendorf	Democratic	Michigan	Michigan House of Representatives, 77th district	2023	present	They were the first openly nonbinary state representative in Michigan.
	Leigh Finke	Democratic (DFL)	Minnesota	Minnesota House of Representatives, District 66A	2023	present	She is the first openly trans elected official in the Minnesota Legislature.
Liish Kozlowski (they/them)	Liish Kozlowski	Democratic (DFL)	Minnesota	Minnesota House of Representatives, District 8B	2023	present	Kozlowski was the first openly trans nonbinary representative in the Minnesota Legislature, first elected in 2022. As of 2026, they are the only two-spirit legislator in the U.S.
	James Roesener	Democratic	New Hampshire	New Hampshire House of Representatives, 22nd Merrimack	2023	present	He is the first trans man elected to a state legislature.
	SJ Howell	Democratic	Montana	Montana House of Representatives, District 100	2023	present	Became the first nonbinary state legislator in Montana when they were elected.
	Brion Curran	Democratic (DFL)	Minnesota	Minnesota House of Representatives, District 36B	2023	present	Curran came out as nonbinary between their 2022 and 2024 elections.
	Alice Wade	Democratic	New Hampshire	New Hampshire House of Representatives, 15th Strafford	2024	present	
	Aime Wichtendahl	Democratic	Iowa	Iowa House of Representatives, District 80	2025	present	The first trans person to serve in the Iowa legislature.
	Kim Coco Iwamoto	Democratic	Hawaii	Hawaii House of Representatives, District 25	2025	present	The first trans person elected to the Hawaii legislature. Previously the first trans person elected to statewide office in Hawaii (Board of Education, 2006).
	Billie Butler	Democratic	New Hampshire	New Hampshire House of Representatives	2025	present	
	Wick Thomas	Democratic	Missouri	Missouri House of Representatives, District 19	2025	present	The first out nonbinary person elected to state office in Missouri.
	Abi Boatman	Democratic	Kansas	Kansas House of Representatives, District 86	2026	present	
	Joanna Whaley	Democratic	Michigan	Michigan House of Representatives, 2nd district	2027	present	She is the first openly trans elected official in the Michigan Legislature.
	Allison Montgomery	Democratic	Alabama	Alabama House of Representatives, District 25	2027	present	She is the first openly trans elected official in the Alabama Legislature
	Jaelynn Scott	Democratic	Washington	Washington House of Representatives, District 37	2027	present	She is the first openly trans elected official in the Washington State Legislature
	Dina Nina Martinez-Rutherford	Democratic	Wisconsin	Wisconsin House of Representatives, district 76	2027	present	The first openly trans state legislator in Wisconsin
	Bentley Hudgins	Democratic	Georgia	Georgia House of Representatives, district 90	2027	present	The first nonbinary and first Japanese-American state legislator in Georgia, representing east Atlanta.

=== State judicial ===
Name	Party	State	Office(s)	Start	End	Notes
Victoria Kolakowski	Democratic	California	Alameda County Superior Court Judge	2011	present	Considered the first trans person elected as a judge.
Jill Rose Quinn	Democratic	Illinois	Circuit Court of Cook County Judge	2021	present	Quinn is the first openly trans person elected in Illinois.

== Local offices ==
=== Local executive ===
Name	Party	State	Office(s)	Start	End	Notes
Stu Rasmussen	Democratic	Oregon	Mayor of Silverton	2009	2015	First trans mayor in the United States. She had served as mayor of Silverton, Oregon in the 1990s, before coming out as trans. She was also three times a member of the city council.
Jess Herbst	Independent	Texas	Mayor of New Hope (Note: Appointed to elected office.)	2016	2018	Herbst became the first openly trans mayor in Texas in 2016 when the then-mayor died days before the election, but still won. Herbst, who was Mayor pro-tem, was then appointed to the position. She came out as trans after being appointed to the office.
Betsy Driver	Democratic	New Jersey	Mayor of Flemington	2019	2023	She is the first openly intersex person elected mayor in the United States. Also was the first intersex person elected to any political office when elected to town council in 2017.
Lisa Middleton	Democratic	California	Mayor of Palm Springs	2021	2022	Middleton is the first openly transgender person elected mayor in California
Raúl Ureña	Independent	California	Mayor of Calexico	2023	2024	Ureña was elected in 2020 to Calexico's City Council, whose members hold rotating terms as mayor. After she came out as trans, critics launched a recall campaign against her, which succeeded in removing her from her seat.
Erica Deuso	Democratic	Pennsylvania	Mayor of Downingtown	2025	present	Deuso became Pennsylvania's first openly trans mayor when she was elected in November 2025.

=== Local legislative ===
Name	Party	State	Office(s)	Start	End	Notes
Joanne Conte	Independent	Colorado	City Council of Arvada	1991	1995	Conte is considered the first openly trans person elected to public office in the United States.
Michelle Bruce		Georgia	City Council of Riverdale	2004	2008	Bruce was sued by her political opponents for fraud because she allegedly misled voters concerning her gender. The Georgia Supreme Court ruled in favor of Bruce.
Claire Hall	Independent	Oregon	County Commissioner of Lincoln County	2004	2026	Hall transitioned in June 2018 during her fourth term as commissioner and was subsequently re-elected in 2020 and 2024. She died in office on January 4, 2026.
Jessica Orsini		Missouri	Alderwoman of Centralia	2006	2012	Elected in 2006, after being outed during a previous run in 2004. Did not run for re-election in 2012, but was appointed in 2024 to fill a vacant position on the Board of Aldermen, and was re-elected to the position in 2025.
Jessica Orsini		Missouri	Alderwoman of Centralia	2024	present	Elected in 2006, after being outed during a previous run in 2004. Did not run for re-election in 2012, but was appointed in 2024 to fill a vacant position on the Board of Aldermen, and was re-elected to the position in 2025.
Vered Meltzer		Wisconsin	City Council, District 2 of Appleton	2014	present	
Jennifer Williams	Republican	New Jersey	City Council of Trenton	2022	present	The first openly trans woman elected to a city council position in New Jersey. Re-elected in 2024.
Aime Wichtendahl	Democratic	Iowa	City Council of Hiawatha	2016	2025	The first openly trans woman elected to government in Iowa. Re-elected in 2019.
Betsy Driver	Democratic	New Jersey	Town Council of Flemington	2017	2019	First intersex person elected to public office in the U.S. Also served as mayor of Flemington, 2019–2023.
Phillipe Cunningham	Democratic	Minnesota	Minneapolis City Council, Ward 4	2018	2022	First openly trans man of color to be elected to office.
Andrea Jenkins	Democratic	Minnesota	Minneapolis City Council, Ward 8	2018	2026	Became the first openly trans black woman to be elected to office in 2017. Served as council present from 2022–2024.
Stephe Koontz		Georgia	City Council of Doraville, 3rd District	2018	present	First openly trans person elected in Georgia (Note: Michelle Bruce was elected in 2004, but only outed after her election.)
Lisa Middleton	Democratic	California	City Council of Palm Springs (member at-large, 2017–2020; 5th district, 2020–2025)	2017	2025	Also served as mayor of Palm Springs in 2021.
Althea Garrison	Independent	Massachusetts	Boston City Council, member at-large	2019	2020	Appointed as the at-large representative when Ayanna Pressley was elected to the U.S. House of Representatives in 2018. She had previously served in the Massachusetts House in the 1990s.
Kathryn Ottersten	Independent	Alaska	City Council, Seat D of Fairbanks	2019	2020	Ottersten was the first openly intersex person elected in Alaska.
Rita Schenkelberg		Oregon	City Council of Bend	2020	2022	First out trans person of color to hold elected office in Oregon and first out nonbinary person to hold municipal office in Oregon.
Liz Lyke		Alaska	Borough Assembly of Fairbanks North Star Borough	2020	2024	
Veronica Pejril	Democratic	Indiana	Common Council of Greencastle	2020	2024	The first openly trans elected official in Indiana. Currently running for Indiana State Senate, District 24.
Donna Price	Democratic	Virginia	Board of Supervisors, Scottsville Magisterial District	2020	2023	The first trans supervisor and second elected public official in the State. Elected November 2019. Retired in late 2023. Chosen as board vice chair from 2020–2023 and chair in 2023.
Rosemary Ketchum	Democratic	West Virginia	City Council of Wheeling	2020	2024	The first out trans person to be elected to public office in West Virginia, elected in June 2020.
Evelyn Rios Stafford	Democratic	Arkansas	Justice of the Peace of Washington County	2021	present	First trans woman elected in Arkansas and one of first elected Latina women in the state
Christopher Kalcich		Pennsylvania	Borough Council of Selinsgrove	2021	present	The first trans elected official in Snyder County and Central Pennsylvania.
Mary Nolan	Democratic	Oregon	Metro Council, District 5 of Portland	2021	present	Nolan has come out as nonbinary after taking office.
Ashley Shade	Democratic	Massachusetts	City Council, at-large of North Adams	2022	present	First elected to the city council in 2021, Shade became the first trans city council president in Massachusetts and only the second in the United States. Served as council vice president from 2024–2025 and as president from 2026–present.
Thu Nguyen	Democratic	Massachusetts	Worcester City Council	2022	2026	First nonbinary elected official in Massachusetts.
Clare Killman		Illinois	City Council of Carbondale	2023	present	Killman is the first trans city council member in Illinois.
Olivia Hill		Tennessee	Metropolitan Council of Nashville and Davidson County	2023	present	Hill is the first trans elected official in Tennessee.
V Fixmer-Oraiz		Iowa	Board of Supervisors of Johnson County	2023	present	First trans and nonbinary county official in Iowa.
Dina Nina Martinez-Rutherford	Independent	Wisconsin	Madison Common Council	2023	2027	The first openly trans woman elected in Wisconsin.
Tyler Titus	Democratic	Pennsylvania	City Council of Erie	2024	present	
Emma Curtis	Democratic	Kentucky	Lexington-Fayette Urban County Council, 4th District	2025	present	Believed to be the first openly trans person elected to a city office in Kentucky.
Arienne Childrey	Democratic	Ohio	St. Marys City Council, 4th Ward	2025	2026	First out trans person to serve on a city council in the state of Ohio. Childrey was appointed to the position in January 2025 but lost reelection in November of the same year.
Rien Finch	Democratic	Maine	Waterville City Council, 6th Ward	2023	2025	
Seven Siegel		Maine	Town Council, At-Large of Gorham	2022	present	
Alison Bowden		Oregon	City Council, Ward 6 of Corvallis	2025	present	
Ramona Thieme		Maine	Town Council, District 6 of Brunswick	2026	present	
Camden Hargrove		Wisconsin	Common Council, District 8 of Menomonie	2026	present	
Ramona Thieme		Maine	Town Council, District 6 of Brunswick	2026	present	
Robyn Kuslits		California	City Council, Concord (member-elect)	2026	present	First transgender member of a city council in the San Francisco Bay Area
Sabrina Bruce	Democratic	Virginia	Town Council and Vice Mayor, Herndon (member-elect)	2027	present	First transgender person elected to public office in Fairfax County
Camille Taylor		North Carolina	Town Commissioner, Powellsville, North Carolina	2025	present	First transgender person elected to public office in North Carolina
Ellie Varn		North Carolina	City Commissioner,Saluda, North Carolina	2026	present	First LGBT person elected to public office in Polk County, North Carolina, First transgender person elected in Western North Carolina

=== Local judicial ===
Name	Party	State	Office(s)	Start	End	Notes
Phyllis Frye	Democratic	Texas	Houston Municipal Court judge	2010	2023	The first openly trans person appointed as a judge in the U.S.

=== Local boards and commissions ===
Name	Party	Locality	Office(s)	Start	End	Notes
Amanda Simpson	Democratic	Tucson, Arizona	Commissioner of the Gay, Lesbian, Bisexual and Transgender Commission of Tucson	2001	c.2009	Later was elected or appointed to many different positions, including a precinct committee.
Theresa Sparks	Democratic	San Francisco, California	Chair of the LGBT Advisory Committee, San Francisco Human Rights Commission (Note: Appointed position)	2001	2004	Police commission president from 2007–2009.
Theresa Sparks	Democratic	San Francisco, California	Commissioner, San Francisco Police Commission	2004	2009	Police commission president from 2007–2009.
Jordan Willow Evans	Republican	Charlton, Massachusetts	Board of Trustees of the Public Library of Charlton	2016	2022	First openly trans Republican elected to office; elected in two different states. Goffstown library vice chair from 2025–present.
Jordan Willow Evans	Republican	Goffstown, New Hampshire	Board of Trustees of the Goffstown Public Library	2025	present	First openly trans Republican elected to office; elected in two different states. Goffstown library vice chair from 2025–present.
Jay Irwin		Ralston, Nebraska	School Board member	2016	2023	First openly trans man to be elected to office.
Gerri Cannon	Democratic	Somersworth, New Hampshire	School Board member	2017	2018	Currently serving in the New Hampshire House of Representatives.
Tyler Titus		Erie, Pennsylvania	School Board member	2017	2021	The first openly trans person elected in Pennsylvania. Currently serving on the Erie City Council.
Tyler Titus		Erie, Pennsylvania	School Board President	2020	2021	The first openly trans person elected in Pennsylvania. Currently serving on the Erie City Council.
Brandy Fortson		Corvallis, Oregon	Corvallis School District board member	2019	2022	First nonbinary person to hold office in Oregon.
Regina Roberts	Republican	Valley Center, California	Board of Directors of the Parks and Recreation District	2021	2021	Second known trans Republican elected to office and first openly trans Republican elected in California; elected to two simultaneous positions (the former office was dissolved into an advisory board, which she chaired in 2021); resigned to move to New Mexico.
Regina Roberts	Republican	Valley Center, California	Board of Directors of the Fire Protection District	2021	2024	Second known trans Republican elected to office and first openly trans Republican elected in California; elected to two simultaneous positions (the former office was dissolved into an advisory board, which she chaired in 2021); resigned to move to New Mexico.
Charlotte Clymer	Democratic	Washington, D.C.	Commissioner, Commission on Human Rights	2022	present	First trans appointee confirmed by District Council.
Alleria Stanley	Democratic	Frederick County, Maryland	Commissioner, Human Relations Commission	2025	present	First trans appointee confirmed by County Council.
Daniella Mendez	Democratic	Dover, New Jersey	Board of Education member	2022	2025	First trans woman elected to a Board of Education in New Jersey. President from 2023–2025.
Rebecca Blankenship	Democratic	Berea, Kentucky	School Board member	2023	2024	The first openly trans elected official in Kentucky.
Kina Chadwick		Bend and La Pine, Oregon	Bend-La Pine School District board member	2022	present	
Dion Manley	Independent	Franklin County, Ohio	Gahanna-Jefferson School Board member	2022	present	The first trans elected official in Ohio.
Precious Brady-Davis	Democratic	Chicago, Illinois	Member of the Metropolitan Water Reclamation District of Greater Chicago	2023	present	Appointed in July 2023 then elected by special election in 2024.
Rien Finch	Democratic	Waterville, Maine	Charter Commission Secretary	2019	2020	
River Khoriaty		Topsham, Maine	School Board member for School Administrative District 75	2023	2024	Elected November 2023 Moved out of the district in 2024.
Julia Lester		Oxford County, Maine	School Board member of Oxford Hills	2022	2023	Removed by recall election over their support for a proposal which aimed to foster a safe learning environment for students of all gender and sexual identities.
Judah Largent		Corvallis, Oregon	School Board member of Corvallis School District	2024	present	
Amy Heutmaker		Russell Township, Ohio	Board of Trustees member	2025	present	Second trans candidate in Ohio to win a local election
Monroe Lace		San Francisco, California	Commissioner, Human Rights Commission of San Francisco	2025	present	In November 2026, became first openly trans person elected to citywide office in San Francisco
Monroe Lace		San Francisco, California	San Francisco Community College District Board of Trustees (member-elect)	2027	present	In November 2026, became first openly trans person elected to citywide office in San Francisco
Taylor Brown	Democratic	New York City, New York	Director of the New York City Office of LGBTQIA+ Affairs	2026	present	First openly trans person to lead an NYC government office and the highest-ranking trans person to serve in NYC government
Quinnie Perez		Orange County, Florida	Soil and Water Conservation District supervisor	2027	present	The first trans woman to be elected in Florida

== Other elected positions ==
=== Neighborhood organizations ===
Name	Party	State	Office(s)	Start	End	Notes
Rachael Rose Luckey		California	Board member of the Rampart Village Neighborhood Council	2017	present	
Maebe A. Girl	Democratic	California	Member of the Silver Lake Neighborhood Council	2019	present	Girl is the first drag queen elected to public office in the United States. She is a three-time candidate for California's 30th congressional district and the first non-binary person to advance to a general election for a House seat. Girl is non-binary and uses she/her and they/them pronouns.
Monika Nemeth		Washington, D.C.	Commissioner, Advisory Neighborhood Commission, 3F06	2018	2023	First trans person to hold public office in Washington, D.C.
Hayden Gise		Washington, D.C.	Commissioner, Advisory Neighborhood Commission, 3C01	2022	2025	Second trans person to hold elected office in Washington, D.C.
Stephen Coleman Kenny		Washington, D.C.	Commissioner, Advisory Neighborhood Commission, 1A05	2022	2025	First nonbinary person to hold elected office in Washington, D.C.
Vida Rangel	Democratic	Washington, D.C.	Commissioner, Advisory Neighborhood Commission, 1A10	2027	present	First trans woman of color to win election to public office in D.C.
Dana White	Democratic	Washington, D.C.	Commissioner, Advisory Neighborhood Commission, 6B04	2027	present	First-known Black trans and nonbinary person elected to public office in D.C.

=== Party offices ===
Name	Party	State	Office(s)	Term	Notes
Traci Baker	Libertarian	Oklahoma	Secretary, Libertarian Party of Oklahoma	2018–2019	First trans person elected in Oklahoma. First openly trans person elected as a state-level executive for a recognized political party in the United States.
Kristen Browde	Democratic	Florida	Vice president, Florida Democratic Party LGBTQ+ Caucus	2023–present	
Laura Calvo	Democratic	Oregon	Democratic National Committee member	2013	
Émilia Decaudin	Democratic	New York	Democratic District Leader, 37th State Assembly District	2020–present	With Melissa Sklarz, first openly trans district leaders in New York State. First trans member of the New York State Democratic Committee.
Émilia Decaudin	Democratic	New York	New York State Democratic Committee member	2018–2020	With Melissa Sklarz, first openly trans district leaders in New York State. First trans member of the New York State Democratic Committee.
Honey Mahogany	Democratic	California	3rd Vice Chair, San Francisco Democratic County Central Committee, 17th District	2020	First Black trans person elected in California
Michelle Risher	Democratic	Oregon	Chair, Democratic Party of Oregon (DPO)'s Stonewall (LGBTQ+) Caucus	2017–2019	She is the first trans person elected as a first, senior, or second vice-chair of a state or territorial Democratic party, and the first to be next in the line of succession to the party chair.
Michelle Risher	Democratic	Oregon	Vice-chair, DPO	2019	She is the first trans person elected as a first, senior, or second vice-chair of a state or territorial Democratic party, and the first to be next in the line of succession to the party chair.
Barbra Casbar Siperstein	Democratic	New Jersey	Democratic National Committee member	2009–2017	
Melissa Sklarz	Democratic	New York	Democratic District Leader, 30th State Assembly District	2020–present	With Émilia Decaudin, first openly trans district leaders in New York State
Boudicca Walsh	Democratic	Washington	Chair, Thurston County Democrats	2017	
Brianna Westbrook	Democratic	Arizona	Vice-chair, Democratic Party of Arizona	2019–present	She is the first trans person elected a vice-chair of a state Democratic Party.
Venn Sage Wylde	Democratic	Oregon	Precinct Committee member, Multnomah County	2003 (overall committee membership); 2018 (as a "committeeperson")	They are nonbinary. Following their filing, the County Elections Director determined that the county would add a third column for "committeeperson" to the year's primary ballot, which previously only had space for "committeeman" and "committeewoman."

== See also ==
- List of first openly LGBT politicians in the United States
- List of LGBT politicians in the United States
- List of transgender political office-holders
- List of non-binary political office-holders
- Rainbow wave
