= Bentley Hudgins =

American politician and activist

Member-elect of the Georgia House of Representatives from the 90th district
- Assuming office January 11, 2027
- Succeeding: Saira Draper

Personal details
- Born: 1993 or 1994 (age 32–33) Georgia
- Party: Democratic
- Education: Mercer University (BA)
- Website: bentleyhudgins.com

Bentley Hudgins is an American activist, organizer, and politician. They are the member-elect for Georgia's 90th House of Representatives district in the 2026 cycle, which they were previously a candidate for in 2022. A Democratic Socialist, they are the first Japanese American and first openly transgender lawmaker elected to statewide office in Georgia, as well as the first openly nonbinary lawmaker elected to a state legislature in the Deep South.

== Early life and education ==
Hudgins grew up in Georgia, near a Christmas tree farm. They have discussed struggles they faced in their youth, including brown water, sleeping in a pickup truck after losing housing, and hearing loss that took years to repair. They graduated from Union Grove High School in 2011. Hudgins studied philosophy at Mercer University, in Macon, Georgia, where they were in student government. Hudgins has recounted being sexually assaulted and drugged during college. This caused them to temporarily withdraw from college, and during that time they organized a vigil for the victims of the Pulse nightclub shooting in 2016. In 2017 they campaigned in an effort to protect public-sector employees in Macon-Bibb County from being discriminated against. They graduated from college that same year with a degree in philosophy.

== Career ==
Following college, Hudgins went on to work at the ACLU, the Georgia AFL-CIO, the Georgia Budget & Policy Institute, and the New Georgia Project. They organized against gun violence.

Hudgins first ran for Georgia's 90th House of Representatives district in 2022 to succeed Bee Nguyen. They received endorsements from Fair Fight Action, the Working Families Party, and Georgia Equality. They campaigned using drag, and also knocked thousands of doors. They came in third in the primary: Saira Draper went on to win. Between 2023 and 2026, they worked as the Georgia State Director for Human Rights Campaign. During this time, they campaigned against anti-LGBTQ bills.

In 2026, Hudgins ran for Georgia's 90th House of Representatives district once again, to succeed Draper. This time, they won the primary against fellow Democrat Leisa Stafford. Prior to the general, they began setting up constituent services including organizing calls and an interfaith commission. Among their campaign priorities were a data center moratorium and Medicaid expansion. They also emphasized affordability, housing, transit, and water. Hudgins won in the election on November 3, 2026, becoming member-elect. They are the first Japanese American and first openly transgender lawmaker elected to statewide office in Georgia, as well as the first openly nonbinary lawmaker elected to a state legislature in the Deep South.

Hudgins received the Local Community Builder Award from Georgia Equality. In 2026, they were included in the Out magazine Out100.

== Personal life ==
Hudgins resides in Longdale Park, Georgia, with their fiancé Robert, who they married in November 2026. Hudgins was diagnosed as deaf at 19 and had their hearing restored.
