= Rainbow wave =

Rise in number of American LGBTQ+ candidates for office beginning in 2018

The "rainbow wave" was a phrase coined in 2018 to describe the unparalleled number of openly LGBTQ+ candidates running for political office in the United States that year. The rainbow wave began during the 2018 U.S. midterm elections when over 400 LGBTQ+ candidates ran for office and a record-breaking 244 were elected.

The following year, in the 2019 elections, 382 openly LGBTQ+ candidates ran for public office and 200 made it on the ballot, of which 170 won. In the 2020 elections, over 1,000 LGBTQ+ people ran for office and 734 LGBTQ+ candidates secured a spot on the ballot. Of these candidates, 334 won. The 2021 elections had the largest number of LGBTQ+ candidates in any U.S. off-year election; there were 430 LGBTQ+ candidates, of which 184 were elected.

The 2022 elections represented the biggest rainbow wave in U.S. history, as 1,065 LGBTQ+ candidates ran for office and 436 were elected. The 2022 U.S. elections were also the first time that LGBTQ+ candidates appeared on the ballot across all 50 states and the District of Columbia.

Lesbian and gay issues have been specially considered in United States elections since 1974, when the first two openly gay politicians were elected, Kathy Kozachenko and Elaine Noble, and the first anti-homosexual measure appeared on the ballot in Colorado. During the 1970s through to the 2010s, LGBTQ+ political considerations and advances shifted and expanded. In the late 1990s through the 2000s, there was a focus on gay marriage. The 2015 Supreme Court case Obergefell v. Hodges solidified the constitutional right to same-sex marriage. Starting from the mid-2010s and continuing through the present day, there has been a focus on transgender rights and discrimination.

As of 2023, there are 1,175 openly-LGBTQ+ elected officials in the United States, more than ever before.

There is little research on voter attitudes towards and the impacts of LGBTQ+ candidates. One study found that voters significantly penalize lesbian, gay, and transgender candidates, with transgender candidates facing a significantly higher penalty than their lesbian and gay counterparts. The level of voter scrutiny against these candidates varied by partisanship, political ideology, religion, and voters' relationships with LGBT people, or lack thereof. The study attributed these biases most significantly to the worry of their "electability," along with outright prejudice and the worry that the candidates were too liberal. Regarding the impacts of these candidates, LGBTQ+ representation in political office has been found to correlate strongly with the proposal and passage of pro-LGBTQ and equal rights legislation. It has also been found to positively influence societal perceptions of the LGBTQ+ community and their equal rights at large.

== History of LGBTQ+ politics and representation in office ==
=== Overview of LGBTQ+ politics (1970s–present) ===
Lesbian and gay issues were first given special consideration in the 1974 United States elections. During this cycle, alongside the election of the first two openly gay politicians, the first anti-homosexual measure was put on a ballot. The measure was passed in Colorado through referendum, removing sexual orientation as a protected category from discrimination in Boulder's Human Rights Ordinance. In the following 30 years, there were many similar anti-gay initiatives promoted by the religious right. At the same time, there were nearly 150 state and local initiatives and referendums for gay civil rights.

Overall, LGBTQ+ political advances spanned and shifted focus from the 1970s through the 2010s. In the 1970s, LGBTQ+ political considerations focused on adding sexual orientation as a protected category to anti-discrimination ordinances. These measures faced backlash initiatives and referendums from the religious right. The 1970s also centered on protecting gay teachers in schools with varying levels of success.

In the 1980s and 1990s, the anti-LGBTQ+ movement intensified, most prominently through proposed amendments that would repeal and ban the anti-discrimination ordinances protecting lesbian, gay and bisexual people. Ultimately, however, the 1996 Supreme Court case Romer v. Evans ruled these amendments unconstitutional on the grounds of not satisfying the Equal Protection Clause of the Fourteenth Amendment.

In the late 1990s through the 2000s, pro-LGBTQ and anti-LGBTQ movements focused on same-sex unions and marriages. During this time, bans on same-sex marriage spread throughout the United States. The year 2012 marked a shift in these anti-gay marriage attitudes, when the first states (Maine, Maryland, and Washington) legalized same-sex marriage through popular vote. In 2015, the U.S. Supreme Court Case Obergefell v. Hodges effectively legalized marriage equality nationwide on the grounds of the Due Process Clause and the Equal Protection Clause of the Fourteenth Amendment.

In the mid-2010s, transgender rights and discrimination (in employment, housing, and other sectors) became the focus of both the religious right and pro-LGBTQ+ movement. As of 2023, Republicans are proposing and supporting hundreds of pieces of anti-LGBTQ+ legislation across the country. According to the ACLU, there are over 450 anti-LGBTQ+ bills in the United States for the 2023 legislative session, targeting issues such as gender-affirming healthcare, gender identity and sexuality in public school education. A PBS News Hour, NPR, and Marist Poll showed increasing support for these anti-LGBTQ+ laws. For example, since 2021, there has been a 15% increase (from 28% to 43% of Americans) in support of laws banning gender-affirming medical care for minors.

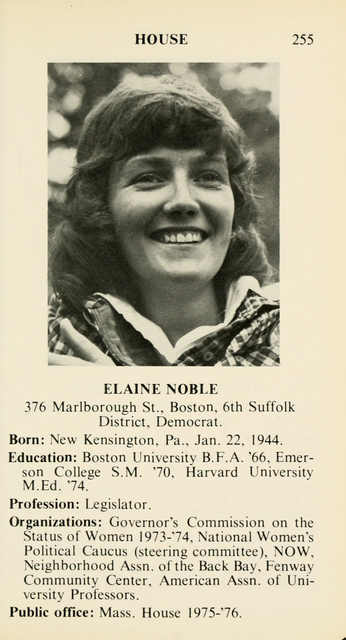
Portrait and description of Elaine Noble, Massachusetts House representative for District 6

=== First openly LGBTQ+ candidates and elects ===
Drag queen and activist José Sarria became the first openly gay person to run for public office in the United States when he ran for the San Francisco Board of Supervisors in 1961. Kathy Kozachenko was elected to the Ann Arbor, Michigan City Council in 1974, becoming the first openly gay and lesbian politician in the United States. Shortly after, also in 1974, Elaine Noble became the first openly gay person elected to a state legislature, when she was elected to the Massachusetts General Assembly as a representative for Boston's Back Bay neighborhood.

In 1977, pioneering gay rights activist Harvey Milk became one of the first openly LGBTQ+ elected politicians in the United States and the first LGBTQ+ politician in California when he was elected to the San Francisco Board of Supervisors. Gerry Studds became the first openly-LGBTQ+ Member of the U.S. Congress when he came out while in office in 1983. After coming out, he was reelected in 1984. Since these and other LGBTQ+ individuals became the frontrunners of LGBTQ+ representation in politics, hundreds of openly LGBTQ+ individuals have run and been elected to public office in the United States.

Transgender representation has moved more slowly. Since at least the 1990s, transgender candidates have run for office, but often not openly. In 2012, Stacie-Marie Laughton became the first openly transgender lawmaker elected in the United States when she was elected to the New Hampshire House of Representatives, but resigned before taking office. Danica Roem ultimately became the first openly-transgender state legislator when she was elected to the Virginia House of Delegates in 2017.

== Current representation of LGBTQ+ people in political office ==
There are currently more openly-LGBTQ+ elected officials in local, state, and national legislatures than ever before. As of April 2, 2023, there are 1,175 openly-LGBTQ+ elected officials in the United States, an increase from 698 five years ago. Of all elected officials nationwide, 0.23% are openly LGBTQ+. There are 13 openly-LGBTQ+ members of the United States Congress compared to 10 in 2019. There are 228 openly-LGBTQ+ state legislators, an increase of 55% since 2019, and 721 local LGBTQ+ officials, an increase of 83% since 2019. There are three governors, 59 mayors, and 137 officials at the judicial level who are openly-LGBTQ+. Of the 1,175 openly LGBTQ+ elected officials, 887 (75%) are Democrats, 34 are Republicans (3%), 28 are independent (2%), and 58 are from another party (5%).

The composition of LGBTQ+ elected officials is also increasingly more diverse. Racially, the number of LGBTQ+ politicians of color has increased from 22% of all LGBTQ+ elected officials in 2019 to 32% in 2023, including a 186% increase in Black/African-American/Afro-Caribbean and a 116% increase in Latinx/Hispanic LGBTQ+ politicians since 2019. LGBTQ+ female elected officials saw a 60% increase, non-binary and gender non-confirming people a 300% increase, trans women a 173% increase, and trans men an 80% increase since 2019. Since 2019, queer, bisexual, and pansexual candidates have also increased by 200%.

== Voter attitudes and electoral barriers for LGBTQ+ candidates ==
There has been little formal research on voter attitudes towards LGBTQ+ candidates.

A 2021 study by political scientists Gabriele Magni and Andrew Reynolds investigated voter attitudes towards a candidate based on their sexual orientation and gender identity in advanced democracies. They found that the United States had the greatest voter penalties towards LGBT candidates of the three countries investigated (US, UK, and New Zealand). The researchers conducted surveys through a conjoint experiment of over 1,800 Americans to measure their attitudes toward candidate characteristics in a hypothetical election.

Overall, gay and lesbian candidates face a 6.7 percentage point penalty compared to their heterosexual counterparts while transgender candidates face an 11 percentage point penalty. The study also found that LGBTQ+ candidates of ethnic minorities face no further penalty, other than Black gay candidates who face an additional 3.6 percentage point penalty for their sexual orientation. Additionally, voters favor candidates with more political experience, which the researchers say disadvantages LGBTQ+ candidates because they are less likely to have this experience.

The study found that there is a wide variation in attitudes towards LGBT candidates based on different voter demographics. Partisanship was a clear indicator, as the penalty for gay candidates between Republican and Democratic voters differed by 8.4 percentage points. Republicans significantly penalized gay candidates by 14.8 percentage points.

Political ideology represents a stronger indicator of voter attitudes, as progressives did not penalize gay or lesbian candidates at all, while conservatives strongly penalized them by 17.2 percentage points. Moreover, people with LGBT family members or friends did not penalize gay candidates, and LGBT voters favor gay candidates by nine or 10 percentage points.

Nonreligious voters did not penalize gay candidates, but religious ones (those who regularly attended religious services) significantly penalized them by 12 percentage points.

Transgender candidates were more strongly penalized across all of the voter subgroups. The differences between the subgroups were less distinct for transgender candidates. Progressives and LGBT voters represent the only groups who did not penalize transgender candidates and even sometimes favored them, while conservatives significantly penalized them by 16 to 18 percentage points. Democrats penalized transgender candidates by six percentage points, while Republicans penalized them by 19 percentage points. Voters with LGBT friends and family penalized transgender candidates by five percentage points. Religious voters penalize transgender candidates by the highest margin (18 percentage points).

The study also looked at the reasons for these voter biases. They explained that the primary biases were explained by outright prejudice, electability, and perceptions of the candidates as liberal. The most prominent explanation for bias against gay and transgender candidates was the worry of electability, accounting for 52% and 57% of the voters' justifications for gay and transgender candidates respectively. Outright prejudice was responsible for 32% of the effects of voter bias, while perceptions of gay and transgender candidates as more liberal accounted for 9% of the concerns about gay candidates, and 6% for transgender candidates.

== Rainbow waves (2018–2023) ==
=== 2018 election rainbow wave ===
The term "rainbow wave" was coined in the 2018 midterms, as a result of the unprecedented number of candidates and elects. During this cycle, there were over 600 openly LGBTQ+ candidates running for office, 432 on the ballot, and 244 winners. Twenty-two openly LGBTQ+ candidates ran for party seats in Congress, representing an increase of 340% since 2010. Close to 195 candidates ran for state legislatures across 43 states. Moreover, a record number of transgender women ran for office, including Democrat Christine Hallquist, the first transgender person to become a majority party's nominee for governor.

Of the 432 LGBTQ+ candidates on the ballot, 10 of 28 federal candidates were elected, and 26 of the 34 judicial candidates were elected. In the state legislature, 110 of 197 LGBTQ+ candidates were elected, while statewide, six of 11 were elected. On the local level, 80 of 142 candidates were elected and 10 of 16 LGBTQ+ mayoral candidates were elected.

Prior to the 2018 election, there were seven openly LGBTQ+ congresspeople (six House representatives and one senator), which increased to 10 after the election (eight House representatives and two senators). Additionally, in 2018, there were 119 openly LGBTQ+ state legislators, increasing to 148 after the election. Pre-election, seven states had never elected an LGBTQ+ candidate to their state legislatures, which decreased to four, as Indiana and Nebraska each elected their first LGBTQ+ state legislative member. Additionally, four LGBTQ+ candidates ran for governor, two of which won.

==== Notable 2018 LGBTQ+ elected officials ====
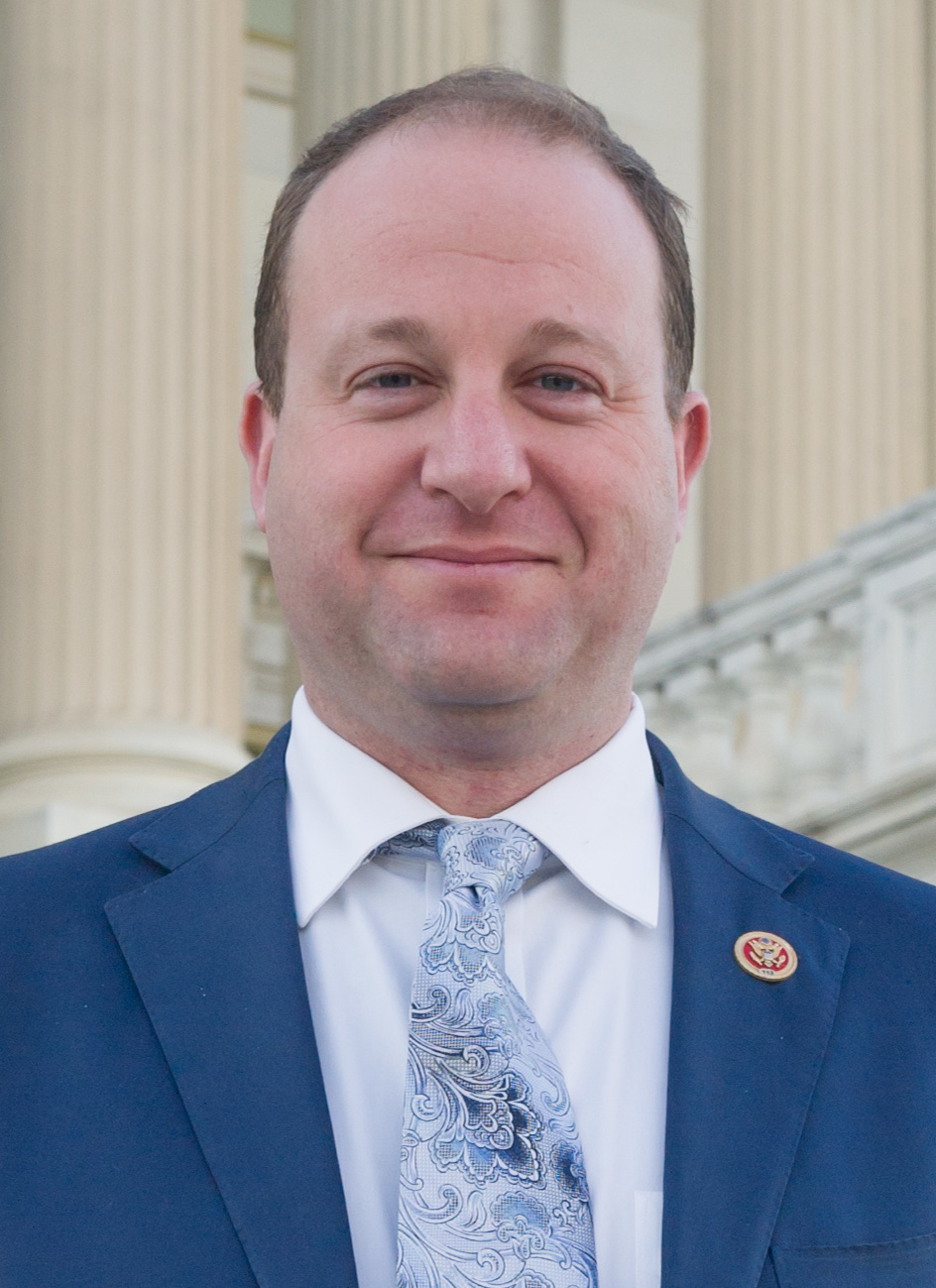
Governor Jared Polis' official portrait from when he was a House representative for Colorado's 2nd congressional district

- Kyrsten Sinema (D) was elected as a senator for Arizona, becoming the first openly bisexual person to be a United States senator and the first female Arizona senator.
- Jared Polis (D), formerly a five-term democratic representative from Colorado, became the first openly gay man to become governor in the United States when he was elected the governor of Colorado.
- Sharice Davids (D) was elected Democratic representative of Kansas' third congressional district, becoming Congress' first lesbian Native American and first Native American woman member.
- Chris Pappas (D) was elected as House representative for New Hampshire's first congressional district, becoming the state's first openly gay member of Congress.
- Angie Craig (D), elected as House representative of Minnesota's second congressional district, became the state's first openly LGBTQ+ congressperson.
- Malcolm Kenyatta (D) was elected to Pennsylvania's statehouse, becoming the first openly gay person of color to hold such a seat in the state.
- Kate Brown (D), who became the first openly bisexual governor in 2015, was reelected as Oregon's governor.
- Tammy Baldwin (D), the first openly LGBTQ+ senator, was reelected as a senator representing Wisconsin.
- Sean Patrick Maloney (D), New York's first openly gay congressperson, was reelected as House representative for the state's 18th congressional district.

=== 2019 election rainbow wave ===
In 2019, of 382 openly LGBTQ+ candidates, 200 candidates were on the ballot and 170 won their races. LGBTQ Victory Fund data from November 6, 2019, found that of these 382 candidates, 40% were from states that ranked at low or negative equality levels, of which 35.5% won. About 83% of the LGBTQ+ candidates were Democrats with a 40.3% success rate, while 2.4% were Republican with a 33.3% success rate. The Victory Fund endorsed 178 candidates of which 117 won: five in state legislatures, nine mayors, 102 local officials, and one judicial elect.

The 2019 LGBTQ+ candidate pool represented 29.1% people of color, of which 34.2% won. Transgender women had the highest win rate, as 56.3% (nine) of the 16 transgender female candidates won. None of the three transgender male candidates won their races, while one of the three gender non-conforming, and two of the five non-binary candidates won. Thirty-eight percent (78) of the 205 gay candidates, 44.6% (33) of the 73 lesbian candidates, 41.7% (10) of the 24 bisexual candidates, and 40% (10) of the 25 queer candidates, were elected. Among other progressions in LGBTQ+ representation in 2019, the number of lesbian mayors in major cities doubled, as three were elected (in Chicago, Illinois; Tampa, Florida; and Madison, Wisconsin).

==== Notable 2019 LGBTQ+ elected officials ====
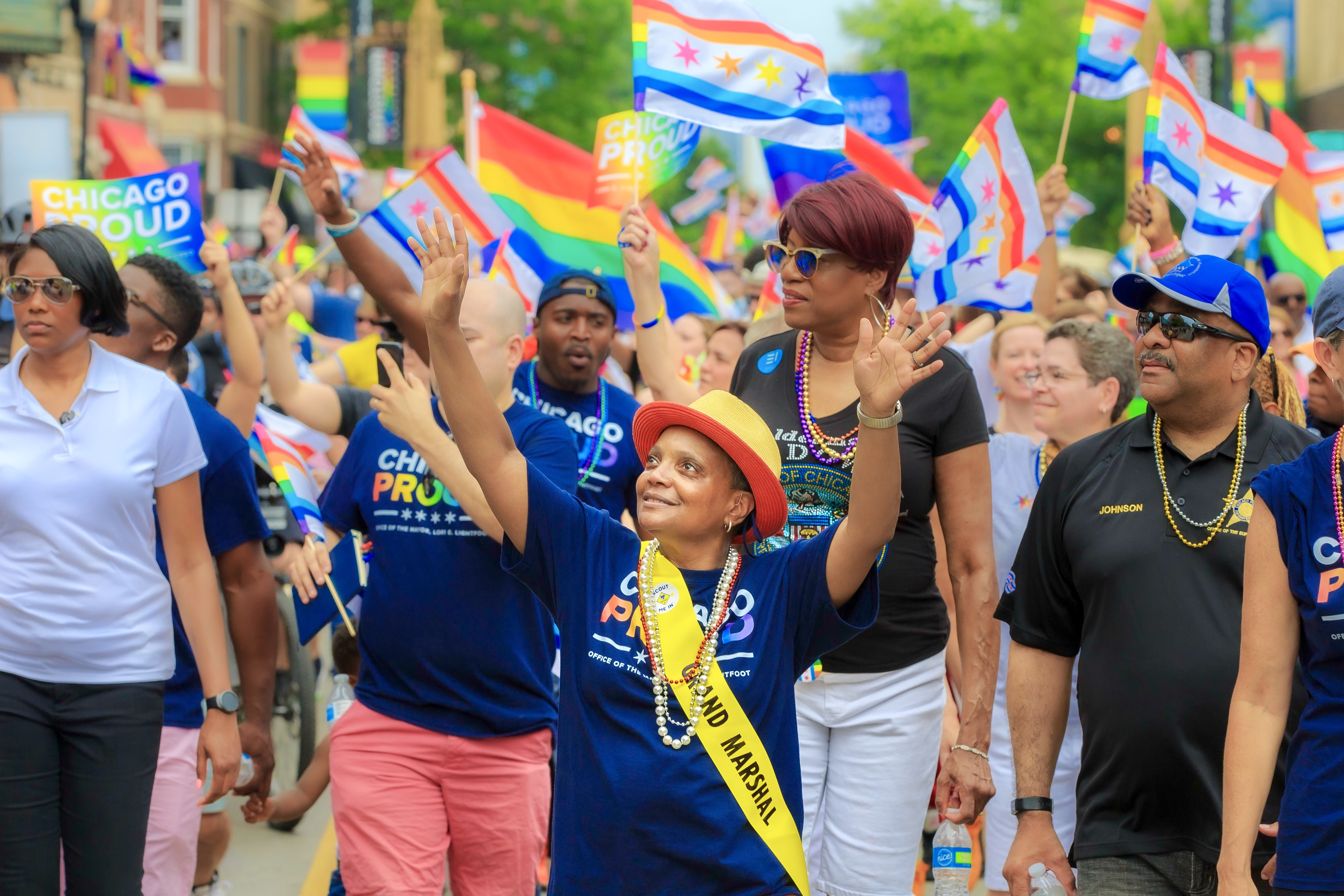
Mayor of Chicago Lori Lightfoot (center) in the 2019 Chicago Pride Parade

- Danica Roem (D), elected in 2017 as the first openly transgender official in statewide office, was reelected as House delegate for Virginia's 13th District.
- Lori Lightfoot (D) became the "highest-ranking LGBTQ+ mayor" in United States history, as she was elected the mayor of Chicago with 73% of the vote, and was one of the two overall top-ranking mayoral elects (of 12) in the election. Her election made Chicago the largest city to ever elect an openly gay mayor and a Black female mayor.
- N.J. Akbar (D) was elected to the Akron, Ohio Board of Education, becoming one of the first gay, Black, and Muslim people in United States public office.

=== 2020 election rainbow wave ===
In the 2020 midterm election, 1,006 openly LGBTQ+ candidates ran for political office and 782 were on the general election ballot, of which 334 won. This represented a 42.7% success rate. The election also showed a 41% increase in LGBTQ+ candidates from 2018. The 2020 midterms had more LGBTQ+ candidates and LGBTQ+ elects than any other United States election prior.

According to a Victory Fund report, of the 782 candidates on the ballot, there were 63 federal candidates and nine elects, 10 statewide candidates and zero elects, 327 state legislative candidates and 139 elects, 37 judicial candidates and 21 elects, 20 mayoral candidates and five elects, and 325 local candidates and 160 elects.

The 2020 LGBTQ+ candidate pool had 35.7% people of color, 37.1% of which won their seats. There were six transgender men, 38 transgender women, four gender nonconforming, and 13 genderqueer/nonbinary candidates. Nearly 37% of the transgender candidates were elected. Gay candidates represented the largest portion of the candidate pool with 391 candidates and a 41.5% success rate. Lesbian candidates had the highest success rate, with 172 candidates and 55.2% elects. One-third of the 72 bisexual candidates, 35% of the 17 pansexual candidates, 40% of the 55 queer candidates, and none of the two asexual candidates won.

More LGBTQ+ candidates won seats in Congress than any other year, with nine LGBTQ+ congressional elects, including all of the seven incumbents up for election. After the election, the 117th Congress had nine openly LGBTQ+ House representatives and two senators. Moreover, before 2020, there were four transgender state representatives, and after the election, there were nine. Among transgender, nonbinary, and gender-nonconforming state candidates, eight were elected. Moreover, Delaware and Tennessee elected their first LGBTQ+ state senators: State Senators Sarah McBride and Marie Pinkney in Delaware, and State Representative Eric Morrison in Delaware; and State Representatives Torrey Harris and Eddie Mannis in Tennessee.

==== Notable 2020 LGBTQ+ elected officials ====
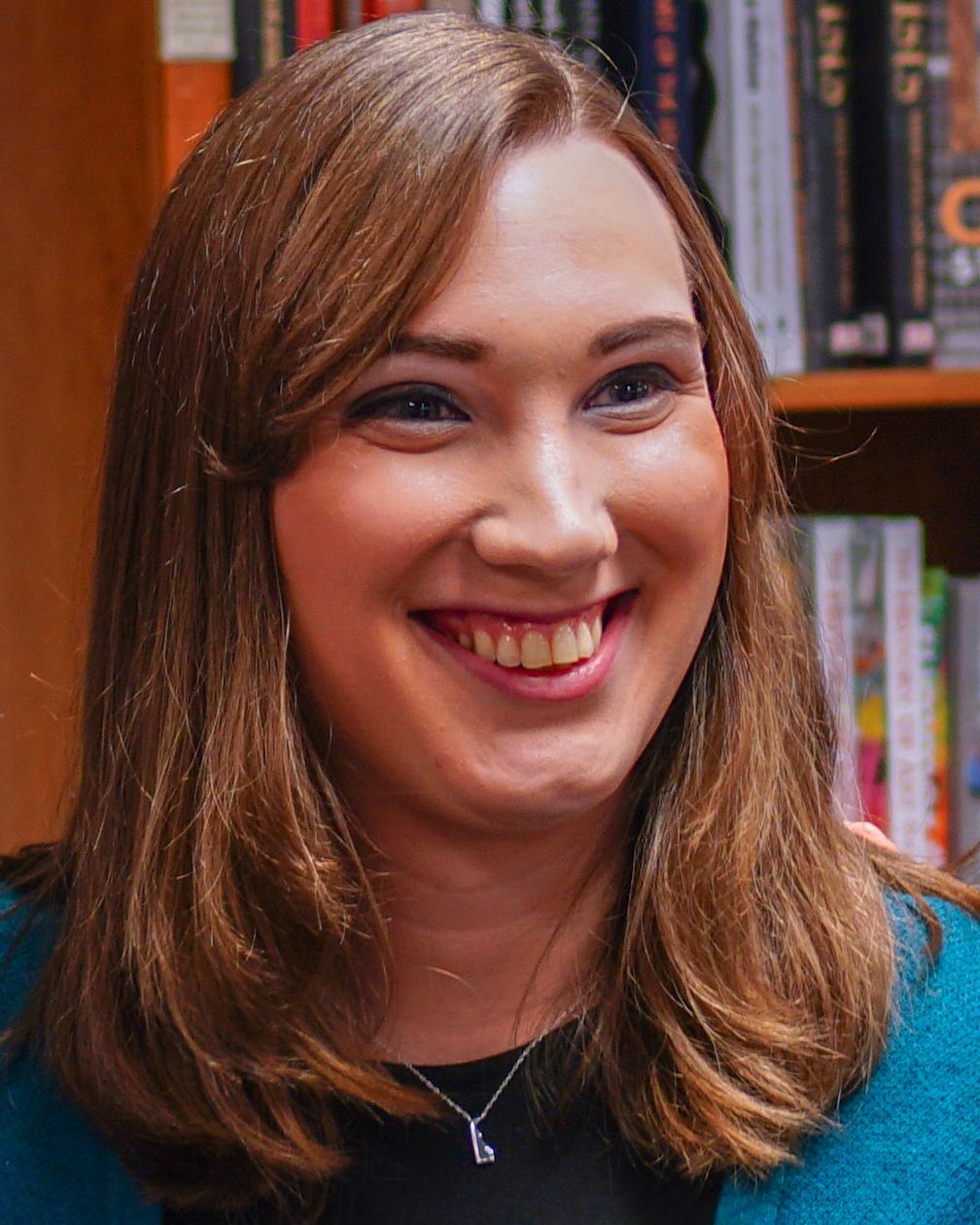
Sarah McBride from an event in 2018

- Sarah McBride (D) was elected as a Delaware state senator, becoming the first openly transgender state senator in United States history and the United States' highest-ranking transgender official.
- Kim Jackson (D) was elected to the Georgia State Senate, becoming the state's first LGBTQ+ senator and one of three of the United States' LGBTQ+ Black female state senators.
- Stephanie Byers (D) was elected as the Kansas House representative for District 86, becoming the first transgender state lawmaker of color in U.S. history and Kansas' first transgender statewide official.
- Mauree Turner (D) became the first non-binary lawmaker in the United States and the first practicing Muslim in the Oklahoma legislature, as they were elected as the Oklahoma House representative for District 88.
- Joshua Query (D) was originally elected to the New Hampshire State House of Representatives District Hillsborough 39 in 2018 and came out as gender nonconforming during their term. They were reelected in 2020, becoming the first gender-nonconforming state legislator.
- Ritchie Torres (D) became the first Black and Latinx LGBTQ+ congressperson and one of two of the first Black LGBTQ+ congresspeople when he was elected as the House representative of New York's 15th Congressional District.
- Mondaire Jones (D) became one of two of the first Black LGBTQ+ congresspeople when he was elected to the House of Representatives for New York's 17th Congressional District.
- Todd Gloria (D) was elected mayor of San Diego, California, becoming their first LGBTQ+ mayor and first mayor of color.
- Pete Buttigieg (D), the United States' first openly gay major presidential candidate, won Iowa's presidential primary election, becoming the first openly gay person to win a state primary.

=== 2021 election rainbow wave ===
In the 2021 rainbow wave, 430 openly LGBTQ+ candidates ran for public office of which 237 made the ballot and 184 won. According to the Victory Fund's November 16, 2021 report, the 2021 United States elections represented an 18.5% increase in candidacy from 2019 and more LGBTQ+ candidates won than any other odd-numbered election in United States history. Moreover, it brought the total number of LGBTQ+ elected officials from 995 to 1038, marking the first time this number exceeded 1000 LGBTQ+ individuals. Overall, the LGBTQ+ candidates in the 2021 elections had a 46% success rate.

Of the 430 openly LGBTQ+ candidates, there were three federal candidates and zero elects, three statewide candidates and zero elects, 20 state legislative candidates and six elects, seven judicial candidates and five elects, 41 mayoral candidates and 16 elects, and 356 local candidates and 157 elects. Of the 430 candidates, 37% were people of color, a five percent increase from 2019. This proportion represented the most racially diverse LGBTQ+ candidate pool in United States history and a significantly higher percentage of candidates of color than the general election pool. The LGBTQ+ candidates of color in this election had a 37% success rate.

Of all of the sexual orientations, gay male candidates represented the highest number of candidates, with 192 candidates winning at a rate of 49.4%. Lesbian candidates had the highest success rate of any other sexual orientation, as 60% of the 60 candidates were elected. However, there was a 7.3% decrease in gay male candidacy and a 19% decrease in lesbian candidacy from 2019. Forty-five percent of the 41 bisexual and 23.1% of the 13 pansexual candidates were elected. Additionally, transgender women had the highest win rate of any other gender identity, with 63.2% of the 21 transgender women candidates elected. More nonbinary and queer people ran for office than ever before, with 27.8% of 19 nonbinary candidates and 34.6% of 59 queer candidates winning their elections.

==== Notable 2021 elected officials ====
- Xander Orenstein (D) was elected to the Allegheny County Magisterial District Court in Pennsylvania, becoming the first nonbinary judicial elected official.
- Don Guardian (R) was elected to the New Jersey General Assembly, which previously had no LGBTQ+ legislators, as the first Republican LGBTQ+ state lawmaker.
- Jalen McKee-Rodriguez (Nonpartisan) was elected as a representative for District 2 of the San Antonio City Council, becoming the first Black gay man elected to office in Texas.
- Kristin Richardson Jordan (D), elected to represent New York's 9th District, and Crystal Hudson elected to represent District 35, became the first two Black LGBTQ+ women on the New York City council.
- Dion Manley (Nonpartisan) became the first transgender elected official in Ohio when he was elected to the Gahanna Jefferson School Board.

=== 2022 election rainbow wave ===
The 2022 midterm elections became the biggest rainbow wave in United States history with an unprecedented 1,065 overall candidates, a 5.9% increase from the 2020 elections. Out of these candidates, 714 secured a spot on the ballot and 436 won, representing a 61% success rate. For the first time, there were LGBTQ+ candidates on the ballot in every state and the District of Columbia.

Congress now has the most lesbian, gay, and bisexual members in United States history. Prior to the 2022 midterms, there were nine House representatives and two senators, and after, there were 11 House representatives and two senators. Of the 11 House representatives, seven are incumbents and four are new elects.

The 2022 midterms represented the most diverse LGBTQ+ candidate pool of any election, with 38.2% candidates of color, a 7.3% increase from the 2020 election and a 9.5% increase from the 2018 midterms. For the first time, more Black LGBTQ+ candidates than Latinx LGBTQ+ candidates ran for office.

An unprecedented number of non-cisgender candidates ran for office, representing 13.9% of the overall candidate pool, a 6% increase from 2020 and a 4.8% increase from 2018. The number of nonbinary candidates more than tripled since 2020 with 54 nonbinary candidates in the 2022 election, in contrast to 17 in 2020 and four in 2018. Eighteen of the 37 transgender candidates won, making a 49% success rate, and 13 of the 24 nonbinary candidates won, making a 54% success rate.

Gay men represented the largest portion of the candidacy, representing 55% of the candidate pool, paralleling trends from other elections. Queer-identifying candidates grew from 4.3% of the candidacy in 2018 and 6.8% of the candidacy in 2020, to 11.2% of candidates in 2022. Additionally, 18.2% of the candidates were lesbian and 11.2% were bisexual.

==== Notable LGBTQ+ elected officials ====
- Maura Healey (D), former Massachusetts' attorney general, was elected as the state's governor, becoming one of two of the United States' first lesbian governors.
- Tina Kotek (D), previously the United States' first lesbian speaker of a state House, was elected as Oregon's governor, becoming one of two of the first lesbian governors in United States history.
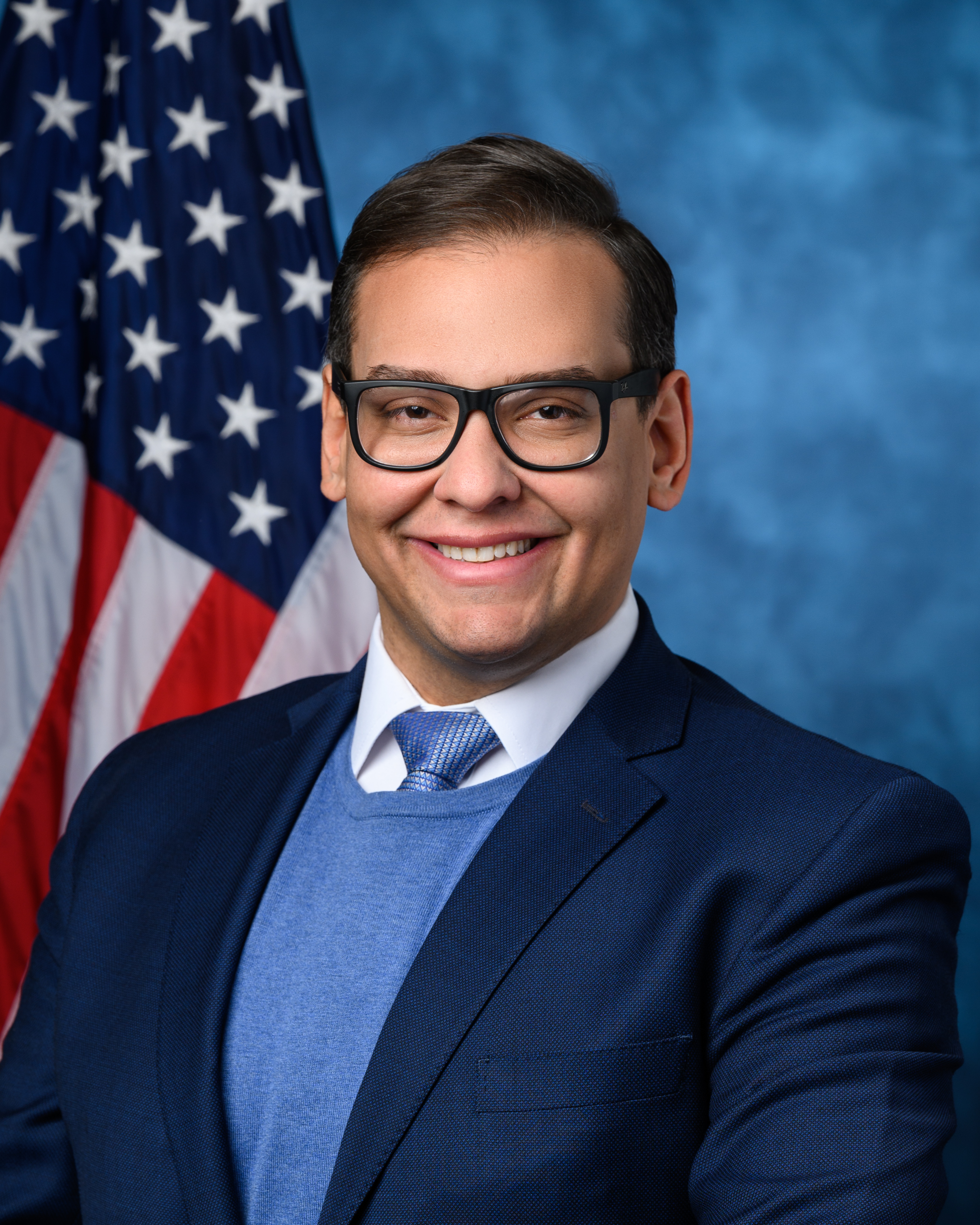
- Office portrait of House Representative George Santos
  George Santos (R) was elected as House representative of New York's 3rd congressional district, becoming the first openly gay Republican congressperson. His election was also the first general election in which two major party nominees were LGBTQ+ and opposed one another.
- Erick Russell (D) became the first Black LGBTQ+ person elected to statewide office in the United States when he was elected as the Connecticut state Treasurer.
- James Roesener (D) was elected as representative of the 22nd District of the New Hampshire State House, becoming the first openly transgender man elected to a state legislature in the United States.
- Leigh Finke (DFL) was elected as Minnesota state House representative of their 66A congressional district, becoming the first transgender legislator of the Minnesota House.
- Zooey Zephyr (D) became the first transgender state legislator in Montana when she was elected to the Montana House's 100th congressional district.
- SJ Howell (D) became the first nonbinary state legislator in Montana when they were elected to the Montana House's 95th congressional district.
- Jennie Armstrong (D), elected to represent Alaska's 16th state House District, and Andrew Gray, elected to represent Alaska's 20th state House District, became the first LGBTQ+ state legislators in Alaska. Previous to the election, Alaska was one of four states with no LGBTQ+ lawmakers.
- Eric Sorensen (D) became the first LGBTQ+ congressperson from Illinois when he was elected to the House of Representatives for District 17 of Illinois.
- Becca Balint (D) was elected to the House of Representatives to represent Vermont's first congressional district, becoming the state's first openly gay and first woman to be elected to Congress.

== Impacts of LGBTQ+ political representation ==
There is little modern and well-developed research on the legislative impacts of LGBTQ+ elected officials.

A 2013 study by Andrew Reynolds investigated the effect of lesbian, gay, bisexual, and transgender elected officials on equal rights legislation regarding sexual orientation across 96 countries, not including the United States. Of the 96 countries, 27 had elected LGBT members of parliament. Overall, the study found that even a small increase in the number of openly LGBT elected politicians is strongly linked to an increase in positive gay rights legislation. It found that even one LGBT elected official positively influences gay rights laws.

The study posited that this positive correlation between LGBT legislators and positive LGBT rights legislation is a result of the legislators changing the attitudes of their fellow (non-LGBT) politicians and the attitudes of the electorate. LGBT legislators form alliances with heterosexual colleagues, where they educate their political counterparts and help them set positive LGBT policy agendas. The public representation of LGBT individuals in elected office also positively influences overall societal views on LGBT people and on equal rights.

The study explained the election of LGBT members of parliament as a virtuous cycle. Societies that are already more open-minded towards LGBT people are more likely to have LGBT legislators. When LGBT legislators are elected, they positively influence societal beliefs about LGBT people, which in turn further increases their representation in office.

A 2007 study by Donald Haider-Markel similarly examined the effect of LGBT elected officials on pro and anti-LGBT legislation in the United States between 1992 and 2002. At the time of the study, 68 LGBT politicians had been elected to U.S. public office since 1974. It found that as there was an increase in LGBT elected legislators, there was also an increase in pro-LGBT bills and significant anti-discrimination policies that were introduced and passed.

The study found that the election of LGBT legislators also prompts backlash; as the number of LGBT legislators increased, there was also an increase in anti-LGBT legislation introduced and passed. However, the study analyzed the positive and negative impacts of this representation and found that an increase in LGBT legislators had a net positive impact on LGBT legislation.

A 1996 study by Kenneth Wald, James Button, and Barbara Rienzo found that the presence of openly gay candidates for public office in U.S. cities and counties increased the likelihood that the locality adopted and maintained a local gay rights and anti-discrimination ordinance.

== See also ==
- List of political slogans
