= 2024 Wheeling, West Virginia municipal election =

The 2024 Wheeling, West Virginia municipal election was held on May 14, 2024, to elect members of the city council and mayor. The elections were held under the first-past-the-post system.

== Mayor ==
Incumbent mayor Glenn Elliott, first elected in 2016 and reelected in 2020, was term-limited and thus could not run for reelection; on January 17, 2024, Elliott announced he was running for the U.S. Senate.

Six candidates joined in the race for mayor including major candidates 3rd Ward Wheeling Councilwoman Rosemary Ketchum, Wheeling Vice Mayor Chad Thalman, and retired longtime executive director for the Greater Wheeling Sports and Entertainment Authority, Denny Magruder. Other candidates included insurance agent J.T. Thomas, local businesswoman Beth Hinebaugh, and Carl Carpenter.

2024 Wheeling, West Virginia mayoral election
Candidate	Votes	%
Denny Magruder	2,675	37.19%
Rosemary Ketchum	1,661	23.1%
J.T. Thomas	1,353	18.81%
Chad Thalman	1,074	14.93%
Beth Hinebaugh	384	5.34%
Carl Carpenter	45	0.63%
Total votes	7,192	100.00%

== City council ==
=== Ward 1 ===
Ward 1 Wheeling, West Virginia city council election
Candidate	Votes	%
Tony Assaro	530	47.28%
Paul Alig Sr.	387	34.52%
J. Anthony Edmond	104	9.28%
Josh Becker (withdrawn)	57	5.08%
Zeke Tuel	43	3.83%
Total votes	1,121	100.00%

=== Ward 2 ===
Ward 2 Wheeling, West Virginia city council election
Candidate	Votes	%
Ben Seidler	400	62.89%
Carlee Dittmar	122	19.18%
Melissa Rebholz	114	17.92%
Total votes	636	100.00%

=== Ward 3 ===
Ward 3 Wheeling, West Virginia city council election
Candidate	Votes	%
Connie Cain	202	32.06%
Jerome "Jake" Henry	199	31.58%
Chris Hamm	188	29.84%
George Greenbaum	41	6.50%
Total votes	630	100.00%

=== Ward 4 ===
Ward 4 Wheeling, West Virginia city council election
Candidate	Votes	%
Jerry Sklavounakis	894	63.14%
John Prather	522	36.86%
Total votes	1,416	100.00%

=== Ward 5 ===
Ward 5 Wheeling, West Virginia city council election
Candidate	Votes	%
Ty Thorngate	1,079	64.88%
Julia Chaplin	387	23.27%
Keltus Emmerth (withdrawn)	197	11.85%
Total votes	1,663	100.00%

=== Ward 6 ===
Ward 6 Wheeling, West Virginia city council election
Candidate	Votes	%
Dave Palmer	791	71.78%
Nicholas McCort	311	28.22%
Total votes	1,102	100.00%
