= List of non-binary political office-holders =

This is a list of officeholders which openly self-identify as non-binary (i.e. genderqueer) or agender, bigender, genderfluid, genderqueer, or otherwise identify as under the non-binary gender umbrella. There has been an increase in non-binary legislators in recent years. The LGBTQ+ Victory Institute recorded that 52 officials were under the non-binary gender umbrella in 2024, an increase of 69.6 percent from the year before, while Orie Givens, Vice President of Communications, for the same organization, described the legislators work as "pivotal" to resist efforts to "restrict identity to the gender binary."

This list is organized alphabetically by surname (i.e. last name), or by a single name if the individual does not have a surname. Some officeholders listed were not elected while out as non-binary, and either came out, or were outed, at a later date.

== List ==
=== Asia ===
Name	Office held	Tenure	Political party	Identity	Notes	Country
Gopi Shankar Madurai	South Region Representative of National Council for Transgender Persons	2020–2022		Genderqueer	Also said to help people who "struggle with their gender preferences."	India
Gopi Shankar Madurai	South Region Representative of National Council for Transgender Persons	2020–2022		Intersex	Also said to help people who "struggle with their gender preferences."	India
Audrey Tang	Minister without Portfolio of Taiwan	2016–2022	N/A, Independent	Non-binary Trans woman	The first transgender person and the first non-binary official in the top executive cabinet.	Taiwan
Audrey Tang	Minister for Digital Affairs of Taiwan	2022–2024	N/A, Independent	Non-binary Trans woman	The first transgender person and the first non-binary official in the top executive cabinet.	Taiwan

=== Europe ===
Name	Office held	Tenure	Political party	Identity	Notes	Country
Sibylle Berg	MEP of European Parliament	2024–present	Die PARTEI	Non-binary	Part of Straight Edge and non-binary.	Germany
Gregor Murray	Dundee Councillor	2017-2022	Scottish National Party	Non-binary transgender	Elected in 2017, afterwards left politics citing pressures associated with social media. Was the first, and, at the time, only openly transgender politician in Scotland.	United Kingdom
Owen Hurcum	Mayor of Bangor, Gwynedd	2021–2022	N/A, Independent (2021–2022)	Non-binary	First openly non-binary mayor of any city world-wide and the youngest person in history to hold a mayoral position in Wales.	United Kingdom
Danny Keeling	Councillor for London Borough of Newham	2022–present	Green Party of England and Wales	Non-binary	First openly non-binary councillor, and opposition leader, who left a council meeting in February 2023 after two council members, of the Labour Party misgendered them.	United Kingdom
Ines Kostić	MP of House of Representatives	2023–present	Party for the Animals	Non-binary	In an interview, they said they doesn't want to be simply labeled as "the first non-binary MP," but says it is part of who they are. They are also vegan and a refugee.	Netherlands
Kira Lewis	London Borough of Waltham Forest Councillor	2022-	Labour Party	Non-binary	Resigned a cabinet office following a petition after her social media post calling Hamas "no good for Palestinians and no good for Jews," claiming the organization "wants a fundamentalist Muslim dictatorship on the land from the river to the sea, devoid of all Jews" and called Hamas "evil," adding that Israeli bombardment in Gaza is bad "but not evil." She identifies as transgender and non-binary.	United Kingdom
Kira Lewis	London Borough of Waltham Forest Councillor	2022-	Labour Party	Trans	Resigned a cabinet office following a petition after her social media post calling Hamas "no good for Palestinians and no good for Jews," claiming the organization "wants a fundamentalist Muslim dictatorship on the land from the river to the sea, devoid of all Jews" and called Hamas "evil," adding that Israeli bombardment in Gaza is bad "but not evil." She identifies as transgender and non-binary.	United Kingdom
Lin Lindner	MP of Bundestag	2025–present	Die Linke	Non-binary		Germany
Little Brighouse	Powys County Councillor	2022-	Liberal Democrats (May 2022)	Trans-Nonbinary	Elected in 2022 as a Liberal Democrat, but soon after was suspended by the party pending investigation into content regarding Palestine on social media. Brighouse identifies as "trans-nonbinary," according the Brecon and Radnor Express.	United Kingdom
Little Brighouse	Powys County Councillor	2022-	Non-affiliated (2022-present)	Trans-Nonbinary	Elected in 2022 as a Liberal Democrat, but soon after was suspended by the party pending investigation into content regarding Palestine on social media. Brighouse identifies as "trans-nonbinary," according the Brecon and Radnor Express.	United Kingdom
Edward Lord	Councillor for the City of London	2001–present	Liberal Democrats	Non-binary	Openly non-binary since 2018.	United Kingdom
Mina Tolu	Deputy Chairperson of AD+PD	2023–2025	AD+PD	Non-binary	Use they/them pronouns and emphasized importance of respecting gender pronouns, especially of non-binary people.	Malta

=== North America ===
Name	Office held	Tenure	Political party	Identity	Notes	Country
Maebe A. Girl	Silver Lake Neighborhood Council Member	2022–2025	Democratic Party	Non-binary	Girl is the first drag queen elected to public office in the United States. She is a three-time candidate for California's 30th congressional district and the first non-binary person to advance to a general election for a House seat. Girl is non-binary and uses she/her and they/them pronouns.	United States
Uzoma Asagwara	Deputy Premier of Manitoba	2023–present	New Democratic Party	Genderqueer	First MLA, in the history of Manitoba, to be openly queer and Black.	Canada
Uzoma Asagwara	Minister of Health, Seniors and Long-term Care for Manitoba	2023–present	New Democratic Party	Genderqueer	First MLA, in the history of Manitoba, to be openly queer and Black.	Canada
Uzoma Asagwara	Legislator of Legislative Assembly of Manitoba	2019–present	New Democratic Party	Genderqueer	Representing Union Station	Canada
Lorena Austin	Representative for Arizona House of Representatives	2023–present	Democratic Party	Non-binary	First out nonbinary legislator in Arizona, and first nonbinary Chicane legislator in the United States; represents District 9.	United States
Liliana Bakhtiari	Councilor of Atlanta City Council	2022–present		Non-binary	First out queer Muslim elected official from Georgia, and in a relationship with two women.	United States
Blaizen Bloom	Non-male co-chair of Green Party of Virginia	2021–present	Green Party of the United States	Non-binary		United States
Blaizen Bloom	Non-male co-chair of Green Party of Virginia	2021–present	Green Party of the United States	Genderfluid		United States
Estefan Cortes-Vargas	MLA of Legislative Assembly of Alberta	2015–2019	New Democratic Party	Non-binary	Represented Strathcona-Sherwood Park. First openly trans, non-binary, queer MLA in Canada.	Canada
Estefan Cortes-Vargas	MLA of Legislative Assembly of Alberta	2015–2019	New Democratic Party	Transgender	Represented Strathcona-Sherwood Park. First openly trans, non-binary, queer MLA in Canada.	Canada
Brion Curran	Legislator of Minnesota House of Representatives	2023–present	Minnesota Democratic–Farmer–Labor Party	Non-binary	With Liish Kozlowski, one of the first nonbinary legislators in Minnesota. Curran came out as nonbinary between their 2022 and 2024 elections; represents District 36B.	United States
Blake Desjarlais	MP of House of Commons of Canada	2021–2025	New Democratic Party	Two-spirit	Representing Edmonton Griesbach, first openly two-spirit individual to serve in Parliament.	Canada
Emily Dievendorf	Representative of Michigan House of Representatives	2023–present	Democratic Party	Non-binary	First out non-binary legislator in Michigan; represents the 77th District.	United States
Brandy Fortson	Board member of Corvallis, Oregon School Board	2019–2022		Non-binary	First nonbinary person to hold office in Oregon.	United States
Keturah Herron	Legislator of Kentucky House of Representatives	2022–2025	Democratic Party	Non-binary	A "queer, masculine-presenting woman" who uses she and they pronouns, and was first out LGBTQ+ member in the Kentucky House of Representatives when elected in 2022.	United States
Keturah Herron	Kentucky state senator	2025–present	Democratic Party	Non-binary	A "queer, masculine-presenting woman" who uses she and they pronouns, and was first out LGBTQ+ member in the Kentucky House of Representatives when elected in 2022.	United States
SJ Howell	Montana state representative	2023–present	Democratic Party	Non-binary transgender	Representing District 100; became the first nonbinary state legislator in Montana when they were elected. Is also a transgender person.	United States
Stephen Coleman Kenny	Commissioner of Washington, D.C. Advisory Neighborhood Commission	2022–2025		Non-binary	First nonbinary person to hold elected office in Washington, D.C.; represents 1A05.	United States
Liish Kozlowski	Minnesota state representative	2023–present	Minnesota Democratic–Farmer–Labor Party	Non-binary	With Brion Curran, one of the first nonbinary legislators in Minnesota, with Mexican and Anishinaabe-Ojibwe ancestry.	United States
Liish Kozlowski	Minnesota state representative	2023–present	Minnesota Democratic–Farmer–Labor Party	Two-spirit	With Brion Curran, one of the first nonbinary legislators in Minnesota, with Mexican and Anishinaabe-Ojibwe ancestry.	United States
Amita Kuttner	Interim Leader of Green Party of Canada	2021–2022		Non-binary	First transgender person and first person of East Asian descent to lead a federal party in Canada, is non-binary, and a pansexual astrophysicist.	Canada
Amita Kuttner	Interim Leader of Green Party of Canada	2021–2022		Transgender	First transgender person and first person of East Asian descent to lead a federal party in Canada, is non-binary, and a pansexual astrophysicist.	
Amita Kuttner	Interim Leader of Green Party of Canada	2021–2022		Pansexual	First transgender person and first person of East Asian descent to lead a federal party in Canada, is non-binary, and a pansexual astrophysicist.	
Lisa Lachance	Legislator of Nova Scotia House of Assembly	2021–present	Nova Scotia New Democratic Party	Genderqueer	Representing Halifax Citadel-Sable Island.	Canada
Terra Lawson-Remer	Chair of San Diego County Board of Supervisors	2025–present	Democratic Party	Non-binary	Described by Victory Fund, in 2020, as helping to "restore LGBTQ representation" on the San Diego County Board of Supervisors and representing the 3rd District.	United States
Terra Lawson-Remer	Vice-Chair of San Diego County Board of Supervisors	2023–2025	Democratic Party	Pansexual	Described by Victory Fund, in 2020, as helping to "restore LGBTQ representation" on the San Diego County Board of Supervisors and representing the 3rd District.	United States
Terra Lawson-Remer	Member of San Diego County Board of Supervisors	2021–present	Democratic Party	Pansexual	Described by Victory Fund, in 2020, as helping to "restore LGBTQ representation" on the San Diego County Board of Supervisors and representing the 3rd District.	United States
Catherine McKenney	MPP of Legislative Assembly of Ontario	2025–present	Ontario New Democratic Party	Non-binary	Elected in 2024.	Canada
Catherine McKenney	Councilor of Ottawa City Council	2014–2022	Ontario New Democratic Party	Non-binary	First non-male openly-LGBT person to serve on Ottawa's city council and left in 2022.	Canada
Honey Mahogany	Member of San Francisco Democratic County Central Committee	2018–present	Democratic Party	Gender non-conforming Transgender person	First transgender person to serve on San Francisco Democratic County Central Committee. Later served as 3rd Vice Chair, San Francisco Democratic County Central Committee, 17th District in 2020.	United States
DeShanna Neal	Representative of Delaware House of Representatives	2022–present	Democratic Party	Non-binary	First non-binary legislator in Delaware; represents District 13.	United States
Thu Nguyen	At-Large Member of Worcester City Council	2022–present	Democratic Party	Non-binary	First openly non-binary candidate elected to public office in Massachusetts history.	United States
Mary Nolan	Councilor of Portland, Oregon Metro Council	2021–present		Non-binary	Nolan came out as nonbinary after taking office; represents District 5.	United States
Joshua Query	Legislator of New Hampshire House of Representatives	2018–2022	Democratic Party	Genderqueer	New Hampshire’s first genderqueer representative.	United States
Venn Sage Wylde	precinct Committee member of Multnomah County, Oregon Democratic Party	2018–present	Democratic Party	Non-binary	They are nonbinary. Following their filing, the County Elections Director determined that the county would add a third column for "committeeperson" to the year's primary ballot, which previously only had space for "committeeman" and "committeewoman."	United States
Venn Sage Wylde	precinct Committee member of Multnomah County, Oregon Democratic Party	2018–present	Democratic Party	Genderfluid	They are nonbinary. Following their filing, the County Elections Director determined that the county would add a third column for "committeeperson" to the year's primary ballot, which previously only had space for "committeeman" and "committeewoman."	
Rita Schenkelberg	Councilor of Bend, Oregon City Council	2020–2022	Democratic Party	Non-binary	First out trans person of color to hold elected office in Oregon and first out nonbinary person to hold municipal office in Oregon.	United States
Cori Schumacher	Councilor of Carlsbad, California City Council	2016–2022	Democratic Party	Non-binary Lesbian	First LGBTQ+ elected official in Carlsbad's history and first "openly gay" champion of world surfing, and uses she/they pronouns.	United States
Ismail Smith-Wade-El	Representative of Pennsylvania House of Representatives	2022–present	Democratic Party	Non-binary	First out nonbinary member of the Pennsylvania state legislature; identifies as queer; represents the 49th District.	United States
Geo Soctomah Neptune	Board member of Indian Township School Board	2020–present		Non-binary	First trans, non-binary, and two-spirit person elected to public office in Maine, in the state's history.	United States
Geo Soctomah Neptune	Board member of Indian Township School Board	2020–present		Transgender	First trans, non-binary, and two-spirit person elected to public office in Maine, in the state's history.	
Geo Soctomah Neptune	Board member of Indian Township School Board	2020–present		Two-spirit	First trans, non-binary, and two-spirit person elected to public office in Maine, in the state's history.	
Wick Thomas	Legislator of Missouri House of Representatives	2025–present	Democratic Party	Non-binary transgender	First out nonbinary, and trans, person elected to state office in Missouri; represents District 19.	United States
Lane Tredger	House Leader of Yukon New Democratic Party	2021–present	Yukon New Democratic Party	Non-binary	Yukon's first out non-binary MLA. Represented Whitehorse Centre in assembly.	Canada
Lane Tredger	Legislator of Yukon Legislative Assembly	2021–present	Yukon New Democratic Party	Non-binary	Yukon's first out non-binary MLA. Represented Whitehorse Centre in assembly.	Canada
Mauree Turner	Legislator of Oklahoma House of Representatives	2021–present	Democratic Party	Non-binary femme	First publicly non-binary U.S. state lawmaker, transgender state legislator of color, and the first Muslim member of the Oklahoma Legislature, represented 88th district. They were also described as the first openly non-binary state legislator in U.S. history.	United States
Kristyn Wong-Tam	MPP of Legislative Assembly of Ontario	2022–present	Ontario New Democratic Party	Non-binary	Represents Toronto Centre, and called themselves, on social media, "first Asian-Canadian queer, non-binary person" elected in Queen's Park.	Canada
Kristyn Wong-Tam	Councilor of Toronto City Council	2010–2022	Ontario New Democratic Party	Non-binary	Elected as independent and criticized by some for "downplaying her connections to unions, the NDP and Queers Against Israeli Apartheid (QuAIA)" during her campaign.	Canada

=== Oceania ===
Name	Office held	Tenure	Political party	Identity	Notes	Country
Ro Allen	Victorian Equal Opportunity and Human Rights Commissioner	2021–present		Non-binary	Appointed commissioner first in 2015, and again in 2021, Allen described themselves as "a bit of a walker between genders" and gender diverse.	Australia
Ro Allen	Victoria, Australia Commissioner for LGBTIQ+ Communities	2015–2021		Non-binary	Appointed commissioner first in 2015, and again in 2021, Allen described themselves as "a bit of a walker between genders" and gender diverse.	Australia
Benjamin Doyle	Member of party list for New Zealand Parliament	2024–2025	Green Party of Aotearoa New Zealand	Non-binary	Uses they, he, and ia pronouns, and said they are "proudly takatāpui and whaikaha." Doyle is "the first openly non-binary MP" in Pāremata Aotearoa history."	New Zealand
Benjamin Doyle	Member of party list for New Zealand Parliament	2024–2025	Green Party of Aotearoa New Zealand	Takatāpui	Uses they, he, and ia pronouns, and said they are "proudly takatāpui and whaikaha." Doyle is "the first openly non-binary MP" in Pāremata Aotearoa history."	New Zealand
Jax Fox	Councilor of Hobart City Council	2018–2022	N/A, Independent	Non-binary Trans woman	First elected political officeholder in Tasmania to be openly non-binary and transgender. Fox described herself, on social media, as "out and proud nonbinary queer" and noted their dead name.	Australia
Kat McNamara	Legislator of Northern Territory Legislative Assembly	2024–present	Greens	Non-binary transgender	First openly transgender politician in Australia at a state or territory level. Represents electoral division of Nightcliff.	Australia
Erin Moroney	Council member of Campbelltown City Council	2020–present	N/A, Independent	Non-binary	First politician in New South Wales to identify as non-binary.	Australia
Erin Moroney	Council member of Campbelltown City Council	2020–present	N/A, Independent	Gender neutral	First politician in New South Wales to identify as non-binary.	Australia

=== South America ===
Name	Office held	Tenure	Political party	Identity	Notes	Country
Tamara Argote	Colombian House of Representatives MP	2015–present	Pacto Histórico	Non-binary	First non-binary person elected to the legislature in Colombia.	Colombia
París Galán	Legislator of La Paz Departmental Legislative Assembly	2015–2021	Sovereignty and Liberty (2014–2021)	Non-binary Trans man	One of just two queer people and the second gay man in Bolivia to have held political office as a lawmaker, after Manuel Canelas.	Bolivia
Ariel Lucho López	Councillor of General La Madrid, Buenos Aires Province	2023–present		Non-binary	First openly non-binary Argentinian legislator.	Argentina
