= Jess Herbst =

American politician and transgender rights activist

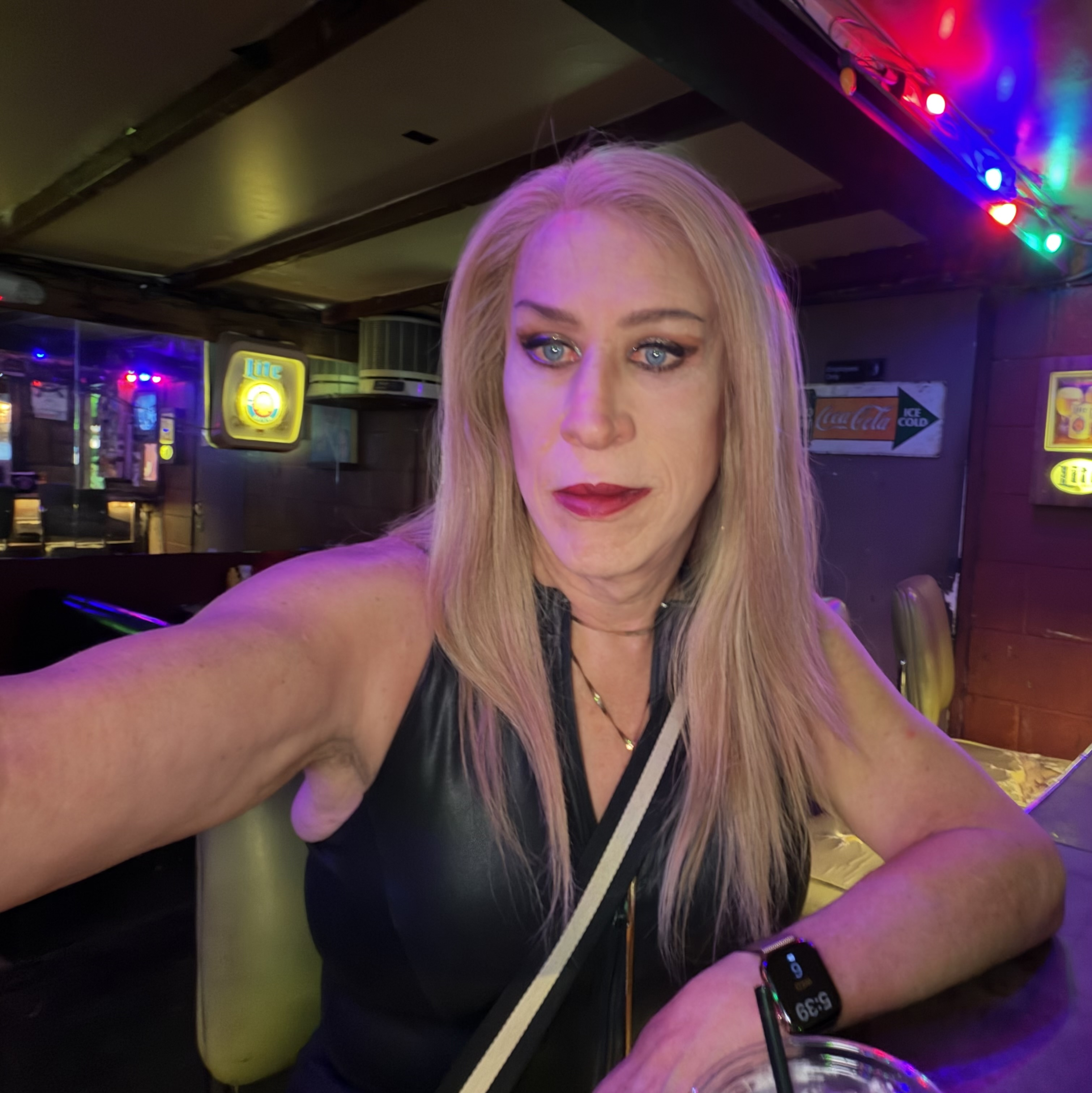
Spring 2026

Jess Helene Herbst (born October 14, 1958) is an American politician and transgender rights activist, who served as the mayor of New Hope, Texas, from May 2016 until May 2018. Herbst became the first openly transgender mayor in Texas in 2016 when the then-mayor suffered a heart attack and died days before the election, but still won, leaving the town without a mayor. Herbst, who was Mayor pro-tem, was then appointed to the position.

== Politics ==
Herbst has lived in New Hope, Texas, since 1999. She previously served as alderman, road commissioner and mayor pro-tem. Herbst became mayor of the town, which has an aldermanic form of government, in May 2016 after the previous mayor died while seeking reelection. In an open letter to the town residents, Herbst came out as transgender on January 23, 2017. Herbst states the reaction to her coming out has been "overwhelmingly positive."

Residents in the tiny town of New Hope voted out Mayor Jess Herbst on Saturday, May 5, 2018, preventing her from becoming the first openly transgender elected official in Texas. Herbst lost to Angel Hamm, the widow of the former mayor. Melissa Brown finished second in the race. Herbst said that she became a victim of an anonymous smear campaign during the week before the election that she said lost her the trust of her voters.

=== Bathroom bill opposition ===
In January 2017, Herbst criticized Texas Lieutenant Governor Dan Patrick for supporting the controversial "bathroom bill", which would require Texas residents to use bathrooms according to their sex designation on their birth certificate. Herbst wrote "Mr. Patrick: Let me get this straight, are you saying that right now, without your bill being passed, anyone can assault someone in the bathroom without breaking the law? That's some kind of weird screwed-up loophole if so."

She testified before the Texas Senate committee on State affairs against House Bill 6, also known as the Bathroom bill. The committee heard from over 1500 citizens who voiced 85% opposition to the bill. In spite of this they passed to bill on to the full senate which then passed it with little debate.

Herbst returned to testify in the house hearing, waiting until 3:15am to give her testimony. Again the testimony was greater than 85% against. The House committee on State Affairs declined to vote, thus allowing the bill to die.

Texas Lt. Governor Dan Patrick orchestrated a plan to force the issue by blocking critical spending legislation, thus forcing a special session.

In July 2017 at a cost of an estimated $1 million to Texas tax payers, the special session convened. Herbst was an active participant in One Texas Resistance, a broad coalition of human rights organizations and grassroot activists. One Texas Resistance organized protests every day of the session, objecting to anti-immigration, anti-adoption, anti-abortion, anti-LGBTQ and other bills encroaching human rights.

The process began as in the regular session with the Senate Committee on State Affairs again holding a hearing. Herbst testified first in a full day of testimony, followed third by Ashley Smith, the transgender architect who posted the famous photo of herself with Governor Greg Abbott. Testimony this time was 93% against. The Committee passed the bill as expected and a few days later the Senate took up the debate, this time lasting six hours. A one-point testimony from Libby Gonzales and Mayor Herbst was read verbatim on the senate floor.

In the following weeks on the Capitol steps were press conferences by state law enforcement officials and business and religious leaders stating their opposition to the bathroom bill. The House, led by a staunch opponent and House Speaker Joe Straus III, declined to give the bill consideration, allowing the bill to die again.

== Transition ==
Herbst recalled being drawn to women's clothing when she was approximately three years old. In 2015, Herbst began hormone replacement therapy. Toward the end of September 2016, Herbst began living full-time as a woman. In February 2017, Caitlyn Jenner, herself a transgender woman, commented on Herbst's transition. In a statement to Fortune, Jenner stated "Everyone's journey is unique and different. I'm so happy for her."

== Personal life ==
Herbst attended East Texas State University. At a showing of the Rocky Horror Picture Show, Herbst met Debbie Gray, who would eventually become her wife. In 2018, Herbst completed Harvard University's John F. Kennedy School of Government program for Senior Executives in State and Local Government as a David Bohnett LGBTQ Victory Institute Leadership Fellow.

Herbst and her wife Debbie Gray Herbst have two adult daughters & 3 grandchildren.

Jess & Debbie separated in spring 2024, divorced 2025 after 44 years of marriage.

== See also ==
- List of transgender public officeholders in the United States
