= Alison Murphy =

American politician

Member-elect of the New Hampshire House of Representatives from the Merrimack 22nd district
- Assuming office December 2026
- Succeeding: James Roesener

Personal details
- Party: Democratic

Alison Murphy is an American politician. A member of the Democratic Party, she is the member-elect for the Merrimack 22nd district of the New Hampshire House of Representatives.
