= Dylan Orr =

American public servant

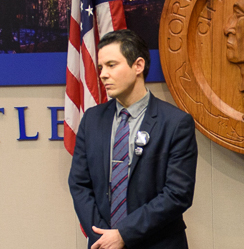
- Orr in 2016
- Born: 1979 (age 46–47); Seattle, Washington, U.S.
- Education: Smith College (BA); University of Washington (JD)
- Known for: First transgender person appointed to a presidential administration

Dylan Orr (born 1979) is an American government official. He is the director of Environmental Health Services for King County, Washington. He was formerly the director of the Office of Labor Standards for the City of Seattle from 2015 to 2018. In that role, Orr was responsible for enforcing Seattle's historic minimum wage law, as well as its paid sick and safe time law, wage theft law, and fair chance employment law.

Previously, Orr was chief of staff to assistant secretary Kathy Martinez in the Office of Disability Employment Policy. As part of the United States Department of Labor, he contributed to the development of national disability employment-related regulations and policies, including regulations issued under Section 503 of the Rehabilitation Act of 1973. As the Department of Labor representative, he also worked with the White House Office of National AIDS Policy on the implementation of the President's National HIV/AIDS Strategy, in addition to making significant contributions to several federal LGBT policies and regulations. He was recruited to the administration by the University of Washington School of Law professor and former EEOC Commissioner Paul Steven Miller. Previously, he was special assistant and advisor to assistant secretary Martinez. Upon his appointment to his role as special assistant in 2009, he became the first openly transgender person appointed to any U.S. presidential administration.

== Early life and career ==
Orr was born and raised in Seattle, Washington. He worked at the Conservation Law Foundation and the Department of Children and Families in Massachusetts (formerly the Department of Social Services). After moving back to Seattle, Orr held positions at Marten Law Group, Disability Rights Washington, MacDonald Hoague and Bayless, and Columbia Legal Services. In late 2009, he accepted an appointment to the Obama administration.

== Education ==
Orr received his Bachelor of Arts in anthropology from Smith College and his Juris Doctor from the University of Washington School of Law. He is a member of the Washington State Bar Association.

== Recognition ==
- LGBT appointments in the Obama-Biden administration
- 2012 Featured in Out Out100: The White House
- 2013 Gay Politics Guest Blog: Transgender Day of Remembrance; a Note on HumaniTy
- 2013 Community Advocate Award by the Massachusetts Transgender Political Coalition
- 2013 Julie Johnson Founder's Award by the National Center for Transgender Equality
- 2014 Best Lawyers Under 40 by the LGBT Bar Association
- 2015-2016 German Marshall Fund of the United States Marshall Memorial Fellow

== See also ==
- List of transgender public officeholders in the United States
