= James Roesener =

American politician

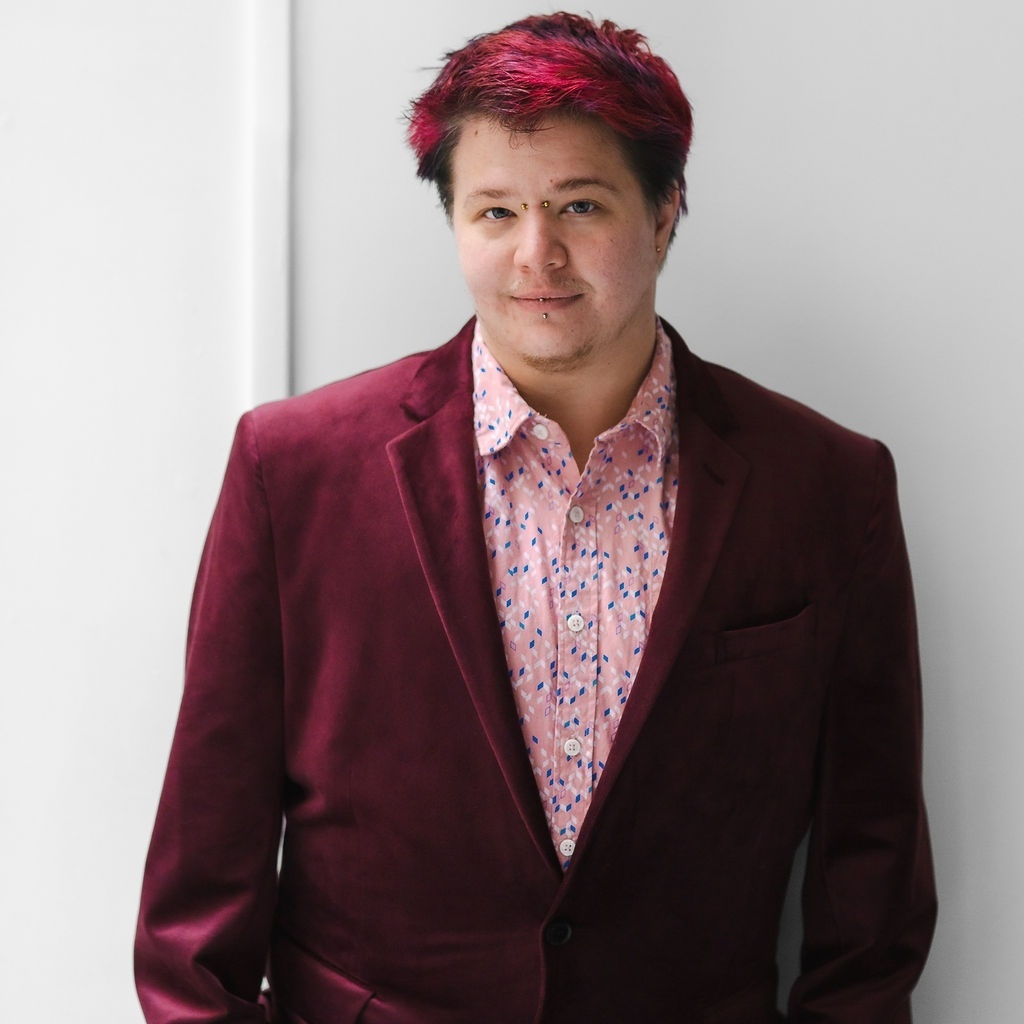
- Roesener in 2025

Member of the New Hampshire House of Representatives from the Merrimack 22nd district
- Incumbent
- Assumed office December 7, 2022
- Preceded by: Matthew Pitaro
- Succeeded by: Alison Murphy (elect)

Personal details
- Born: 1995 or 1996 (age 30–31)
- Party: Democratic

James Leon Roesener is an American politician who serves in the New Hampshire House of Representatives from the 22nd district in Merrimack County, as a member of the Democratic Party. He was the first openly transgender man elected to any state legislature in the United States.

== Early life ==
James Leon Roesener first learned what transgender meant at age 12. He attended high school within the Merrimack Valley.

== Career ==
In the 2022 election, Roesener ran for a seat in the New Hampshire House of Representatives from the 22nd district in Merrimack County with the Democratic nomination and defeated Republican nominee D. Soucy. Roesener was inspired to run after Roe v. Wade was overturned by Dobbs v. Jackson Women's Health Organization and in response to anti-LGBT legislation across the United States. His victory made his the first openly transgender man elected to a state legislature in the United States. He defeated Republican nominee Dennis Blankenbeker in the 2024 election.

During Roesener's tenure in the state house he has served on the Fish and Game committee.

== Personal life ==
Roesener is openly transgender and bisexual. He is married.

== Political positions ==
Roesener supports Medicaid coverage for abortions. In 2023, Roesener was among 14 transgender and non-binary legislators across the United States that signed a letter opposing changes to Title IX by President Joe Biden that would allow schools to ban individual athletes if they were believed to have a competitive advantage. He participated in a protest against the United States Immigration and Customs Enforcement in 2026.

== Electoral history ==
Electoral history of Kurt Wright
Year	Office	Party	Primary			General			Result	Ref.
Year	Office	Party	Total	%	P.	Total	%	P.	Result	Ref.
2022	New Hampshire House of Representatives (Merrimack 22)	Democratic	301	99.34%	1st	954	55.47%	1st	Won	
2024	New Hampshire House of Representatives (Merrimack 22)	Democratic	432	99.54%	1st	2,231	55.76%	1st	Won	

== See also ==
- Gerri Cannon and Lisa Bunker, first transgender members of the New Hampshire House of Representatives
- List of transgender public officeholders in the United States

== Works cited ==
=== News ===
- Factora, James (November 8, 2022). "James Roesener Is the First Out Trans Man Elected to a U.S. State Legislature". Them. Archived from the original on June 6, 2026.
- Rynston-Lobel, Eric (April 16, 2023). "Concord state rep. James Roesener among signees of letter to President Biden pushing back on the administration's transgender athlete proposal". Concord Monitor. Archived from the original on June 6, 2026.
- Towfighi, Michaela (March 27, 2023). "For new Concord lawmaker, 'parental bill of rights' was personal fight". Concord Monitor. Archived from the original on June 6, 2026.
- Treisman, Rachel (November 9, 2022). "James Roesener is the first out trans man elected to a U.S. state legislature". NPR. Archived from the original on June 6, 2026.
- Wisniewski, Emilia (January 29, 2026). "'Stick up for those who can't': Concord High students walk out to protest ICE". Concord Monitor. Archived from the original on June 6, 2026.

=== Web ===
- "2022 State Representative Democratic Primary Merrimack 22 District". New Hampshire Public Radio. Archived from the original on June 6, 2026.
- "2022 State Representative General Election Merrimack 22 District". New Hampshire Public Radio. Archived from the original on June 6, 2026.
- "2024 State Representative Democratic Primary Merrimack 22 District". New Hampshire Public Radio. Archived from the original on June 6, 2026.
- "2024 State Representative General Election Merrimack 22 District". New Hampshire Public Radio. Archived from the original on June 6, 2026.
- "James Leon Roesener". Ballotpedia. Archived from the original on June 6, 2026.
