= Alisson Turcotte =

American politician

Member of the New Hampshire House of Representatives
- In office December 7, 2022 – December 4, 2024
- Preceded by: Matthew Pitaro
- Succeeded by: Matthew Pitaro
- Constituency: 11th Merrimack (2022-2024)
- In office December 5, 2012 – December 2, 2020
- Preceded by: Jon Richardson
- Succeeded by: Matthew Pitaro
- Constituency: 22nd Merrimack (2012-2020)

Personal details
- Party: Democratic

Alisson Turcotte (formerly Alan Turcotte) is an American politician in New Hampshire. A member of the Democratic Party, she served in the New Hampshire House of Representatives from 2012 to 2020 and 2022 to 2024.

== Career ==
On November 6, 2012, Turcotte was elected to the New Hampshire House of Representatives where she represented the Merrimack 22nd district from 2012 to 2020, and the 11th district from 2022 to 2024. A Democrat, Turcotte first assumed office on December 5, 2012.

She did not run for reelection in 2020, but returned and won in the 2022 election. In 2024, she lost reelection against Republican Matthew Pitaro by 53 votes.

== Personal life ==
Turcotte resides in Allenstown, New Hampshire. She came out as transgender in 2022 and began using the name Alisson after her reelection that year.

== See also ==
- List of transgender public officeholders in the United States
