= Stephe Koontz =

American politician

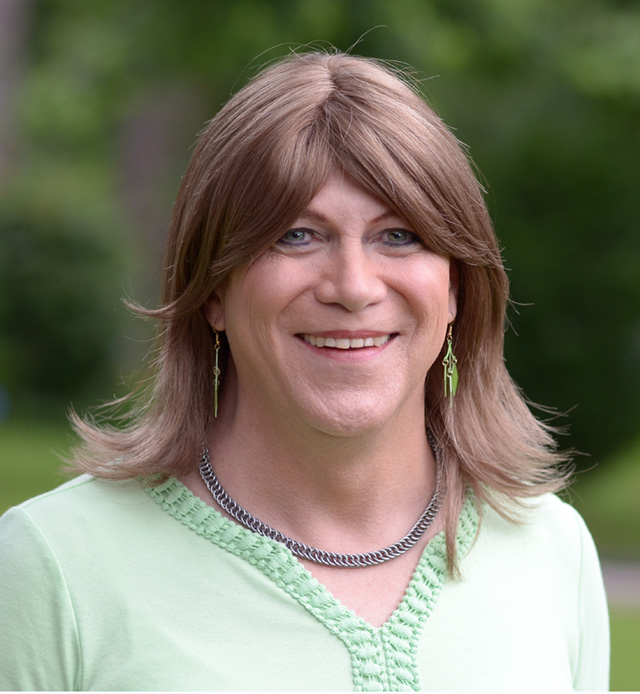

Member of the Doraville City Council
- Incumbent
- Assumed office January 2018
- Preceded by: Sharon Spangler

Stephe Koontz is an American politician, and the first out transgender person to win a contested election in the U.S. state of Georgia. She won a city council seat in the Metro Atlanta city of Doraville on November 7, 2017, on what the Washington Post called "a "historic night for the nation’s transgender community", in which six openly transgender people won elections in the United States. A 32-year resident and political activist in the city, she won by a narrow margin of six votes.

Koontz was invited to speak at the Georgia Alliance for Social Justice and Women's March "Power to the Polls" event on January 21, 2018. She was also featured, with other history-making elected officials, in Human Rights Campaign's nationally distributed Equality magazine. She was given the 2019 Allen Thornell Political Advancement Award by Georgia Equality for her promotion of non-discrimination ordinances across Metro Atlanta cities.

In November 2021, she was re-elected to the Doraville City Council for another four year term, where she will continue to serve as the only openly transgender elected official in the Southeastern United States. She was sworn in on June 26, 2022, as a member of the board of directors of the Georgia Municipal Association for 2022–2023 as the president of District 3 East, which covers the eastern half of metro Atlanta.

== Background ==
Koontz has lived in Doraville since 1985, and retired before running for office. She had owned and managed a few auto repair shops and had worked as a church administrator. She was a director for the Presbytery of Greater Atlanta and a lieutenant governor for the North Atlanta Division of Kiwanis service clubs.

== See also ==
- List of transgender public officeholders in the United States
