= Clare Killman =

American politician

Member of the Carbondale, Illinois City Council
- Incumbent
- Assumed office May 9, 2023

Personal details
- Born: Poplar Bluff, Missouri
- Education: University of Southern Illinois; University of Springfield

Clare Killman is an American politician serving on the Carbondale City Council in southern Illinois. She is the first transgender city council member in Illinois.

== Early life ==
Killman was born and raised in Poplar Bluff, Missouri, where her parents were both members of the Southern Baptist Convention. She came out as transgender when she was 14, after which her parents placed her in conversion therapy. To get away and be able to transition, she graduated high school a year early and moved to Carbondale at 17. She attended cosmetology school and the fashion design program at the University of Southern Illinois to "learn the cultural forms...so I could put myself on the path toward being understood by society as a woman."

== Political career ==
Before being elected to office, Killman worked as a staffer on a 2020 congressional campaign and created a divestment plan for downsizing Carbondale's police force, which led her into working in Illinois's First Circuit Court as a mediator.

She was elected to the Carbondale City Council in 2023, becoming the first transgender person to serve on a city council in the state. While in office, Killman introduced and had passed unanimously a human rights title in Carbondale stating that everyone has the right to access healthcare in the city, even if they may be coming from a place where that care (such as hormone replacement therapy) is illegal, and that Carbondale will not hand over that health information to any entity seeking it.

Killman has described herself politically as an advocate of social decentralization along the lines of Murray Bookchin, where power is centralized at the lowest possible level, and that she does not want a strong state or federal government. After the 2024 presidential election, she called for the state of Illinois to secede from the rest of the US.

In April 2026, Killman announced she would not run for reelection when her four-year term on the council ends.

== Personal life ==
Killman also serves on the board of the Golden Rainbows of Southern Illinois, a support program for aging LGBTQ+ people in the area, and is a public policy student at the University of Springfield.
