= Laura Calvo =

Transgender politician in Oregon

Laura Calvo (born in the 1960s) is an American politician and activist based in Oregon. She has been known for being the first transgender woman to be elected to the Democratic National Committee. She has worked and helped pass laws that have helped the LGBTQ+ community, such as the Oregon Equality Act. She is the treasurer of the Democratic Party of Oregon.

Calvo was born to an immigrant family in the Haight-Ashbury neighborhood of San Francisco and studied there until college. Calvo went to school for public service as a paramedic in Haight-Ashbury. During that time she also had her first political activity, helping Harvey Milk’s campaign with gay rights. Later, she moved to The Grant in the 1980s to pursue law enforcement and political activism.

Calvo came out as transgender three times throughout this time. To herself, then involuntarily outed and then by her choice.

In 2004 Calvo moved to Portland, where she still continues to live. Calvo was out of work and lost her career in law enforcement, and endured many judgments and discrimination against her. Through her hardships Calvo received an email asking for her help from an organization to create a law for people who have been mistreated because of their sexual orientation and gender identity. She accepted and testified in-person of her problems in work. Calvo then started working as the Treasurer of the Democratic Party of Oregon.

In early 2013, Calvo became the first transgender woman to be elected to the Democratic National Committee. She helped pass the Oregon's Equality Act and Family Fairness Act. She has become a leader in the BRO's Transgender Justice Program. She is also a part of the Q Center’s Board of Directors. Calvo won the Pride Award from Pride Northwest and the International Foundation of Gender Education Trinity award.

== See also ==
- List of transgender public officeholders in the United States
