= Rosemary Ketchum =

American politician and community organizer

Member of the Wheeling City Council for Ward 3
- In office July 1, 2020 – June 30, 2024
- Preceded by: Melinda Koslik
- Succeeded by: Connie Cain

Personal details
- Born: 1993 or 1994 (age 31–32)
- Party: Democratic
- Education: West Virginia Northern Community College; Wheeling Jesuit University
- Website: rosemaryketchum.com

Rosemary Ketchum (born c. 1993) is an American politician and community organizer serving as a city councillor for Ward 3 of Wheeling, West Virginia from 2020 to 2024. She is the first transgender person elected to political office in West Virginia. In 2024, she unsuccessfully ran for mayor of Wheeling.

== Life ==
Ketchum was born c. 1993 and raised in East Liverpool, Ohio. Her mother worked as a waitress and bartender and her father worked at a porcelain factory. As a child, Ketchum's family was homeless after their home burned down. She moved to West Virginia with her parents. She earned degrees in psychology from West Virginia Northern Community College and Wheeling Jesuit University in 2019.

Ketchum worked was a community organizer, serving as the associate director of the National Alliance on Mental Illness of Greater Wheeling in Wheeling, West Virginia. She is a member of the Wheeling human rights commission and served on the board of the West Virginia American Civil Liberties Union.

On July 12, 2019, Ketchum announced that she would seek election to the Wheeling city council from Ward 3. On June 9, 2020, she won the non-partisan municipal election against Peggy Niebergall, Jerome Henry, and Erick Marple, becoming the first transgender person elected to political office in West Virginia. Following her victory she was praised by Annise Parker, the former Mayor of Houston, Texas, and congratulated by GLAAD. Ketchum is the subject of the 2020 West Virginia Public Broadcasting documentary Rosemary. She was a candidate for mayor of Wheeling in the 2024 election, coming in second against Denny Magruder.

== Electoral history ==
Ward 3 Wheeling, West Virginia city council election
Candidate	Votes	%
Rosemary Ketchum	287	39.26%
Peggy Niebergall	272	37.21%
Jermone Henry	137	18.74%
Erik Marple	35	4.79%
Total votes	731	100.0%

== See also ==
- LGBT rights in West Virginia
- List of LGBT politicians in the United States
- List of transgender public officeholders in the United States
- List of transgender political office-holders
