= Michelle Bruce =

American politician (1961–2022)

Member of the Riverdale, Georgia City Council
- In office January 12, 2004 – January 12, 2008
- Preceded by: Anne Dunivin
- Succeeded by: Wayne Hall

Personal details
- Born: October 25, 1961 Atlanta, Georgia, US
- Died: September 27, 2022 (aged 60)

Michelle Bruce (October 25, 1961 – September 27, 2022) was an American politician who served on the Riverdale City Council in Georgia. She was the first transgender politician in Georgia.

== Personal life ==
Bruce was born intersex, and identified as a transgender woman from a young age. She served in the United States Coast Guard.

Bruce died in 2022, aged 60.

== Political career ==
In 2003, Bruce ran for City Council in Riverdale while serving as a car repossessor. She had never held elected office before, but she won one of the four council seats unopposed after the incumbent dropped out. Her platform included neighborhood watch programs and a police bicycle patrol for the town.

While in office, she introduced legislation to add sexual orientation and gender identity to Riverdale's nondiscrimination policy for city employees, but the measure was defeated by a 3–2 vote. She was also involved in a campaign to recall mayor Phaedra Graham from office in 2005, for which she was reported to the Georgia Secretary of State over ultimately baseless allegations of forging signatures. The recall campaign was unsuccessful, and Graham remained in office.

=== Lawsuit over gender presentation ===
In 2007, Bruce ran for reelection to the city council against Wayne Hall and Georgia Fuller. She was the subject of several transphobic attacks in the lead-up to the election, but ultimately placed first in November with 41% of the vote, to Hall's 27% and Fuller's 22%. However, because no candidate received over 50% of the vote, a runoff election was scheduled for December between Bruce and Hall.

In response to losing the election, Fuller filed a lawsuit against Bruce alleging she had misled voters by identifying as female; the lawsuit asked for the November election results to be voided and another general election to be called. Fuller's attorney claimed Riverdale voters were more likely to vote for female candidates and thus presenting as a woman gave Bruce an "unfair advantage". Riverdale's city attorney defended Bruce, and the lawsuit was dismissed the day before the runoff election.

Bruce lost the runoff to Hall, 42%–58%. She blamed Fuller's lawsuit for her defeat.

In 2008, the Georgia Supreme Court unanimously ruled in favor of Bruce, finding there was no evidence she had defrauded voters based on her gender presentation. As the lawsuit was the first known case of this kind, the Georgia court's ruling created precedent that running for election while presenting as something other than one's assigned sex at birth did not constitute fraud.
