= Georgia Budget & Policy Institute =

Nonprofit organization based in Atlanta, Georgia

- Abbreviation: GBPI
- Formation: 2004
- Founder: Alan Essig
- Type: Nonprofit organization
- Headquarters: 50 Hurt Plaza, Suite 720, Atlanta, Georgia, 30303
- Fields: Tax policy, policy analysis
- Executive director: Taifa Smith Butler
- Website: gbpi.org

The Georgia Budget & Policy Institute (abbreviated GBPI) is an American nonprofit organization based in Atlanta, Georgia, United States, that analyzes tax policies and proposed budgets in Georgia.

== History ==
It was founded in 2004 by Alan Essig, who served as its executive director until January 2015, when he left the organization for Lansing, Michigan. When he left, Essig was replaced by Taifa Smith Butler, who had previously been the organization's deputy director since 2011.

== Reception ==
Although the GBPI describes itself as nonpartisan, it has been described as left-leaning by The Stanly News and Press and Politifact.
