= Stacie-Marie Laughton =

American sex offender and former politician (born 1983/84)

Member of the New Hampshire House of Representatives from the 31st Hillsborough district
- In office December 2, 2020 – December 22, 2022

Personal details
- Born: 1983 or 1984 (age 42)
- Party: Democratic
- Criminal information
- Conviction: November 19, 2025
- Criminal charges: Sexual exploitation of children
- Penalty: 33 years in prison

Stacie-Marie Laughton (born 1983 or 1984) is an American sex offender and former politician who served in the New Hampshire House of Representatives from 2020 to 2022, representing District 31 in Hillsborough County. A member of the Democratic Party, she had previously been elected to the chamber in the 2012 elections to represent Ward 4 in Nashua, but resigned after a previous fraud conviction surfaced. She was also a selectwoman in the ward.

Laughton was the first openly transgender elected official in New Hampshire and the first openly transgender person elected to a state legislature anywhere in the United States. Laughton was arrested in June 2023 on sexual exploitation of children charges and pleaded guilty in November 2025.

== 2012 election victory and resignation ==
After her election, media outlets reported that Laughton had in 2008 been sentenced to 7 1/2 to 15 years in prison for conspiracy to commit credit card fraud and 3 1/2 to seven years for falsifying physical evidence. The sentences ran concurrently and were later reduced to one year in the Belknap County Department of Corrections. She served four months before being released under the condition of 10 years of "good behavior."

Laughton did not disclose the conviction during her campaign, nor was she legally required to under the law. In New Hampshire, convicted felons are ineligible to hold public office until their "final discharge" from prison. Republicans believed the good behavior condition meant Laughton had not received a "final release"; however, prison officials consider the "final discharge" to be when the inmate exits incarceration. On November 27, 2012, Laughton issued a statement: "After a lot of thought and after talking with the state party chair and my Democratic caucus director, I've decided to resign my position of state representative-elect."

In December 2012, Laughton announced that she would run in the election to fill the seat she resigned from. However, later that month state Attorney General Michael Delaney (D) issued an opinion stating that since Laughton's sentence had been suspended on condition of "good behavior," she had not received a "final discharge" because she was still under the sentencing court's control until 2019. On January 2, 2013, Laughton abandoned her candidacy. While she would have faced a hearing before the state ballot law commission the next day, Delaney's opinion alone convinced her that she had no chance of staying on the ballot. The opinion led to her selectwoman's post being nullified.

== Bomb threat, return to politics and second resignation ==
Laughton turned herself in to police on March 12, 2015, after a warrant for her arrest was issued stemming from a bomb threat phoned in to Southern New Hampshire Medical Center on February 27. She was initially charged with making a false report of explosives. A judge reduced the charge to a misdemeanor and sentenced her to a six-month suspended jail term.

In 2019, Laughton paid $2,000 in restitution to be cleared to run for public office again and formed an exploratory committee in hopes of returning to city government. She ran for and won her former selectwoman seat in Nashua that year. In 2020, she once again ran for the New Hampshire House of Representatives, ultimately winning the seat. She was re-elected in 2022.

On November 12, 2022, Laughton was arrested and held in jail on a single stalking charge of violating a court order, prohibiting her from posting on Facebook about a woman. She faced up to nine months in jail due to her suspended sentence for texting 911 during non-emergencies. Amid the charges, Laughton resigned from the House on December 22.

== Child sex abuse images conviction ==
On June 22, 2023, Laughton was arrested and held in jail on preventive detention pending arraignment to four counts of distribution of child sex abuse images. On July 17, she was further charged with aiding and abetting in the sexual exploitation of children. On November 3, 2025, Laughton pleaded guilty to three counts of sexual exploitation of children and was scheduled to be sentenced on February 12, 2026. On June 18, 2026, following a delay in sentencing, she was sentenced to 33 years in prison for the three counts.

== See also ==
- List of transgender public officeholders in the United States
