= Springfield College (disambiguation) =

Springfield College in Springfield, Massachusetts, is the oldest institution by this name.

Springfield College or Springfield University may also refer to any of the following:

- Benedictine University at Springfield, defunct university formerly known as Springfield College in Illinois
- Drury University, originally Springfield College (1873-1874) and then Drury College (1872-2000), a liberal arts university in Springfield, Missouri
- Everest College (Missouri), formerly Springfield College, a defunct for-profit college in Springfield, Missouri
- Springfield Anglican College, an independent day school in Springfield, Queensland, Australia
- Springfield Technical Community College (STCC), also in Springfield, Massachusetts
- University of Illinois Springfield, a public university in Springfield Illinois
- Various institutions in the fictional town of Springfield on The Simpsons television show
