= 2020 Wheeling, West Virginia municipal election =

The 2020 Wheeling, West Virginia municipal election was held on June 9, 2020, to elect members of the city council and mayor.

== Background ==
On April 7, 2020, legislation was proposed at a virtual city council meeting to postpone Wheeling's municipal election from May 12 to June 9, to coincide with West Virginia's primary election.

== Mayor ==
Wheeling, West Virginia mayoral election
Party	Candidate	Votes	%	±%
Nonpartisan	Glenn Elliott	3,647	49.38%	
Nonpartisan	Chris Hamm	3,168	42.89%	
Nonpartisan	Tony Domenick	571	7.73%	
Total votes		7,386	100.00%	

== City council ==
=== Ward 1 ===
Ward 1 Wheeling, West Virginia city council election
Party	Candidate	Votes	%	±%
Nonpartisan	Chad Thalman	644	52.06%	
Nonpartisan	John Bishop	593	47.94%	
Total votes		1,237	100.00%	

=== Ward 2 ===
Ward 2 Wheeling, West Virginia city council election
Party	Candidate	Votes	%	±%
Nonpartisan	Ben Seidler	274	36.68%	
Nonpartisan	Joe Key	158	21.15%	
Nonpartisan	Ken Imer	123	16.47%	
Nonpartisan	Charles Ballouz	121	16.20%	
Nonpartisan	Alex Coogan	71	9.50%	
Total votes		747	100.00%	

=== Ward 3 ===
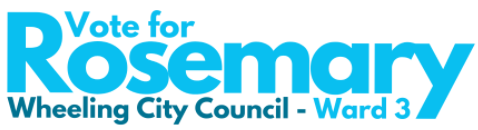
Rosemary Ketchum city council campaign logo

On July 12, 2019, Rosemary Ketchum announced that she would seek election to the Wheeling city council from Ward 3. On June 9, 2020, she won the election against Peggy Niebergall, Jerome Henry, and Erik Marple, becoming the first transgender person elected to political office in West Virginia. Following her victory she was praised by Annise Parker, the former Mayor of Houston, Texas, and congratulated by GLAAD.

Ward 3 Wheeling, West Virginia city council election
Party	Candidate	Votes	%	±%
Nonpartisan	Rosemary Ketchum	287	39.26%	
Nonpartisan	Peggy Niebergall	272	37.21%	
Nonpartisan	Jermone Henry	137	18.74%	
Nonpartisan	Erik Marple	35	4.79%	
Total votes		731	100.00%	

=== Ward 4 ===
Ward 4 Wheeling, West Virginia city council election
Party	Candidate	Votes	%	±%
Nonpartisan	Jerry Sklavounakis	812	53.35%	
Nonpartisan	Crissy Clutter	436	28.65%	
Nonpartisan	Jeff Knierim	274	18.00%	
Total votes		1,522	100.00%	

=== Ward 5 ===
Ward 5 Wheeling, West Virginia city council election
Party	Candidate	Votes	%	±%
Nonpartisan	Ty Thorngate	847	46.13%	
Nonpartisan	Phil Huffner	559	30.45%	
Nonpartisan	Travis McKinley	316	17.21%	
Nonpartisan	Brandon Criswell	114	6.21%	
Total votes		1,836	100.00%	

=== Ward 6 ===
Ward 6 Wheeling, West Virginia city council election
Party	Candidate	Votes	%	±%
Nonpartisan	Dave Palmer	1,114	100%	
Total votes		1,114	100.00%	
