= Matthew Pitaro =

American politician

Member of the New Hampshire House of Representatives from the Merrimack 11th district
- Incumbent
- Assumed office December 4, 2024
- Preceded by: Alisson Turcotte

Member of the New Hampshire House of Representatives from the Merrimack 22nd district
- In office December 2, 2020 – December 7, 2022
- Preceded by: Alisson Turcotte
- Succeeded by: Redrawn

Personal details
- Party: Republican
- Education: Manchester Community College; Plymouth State University; University of New Hampshire at Manchester; Southern New Hampshire University

Matthew Pitaro is an American politician. He served as a Republican member for the Merrimack 22nd district of the New Hampshire House of Representatives from 2020 to 2022 and has served in the 11th Merrimack district since December 2024.

== Life and career ==
Pitaro attended Manchester Community College, Plymouth State University, the University of New Hampshire at Manchester and Southern New Hampshire University.

In 2020, Pitaro defeated David Coolridge in the general election for the Merrimack 22nd district of the New Hampshire House of Representatives, winning 54 percent of the votes.

== See also ==
Matthew Pitaro on The New Hampshire House of Representatives Directory
