= SJ Howell =

American politician

Member of the Montana House of Representatives from the 100th district
- Incumbent
- Assumed office January 6, 2025
- Preceded by: Zooey Zephyr

Member of the Montana House of Representatives from the 95th district
- In office January 2, 2023 – January 4, 2025
- Preceded by: Danny Tenenbaum
- Succeeded by: Zooey Zephyr

Personal details
- Born: July 3, 1980 (age 46)
- Party: Democratic
- Education: University of Montana (BA)
- Website: Campaign website

SJ Howell (born July 3, 1980) is an American politician who became the first non-binary person to be elected to the state legislature in Montana. A member of the Democratic Party, they were elected in the 2022 election to the 95th district, representing Missoula in the 100th district in the Montana House of Representatives. They were sworn in as a representative on January 2, 2023. Due to redistricting, they ran for the 100th district in the 2024 Montana House of Representatives election.

Howell is also the executive director of Montana Women Vote, an organization that has the stated goal "to engage low-income women in the democratic process as informed voters, policy advocates, and community leaders."

As of 2026, they are the Minority Leader of the Montana House of Representatives.

== Career ==
SJ Howell has been the executive director of Montana Women Vote since 2013, and has been an activist and lobbyist for women and the LGBTQ+ community. In 2021, they lobbied and spoke publicly against bills that advocates for LGBTQ+ rights saw as discriminatory.

Howell announced their campaign to run for the 95th district in February 2022. Howell ran uncontested in the Democratic primary, and defeated the Republican nominee Lauren Subith by more than 2,000 votes in the general election. Subsequently, Howell and Zooey Zephyr became the first two openly transgender persons to ever be elected to the Montana Legislature.

=== 2023 legislative session ===
In January 2023, Howell introduced their first piece of legislation, House Bill 238, which would have expanded the eligibility requirements for Montana's Best Beginnings program, a child care scholarship program.

In April 2023, both Howell and Zooey Zephyr, a transgender woman member of the Montana House of Representatives, were criticized on the floor by Republican majority leader Sue Vinton for speaking against legislation that would have prohibited gender-affirming medical and surgical care for transgender minors. Zephyr was subsequently barred from speaking after her comments. After protests in support of Zephyr on April 24, Howell publicly expressed support for Zephyr. In response to comparisons made by Republican House Speaker Matt Regier between Howell and Zephyr, Howell rejected the role of "barometer of the trans community", saying that "I will not be the ‘good’ trans person" compared to Zephyr. After a group of House Republicans demanded Zephyr be censured, the House introduced a motion to ban Zephyr from the floor and other parts of the Capitol under the control of the House.

== Electoral history ==
2022 Montana's 95th House district election
| Party | Candidate | Votes | % |
|---|---|---|---|
| Democratic | SJ Howell | 3,117 | 74.96% |
| Republican | Lauren Subith | 905 | 21.77% |
| Libertarian | J. C. Windmueller | 136 | 3.27% |
| Total votes | | 4,158 | 100% |
| Democratic hold | | | |

2024 Montana's 100th House district election
| Party | Candidate | Votes | % |
|---|---|---|---|
| Democratic | SJ Howell | 4,440 | 77.70% |
| Republican | Christopher Paul Buckles | 1,274 | 22.30% |
| Total votes | | 5,714 | 100% |
| Democratic hold | | | |

2026 Montana's 100th House district election
| Party | Candidate | Votes | % |
|---|---|---|---|
| Democratic | SJ Howell | 2,070 | 87.19% |
| Republican | Michael Bowles | 286 | 12.05% |
| Libertarian | J. C. Windmueller | 18 | 0.76% |
| Total votes | | 2,374 | 100% |
| Democratic hold | | | |

== Personal life ==
Howell is non-binary and uses they/them pronouns.

== See also ==
- List of transgender public officeholders in the United States
