= Brion Curran =

American politician

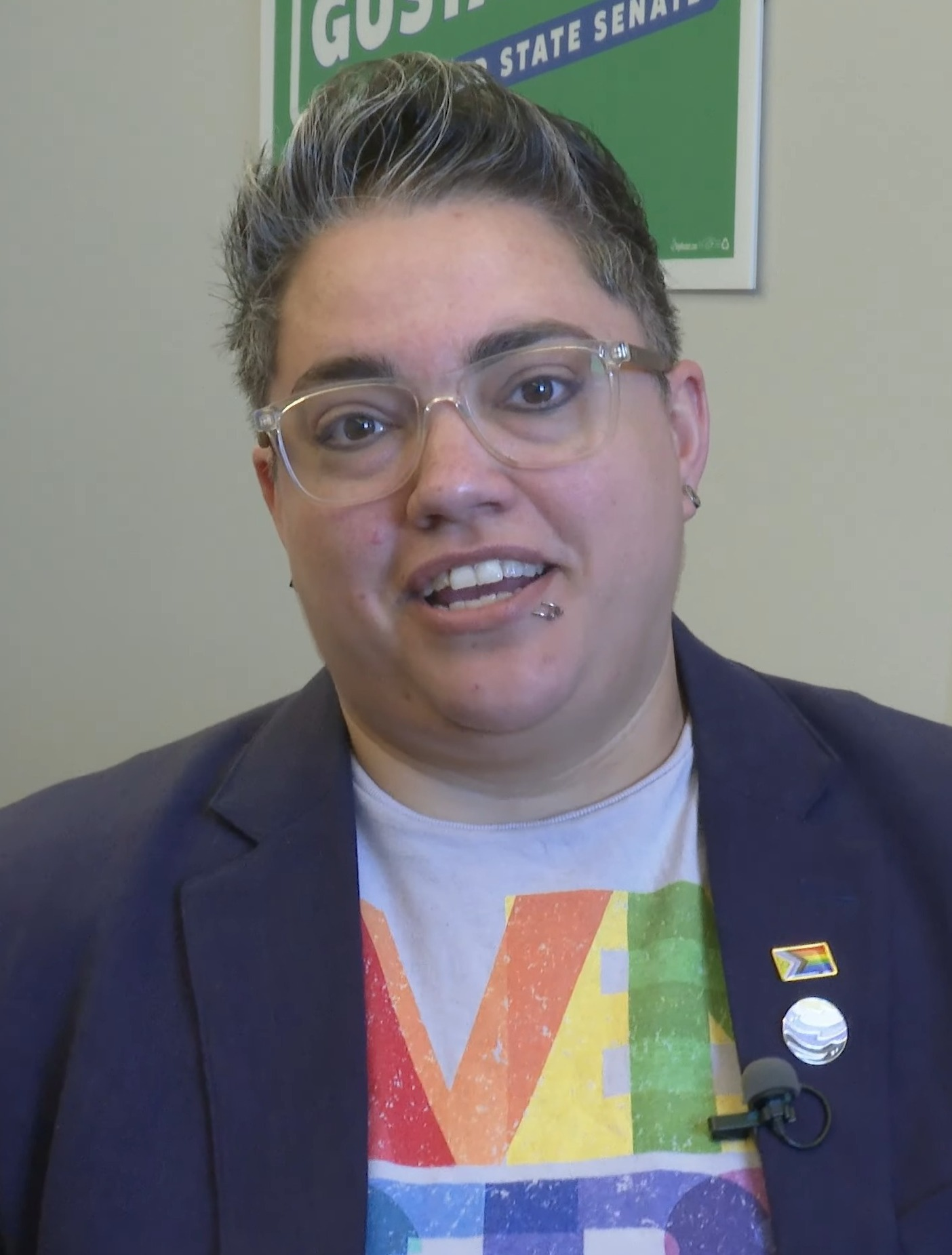
- Curran in 2023

Member of the Minnesota House of Representatives from the 36B district
- Incumbent
- Assumed office January 3, 2023
- Preceded by: Ami Wazlawik

Personal details
- Born: May 27, 1985 (age 41)
- Party: Democratic (DFL)
- Education: Century College (AAS); Concordia University, St. Paul (BS)
- Occupation: Social services; Legislator
- Website: Government website Campaign website

Brion Curran (/ˈbriːɒn ˈkʌrən/ BREE-on KURR-ən; born May 27, 1985) is an American politician serving in the Minnesota House of Representatives since 2023. A member of the Minnesota Democratic-Farmer-Labor Party (DFL), Curran represents District 36B in the north Twin Cities metropolitan area, which includes the cities of White Bear Lake and Vadnais Heights and parts of Ramsey and Washington Counties.

== Early life, education and career ==
Curran graduated from Centennial High School in Circle Pines, Minnesota. They earned an associate of applied sciences degree in law enforcement from Century College and a Bachelor of Science in criminal justice from Concordia University, St. Paul.

Curran has worked in disability services for 20 years. They joined the White Bear Lake Police Department, serving as a volunteer police sergeant and as a 911 dispatcher from 2015 to 2018. Curran served as a deputy in the Chisago County Sheriff's Office in 2018, quitting after responding to a traumatic incident and developing PTSD.

== Minnesota House of Representatives ==
Curran was elected to the Minnesota House of Representatives in 2022. They first ran after two-term DFL incumbent Ami Wazlawik announced she would not seek reelection.

Curran sits on the Human Services Policy, Judiciary Finance and Civil Law, and Public Safety Finance and Policy Committees, and served as vice chair of the Sustainable Infrastructure Policy Committee in 2023–2024. Curran is the vice chair of the Queer Caucus, a group of LGBTQ+ legislators that formed during the 2023 legislative session. In the 2025-26 session, they are also an assistant DFL floor leader.

=== Political positions ===
Curran supported legislation to ban the use of conversion therapy for minors and vulnerable adults in Minnesota, which passed the House in 2023. They have called the practice "abusive brainwashing", and spoke on the House floor about their experience with it, arguing that it does more harm than good.

A former deputy sheriff, Curran left the force in 2018 due to PTSD and has advocated for more mental health support funding for officers. They authored a bill that would prohibit courts from issuing or approving no-knock search warrants, saying it puts citizens and law enforcement at risk and violates the Fourth Amendment protection from unlawful searches and seizures. During the bill's hearing, the father of Amir Locke, who was killed during a no-knock warrant search in which Amir was not named, testified in support of the proposal.

Curran authored legislation creating a working group led by the Metropolitan Council that would work with municipalities in the Twin Cities East Metro struggling with managing drinking water services around White Bear Lake.

== Electoral history ==
2022 Minnesota State House - District 36B
Party	Candidate	Votes	%
Democratic (DFL)	Brion Curran	11,337	53.48
Republican	Heidi Gunderson	9,833	46.38
Write-in		29	0.14
Total votes		21,199	100.0
Democratic (DFL) hold			

2024 Minnesota State House - District 36B - DFL primary
Party	Candidate	Votes	%
Democratic (DFL)	Brion Curran (incumbent)	1,852	62.59
Democratic (DFL)	T.J. Malaskee	1,107	37.41
Total votes		2,959	100.0

2024 Minnesota State House - District 36B
Party	Candidate	Votes	%
Republican	Patty Bradway	12,152	48.29
Democratic (DFL)	Brion Curran (incumbent)	12,977	51.57
Write-in		37	0.15
Total votes		25,166	100.0
Democratic (DFL) hold			

== Personal life ==
Curran lives in Vadnais Heights, Minnesota. They identify as queer and nonbinary. According to public court records, Curran and their wife, Brandi, divorced in 2023.

=== Legal issues ===
On October 9, 2023, Curran was arrested on suspicion of driving while intoxicated (DWI) in Chisago County, Minnesota. They pleaded guilty to a misdemeanor charge of fourth-degree DWI in exchange for having other charges dismissed and served a two-day jail sentence in early 2024.
