= Thu Nguyen =

Vietnamese-born American politician

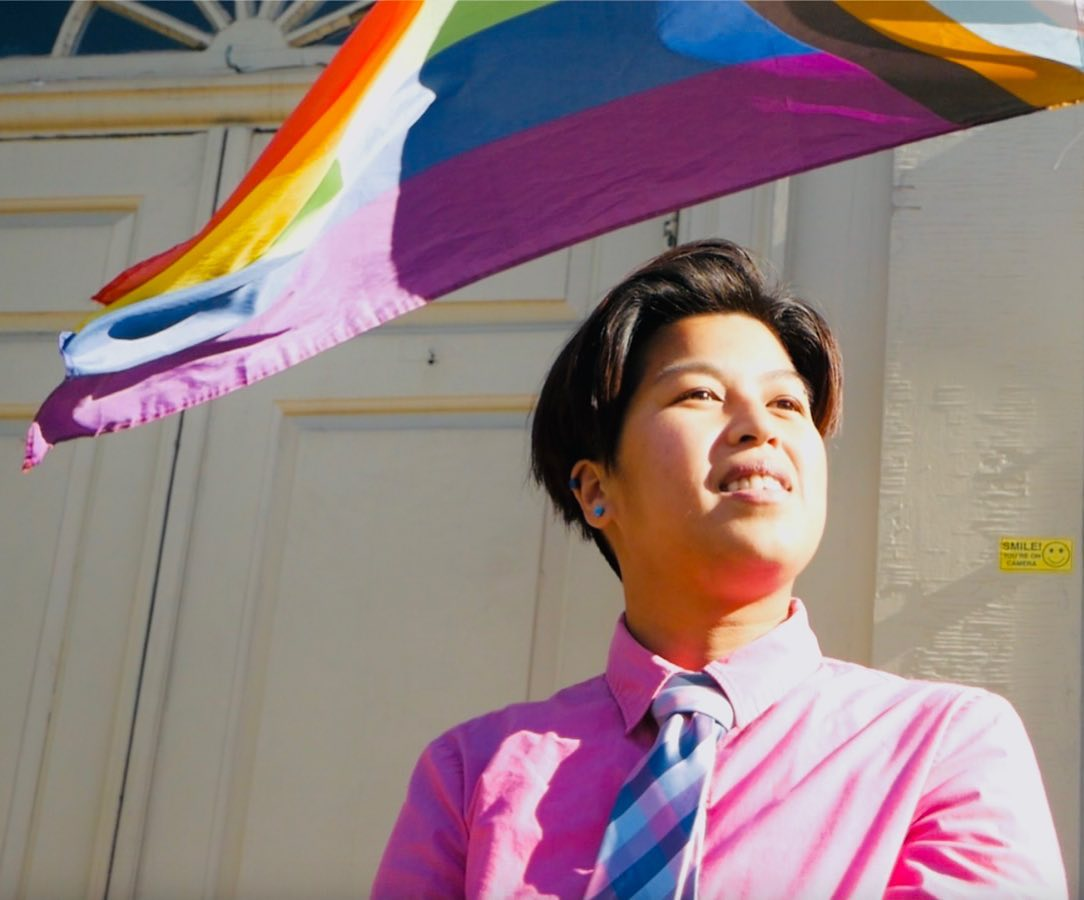

Member of the Worcester City Council at-large
- In office January 3, 2022 – January 3, 2026

Personal details
- Born: March 30, 1991 (age 35) Vietnam
- Party: Democratic
- Education: Clark University (BA)
- Website: Campaign website

Thu Nguyen (born 1991) is a Vietnamese-born American politician and community organizer who is a former member of the Worcester City Council, serving from 2022 to 2026. Nguyen is the first openly non-binary candidate elected to public office in Massachusetts history.

== Early life and education ==
Nguyen was born in Vietnam. Their father, a veteran who served in the Vietnam War, spent seven years as a prisoner of war, and subsequently sought asylum in Worcester, Massachusetts, where Nguyen, along with their family, immigrated to as refugees when they were one year old.

Growing up in poverty while attending Worcester Public Schools, they graduated from Clark University with a Bachelor of Arts degree in studio art and sociology.

== Career ==
Following their graduation from Clark, Nguyen founded a program focusing on helping to ensure that graduating students of Worcester's Claremont Academy could get into college. They are also the projects director for the Southeast Asian Coalition, "an organization that supports small businesses, promoting civic engagement and strengthening communities," and the founder of Worcester Mutual Aid, which, during the COVID-19 pandemic, raised almost $75,000 for struggling families.

On February 4, 2021, Nguyen announced their candidacy for an at-large seat on the Worcester City Council in a statement reading: "We need a Worcester that is safe and strong. As a youth worker, I know that when we invest in our young people with community-based programs, after-school activities, and youth jobs we can prevent violence and make us all safer." They were endorsed by a number of progressive organizations, including #VOTEPROCHOICE. They placed fourth in a field of 10 candidates in the November 2 election; by finishing within the top six, they were elected to the council, becoming its first Southeast Asian member, as well as, according to the LGBTQ Victory Fund, the first non-binary elected official in the history of Massachusetts. Following their victory, when asked about the issues they would prioritize once sworn in, they cited the need to address housing, expressing in particular their opposition to gentrification, and creating a more "honest, transparent and accessible government." They were sworn in on January 3, 2022.

On January 15, 2025, Nguyen released a statement saying they would be taking a month-long hiatus from their position as councilor due to alleged transphobia in the Worcester City Council. They mentioned being misgendered by Mayor Joseph Petty and council member Kathleen Toomey on the council floor as well as being referred to as "it" by council member Candy Mero-Carlson. They subsequently announced on March 4 that they would not be seeking re-election to the city council that year.

== Electoral history ==
2021 Worcester at-large City Council election
Candidate	Votes	%
Joseph M. Petty (incumbent)	8,805	13.00
Kate Toomey (incumbent)	7,976	11.78
Khrystian E. King (incumbent)	7,808	11.53
Thu Nguyen	7,374	10.89
Morris A. Bergman (incumbent)	7,344	10.84
Donna M. Colorio (incumbent)	7,285	10.76
Matthew E. Wally	6,664	9.84
Bill Coleman	5,448	8.04
Guillermo Creamer Jr.	5,271	7.78
Peter A. Stefan	3,758	5.55
blank votes	36,223	
