= New Hope, Texas =

- Town
- Location of New Hope in Collin County, Texas
- Coordinates: 33°12′42″N 96°33′49″W
- Country: United States
- State: Texas
- County: Collin

Government
  - Mayor: Andy Reitinger

Area
  - Total: 1.44 sq mi (3.73 km^{2})
  - Land: 1.43 sq mi (3.71 km^{2})
  - Water: 0.0077 sq mi (0.02 km^{2})
- Elevation: 617 ft (188 m)

Population (2020)
  - Total: 661
  - Density: 461/sq mi (178/km^{2})
- Time zone: UTC-6 (Central (CST))
  - Summer (DST): UTC-5 (CDT)
- Postal code: 75071
- FIPS code: 48-51036
- GNIS feature ID: 2413045
- Website: http://www.NewHopeTx.gov

New Hope is a town in Collin County, Texas, United States. The population was 661 at the 2020 census.

New Hope is a class B town and has an aldermanic form of government, under Texas general law. The mayor and five aldermen meet once a month on the last Tuesday of the month for town council meetings.

== Geography ==
According to the United States Census Bureau, the town has a total area of 1.7 square miles (4.4 km^{2}), all land.

== Demographics ==
Historical population
Census	Pop.	Note	%±
1980	331		—
1990	523		58.0%
2000	662		26.6%
2010	614		−7.3%
2020	661		7.7%
U.S. Decennial Census; 2020 Census

As of the census of 2000, 662 people, 230 households, and 201 families resided in the town. The population density was 460.7 inhabitants per square mile (177.9/km^{2}). The 243 housing units averaged 169.1 per square mile (65.2/km^{2}). The racial makeup of the town was 95.17% White, 0.15% African American, 0.76% Native American, 3.02% from other races, and 0.91% from two or more races. Hispanics or Latinos of any race were 5.74% of the population.

Of the 230 households, 34.3% had children under the age of 18 living with them, 79.6% were married couples living together, 5.7% had a female householder with no husband present, and 12.6% were not families. About 11.3% of all households were made up of individuals, and 6.1% had someone living alone who was 65 years of age or older. The average household size was 2.88 and the average family size was 3.09.

In the town, the population was distributed as 25.4% under the age of 18, 7.3% from 18 to 24, 27.2% from 25 to 44, 29.3% from 45 to 64, and 10.9% who were 65 years of age or older. The median age was 41 years. For every 100 females, there were 107.5 males. For every 100 females age 18 and over, there were 103.3 males.

The median income for a household in the town was $66,563, and the median income for a family was $67,083. Males had a median income of $42,188 versus $30,795 for females. The per capita income for the town was $24,542. About 1.4% of families and 2.7% of the population were below the poverty line, including 1.7% of those under age 18 and 1.4% of those age 65 or over.
