= List of LGBTQ politicians in the United States =

This is an alphabetical list of openly lesbian, gay, bisexual, and transgender politicians who have held office in the United States. Historical figures are included only if there is documented evidence of an open queer identity.

Most openly LGBT politicians in the U.S. are part of the Democratic Party, which has taken a more favorable stance than Republicans towards LGBT rights.

== Federal ==
=== Federal Executive ===
The officials below held a United States Senate-confirmed position, were the principal leading a White House Office or Assistant to the President ranking staffer, or an equivalent agency role (including in an acting capacity). It does not include staffers below these levels.

Name	President(s)	Start	End	Office(s)	Notes
James Abbott	Donald Trump (2017–2021)	2017	2022	Member of the Federal Labor Relations Authority (2017–2022)	
Christine Abizaid	Joe Biden (2021–2025)	2021	2024	Director of the National Counterterrorism Center (2021–2024)	First female and first openly gay director of the National Counterterrorism Center.
Roberta Achtenberg	Bill Clinton (1993–2001)	1993	1995	Assistant Secretary of Housing and Urban Development for Fair Housing and Equal Opportunity (1993–1995)	First Senate-confirmed openly LGBT person.
Dan Baer	Barack Obama (2009–2017)	2013	2017	Ambassador to the Organization for Security and Cooperation in Europe (2013–2017)	
Shalanda Baker	Joe Biden (2021–2025)	2022	2024	Director of the Office of Economic Impact and Diversity (2022–2024)	
Anthony Bernal	Joe Biden (2021–2025)	2022	2025	Chief of Staff to the First Lady (2022–2025)	
Jeremy Bernard	Barack Obama (2009–2017)	2011	2015	White House Social Secretary (2011–2015)	
John Berry	Barack Obama (2009–2017)	2009	2016	Director of the Office of Personnel Management (2009–2013); Ambassador to Australia (2013–2016)	First out head of a federal agency
Randy Berry	Barack Obama (2009–2017)	2015	2024	Special Envoy for the Human Rights of LGBTI Persons (2015–2017); Ambassador to Nepal (2018–2022); Ambassador to Namibia (2023–2024)	First Special Envoy for the Human Rights of LGBTI Persons
Randy Berry	Donald Trump (2017–2021)	2015	2024	Ambassador to Nepal (2018–2022); Ambassador to Namibia (2023–2024)	First Special Envoy for the Human Rights of LGBTI Persons
Randy Berry	Joe Biden (2021–2025)	2015	2024	Ambassador to Nepal (2018–2022); Ambassador to Namibia (2023–2024)	First Special Envoy for the Human Rights of LGBTI Persons
Scott Bessent	Donald Trump (2025–present)	2025	present	Secretary of the Treasury (2025–present); Acting Director of the Consumer Financial Protection Bureau (2025); Acting Commissioner of Internal Revenue (2025–2026)	Highest ranking LGBTQ government official to date.
Raphael Bostic	Barack Obama (2009–2017)	2009	2012	Assistant Secretary of Housing and Urban Development for Policy Development and Research (2009–2012)	
Michael Botticelli	Barack Obama (2009–2017)	2014	2017	Acting Director of the Office of National Drug Control Policy (2014–2015); Director of the Office of National Drug Control Policy (2015–2017)	First openly LGBT official paid at Level I of the Executive Schedule.
Wally Brewster	Barack Obama (2009–2017)	2013	2017	Ambassador to the Dominican Republic (2013–2017)	
Tammy Bruce	Donald Trump (2025–present)	2025	present	Spokesperson of the Department of State (2025); Deputy Ambassador to the United Nations (2025–present)	
Pete Buttigieg	Joe Biden (2021–2025)	2021	2025	Secretary of Transportation (2021–2025)	First openly gay Cabinet Secretary
Michael Camuñez	Barack Obama (2009–2017)	2010	2013	Assistant Secretary of Commerce for Market Access and Compliance (2010–2013)	
Pia Carusone	Barack Obama (2009–2017)	2013	2014	Assistant Secretary of Homeland Security for Public Affairs (2013–2014)	
Midge Costanza	Jimmy Carter (1977–1981)	1977	1978	Director of the White House Office of Public Liaison (1977–1978)	Closeted while in government.
James Costos	Barack Obama (2009–2017)	2013	2017	Ambassador to Spain (2013–2017); Ambassador to Andorra (2014–2017)	
Jeff Daigle	Donald Trump (2017–2021)	2019	2024	Ambassador to Cape Verde (2019–2024)	
Jeff Daigle	Joe Biden (2021–2025)	2019	2024	Ambassador to Cape Verde (2019–2024)	
Stuart Delery	Barack Obama (2009–2017)	2012	2016	Assistant Attorney General for the Civil Division (2012–2016); Acting Associate Attorney General (2014–2016)	
Stuart Delery	Joe Biden (2021–2025)	2022	2023	White House Counsel (2022–2023)	
Todd Dickinson	Bill Clinton (1993–2001)	1999	2001	Acting Director of the Patent and Trademark Office (1999); Director of the Patent and Trademark Office (1999–2001)	
Laura Duffy	Barack Obama (2009–2017)	2010	2017	U.S. Attorney for the Southern District of California (2010–2017)	
Jenny Durkan	Barack Obama (2009–2017)	2009	2014	U.S. Attorney for the Western District of Washington (2009–2014)	
Mark Dybul	George W. Bush (2001–2009)	2006	2009	Acting Global AIDS Coordinator (2006); Global AIDS Coordinator (2006–2009)	
John Easton	Barack Obama (2009–2017)	2009	2014	Director of the Institute of Education Sciences (2009–2014)	
Carlos Elizondo	Joe Biden (2021–2025)	2021	2025	White House Social Secretary (2021–2025)	
Joseph Falk	Joe Biden (2021–2025)	2023	2025	Member of the Institute of Peace (2023–2025)	
Joseph Falk	Donald Trump (2017–2021)	2023	2025	Member of the Institute of Peace (2023–2025)	
Eric Fanning	Barack Obama (2009–2017)	2013	2017	Under Secretary of the Air Force (2013–2015); Acting Secretary of the Air Force (2013); Acting Under Secretary of the Army (2015); Secretary of the Army (2016–2017)	First openly LGBTQ Secretary of the Army
Chai Feldblum	Barack Obama (2009–2017)	2010	2018	Commissioner of the Equal Employment Opportunity Commission (2010–2018)	
Chai Feldblum	Donald Trump (2017–2021)	2010	2018	Commissioner of the Equal Employment Opportunity Commission (2010–2018)	
Art Fisher	Donald Trump (2025–present)	2025	present	Ambassador to Austria (2025–present)	
Sue Fulton	Joe Biden (2021–2025)	2022	2024	Assistant Secretary of Veterans Affairs for Public and Intergovernmental Affairs (2022–2024)	
Rufus Gifford	Barack Obama (2009–2017)	2013	2017	Ambassador to Denmark (2013–2017)	
Rufus Gifford	Joe Biden (2021–2025)	2022	2023	Chief of Protocol of the United States (2022–2023)	
Bob Gilchrist	Donald Trump (2017–2021)	2020	2023	Ambassador to Lithuania (2020–2023)	
Bob Gilchrist	Joe Biden (2021–2025)	2020	2023	Ambassador to Lithuania (2020–2023)	
David Glawe	Donald Trump (2017–2021)	2017	2020	Under Secretary of Homeland Security for Intelligence and Analysis (2017–2020)	
Tyler Goodspeed	Donald Trump (2017–2021)	2020	2021	Acting Chair of the Council of Economic Advisers (2020–2021)	
Dan Gordon	Barack Obama (2009–2017)	2009	2011	Administrator of the Office of Federal Procurement Policy (2009–2011)	
Bob Gray	Dwight D. Eisenhower (1953–1961)	1957	1961	White House Appointments Secretary (1957–1958); White House Cabinet Secretary (1958–1961)	Posthumously identified as queer.
Solomon Greene	Joe Biden (2021–2025)	2022	2025	Acting Assistant Secretary of Housing and Urban Development for Policy Development and Research (2022–2025)	
Kathy Greenlee	Barack Obama (2009–2017)	2009	2016	Assistant Secretary of Health and Human Services for Aging (2009–2016)	
Ric Grenell	Donald Trump (2017–2021)	2018	2021	Ambassador to Germany (2018–2020); Special Presidential Envoy for Serbia and Kosovo Peace Negotiations (2019–2021); Acting Director of National Intelligence (2020)	
Ric Grenell	Donald Trump (2025–present)	2025	present	Special Presidential Envoy for Special Missions (2025–present)	
Michael Guest	George W. Bush (2001–2009)	2001	2004	Ambassador to Romania (2001–2004)	
David Hansell	Barack Obama (2009–2017)	2009	2011	Acting Assistant Secretary of Health and Human Services for Children and Families (2009–2011)	
Aditi Hardikar	Joe Biden (2021–2025)	2024	2025	Acting Assistant Secretary of the Treasury for Management (2024–2025)	
Todd Harper	Donald Trump (2017–2021)	2019	2025	Member of the National Credit Union Administration (2019–2025); Chair of the National Credit Union Administration (2021–2025)	
Todd Harper	Joe Biden (2021–2025)	2019	2025	Member of the National Credit Union Administration (2019–2025); Chair of the National Credit Union Administration (2021–2025)	
Todd Harper	Donald Trump (2025–present)	2019	2025	Member of the National Credit Union Administration (2019–2025); Chair of the National Credit Union Administration (2021–2025)	
Cathy Harris	Joe Biden (2021–2025)	2022	2025	Member of the Merit Systems Protection Board (2022–2025); Chair of the Merit Systems Protection Board (2024–2025)	
Cathy Harris	Donald Trump (2025–present)	2022	2025	Member of the Merit Systems Protection Board (2022–2025); Chair of the Merit Systems Protection Board (2024–2025)	
Jacob Helberg	Donald Trump (2025–present)	2025	present	Under Secretary of State for Economic Affairs (2025–present)	
Israel Hernandez	George W. Bush (2001–2009)	2005	2009	Assistant Secretary of Commerce for International Trade and Promotion and Director General of the United States Commercial Service (2005–2009)	
Fred Hochberg	Bill Clinton (1993–2001)	1998	2001	Deputy Administrator of the Small Business Administration (1998–2001)	
Fred Hochberg	Barack Obama (2009–2017)	2009	2017	President of the Export-Import Bank (2009–2017)	
Robert Holleyman	Barack Obama (2009–2017)	2014	2017	Deputy Trade Representative (2014–2017)	
Jim Hormel	Bill Clinton (1993–2001)	1999	2001	Ambassador to Luxembourg (1999–2001)	First openly LGBTQ ambassador for the United States
David Huebner	Barack Obama (2009–2017)	2009	2014	Ambassador to New Zealand (2009–2014); Ambassador to Samoa (2010–2014)	
Michael Hughes	Barack Obama (2009–2017)	2011	2018	U.S. Marshal for the District of Columbia Superior Court (2010–2018)	
Michael Hughes	Donald Trump (2017–2021)	2011	2018	U.S. Marshal for the District of Columbia Superior Court (2010–2018)	
Pamela Hyde	Barack Obama (2009–2017)	2009	2015	Administrator of the Substance Abuse and Mental Health Services Administration (2009–2015)	
Candice Jackson	Donald Trump (2017–2021)	2017	2018	Acting Assistant Secretary of Education for Civil Rights (2017–2018)	
Karine Jean-Pierre	Joe Biden (2021–2025)	2022	2025	White House Press Secretary (2022–2025)	
Walter Jenkins	Lyndon B. Johnson (1963–1969)	1963	1964	De facto White House Chief of Staff (1963–1964)	Outed and left government.
Kristina Johnson	Barack Obama (2009–2017)	2009	2010	Under Secretary of Energy for Energy and Environment (2009–2010)	
Elaine Kaplan	Barack Obama (2009–2017)	2013	2013	Acting Director of the Office of Personnel Management (2013)	
Kody Kinsley	Barack Obama (2009–2017)	2016	2018	Assistant Secretary of the Treasury for Management (2016–2018)	
Kody Kinsley	Donald Trump (2017–2021)	2016	2018	Assistant Secretary of the Treasury for Management (2016–2018)	
Kei Koizumi	Joe Biden (2021–2025)	2021	2021	Acting Director of the Office of Science and Technology Policy (2021)	
Jed Kolko	Joe Biden (2021–2025)	2022	2024	Under Secretary of Commerce for Economic Affairs (2022–2024)	
Ben LaBolt	Joe Biden (2021–2025)	2023	2025	White House Communications Director (2023–2025)	
Christopher Lamora	Joe Biden (2021–2025)	2022	2026	Ambassador to Cameroon (2022–2026)	
Christopher Lamora	Donald Trump (2025–present)	2022	2026	Ambassador to Cameroon (2022–2026)	
Bruce Lehman	Bill Clinton (1993–2001)	1993	1998	Director of the Patent and Trademark Office (1993–1998); Acting Chair of the National Endowment for the Humanities (1997)	First Senate-confirmed openly LGBT man.
Rachel Levine	Joe Biden (2021–2025)	2021	2025	Assistant Secretary of Health and Human Services for Health (2021–2025)	First Senate-confirmed openly trans appointee.
Sharon Lubinski	Barack Obama (2009–2017)	2010	2016	U.S. Marshal for the District of Minnesota (2010–2016)	
Sean Maloney	Bill Clinton (1993–2001)	1999	2000	White House Staff Secretary (1999–2000)	
Sean Maloney	Joe Biden (2021–2025)	2024	2025	Ambassador to the Organisation for Economic Co-operation and Development (2024–2025)	
Demetrios Marantis	Barack Obama (2009–2017)	2009	2013	Deputy Trade Representative (2009–2013); Acting Trade Representative (2013)	First openly gay acting member of the United States Cabinet.
Jeff Marootian	Barack Obama (2009–2017)	2015	2017	Assistant Secretary of Transportation for Administration (2015–2017)	
Jeff Marootian	Joe Biden (2021–2025)	2022	2025	Acting Assistant Secretary of Energy Efficiency and Renewable Energy (2021–2025)	
Mercedes Márquez	Barack Obama (2009–2017)	2009	2012	Assistant Secretary of Housing and Urban Development for Community Planning and Development (2009–2012)	
Kathy Martinez	Barack Obama (2009–2017)	2009	2015	Assistant Secretary of Labor for Disability Employment Policy (2009–2015)	
Philip McNamara	Barack Obama (2009–2017)	2013	2017	Assistant Secretary of Homeland Security for Intergovernmental Affairs (2013–2015); Assistant Secretary of Homeland Security for Partnerships and Engagement (2015–2017)	
Philip McNamara	Joe Biden (2021–2025)	2021	2025	Assistant Secretary of Transportation for Administration (2021–2025)	
Ken Mehlman	George W. Bush (2001–2009)	2001	2003	White House Director of Political Affairs (2001–2003)	Came out after leaving government.
Mike Michaud	Barack Obama (2009–2017)	2015	2017	Assistant Secretary of Labor for Veterans' Employment and Training (2015–2017)	
Vince Micone	Donald Trump (2025–present)	2025	2025	Acting Secretary of Labor (2025)	
Scott Miller	Joe Biden (2021–2025)	2022	2025	Ambassador to Switzerland (2022–2025); Ambassador to Liechtenstein (2022–2025)	
David Mills	Barack Obama (2009–2017)	2010	2017	Assistant Secretary of Commerce for Export Enforcement (2010–2017)	
Eric Nelson	Barack Obama (2009–2017)	2013	2013	Acting Ambassador to Costa Rica (2013)	
Eric Nelson	Donald Trump (2017–2021)	2019	2022	Ambassador to Bosnia and Herzegovina (2019–2022)	
Eric Nelson	Joe Biden (2021–2025)	2019	2022	Ambassador to Bosnia and Herzegovina (2019–2022)	
Christina Nolan	Donald Trump (2017–2021)	2017	2021	U.S. Attorney for the District of Vermont (2017–2021)	
Christina Nolan	Joe Biden (2021–2025)	2017	2021	U.S. Attorney for the District of Vermont (2017–2021)	
Gina Ortiz Jones	Joe Biden (2021–2025)	2021	2023	Under Secretary of the Air Force (2021–2023)	
Ted Osius	Barack Obama (2009–2017)	2014	2017	Ambassador to Vietnam (2014–2017)	
Ted Osius	Donald Trump (2017–2021)	2014	2017	Ambassador to Vietnam (2014–2017)	
Marc Ostfield	Joe Biden (2021–2025)	2022	2025	Ambassador to Paraguay (2022–2025)	
Raúl Perea-Henze	Barack Obama (2009–2017)	2010	2013	Assistant Secretary of Veterans Affairs for Policy and Planning (2010–2013)	
Robert Pitman	Barack Obama (2009–2017)	2011	2014	U.S. Attorney for the Western District of Texas (2011–2014)	
Dean Pittman	Barack Obama (2009–2017)	2014	2019	Ambassador to Mozambique (2014–2019)	
Dean Pittman	Donald Trump (2017–2021)	2014	2019	Ambassador to Mozambique (2014–2019)	
David Pressman	Barack Obama (2009–2017)	2009	2017	Assistant Secretary of Homeland Security for Policy Development (2009–2010); Ambassador to the United Nations for Special Political Affairs (2014–2017)	
David Pressman	Joe Biden (2021–2025)	2022	2025	Ambassador to Hungary (2022–2025)	
Ned Price	Joe Biden (2021–2025)	2021	2023	Spokesperson of the Department of State (2021–2023)	
Gautam Raghavan	Joe Biden (2021–2025)	2022	2025	Director of the White House Presidential Personnel Office (2022–2025)	
Erik Ramanathan	Joe Biden (2021–2025)	2022	2025	Ambassador to Sweden (2022–2025)	
Christy Romero	Barack Obama (2009–2017)	2011	2025	Acting Special Inspector General of the Troubled Asset Relief Program (2011–2012); Special Inspector General of the Troubled Asset Relief Program (2012–2022); Commissioner of the Commodity Futures Trading Commission (2022–2025)	
Christy Romero	Donald Trump (2017–2021)	2011	2025	Acting Special Inspector General of the Troubled Asset Relief Program (2011–2012); Special Inspector General of the Troubled Asset Relief Program (2012–2022); Commissioner of the Commodity Futures Trading Commission (2022–2025)	
Christy Romero	Joe Biden (2021–2025)	2011	2025	Acting Special Inspector General of the Troubled Asset Relief Program (2011–2012); Special Inspector General of the Troubled Asset Relief Program (2012–2022); Commissioner of the Commodity Futures Trading Commission (2022–2025)	
Emmy Ruiz	Joe Biden (2021–2025)	2021	2025	White House Director of Political Strategy and Outreach (2021–2025)	
Ellie Schafer	Barack Obama (2009–2017)	2010	2016	Director of the White House Visitors Office (2009–2016)	
George Sheldon	Barack Obama (2009–2017)	2011	2013	Acting Assistant Secretary of Health and Human Services for Children and Families (2011–2013)	
Shawn Skelly	Joe Biden (2021–2025)	2021	2025	Assistant Secretary of Defense for Readiness (2021–2025); Acting Deputy Under Secretary of Defense for Personnel and Readiness (2023–2025)	Highest ranking trans appointee.
Hanscom Smith	Donald Trump (2017–2021)	2019	2022	Consul General to Hong Kong and Macau (2019–2022) (Note: The Consul General to Hong Kong and Macau is a chief of mission.)	
Hanscom Smith	Joe Biden (2021–2025)	2019	2022	Consul General to Hong Kong and Macau (2019–2022)	
Megan Smith	Barack Obama (2009–2017)	2014	2017	Chief Technology Officer (2014–2017)	
Michael Smith	Joe Biden (2021–2025)	2021	2025	CEO of AmeriCorps (2021–2025)	
Richard Sorian	Barack Obama (2009–2017)	2010	2011	Assistant Secretary of Health and Human Services for Public Affairs (2010–2011)	
Jessica Stern	Joe Biden (2021–2025)	2021	2025	Special Envoy for the Human Rights of LGBTI Persons (2021–2025)	
Nancy Sutley	Barack Obama (2009–2017)	2009	2014	Chair of the Council on Environmental Quality (2009–2014)	
Arlando Teller	Joe Biden (2021–2025)	2023	2025	Assistant Secretary of Transportation for Tribal Government Affairs (2023–2025)	
Anne Tompkins	Barack Obama (2009–2017)	2010	2015	U.S. Attorney for the Western District of North Carolina (2010–2015)	
Jeff Trandahl	Bill Clinton (1993–2001)	1996	2005	Acting Chief Administrative Officer of the House of Representatives (1996–1997); Clerk of the House of Representatives (1999–2005)	
Jeff Trandahl	George W. Bush (2001–2009)	1996	2005	Acting Chief Administrative Officer of the House of Representatives (1996–1997); Clerk of the House of Representatives (1999–2005)	
Carlos Uriarte	Joe Biden (2021–2025)	2022	2025	Assistant Attorney General for Legislative Affairs (2022–2025)	
Arthur Vandenberg	Dwight D. Eisenhower (1953–1961)	1953	1953	White House Appointments Secretary (1953)	Outed and left government.
Alex Wagner	Joe Biden (2021–2025)	2022	2025	Assistant Secretary of the Air Force for Manpower and Reserve Affairs (2022–2025)	
Sumner Welles	Franklin D. Roosevelt (1933–1945)	1933	1943	Assistant Secretary of State for Latin American Affairs (1933); Ambassador to Belgium (1933); Assistant Secretary of State for Latin American Affairs (1933–1937); Under Secretary of State (1937–1943)	Outed and left government.
Bill White	Donald Trump (2025–present)	2025	present	Ambassador to Belgium (2025–present)	
Kayla Williams	Joe Biden (2021–2025)	2021	2022	Assistant Secretary of Veterans Affairs for Public and Intergovernmental Affairs (2021–2022)	
Douglas Wilson	Barack Obama (2009–2017)	2010	2012	Assistant Secretary of Defense for Public Affairs (2010–2012)	
Harris Wofford	Bill Clinton (1993–2001)	1995	2001	CEO of AmeriCorps (1995–2001)	Came out after leaving government.
Chantale Wong	Joe Biden (2021–2025)	2022	2025	U.S. Director of the Asian Development Bank (2022–2025)	
Michael Yudin	Barack Obama (2009–2017)	2012	2016	Acting Assistant Secretary of Education for Special Education and Rehabilitative Services (2012–2015); Assistant Secretary of Education for Special Education and Rehabilitative Services (2015–2016)	

== State ==
=== State Executive ===
The below held a state executive/constitutional office or board, or were appointed as the principal of a statewide agency.

Name	Party	State / Territory	Start	End	Office(s)	Type	Notes
Kim Ahern	Democratic	Rhode Island	2027	Elect	Attorney General of Rhode Island (elect)	Elected	
Henry Beck	Democratic	Maine	2019	2025	Treasurer of Maine (2019–2025)	Appointed	
Kate Brown	Democratic	Oregon	2009	2023	Secretary of State of Oregon (2009–2015); Governor of Oregon (2015–2023)	Elected	First openly bisexual person to be elected secretary of state in American history and Oregon's first out LGBTQ constitutional officer. Succeeded to the governor's office upon the resignation of John Kitzhaber (D); subsequently elected in her own right in 2016. Brown is thus the first openly LGBTQ person to be elected governor in the U.S.
Andrew Bruck	Democratic	New Jersey	2021	2022	Acting Attorney General of New Jersey (2021–2022)	Appointed	
Karen Burstein	Democratic	New York	1983	1987	Chair of the Civil Service Commission of New York (2019–2025)	Appointed	
Beth Bye	Democratic	Connecticut	2019	2025	Early Childhood Commissioner of Connecticut	Appointed	
Allister Chang	Democratic	District of Columbia	2021	present	Board of Education of the District of Columbia (2021–present)	Elected	
Benjamin Cruz	Democratic	Guam	2018	present	Auditor of Guam (2018–present)	Elected	Previously served as an Associate Justice and later Chief Justice of the Guam Supreme Court
Eileen Duff	Democratic	Massachusetts	2013	2025	Governor's Council of Massachusetts (2013–2025)	Elected	
Ed Flanagan	Democratic	Vermont	1993	2001	Auditor of Vermont (1993–2001)	Elected	First openly LGBT person elected statewide in American history.
Jamie Fox	Democratic	New Jersey	2002	2003	Transportation Commissioner of New Jersey (2002–2003, 2014–2015)	Appointed	
Jamie Fox	Democratic	New Jersey	2014	2015	Transportation Commissioner of New Jersey (2002–2003, 2014–2015)	Appointed	
Sue Fulton	Democratic	New Jersey	2018	2022	Chair of the Motor Vehicle Commission of New Jersey (2018–2022)	Appointed	
Hazel Gluck	Republican	New Jersey	1982	1989	Lottery Commissioner of New Jersey (1982–1985); Insurance Commissioner of New Jersey (1985–1986); Transportation Commissioner of New Jersey (1986–1989)	Appointed	Came out after leaving government.
Amanda Gonzalez	Democratic	Colorado	2027	Elect	Secretary of State of Colorado (elect)	Elected	
Dan Grabauskas	Republican	Massachusetts	2003	2009	Transportation Secretary of Massachusetts (2003–2005); General Manager of the Massachusetts Bay Transportation Authority (2005–2009)	Appointed	
Jim Gray	Democratic	Kentucky	2019	2026	Transportation Secretary of Kentucky (2019–2026)	Appointed	
Kathy Greenlee	Democratic	Kansas	2006	2009	Aging Secretary of Kansas (2009–2016)	Appointed	
James Hammond	Democratic	South Carolina	1842	1844	Governor of South Carolina (1842–1844)	Elected	Posthumously outed when letters of a sexual relationship between Hammond and Thomas Withers were published.
Maura Healey	Democratic	Massachusetts	2015	present	Attorney General of Massachusetts (2015–2023); Governor of Massachusetts (2023–present)	Elected	First out Attorney General elected at state level First out Governor of Massachusetts
Elaine Howle	Independent	California	2001	2021	Auditor of California (2001–2021)	Appointed	First woman and first out lesbian appointed California state auditor; longest-serving state auditor in California's history
Kim Iwamoto	Democratic	Hawaii	2006	2011	Board of Education of Hawaii (2006–2011)	Elected	First openly transgender person to win a statewide office
Jack Jacobson	Democratic	District of Columbia	2013	2021	Board of Education of the District of Columbia (2013–2021)	Elected	
Denise Juneau	Democratic	Montana	2009	2017	Superintendent of Montana (2009–2017)	Elected	
Kody Kinsley	Democratic	North Carolina	2022	2025	Health Secretary of North Carolina (2022–2025)	Appointed	
Tina Kotek	Democratic	Oregon	2023	present	Governor of Oregon (2023–present)	Elected	First LGBTQ person to succeed another LGBTQ person (Kate Brown) as Governor.
John Laird	Democratic	California	2011	2019	Natural Resources Secretary of California (2011–2019)	Appointed	
Ricardo Lara	Democratic	California	2019	2027	Insurance Commissioner of California (2019–2027)	Elected	First out state Insurance Commissioner
Kevin Lembo	Democratic	Connecticut	2011	2021	Comptroller of Connecticut (2011–2021)	Elected	
Rachel Levine	Democratic	Pennsylvania	2017	2021	Health Secretary of Pennsylvania (2017–2021)	Appointed	
Davante Lewis	Democratic	Louisiana	2022	present	Public Service Commission of Louisiana (2022–present)	Elected	Lewis is the first out elected at the state level in Louisiana.
Anne Lopez	Democratic	Hawaii	2022	present	Acting Attorney General of Hawaii (2022–2023); Attorney General of Hawaii (2023–present	Appointed	
Kris Mayes	Republican	Arizona	2003	2010	Corporation Commission of Arizona (2003–2010)	Elected	First out Attorney General of Arizona
Kris Mayes	Democratic	Arizona	2023	present	Attorney General of Arizona (2023–present)	Elected	First out Attorney General of Arizona
Dale McCormick	Democratic	Maine	1997	2005	Treasurer of Maine (1997–2005)	Appointed	First openly LGBTQ state treasurer (elected by state legislature) and Maine's first openly LGBTQ Constitutional officer
Jim McGreevey	Democratic	New Jersey	2002	2004	Governor of New Jersey (2002–2004)	Elected	Came out in the same speech as his resignation First openly gay governor
Tony Miller	Democratic	California	1994	1995	Secretary of State of California (1994–1995)	Elected (Note: Appointed to an elected office)	First openly LGBTQ Secretary of State
Terry Mutchler	Democratic	Pennsylvania	2008	2015	Executive Director of the Office of Open Records of Pennsylvania (2008–2015)	Appointed	
Dana Nessel	Democratic	Michigan	2019	2027	Attorney General of Michigan (2019–2027)	Elected	First out Attorney General of Michigan; First openly LGBT person elected to statewide office in Michigan
Chris Pappas	Democratic	New Hampshire	2013	2019	Executive Council of New Hampshire (2013–2019)	Elected	
Mike Pieciak	Democratic	Vermont	2023	present	Treasurer of Vermont (2023–present)	Elected	
Jared Polis	Democratic	Colorado	2001	2007	Board of Education of Colorado (2001–2007)	Elected	First openly gay man to be elected governor in the U.S.
Jared Polis	Democratic	Colorado	2019	2027	Governor of Colorado (2019–2027); Chair of the National Governors Association (2024–2025)	Elected	First openly gay man to be elected governor in the U.S.
Sarah Reale	Democratic	Utah	2023	present	Board of Education of Utah (2023–present)	Elected	
Jim Roth	Democratic	Oklahoma	2007	2009	Corporation Commission of Oklahoma (2007–2009)	Elected	
Erick Russell	Democratic	Connecticut	2023	present	Treasurer of Connecticut (2023–present)	Elected	First openly gay Black man to be elected to statewide office in the U.S.
George Sheldon	Democratic	Florida	2008	2011	Children and Families Secretary of Florida (2008–2011)	Appointed	
George Sheldon	Democratic	Illinois	2015	2017	Children and Families Secretary of Illinois (2015–2017)	Appointed	
Mark Sickles	Democratic	Virginia	2026	present	Finance Secretary of Virginia (2026–present)	Appointed	
Brett Smiley	Democratic	Rhode Island	2019	2021	Administration Director of Rhode Island (2019–2021)	Appointed	
Elizabeth Steiner	Democratic	Oregon	2025	present	Treasurer of Oregon (2025–present)	Elected	
Josh Tenorio	Democratic	Guam	2019	2027	Lieutenant Governor of Guam (2019–2027)	Elected	First openly LGBTQ lieutenant governor
Dave Upthegrove	Democratic	Washington	2025	present	Lands Commissioner of Washington (2025–present)	Elected	
Keisha Waites	Democratic	Georgia	2027	Elect	Insurance Commissioner of Georgia (elect)	Elected	
Harris Wofford	Democratic	Pennsylvania	1987	1991	Labor Secretary of Pennsylvania (1987–1991)	Appointed	Came out after leaving government.
Tony Woods	Democratic	Maryland	2023	2025	Acting Veterans Secretary of Maryland (2023); Veterans Secretary of Maryland (2023–2025)	Appointed	
JoCasta Zamarripa	Democratic	Wisconsin	2027	Elect	Secretary of State of Wisconsin (elect)	Elected	

=== State Legislative ===
The below lists continuous service within state legislative chambers, as well as the most senior legislative leadership positions (presiding officer, pro tempore, and floor leader). It does not include leadership positions below these levels or committee roles.

As of 2024, Louisiana is the only state to have never elected a queer or trans state legislator (whether open or known closeted after service).

Name	Party	State / Territory	Start	End	Office(s)	Notes
Kim Abbott	Democratic	Montana	2017	2025	Montana House of Representatives (2017–2025); House Minority Leader (2021–2025)	
Paula Aboud	Democratic	Arizona	2006	2013	Arizona Senate (2006–2013)	
Gabriel Acevero	Democratic	Maryland	2019	present	Maryland House of Delegates (2019–present)	
Dawn Adams	Democratic	Virginia	2018	2024	Virginia House of Delegates (2018–2024)	
Joe Alexander	Republican	New Hampshire	2018	2026	New Hampshire House of Representatives (2018–2026)	
Kristin Alfheim	Democratic	Wisconsin	2025	present	Wisconsin Senate (2025–present)	
Bob Allen	Republican	Florida	2000	2008	Florida House of Representatives (2000–2008)	Outed and left government.
Susan Allen	Democratic	Minnesota	2012	2019	Minnesota House of Representatives (2012–2019)	
Raghib Allie-Brennan	Democratic	Connecticut	2019	present	Connecticut House of Representatives (2019–present)	
Vernetta Alston	Democratic	North Carolina	2020	present	North Carolina House of Representatives (2020–present)	
Terez Amato	Democratic	Hawaii	2022	present	Hawaii House of Representatives (2022–present)	
Marianna Anaya	Democratic	New Mexico	2025	present	New Mexico House of Representatives (2025–present)	
Tom Ammiano	Democratic	California	2008	2014	California Assembly (2008–2014)	
Cal Anderson	Democratic	Washington	1987	1995	Washington House of Representatives (1987–1995); Washington Senate (1995)	First openly gay legislator in Washington
Denise Andrews	Democratic	Massachusetts	2011	2015	Massachusetts House of Representatives (2008–2015)	
Wayne Angevine	Democratic	Washington	1959	1963	Washington Senate (1959–1963)	Came out after leaving government.
Wayne Angevine	Democratic	Washington	1965	1967	Washington House of Representatives (1965–1967)	Came out after leaving government.
Nickie Antonio	Democratic	Ohio	2011	2027	Ohio House of Representatives (2011–2019); Ohio Senate (2019–2027); Senate Minority Leader (2023–2027)	First openly LGBTQ person elected to the Ohio General Assembly
Nelson Araujo	Democratic	Nevada	2014	2018	Nevada Assembly (2014–2018)	
Roberto Arango	New Progressive	Puerto Rico	2005	2011	Puerto Rico Senate (2005–2011); Senate Majority Leader (2009–2011)	Outed and left government.
Roberto Arango	Republican	Puerto Rico	2005	2011	Puerto Rico Senate (2005–2011); Senate Majority Leader (2009–2011)	Outed and left government.
Noah Arbit	Democratic	Michigan	2023	present	Michigan House of Representatives (2023–present)	
Lisbeth Arescurenaga	Democratic	Arizona	2027	Elect	Arizona House of Representatives (elect)	
Jennie Armstrong	Democratic	Alaska	2023	2025	Alaska House of Representatives (2023–2025)	One of first three LGBTQ members of the Alaska State Legislature (with Ashley Carrick and Andrew Gray)
Roy Ashburn	Republican	California	1996	2010	California Assembly (1996–2002); California Senate (2002–2010)	Came out as gay in 2010 shortly before leaving office
Toni Atkins	Democratic	California	2010	2024	California Assembly (2010–2016); Assembly Minority Leader (2012–2014); Assembly Speaker (2014–2016); California Senate (2016–2024); Senate President pro tempore (2018–2024)	First lesbian to serve as California Assembly Speaker and first LGBTQ person/woman serve as President Pro Tempore of the California Senate
Kelvin Atkinson	Democratic	Nevada	2002	2019	Nevada Assembly (2002–2012); Nevada Senate (2012–2019); Senate Majority Leader (2018–2019)	
Mo AuCoin	Democratic	Maine	2026	Elect	Maine House of Representatives (elect)	
Lorena Austin	Democratic	Arizona	2023	present	Arizona House of Representatives (2023–present)	
Jorge Báez Pagán	New Progressive	Puerto Rico	2020	2021	Puerto Rico House of Representatives (2020–2021)	First openly gay member of the Puerto Rico House of Representatives
Kyle Bailey	Democratic	Maine	2020	2021	Maine House of Representatives (2020–2021)	
Adam Bair	Democratic	South Dakota	2027	Elect	South Dakota House of Representatives (elect)	
Tammy Baldwin	Democratic	Wisconsin	1993	1999	Wisconsin Assembly (1993–1999)	First openly lesbian woman elected to Wisconsin Legislature.
Becca Balint	Democratic	Vermont	2015	2023	Vermont Senate (2015–2023); Senate Majority Leader (2017–2021); Senate President pro tempore (2021–2023)	First lesbian to serve in Vermont Senate and first woman and LGBTQ person to serve as president pro tempore in Vermont.
Chad Banks	Democratic	Wyoming	2021	2023	Wyoming House of Representatives (2021–2023)	
Imani Barnes	Democratic	Georgia	2023	present	Georgia House of Representatives (2023–present)	
Brittney Barreras	Democratic	New Mexico	2021	2022	New Mexico House of Representatives (2021–2022)	
Jarrett Barrios	Democratic	Massachusetts	1999	2007	Massachusetts House of Representatives (1999–2003); Massachusetts Senate (2003–2007)	
Jason Bartlett	Democratic	Connecticut	2007	2011	Connecticut House of Representatives (2007–2011)	
Phil Bartlett	Democratic	Maine	2004	2012	Maine Senate (2004–2012)	
Robert Bauman	Republican	Maryland	1971	1973	Maryland Senate (1971–1973)	Outed later while in Congress.
Mo Baxley	Democratic	New Hampshire	2006	2008	New Hampshire House of Representatives (2006–2008)	
Tim Baxter	Republican	New Hampshire	2020	2022	New Hampshire House of Representatives (2020–2022)	
Henry Beck	Democratic	Maine	2008	2016	Maine House of Representatives (2008–2016)	
Dylan Behler	Democratic	Maryland	2025	present	Maryland House of Delegates (2025–present)	
Lisa Belcastro	Democratic	Maryland	2020	2023	Maryland House of Delegates (2020–2023)	
Sam Bell	Democratic	Rhode Island	2019	present	Rhode Island Senate (2019–present)	
Simone Bell	Democratic	Georgia	2009	2015	Georgia House of Representatives (2009–2015)	First African-American lesbian to serve in a U.S. state legislature
Jessica Benham	Democratic	Pennsylvania	2021	present	Pennsylvania House of Representatives (2021–present)	Openly bisexual; first openly LGBTQ woman in the Pennsylvania Legislature
Bryce Bennett	Democratic	Montana	2011	2021	Montana House of Representatives (2011–2019); Montana Senate (2019–2021)	
Liz Bennett	Democratic	Iowa	2015	present	Iowa House of Representatives (2015–2023); Iowa Senate (2023–present)	First openly LGBTQ woman to serve in the Iowa Legislature
Joe Bertram	Democratic	Hawaii	2007	2011	Hawaii House of Representatives (2007–2011)	
Jackie Biskupski	Democratic	Utah	1999	2011	Utah House of Representatives (1999–2011)	First openly LGBTQ elected official in Utah
Larry Bliss	Democratic	Maine	2000	2011	Maine House of Representatives (2000–2008); Maine Senate (2008–2011)	
John Block	Republican	New Mexico	2023	present	New Mexico House of Representatives (2023–present)	
Tiff Bluemle	Democratic	Vermont	2021	2027	Vermont House of Representatives (2021–2027)	
Abi Boatman	Democratic	Kansas	2026	present	Kansas House of Representatives (2026–present)	
Randy Boehning	Republican	North Dakota	2002	2018	North Dakota House of Representatives (2002–2018)	Outed while in office after voting against queer rights.
Josh Boschee	Democratic	North Dakota	2012	2026	North Dakota House of Representatives (2012–2024); House Minority Leader (2018–2023); North Dakota Senate (2024–2026)	First openly LGBTQ person ever elected to the North Dakota Legislature.
Julia Boseman	Democratic	North Carolina	2005	2011	North Carolina Senate (2005–2011)	
Erik Bottcher	Democratic	New York	2026	present	New York Senate (2026–present)	
Ben Bowman	Democratic	Oregon	2023	present	Oregon House of Representatives (2023–present); House Majority Leader (2024–present); House Speaker (designate)	
Marcus Brandon	Democratic	North Carolina	2011	2015	North Carolina House of Representatives (2008–2015)	
Chelsey Branham	Democratic	Oklahoma	2018	2020	Oklahoma House of Representatives (2018–2020)	
Ryan Braunberger	Democratic	North Dakota	2022	present	North Dakota Senate (2022–present)	
Brady Bremer	Democratic	Montana	2027	Elect	Montana House of Representatives (elect)	
Murri Briel	Democratic	Illinois	2025	present	Illinois House of Representatives (2025–present)	
Jabari Brisport	Democratic	New York	2021	present	New York Senate (2021–present)	First openly gay person of color elected to the New York State Legislature
Cecil Brockman	Democratic	North Carolina	2015	2025	North Carolina House of Representatives (2015–2025)	
Harry Bronson	Democratic	New York	2011	present	New York Assembly (2011–present)	
Kate Brown	Democratic	Oregon	1991	2009	Oregon House of Representatives (1991–1997); Oregon Senate (1997–2009); Senate Majority Leader (2003–2009)	Openly bisexual and first LGBTQ minority and majority leader for Oregon Senate
Marcus Brown	Democratic	Connecticut	2022	present	Connecticut House of Representatives (2022–present)	
Tim Brown	Republican	Ohio	2013	2016	Ohio House of Representatives (2013–2016)	First openly gay man and first openly LGBTQ Republican elected to Ohio General Assembly
Will Brownsberger	Democratic	Massachusetts	2007	present	Massachusetts House of Representatives (2015–2012); Massachusetts Senate (2012–present); Senate President pro tempore (2019–present)	Came out as bisexual in office.
John Buckley	Republican	Virginia	1980	1982	Virginia House of Delegates (1980–1982)	Came out after leaving government.
Ray Buckley	Democratic	New Hampshire	1986	2004	New Hampshire House of Representatives (1986–2004)	
Angie Buhl	Democratic	South Dakota	2011	2017	South Dakota Senate (2011–2017)	
Lisa Bunker	Democratic	New Hampshire	2018	2022	New Hampshire House of Representatives (2018–2022)	With Gerri Cannon, New Hampshire's first openly trans women legislators.
Sara Burlingame	Democratic	Wyoming	2019	2021	Wyoming House of Representatives (2019–2021)	
Carol Burney	Democratic	New Hampshire	1996	2002	New Hampshire House of Representatives (1996–2002)	
Karen Burstein	Democratic	New York	1973	1979	New York Senate (1973–1979)	Came out after leaving office.
Billie Butler	Democratic	New Hampshire	2025	present	New Hampshire House of Representatives (2025–present)	
Deb Butler	Democratic	North Carolina	2017	present	North Carolina House of Representatives (2017–present); House Speaker pro tempore (designate)	
Ed Butler	Democratic	New Hampshire	2006	2010	New Hampshire House of Representatives (2006–2010, 2012–2020)	
Ed Butler	Democratic	New Hampshire	2012	2020	New Hampshire House of Representatives (2006–2010, 2012–2020)	
Beth Bye	Democratic	Connecticut	2007	2019	Connecticut House of Representatives (2007–2011); Connecticut Senate (2011–2019)	
Stephanie Byers	Democratic	Kansas	2021	2023	Kansas House of Representatives (2021–2023)	
Christopher Cabaldon	Democratic	California	2024	present	California Senate (2024–present)	
Marisabel Cabrera	Democratic	Wisconsin	2019	2024	Wisconsin Assembly (2019–2024)	
Brian Campion	Democratic	Vermont	2011	2025	Vermont House of Representatives (2011–2015); Vermont Senate (2015–2025)	
Jacob Candelaria	Democratic	New Mexico	2013	2022	New Mexico Senate (2013–2022)	
Gerri Cannon	Democratic	New Hampshire	2018	2024	New Hampshire House of Representatives (2018–2024)	With Lisa Bunker, New Hampshire's first openly trans women legislators.
Park Cannon	Democratic	Georgia	2016	2027	Georgia House of Representatives (2016–2027)	
Andrés Cano	Democratic	Arizona	2019	2023	Arizona House of Representatives (2019–2023); House Minority Leader (2023)	
Hunter Cantrell	Democratic	Minnesota	2019	2021	Minnesota House of Representatives (2019–2021)	
Hunter Cantrell	Democratic	Minnesota	2027	Elect	Minnesota House of Representatives (elect)	
Chuck Carpenter	Republican	Oregon	1995	1999	Oregon House of Representatives (1995–1999)	First openly LGBTQ Republican to serve any state legislature in the United States.
Tim Carpenter	Democratic	Wisconsin	1985	present	Wisconsin Assembly (1985–2003); Assembly Speaker pro tempore (1993–1995); Wisconsin Senate (2003–present); Senate President pro tempore (2012–2013)	
Ashley Carrick	Democratic	Alaska	2023	present	Alaska House of Representatives (2023–present)	One of first three LGBTQ members of the Alaska State Legislature (with Jennie Armstrong and Andrew Gray)
Emily Carris-Duncan	Democratic	Vermont	2025	present	Vermont House of Representatives (2025–present)	
Andre Carroll	Democratic	Pennsylvania	2024	present	Pennsylvania House of Representatives (2024–present)	
Kelly Cassidy	Democratic	Illinois	2011	present	Illinois House of Representatives (2011–present)	
Ronald Castorina	Republican	New York	2016	2019	New York Assembly (2016–2019)	
David Catania	Republican (1997–2004)	District of Columbia	1997	2015	D.C. Council (1997–2015)	First openly gay Councilmember for Washington, D.C.
David Catania	Independent (2004–2015)	District of Columbia	1997	2015	D.C. Council (1997–2015)	First openly gay Councilmember for Washington, D.C.
Sabrina Cervantes	Democratic	California	2016	present	California Assembly (2016–2024); California Senate (2024–present)	First out Latina elected to the California legislature
David Chappell	Democratic	Utah	2027	Elect	Utah House of Representatives (elect)	
César Chávez	Democratic	Arizona	2017	2023	Arizona House of Representatives (2017–2023)	
Justin Chenette	Democratic	Maine	2012	2020	Maine House of Representatives (2012–2016); Maine Senate (2016–2020)	
John Chenoweth	Democratic	Minnesota	1969	1979	Minnesota House of Representatives (1969–1971); Minnesota Senate (1971–1979)	Posthumously outed after he was murdered at a cruising site.
Ken Cheuvront	Democratic	Arizona	1995	2011	Arizona House of Representatives (1995–2003); Arizona Senate (2003–2011)	First LGBTQ person elected to Arizona House of Representatives and one of the first to the Senate
Phil Christofanelli	Democratic	Missouri	2017	2025	Missouri House of Representatives (2017–2025)	
David Cicilline	Democratic	Rhode Island	1995	2003	Rhode Island House of Representatives (1995–2003)	
Brian Cina	Progressive	Vermont	2017	present	Vermont House of Representatives (2017–present)	
Brian Cina	Democratic	Vermont	2017	present	Vermont House of Representatives (2017–present)	
David Clarenbach	Democratic	Wisconsin	1975	1993	Wisconsin Assembly (1975–1993); Assembly Speaker pro tempore (1983–1993)	Came out after retiring from Legislature
Karen Clark	Democratic	Minnesota	1981	2019	Minnesota House of Representatives (1981–2019)	
Demion Clinco	Democratic	Arizona	2014	2015	Arizona House of Representatives (2014–2015)	
Luke Clippinger	Democratic	Maryland	2011	present	Maryland House of Delegates (2011–present); House Speaker pro tempore (2026–present)	
Christine Cockley	Democratic	Ohio	2025	present	Ohio House of Representatives (2025–present)	
Laura Cohen	Democratic	Virginia	2024	present	Virginia House of Delegates (2024–present)	
Joanna Cole	Democratic	Vermont	2013	2017	Vermont House of Representatives (2013–2017)	
Josh Cole	Democratic	Virginia	2020	2022	Virginia House of Delegates (2020–2022, 2024–present)	
Josh Cole	Democratic	Virginia	2024	present	Virginia House of Delegates (2020–2022, 2024–present)	
Mike Colona	Democratic	Missouri	2009	2017	Missouri House of Representatives (2009–2017)	
Jo Comerford	Democratic	Massachusetts	2019	present	Massachusetts Senate (2019–present)	
Cathy Connolly	Democratic	Wyoming	2009	2023	Wyoming House of Representatives (2009–2023); House Minority Leader (2017–2023)	First openly LGBTQ member and Minority Leader in Wyoming House
Patty Contreras	Democratic	Arizona	2023	present	Arizona House of Representatives (2023–2027); Arizona Senate (elect)	
Molly Cook	Democratic	Texas	2024	present	Texas Senate (2024–present)	
Corey Corbin	Republican (2000–2003)	New Hampshire	2000	2004	New Hampshire House of Representatives (2000–2004)	
Corey Corbin	Democratic (2003–2004)	New Hampshire	2000	2004	New Hampshire House of Representatives (2000–2004)	
Mari Cordes	Progressive (2019–2022)	Vermont	2019	2025	Vermont House of Representatives (2019–2025)	
Mari Cordes	Democratic	Vermont	2019	2025	Vermont House of Representatives (2019–2025)	
Scott Cowger	Democratic	Maine	1996	2010	Maine House of Representatives (1996–2004); Maine Senate (2004–2010)	
Lydia Crafts	Democratic	Maine	2020	2026	Maine House of Representatives (2020–2026)	
Dan Cruce	Democratic	Delaware	2025	present	Delaware Senate (2025–present)	
Angelina Cruz	Democratic	Wisconsin	2025	present	Wisconsin Assembly (2025–present)	
Benjamin Cruz	Democratic	Guam	2005	2007	Guam Legislature (2005–2007, 2008–2018); Legislature Vice Speaker (2009–2017); Legislature Speaker (2017–2018)	
Benjamin Cruz	Democratic	Guam	2008	2018	Guam Legislature (2005–2007, 2008–2018); Legislature Vice Speaker (2009–2017); Legislature Speaker (2017–2018)	
Bonnie Cullison	Democratic	Maryland	2011	2027	Maryland House of Delegates (2011–2027)	
Brion Curran	Democratic	Minnesota	2023	present	Minnesota House of Representatives (2023–present)	
Jeffrey Currey	Democratic	Connecticut	2015	2025	Connecticut House of Representatives (2015–2025)	
Julian Cyr	Democratic	Massachusetts	2017	present	Massachusetts Senate (2017–present)	
Jim Dabakis	Democratic	Utah	2013	2019	Utah Senate (2013–2019)	
Allison Dahle	Democratic	North Carolina	2019	present	North Carolina House of Representatives (2019–present)	
Miguel Dávila	Democratic	Nevada	2026	Elect	Nevada Assembly (elect)	
Greg Davis	Republican	Mississippi	1991	1997	Mississippi House of Representatives (1991–1997)	Outed after leaving office.
Oscar De Los Santos	Democratic	Arizona	2023	present	Arizona House of Representatives (2023–present); House Minority Leader (2025–2027); House Speaker (designate)	
Jeremy Dean	Democratic	Missouri	2025	present	Missouri House of Representatives (2025–present)	
Winn Decker	Democratic	North Carolina	2027	Elect	North Carolina House of Representatives (elect)	
Marlene DeChane	Democratic	New Hampshire	1994	2008	New Hampshire House of Representatives (1994–2008)	
Jared Deck	Democratic	Oklahoma	2022	present	Oklahoma House of Representatives (2022–present)	
Todd Delmay	Democratic	Florida	2026	Elect	Florida House of Representatives (elect)	
Carl DeMaio	Republican	California	2024	present	California Assembly (2024–present)	
Scott Dibble	Democratic	Minnesota	2001	present	Minnesota House of Representatives (2001–2003); Minnesota Senate (2003–present)	
Ruby Dickson	Democratic	Colorado	2023	2023	Colorado House of Representatives (2023)	
Emily Dievendorf	Democratic	Michigan	2023	present	Michigan House of Representatives (2023–present)	
Michael Dively	Republican	Michigan	1969	1975	Michigan House of Representatives (1969–1975)	Came out after leaving government.
Spencer Dixon	Democratic	Maryland	2027	Elect	Maryland House of Delegates (elect)	
Beth Doglio	Democratic	Washington	2017	2021	Washington House of Representatives (2017–2021, 2023–present)	
Beth Doglio	Democratic	Washington	2023	present	Washington House of Representatives (2017–2021, 2023–present)	
Robert Dostis	Democratic	Vermont	2001	2009	Vermont House of Representatives (2001–2009)	
Lindsey Dougherty	Democratic	Virginia	2026	present	Virginia House of Delegates (2026–present)	
Brian Doughty	Democratic	Utah	2011	2013	Utah House of Representatives (2011–2013)	
Karla Drenner	Democratic	Georgia	2001	present	Georgia House of Representatives (2001–present)	First openly LGBTQ member of the Georgia General Assembly
Jim Dressel	Republican	Michigan	1979	1985	Michigan House of Representatives (1979–1985)	Came out after leaving government.
Leon Drolet	Republican	Michigan	2001	2007	Michigan House of Representatives (2001–2007)	
Tom Duane	Democratic	New York	1999	2013	New York Senate (1999–2013)	First openly gay and openly HIV-positive member of the New York State Senate
Randy Dunn	Democratic	Missouri	2013	2017	Missouri House of Representatives (2013–2017)	
Ann Dussault	Democratic	Montana	1974	1981	Montana House of Representatives (1974–1981)	
Holly Eaton	Democratic	Maine	2022	present	Maine House of Representatives (2022–present)	
Adam Ebbin	Democratic	Virginia	2004	2026	Virginia House of Delegates (2004–2012); Virginia Senate (2012–2026)	First LGBTQ member of Virginia House and Senate
Elizabeth Edwards	Democratic	New Hampshire	2014	2018	New Hampshire House of Representatives (2014–2018)	
Susan Eggman	Democratic	California	2012	2024	California Assembly (2012–2020); California Senate (2020–2024)	
George Eighmey	Democratic	Oregon	1993	1999	Oregon House of Representatives (1993–1999)	First openly LGBTQ person elected to Oregon state legislature
Jason Elliott	Republican	South Carolina	2016	present	South Carolina House of Representatives (2016–2024); South Carolina Senate (2024–present)	
Sade Elhawary	Democratic	California	2024	present	California Assembly (2024–present)	
Johnny Ellis	Democratic	Alaska	1987	2017	Alaska House of Representatives (1987–1993); Alaska Senate (1993–2017); Senate Majority Leader (2009–2011)	Came out in 2016 after leaving office
Elisabeth Epps	Democratic	Colorado	2023	2025	Colorado House of Representatives (2023–2025)	
Daneya Esgar	Democratic	Colorado	2015	2023	Colorado House of Representatives (2015–2023); House Majority Leader (2021–2023)	
Amanda Estep-Burton	Democratic	West Virginia	2018	2020	West Virginia House of Delegates (2018–2020)	
Tim Eustace	Democratic	New Jersey	2012	2018	New Jersey Assembly (2012–2018)	Second openly gay person ever elected to the New Jersey Legislature
Kris Fair	Democratic	Maryland	2023	present	Maryland House of Delegates (2023–present)	
Susan Farnsworth	Democratic	Maine	1988	1994	Maine House of Representatives (1988–1994)	
Ryan Fecteau	Democratic	Maine	2014	2022	Maine House of Representatives (2014–2022, 2024–present); House Speaker (2020–2022, 2024–present)	First openly gay Speaker of the Maine House of Representatives
Ryan Fecteau	Democratic	Maine	2024	present	Maine House of Representatives (2014–2022, 2024–present); House Speaker (2020–2022, 2024–present)	First openly gay Speaker of the Maine House of Representatives
Jim Ferlo	Democratic	Pennsylvania	2003	2015	Pennsylvania Senate (2003–2015)	
Art Feltman	Democratic	Connecticut	1997	2009	Connecticut House of Representatives (1997–2009)	Likely first out legislator in Connecticut Assembly
Mark Ferrandino	Democratic	Colorado	2007	2015	Colorado House of Representatives (2007–2015); House Minority Leader (2011–2013); House Speaker (2013–2015)	First openly gay House Speaker and House Minority Leader of the Colorado General Assembly
Frank Ferri	Democratic	Rhode Island	2007	2015	Rhode Island House of Representatives (2007–2015)	
Shaun Filiault	Democratic (2022–2023)	New Hampshire	2022	2024	New Hampshire House of Representatives (2022–2024)	
Shaun Filiault	Independent (2023–2024)	New Hampshire	2022	2024	New Hampshire House of Representatives (2022–2024)	
Leigh Finke	Democratic	Minnesota	2023	present	Minnesota House of Representatives (2023–present)	First openly trans state legislator in Minnesota
Will Fitzpatrick	Democratic	Rhode Island	1993	1997	Rhode Island Senate (1993–1997)	First our LGBTQ person to Rhode Island state legislature
Patrick Flaherty	Democratic	Connecticut	1993	2003	Connecticut House of Representatives (1993–2003)	
Ed Flanagan	Democratic	Vermont	2005	2011	Vermont Senate (2005–2011)	
Mike Fleck	Republican	Pennsylvania	2007	2015	Pennsylvania House of Representatives (2007–2015)	
Thomas Fleury	Democratic	Vermont	1993	1995	Vermont House of Representatives (1993–1995)	
Kay Floyd	Democratic	Oklahoma	2012	2024	Oklahoma House of Representatives (2012–2014); Oklahoma Senate (2014–2024); Senate Minority Leader (2018–2024)	
Mark Foley	Republican	Florida	1990	1994	Florida House of Representatives (1990–1992); Florida Senate (1992–1994)	Outed later while in Congress.
J. D. Ford	Democratic	Indiana	2018	2026	Indiana Senate (2018–2026)	First openly LGBTQ person elected to the Indiana General Assembly
Austin Foss	Democratic	North Dakota	2024	present	North Dakota House of Representatives (2024–present); House Minority Leader (designate)	
Lily Foss	Democratic	New Hampshire	2024	present	New Hampshire House of Representatives (2024–present)	
Kelly Fowler	Democratic	Virginia	2018	present	Virginia House of Delegates (2018–present)	Came out while in office.
Gordon Fox	Democratic	Rhode Island	1993	2015	Rhode Island House of Representatives (1993–2015); House Majority Leader (2003–2010); House Speaker (2010–2014)	First openly LGBTQ Speaker of the House
Barney Frank	Democratic	Massachusetts	1973	1981	Massachusetts House of Representatives (1973–1981)	Came out later while in Congress.
John Fredrickson	Democratic	Nebraska	2023	present	Nebraska Legislature (2023–present)	
Elizabeth Fuchs	Democratic	Missouri	2025	present	Missouri House of Representatives (2025–present)	
Cathleen Galgiani	Democratic	California	2006	2020	California Assembly (2006–2012); California Senate (2012–2020)	
Rochelle Galindo	Democratic	Colorado	2019	2019	Colorado House of Representatives (2019)	
Steve Gallardo	Democratic	Arizona	2003	2009	Arizona House of Representatives (2003–2009)	
Steve Gallardo	Democratic	Arizona	2011	2015	Arizona Senate (2011–2015)	
Brian Garcia	Democratic	Arizona	2025	present	Arizona House of Representatives (2025–present)	
Josey Garcia	Democratic	Texas	2023	present	Texas House of Representatives (2023–present)	
Lorena Garcia	Democratic	Colorado	2023	present	Colorado House of Representatives (2023–present)	
Kevin Garner	Democratic	Missouri	2027	Elect	Missouri House of Representatives (elect)	
Althea Garrison	Republican	Massachusetts	1993	1995	Massachusetts House of Representatives (1993–1995)	First trans person to hold state office; outed while in office.
Kerry Gauthier	Democratic	Minnesota	2011	2013	Minnesota House of Representatives (2011–2013)	
Lindsay Gilchrist	Democratic	Colorado	2025	present	Colorado House of Representatives (2025–present)	
Chris Gilmer-Hill	Democratic	Michigan	2027	Elect	Michigan House of Representatives (elect)	
Joann Ginal	Democratic	Colorado	2013	2025	Colorado House of Representatives (2013–2019); Colorado Senate (2019–2025)	
Heather Giugni	Democratic	Hawaii	2011	2013	Hawaii House of Representatives (2011–2013)	
Deborah Glick	Democratic	New York	1991	2027	New York Assembly (1991–2027)	First openly LGBTQ member of the New York State legislature
Todd Gloria	Democratic	California	2016	2020	California Assembly (2016–2020)	
Hazel Gluck	Republican	New Jersey	1980	1982	New Jersey Assembly (1980–1982)	Came out after leaving government.
Calvin Goings	Democratic	Washington	1995	2001	Washington Senate (1995–2001)	
Jackie Goldberg	Democratic	California	2000	2006	California Assembly (2000–2006)	
Cheryl Golek	Democratic	Maine	2022	present	Maine House of Representatives (2022–present)	
Cecelia González	Democratic	Nevada	2020	present	Nevada Assembly (2020–present)	
Jessica González	Democratic	Texas	2019	present	Texas House of Representatives (2019–present)	
Mark Gonzalez	Democratic	California	2024	present	California Assembly (2024–present)	
Mary González	Democratic	Texas	2013	present	Texas House of Representatives (2013–present)	
Jessica González-Rojas	Democratic	New York	2021	present	New York Assembly (2021–2027); New York Senate (elect)	
Naomi Gonzalez	Democratic	Texas	2011	2015	Texas House of Representatives (2011–2015)	
Rich Gordon	Democratic	California	2010	2016	California Assembly (2010–2016)	
Joe Grabarz	Democratic	Connecticut	1989	1993	Connecticut House of Representatives (1989–1993)	
Lisa Grafstein	Democratic	North Carolina	2023	present	North Carolina Senate (2023–present)	
Jim Graham	Democratic	District of Columbia	1999	2015	D.C. Council (1999–2015)	
Andrew Gray	Democratic	Alaska	2023	present	Alaska House of Representatives (2023–present)	One of first three LGBTQ members of the Alaska State Legislature (with Jennie Armstrong and Ashley Carrick)
Dacia Grayber	Democratic	Oregon	2021	present	Oregon House of Representatives (2021–present)	
Will Greer	Democratic	Vermont	2025	present	Vermont House of Representatives (2025–present)	Also the youngest member of the Vermont General Assembly
Matt Gress	Republican	Arizona	2023	2027	Arizona House of Representatives (2023–2027)	
Don Guardian	Republican	New Jersey	2022	present	New Jersey Assembly (2022–present)	
Patrick Guerriero	Republican	Massachusetts	1993	1998	Massachusetts House of Representatives (1993–1998)	Came out publicly as gay while running for lieutenant governor in 2002
Mary Guggenheim	Democratic	Montana	1999	2001	Montana House of Representatives (1999–2001)	
Steve Gunderson	Republican	Wisconsin	1975	1979	Wisconsin Assembly (1975–1979)	Outed as gay in 1994 while serving in Congress
Reed Gusciora	Democratic	New Jersey	1996	2018	New Jersey Assembly (1996–2018)	First openly gay member of the New Jersey state legislature
Lucía Guzmán	Democratic	Colorado	2010	2019	Colorado Senate (2010–2019)	
Jeff Hales	Democratic	Missouri	2025	present	Missouri House of Representatives (2025–present)	
Iris Halpern	Democratic	Colorado	2027	Elect	Colorado House of Representatives (elect)	
Carrie Hamblen	Democratic	New Mexico	2021	present	New Mexico Senate (2021–present)	
Ryan Hampton	Democratic	Nevada	2026	Elect	Nevada Assembly (elect)	
Tom Hannegan	Republican	Missouri	2017	2021	Missouri House of Representatives (2017–2021)	
Jess Hanson	Democratic	Minnesota	2021	present	Minnesota House of Representatives (2021–present)	
Austin Harris	Republican	Iowa	2023	present	Iowa House of Representatives (2023–present)	
Dallas Harris	Democratic	Nevada	2018	2024	Nevada Senate (2018–2024)	
Greg Harris	Democratic	Illinois	2006	2023	Illinois House of Representatives (2006–2023); House Majority Leader (2019–2023)	
Kerri Harris	Democratic	Delaware	2023	present	Delaware House of Representatives (2023–present); House Majority Leader (2025–present)	
Torrey Harris	Democratic	Tennessee	2021	present	Tennessee House of Representatives (2021–present)	With Eddie Mannis, first openly gay member of the Tennessee House of Representatives
Kirsten Harris-Talley	Democratic	Washington	2021	2023	Washington House of Representatives (2021–2023)	
Donavon Hawk	Democratic	Montana	2021	present	Montana House of Representatives (2021–present)	
Sahara Hayes	Democratic	Utah	2023	present	Utah House of Representatives (2023–present)	
James Healey	Democratic	Nevada	2012	2014	Nevada Assembly (2012–2014)	
Matt Heinz	Democratic	Arizona	2009	2013	Arizona House of Representatives (2009–2013)	
Aaron Henry	Democratic	Mississippi	1980	1996	Mississippi House of Representatives (1980–1996)	
Rozia Henson	Democratic	Virginia	2024	present	Virginia House of Delegates (2024–present)	First out Black person elected to Virginia House
Daniel Hernández	Democratic	Arizona	2017	2023	Arizona House of Representatives (2017–2023)	
Melody Hernandez	Democratic	Arizona	2021	2025	Arizona House of Representatives (2021–2025)	
Leslie Herod	Democratic	Colorado	2017	2025	Colorado House of Representatives (2017–2025)	First out Black person elected to Colorado House
Susan Herrera	Democratic	New Mexico	2019	2026	New Mexico House of Representatives (2019–2026)	
Keturah Herron	Democratic	Kentucky	2022	present	Kentucky House of Representatives (2022–2025); Kentucky Senate (2025–present)	First LGBTQ person elected to the Kentucky General Assembly
Nancy Hetherington	Democratic	Rhode Island	1995	2003	Rhode Island House of Representatives (1995–2003)	
Craig Hickman	Democratic	Maine	2012	2021	Maine House of Representatives (2012–2020)	
Craig Hickman	Democratic	Maine	2021	present	Maine Senate (2021–present)	
Joshua Higginbotham	Republican	West Virginia	2016	2021	West Virginia House of Delegates (2016–2021)	
Natalie Higgins	Democratic	Massachusetts	2017	present	Massachusetts House of Representatives (2017–present)	
Dana Hilliard	Democratic	New Hampshire	1992	1996	New Hampshire House of Representatives (1992–1996, 2004–2008)	
Dana Hilliard	Democratic	New Hampshire	2004	2008	New Hampshire House of Representatives (1992–1996, 2004–2008)	
Jon Hoadley	Democratic	Michigan	2015	2021	Michigan House of Representatives (2015–2021)	
Alexis Hoffkling	Democratic	Colorado	2027	Elect	Colorado House of Representatives (elect)	
Kate Hogan	Democratic	Massachusetts	2009	present	Massachusetts House of Representatives (2009–present); House Speaker pro tempore (2021–present)	
Athena Hollins	Democratic	Minnesota	2021	present	Minnesota House of Representatives (2021–present)	
Daniel Holtmeyer	Democratic	Arkansas	2027	Elect	Arkansas House of Representatives (elect)	
Jason Hoskins	Democratic	Michigan	2023	present	Michigan House of Representatives (2023–2027); Michigan Senate (elect)	
Steve Howard	Democratic	Vermont	1993	1999	Vermont House of Representatives (1993–1999, 2005–2011)	
Steve Howard	Democratic	Vermont	2005	2011	Vermont House of Representatives (1993–1999, 2005–2011)	
SJ Howell	Democratic	Montana	2023	present	Montana House of Representatives (2023–present); House Minority Leader (designate)	
Brad Hoylman	Democratic	New York	2013	2025	New York Senate (2013–2025)	
Bentley Hudgins	Democratic	Georgia	2027	Elect	Georgia House of Representatives (elect)	
Megan Hunt	Democratic (2019–2023)	Nebraska	2019	2027	Nebraska Legislature (2019–2027)	
Megan Hunt	Independent (2023–2027)	Nebraska	2019	2027	Nebraska Legislature (2019–2027)	
Allison Ikley-Freeman	Democratic	Oklahoma	2018	2021	Oklahoma Senate (2018–2021)	
Debbie Ingram	Democratic	Vermont	2017	2021	Vermont Senate (2017–2021)	
Dan Innis	Republican	New Hampshire	2016	2018	New Hampshire Senate (2016–2018, 2022–2026)	
Dan Innis	Republican	New Hampshire	2022	2026	New Hampshire Senate (2016–2018, 2022–2026)	
Celia Israel	Democratic	Texas	2014	2023	Texas House of Representatives (2014–2023)	
Kim Iwamoto	Democratic	Hawaii	2024	present	Hawaii House of Representatives (2024–present)	First trans legislator in Hawaii history.
Chantel Jackson	Democratic	New York	2021	present	New York Assembly (2021–present)	
Corey Jackson	Democratic	California	2022	present	California Assembly (2022–present)	
Jack Jackson	Democratic	Arizona	2003	2005	Arizona House of Representatives (2003–2005)	
Jack Jackson	Democratic	Arizona	2011	2013	Arizona Senate (2011–2013)	
Kim Jackson	Democratic	Georgia	2021	present	Georgia Senate (2021–present)	
Mike Jacobs	Democratic (2005–2007)	Georgia	2005	2014	Georgia House of Representatives (2005–2014)	Came out after leaving office.
Mike Jacobs	Republican (2007–2014)	Georgia	2005	2014	Georgia House of Representatives (2005–2014)	Came out after leaving office.
Cheryl Jacques	Democratic	Massachusetts	1993	2004	Massachusetts Senate (1993–2004)	
Kathleen James	Progressive	Vermont	2019	2027	Vermont House of Representatives (2019–2027)	
Kathleen James	Democratic	Vermont	2019	2027	Vermont House of Representatives (2019–2027)	
Leo Jaramillo	Democratic	New Mexico	2021	present	New Mexico Senate (2021–present)	
Norman Jesse	Democratic	Iowa	1969	1981	Iowa House of Representatives (1969–1981)	Was in a closeted relationship with Dan Johnston.
Laurie Jinkins	Democratic	Washington	2011	present	Washington House of Representatives (2011–present); House Speaker (2020–present)	
Ann Johnson	Democratic	Texas	2021	present	Texas House of Representatives (2021–present)	
Christine Johnson	Democratic	Utah	2007	2010	Utah House of Representatives (2007–2010)	
Dominique Johnson	Democratic	Connecticut	2023	present	Connecticut House of Representatives (2023–present)	
Jamie Johnson	Democratic	Missouri	2023	2025	Missouri House of Representatives (2023–2025)	
Julie Johnson	Democratic	Texas	2019	2025	Texas House of Representatives (2019–2025)	
Dan Johnston	Democratic	Iowa	1967	1969	Iowa House of Representatives (1967–1969)	Was in a closeted relationship with Norman Jesse.
Jolanda Jones	Democratic	Texas	2022	present	Texas House of Representatives (2022–present)	
Shev Jones	Democratic	Florida	2012	2026	Florida House of Representatives (2012–2020); Florida Senate (2020–2026)	First openly LGBTQ black person elected to the Florida Legislature
Venton Jones	Democratic	Texas	2023	present	Texas House of Representatives (2023–present)	
Barbara Jordan	Democratic	Texas	1967	1973	Texas Senate (1967–1973); Senate President pro tempore (1972)	Posthumously outed.
Jo Jordan	Democratic	Hawaii	2011	2016	Hawaii House of Representatives (2011–2016)	
Sydney Jordan	Democratic	Minnesota	2020	present	Minnesota House of Representatives (2020–present)	
Jolie Justus	Democratic	Missouri	2007	2015	Missouri Senate (2007–2015); Senate Minority Leader (2013–2015)	First openly gay member of the Missouri Senate
Anne Kaiser	Democratic	Maryland	2003	present	Maryland House of Delegates (2003–present); House Majority Leader (2015–2017)	
Alex Kasser	Democratic	Connecticut	2019	2021	Connecticut Senate (2019–2021)	
Christine Kaufmann	Democratic	Montana	2001	2017	Montana House of Representatives (2001–2007); Montana Senate (2007–2017)	First out person elected to Montana Senate
Heather Keeler	Democratic	Minnesota	2021	2027	Minnesota House of Representatives (2021–2027)	
Christine Kehoe	Democratic	California	2000	2012	California Assembly (2000–2004); California Senate (2004–2012)	
Micah Kellner	Democratic	New York	2007	2015	New York Assembly (2007–2015)	
RaShaun Kemp	Democratic	Georgia	2025	present	Georgia Senate (2025–present)	
Malcolm Kenyatta	Democratic	Pennsylvania	2019	present	Pennsylvania House of Representatives (2019–present)	First openly LGBTQ person of color elected to the Pennsylvania General Assembly
Darius Kila	Democratic	Hawaii	2022	present	Hawaii House of Representatives (2022–present)	
Christine Kildruff	Democratic	Washington	2015	2021	Washington House of Representatives (2015–2021)	
John Killacky	Democratic	Vermont	2019	2023	Vermont House of Representatives (2019–2023)	
Rebecca Kislak	Democratic	Rhode Island	2019	present	Rhode Island House of Representatives (2019–present)	
Derek Kitchen	Democratic	Utah	2019	2023	Utah House of Representatives (2019–2023)	
Paul Koering	Democratic	Minnesota	2003	2011	Minnesota Senate (2003–2011)	
Chris Kolb	Democratic	Michigan	2001	2007	Michigan House of Representatives (2001–2007)	First openly gay member of Michigan Legislature
Jim Kolbe	Republican	Arizona	1977	1982	Arizona Senate (1977–1982)	Came out later while in Congress.
Emilie Kornheiser	Democratic	Vermont	2019	present	Vermont House of Representatives (2019–present)	
Tina Kotek	Democratic	Oregon	2007	2022	Oregon House of Representatives (2007–2022); House Speaker pro tempore (2011); House Majority Leader (2011–2013); House Speaker (2013–2022)	First openly lesbian state House speaker in U.S.
Liish Kozlowski	Democratic	Minnesota	2023	present	Minnesota House of Representatives (2023–present)	
Reed Krewson	Democratic	Kansas	2026	Elect	Kansas House of Representatives (elect)	
Carl Kruger	Democratic	New York	1994	2011	New York Senate (1994–2011)	
Sheila Kuehl	Democratic	California	1994	2008	California Assembly (1994–2000); California Senate (2000–2008)	First openly LGBTQ California State Legislature member
Tony Labranche	Democratic (2020–2022)	New Hampshire	2020	2022	New Hampshire House of Representatives (2020–2022)	Youngest openly LGBTQ legislator in U.S. History
Tony Labranche	Independent (2022)	New Hampshire	2020	2022	New Hampshire House of Representatives (2020–2022)	Youngest openly LGBTQ legislator in U.S. History
John Laird	Democratic	California	2002	2008	California Assembly (2002–2008)	First out California Assembly gay men alongside Mark Leno
John Laird	Democratic	California	2020	present	California Senate (2020–present)	First out California Assembly gay men alongside Mark Leno
Saudia LaMont	Democratic	Vermont	2023	present	Vermont House of Representatives (2023–present)	
Ricardo Lara	Democratic	California	2010	2019	California Assembly (2010–2012); California Senate (2012–2019)	
Stacie Laughton	Democratic	New Hampshire	2022	2022	New Hampshire House of Representatives (2022)	Previously elected to the House in 2012, becoming the first trans person to win a legislative election, but election was nullified before taking office.
Mike Lawlor	Democratic	Connecticut	1987	2011	Connecticut House of Representatives (1987–2011)	
Josie Leavitt	Democratic	Vermont	2023	2025	Vermont House of Representatives (2023–2025)	
Alex Lee	Democratic	California	2020	present	California Assembly (2020–present)	First openly bisexual member of the California Assembly
Cole LeFavour	Democratic	Idaho	2004	2012	Idaho House of Representatives (2004–2008); Idaho Senate (2009–2012)	First openly LGBTQ member of the Idaho Legislature.
Mark Leno	Democratic	California	2002	2016	California Assembly (2002–2008); California Senate (2008–2016)	One of two first out gay men elected to California State Assembly and first elected to the State Senate
Elinor Levin	Democratic	Iowa	2023	present	Iowa House of Representatives (2023–present)	
Mark Levine	Democratic	Virginia	2016	2022	Virginia House of Delegates (2016–2022)	Openly gay Congressman elected to Virginia House of Delegates
Jack Lewis	Democratic	Massachusetts	2017	present	Massachusetts House of Representatives (2017–present)	
Sonya Lewis	Democratic	Colorado	2019	2025	Colorado House of Representatives (2019–2021); Colorado Senate (2021–2025)	
Kate Lieber	Democratic	Oregon	2021	present	Oregon Senate (2021–present); Senate Majority Leader (2023–2024)	
Marko Liias	Democratic	Washington	2008	present	Washington House of Representatives (2008–2014); Washington Senate (2014–present)	
Marvin Lim	Democratic	Georgia	2021	present	Georgia House of Representatives (2021–present)	
Bill Lippert	Democratic	Vermont	1994	2023	Vermont House of Representatives (1994–2023)	
Susan Longley	Democratic	Maine	1994	2002	Maine Senate (1994–2002)	
Jason Lorber	Democratic	Vermont	2005	2013	Vermont House of Representatives (2005–2013)	
Donna Loring	Democratic	Maine	1996	2008	Maine House of Representatives (1996–2008)	Possibly one of first two out women in Maine legislature (with Judy Powers)
Evan Low	Democratic	California	2014	2024	California Assembly (2014–2024)	
Janet Lucas	Democratic	New Hampshire	2024	present	New Hampshire House of Representatives (2024–present)	
Ismael Luna	Democratic	Wisconsin	2027	Elect	Wisconsin Assembly (elect)	
Daniel Lundby	Democratic	Iowa	2013	2015	Iowa House of Representatives (2013–2015)	
Tiara Mack	Democratic	Rhode Island	2021	present	Rhode Island Senate (2021–present)	
Jim MacKay	Democratic	New Hampshire	1994	1996	New Hampshire House of Representatives (1994–1996, 2000–2008, 2010–2026)	
Jim MacKay	Democratic	New Hampshire	2000	2008	New Hampshire House of Representatives (1994–1996, 2000–2008, 2010–2026)	
Jim MacKay	Democratic	New Hampshire	2010	2026	New Hampshire House of Representatives (1994–1996, 2000–2008, 2010–2026)	
Christopher Lyddy	Democratic	Connecticut	2009	2013	Connecticut House of Representatives (2009–2013)	
Ian Mackey	Democratic	Missouri	2019	2026	Missouri House of Representatives (2019–2026)	
Nicole Macri	Democratic	Washington	2017	present	Washington House of Representatives (2017–present)	
Rick Madaleno	Democratic	Maryland	2003	2019	Maryland House of Delegates (2003–2007); Maryland Senate (2007–2019)	First openly LGBTQ member of the Maryland Senate
Zach Maier	Democratic	Kansas	2026	Elect	Kansas House of Representatives (elect)	
Liz Malia	Democratic	Massachusetts	1998	2003	Massachusetts House of Representatives (1998–2003)	
Dennis Mangers	Democratic	California	1976	1980	California Assembly (1976–1980)	Came out after leaving government.
Ashley Manlove	Democratic	Missouri	2019	2025	Missouri House of Representatives (2019–2025)	
Eddie Mannis	Republican	Tennessee	2021	2023	Tennessee House of Representatives (2021–2023)	With Torrey Harris, first openly gay member of the Tennessee House of Representatives
Evelyn Mantilla	Democratic	Connecticut	1997	2007	Connecticut House of Representatives (1997–2007)	
Christian Manuel	Democratic	Texas	2023	present	Texas House of Representatives (2023–present)	
Andrew Martin	Democratic	Nevada	2012	2014	Nevada Assembly (2012–2014)	
Jim Martin	Democratic	Maine	2008	2010	Maine House of Representatives (2008–2010)	
Ashanti Martinez	Democratic	Maryland	2023	present	Maryland House of Delegates (2023–present)	
Dina Martinez-Rutherford	Democratic	Wisconsin	2027	Elect	Wisconsin Assembly (elect)	
Glen Maxey	Democratic	Texas	1991	2003	Texas House of Representatives (1991–2003)	First openly LGBTQ member of Texas Legislature
Steve May	Republican	Arizona	1999	2003	Arizona House of Representatives (1999–2003)	
Erin Maye Quade	Democratic	Minnesota	2017	2019	Minnesota House of Representatives (2017–2019)	One of two first openly-lesbian women elected to Minnesota Senate
Erin Maye Quade	Democratic	Minnesota	2023	present	Minnesota Senate (2023–present)	One of two first openly-lesbian women elected to Minnesota Senate
La'Tasha Mayes	Democratic	Pennsylvania	2023	present	Pennsylvania House of Representatives (2023–present)	
Andrew Maynard	Democratic	Connecticut	2007	2017	Connecticut Senate (2007–2017)	
Al McAffrey	Democratic	Oklahoma	2006	2014	Oklahoma House of Representatives (2006–2012); Oklahoma Senate (2012–2014)	
Joan McBride	Democratic	Washington	2015	2019	Washington House of Representatives (2015–2019)	
Sarah McBride	Democratic	Delaware	2021	2025	Delaware Senate (2021–2025)	First openly trans state senator in the U.S.
Michelle McCane	Democratic	Oklahoma	2024	present	Oklahoma House of Representatives (2024–present)	
Adele McClure	Democratic	Virginia	2024	present	Virginia House of Delegates (2024–present)	
Joseph McClusky	Democratic	Michigan	2027	Elect	Michigan House of Representatives (elect)	
Dale McCormick	Democratic	Maine	1990	1996	Maine Senate (1990–1996)	
Matt McCoy	Democratic	Iowa	1993	2019	Iowa House of Representatives (1993–1997); Iowa Senate (1997–2019)	
Scott McCoy	Democratic	Utah	2005	2009	Utah Senate (2005–2009)	
John McCrostie	Democratic	Idaho	2014	2022	Idaho House of Representatives (2014–2022)	
Tippi McCullough	Democratic	Arkansas	2019	present	Arkansas House of Representatives (2019–present); House Minority Leader (2021–2025)	
Joe McDermott	Democratic	Washington	2001	2010	Washington House of Representatives (2001–2007); Washington Senate (2007–2010)	
Andrew McDonald	Democratic	Connecticut	2003	2011	Connecticut Senate (2003–2011)	
Mike McFall	Democratic	Michigan	2023	present	Michigan House of Representatives (2023–present)	
Jim McGreevey	Democratic	New Jersey	1990	1998	New Jersey Assembly (1990–1992); New Jersey Senate (1994–1998)	Came out later as governor.
Maggie McIntosh	Democratic	Maryland	1992	2023	Maryland House of Delegates (1992–2023)	First LGBTQ state legislator in Maryland, came out in 2001
Larry McKeon	Democratic	Illinois	1997	2005	Illinois House of Representatives (1997–2005)	First out member of Illinois General Assembly and possibly first HIV positive elected official in United States
Stewart McKinney	Republican	Connecticut	1967	1971	Connecticut House of Representatives (1967–1971)	Posthumously outed.
Andrew McLean	Democratic	Maine	2012	2020	Maine House of Representatives (2012–2020)	
Kirk McPike	Democratic	Virginia	2026	present	Virginia House of Delegates (2026–present)	
Deb Mell	Democratic	Illinois	2009	2013	Illinois House of Representatives (2009–2013)	
Caroline Menjivar	Democratic	California	2022	present	California Senate (2022–present)	
Annie Menz	Democratic	Oklahoma	2022	present	Oklahoma House of Representatives (2022–present)	
Heather Meyer	Democratic	Kansas	2021	present	Kansas House of Representatives (2021–present)	First openly bisexual member of the Kansas House of Representatives
Robert Meza	Democratic	Arizona	2003	2023	Arizona House of Representatives (2003–2011, 2019–2023); Arizona Senate (2011–2019)	First openly gay Hispanic/Latino state legislator in the U.S.
Mike Michaud	Democratic	Maine	1980	2003	Maine House of Representatives (1980–1994); Maine Senate (1994–2003); Senate President (2000–2001)	Came out later while in Congress.
Carole Migden	Democratic	California	1996	2002	California Assembly (1996–2002)	One of first out queer women to serve in California legislature and first woman and lesbian to chair Committee on Appropriations
Carole Migden	Democratic	California	2004	2008	California Senate (2004–2008)	One of first out queer women to serve in California legislature and first woman and lesbian to chair Committee on Appropriations
McKim Mitchell	Democratic	New Hampshire	1998	2004	New Hampshire House of Representatives (1998–2004)	
Heather Mizeur	Democratic	Maryland	2007	2015	Maryland House of Delegates (2007–2015)	
Thomas Moakley	Democratic	Massachusetts	2025	present	Massachusetts House of Representatives (2025–present)	
Jim Moeller	Democratic	Washington	2003	2017	Washington House of Representatives (2003–2017); House Speaker pro tempore (2011–2017)	
Sam Montaño	Democratic	Massachusetts	2023	present	Massachusetts House of Representatives (2023–present)	
Armando Montero	Democratic	Arizona	2027	Elect	Arizona House of Representatives (elect)	
Allison Montgomery	Democratic	Alabama	2026	Elect	Alabama House of Representatives (elect)	
Roger Montoya	Democratic	New Mexico	2021	2023	New Mexico House of Representatives (2021–2023)	
Matt Moonen	Democratic	Maine	2012	2020	Maine House of Representatives (2012–2020, 2022–present); House Majority Leader (2018–2020, 2024–present)	
Matt Moonen	Democratic	Maine	2022	present	Maine House of Representatives (2012–2020, 2022–present); House Majority Leader (2018–2020, 2024–present)	
John Moran	Democratic	Massachusetts	2023	present	Massachusetts House of Representatives (2023–present)	
Diana Moreno	Democratic	New York	2026	present	New York Assembly (2026–present)	
Dom Moreno	Democratic	Colorado	2013	2023	Colorado House of Representatives (2013–2017); Colorado Senate (2017–2023); Senate Majority Leader (2022–2023)	
Marcia Morey	Democratic	North Carolina	2017	present	North Carolina House of Representatives (2017–present)	
Jason Morgan	Democratic	Michigan	2023	present	Michigan House of Representatives (2023–present)	
Eric Morrison	Democratic	Delaware	2021	present	Delaware House of Representatives (2021–present)	
Gail Morrison	Democratic	New Hampshire	1976	1980	New Hampshire House of Representatives (1976–1980, 2004–2008)	
Gail Morrison	Democratic	New Hampshire	2004	2008	New Hampshire House of Representatives (1976–1980, 2004–2008)	
Terry Morrison	Democratic	Maine	2008	2016	Maine House of Representatives (2008–2016)	
Jeremy Moss	Democratic	Michigan	2015	2027	Michigan House of Representatives (2015–2019); Michigan Senate (2019–2027); Senate President pro tempore (2023–2027)	
Sue Mullen	Democratic	New Hampshire	2018	2022	New Hampshire House of Representatives (2018–2022)	
Emma Mulvaney-Stanak	Progressive	Vermont	2021	2024	Vermont House of Representatives (2021–2024)	
Emma Mulvaney-Stanak	Democratic	Vermont	2021	2024	Vermont House of Representatives (2021–2024)	
Peter Murphy	Democratic	Maryland	2007	2015	Maryland House of Delegates (2007–2015)	
Alissandra Murray	Democratic	New Hampshire	2022	present	New Hampshire House of Representatives (2022–present)	
Ed Murray	Democratic	Washington	1995	2013	Washington House of Representatives (1995–2007); Washington Senate (2007–2013); Senate Minority Leader (2012–2013)	First openly gay minority leader in Washington and openly gay Mayor of Seattle
Melissa Murray	Democratic	Rhode Island	2019	present	Rhode Island Senate (2019–present)	
Garrett Muscatel	Democratic	New Hampshire	2018	2020	New Hampshire House of Representatives (2018–2020)	
Deborah Nardozzi	Democratic	Arizona	2024	2025	Arizona House of Representatives (2024–2025)	
Tony Navarrete	Democratic	Arizona	2017	2021	Arizona House of Representatives (2017–2019); Arizona Senate (2019–2021)	
DeShanna Neal	Democratic	Delaware	2023	present	Delaware House of Representatives (2023–present)	
Fabian Nelson	Democratic	Mississippi	2024	present	Mississippi House of Representatives (2024–present)	
Kameron Nelson	Democratic	South Dakota	2023	2025	South Dakota House of Representatives (2023–2025)	First gay man elected to South Dakota Legislature
Travis Nelson	Democratic	Oregon	2022	present	Oregon House of Representatives (2022–present)	
Donna Nesselbush	Democratic	Rhode Island	2011	2021	Rhode Island Senate (2011–2021)	
Greta Neubauer	Democratic	Wisconsin	2018	present	Wisconsin Assembly (2018–present); Assembly Minority Leader (2022–2027); Assembly Speaker (designate)	
Elaine Noble	Democratic	Massachusetts	1975	1979	Massachusetts House of Representatives (1975–1979)	First person out at their first election to a state legislature
Rob Nosse	Democratic	Oregon	2014	present	Oregon House of Representatives (2014–present)	
Todd Novak	Republican	Wisconsin	2015	2027	Wisconsin Assembly (2015–2027)	
Danny O'Donnell	Democratic	New York	2003	2025	New York Assembly (2003–2025)	
Andrea Olsen	Democratic	Montana	2015	present	Montana House of Representatives (2015–2023); Montana Senate (2023–present)	
Analise Ortiz	Democratic	Arizona	2023	present	Arizona House of Representatives (2023–2025); Arizona Senate (2025–present)	
David Ortiz	Democratic	Colorado	2021	2025	Colorado House of Representatives (2021–2025)	
Laurie Osher	Democratic	Maine	2020	present	Maine House of Representatives (2020–present)	
Blake Oshiro	Democratic	Hawaii	2001	2011	Hawaii House of Representatives (2001–2011); House Majority Leader (2008–2011)	After coming out in 2010, became first LGBTQ Majority Leader for the Hawaii House
Clare Oumou Verbeten	Democratic	Minnesota	2023	present	Minnesota Senate (2023–present)	One of two first openly-lesbian women elected to Minnesota Senate
Jeanette Oxford	Democratic	Missouri	2005	2013	Missouri House of Representatives (2005–2013)	
Gena Ozols	Democratic	Colorado	2027	Elect	Colorado House of Representatives (elect)	
Steve Padilla	Democratic	California	2022	present	California Senate (2022–present)	
David Paige	Democratic	New Hampshire	2022	present	New Hampshire House of Representatives (2022–present)	
Demi Palecek	Democratic	Illinois	2027	Elect	Illinois House of Representatives (elect)	
Nick Panagopoulos	Democratic	New Hampshire	2000	2002	New Hampshire House of Representatives (2000–2002)	
Jennifer Parenti	Democratic	Colorado	2023	2025	Colorado House of Representatives (2023–2025)	
Chris Pappas	Democratic	New Hampshire	2002	2006	New Hampshire House of Representatives (2002–2006)	
Zachary Parker	Democratic	District of Columbia	2023	present	D.C. Council (2023–present)	
Sam Park	Democratic	Georgia	2017	present	Georgia House of Representatives (2017–present)	First openly gay person to be elected in the Georgia General Assembly
Sarah Peake	Democratic	Massachusetts	2007	2024	Massachusetts House of Representatives (2007–2024)	
Ryan Pearson	Democratic	Rhode Island	2023	present	Rhode Island Senate (2013–present); Senate Majority Leader (2023–2025)	
Jamie Pedersen	Democratic	Washington	2007	present	Washington House of Representatives (2007–2013); Washington Senate (2013–present); Senate Majority Leader (2025–present)	
David Parks	Democratic	Nevada	1996	2020	Nevada Assembly (1996–2008); Nevada Senate (2008–2020)	First out LGBTQ official in Nevada
Sarah Pebworth	Democratic	Maine	2018	2022	Maine House of Representatives (2018–2022)	
John Pérez	Democratic	California	2008	2014	California Assembly (2008–2014); Assembly Speaker (2010–2014)	First openly LGBTQ Speaker of the California Assembly
Sasha Pérez	Democratic	California	2024	present	California Senate (2024–present)	
María Pérez-Vega	Democratic	Minnesota	2023	2027	Minnesota House of Representatives (2023–2027)	
Rebecca Perkins Kwoka	Democratic	New Hampshire	2020	present	New Hampshire Senate (2020–present); Senate Minority Leader (2024–2026); Senate President (designate)	
Luanne Peterpaul	Democratic	New Jersey	2024	present	New Jersey Assembly (2024–present)	
Adam Peters	Democratic	Iowa	2027	Elect	Iowa House of Representatives (elect)	
Sarah Peters	Democratic	Nevada	2018	2024	Nevada Assembly (2018–2024)	
Karen Peterson	Democratic	Delaware	2001	2017	Delaware Senate (2001–2017)	
Christian Phelps	Democratic	Wisconsin	2025	present	Wisconsin Assembly (2025–present)	
David Pierce	Democratic	New Hampshire	2006	2016	New Hampshire House of Representatives (2006–2012); New Hampshire Senate (2012–2016)	
Marie Pinkney	Democratic	Delaware	2021	present	Delaware Senate (2021–present)	
Mike Pisaturo	Democratic	Rhode Island	1997	2002	Rhode Island House of Representatives (1997–2002)	
Yoni Pizer	Democratic	Illinois	2020	2020	Illinois House of Representatives (2020)	
Mark Pocan	Democratic	Wisconsin	1999	2013	Wisconsin Assembly (1999–2013)	
Ed Poelstra	Republican	Arizona	2001	2003	Arizona House of Representatives (2001–2003)	
Laurie Pohutsky	Democratic	Michigan	2019	present	Michigan House of Representatives (2019–present); House Speaker pro tempore (2023–2025)	
Karin Power	Democratic	Oregon	2017	2022	Oregon House of Representatives (2017–2022)	
Judy Powers	Democratic	Maine	1996	2000	Maine House of Representatives (1996–2000)	Possibly one of first two out women in Maine legislature (with Donna Loring)
David Preece	Democratic	New Hampshire	2022	2026	New Hampshire House of Representatives (2022–2026)	
Monique Priestley	Democratic	Vermont	2023	present	Vermont House of Representatives (2023–2027); Vermont Senate (elect)	
Cia Price	Democratic	Virginia	2016	present	Virginia House of Delegates (2016–present)	
Mark Proctor	Democratic	Tennessee	2027	Elect	Tennessee House of Representatives (elect)	
Joshua Query	Democratic	New Hampshire	2018	2022	New Hampshire House of Representatives (2018–2022)	Openly genderqueer
Michael Quint	Democratic	Maine	1996	2002	Maine House of Representatives (1996–2002)	
Neil Rafferty	Democratic	Alabama	2018	present	Alabama House of Representatives (2018–present)	First openly gay man elected to Alabama state legislature
Aparna Raj	Democratic	District of Columbia	2027	Elect	D.C. Council (elect)	
Ambureen Rana	Democratic	Maine	2022	present	Maine House of Representatives (2022–present)	
Emily Randall	Democratic	Washington	2019	2024	Washington Senate (2019–2024)	
George Rawlings	Democratic	Virginia	1964	1970	Virginia House of Delegates (1964–1970)	Came out after leaving government.
Michele Rayner	Democratic	Florida	2020	2026	Florida House of Representatives (2020–2026)	First out Black queer woman elected to Florida Legislature
Greg Razer	Democratic	Missouri	2017	2024	Missouri House of Representatives (2017–2021); Missouri Senate (2021–2024)	
Lois Reckitt	Democratic	Maine	2016	2023	Maine House of Representatives (2016–2023)	
Steve Reed	Democratic	Pennsylvania	1975	1980	Pennsylvania House of Representatives (1975–1980)	
Liz Reyer	Democratic	Minnesota	2021	present	Minnesota House of Representatives (2021–2027); Minnesota Senate (elect)	
Mike Rice	Democratic	Vermont	2023	2025	Vermont House of Representatives (2023–2025)	
Dave Richardson	Democratic	Florida	2012	2018	Florida House of Representatives (2012–2018)	
Hedy Rijken	Democratic	Oregon	1989	1995	Oregon House of Representatives (1989–1995)	
Amaad Rivera	Democratic	Wisconsin	2025	present	Wisconsin Assembly (2025–present)	
Ana Rivera	Citizens' Victory; Movement	Puerto Rico	2021	2025	Puerto Rico Senate (2021–2025)	
Cheryl Rivera	Democratic	Massachusetts	1999	2014	Massachusetts House of Representatives (1999–2014)	
Jess Rivera	Democratic	North Carolina	2027	Elect	North Carolina Senate (elect)	
Mary Roberts	Democratic	Washington	2005	2015	Washington House of Representatives (2005–2015)	
Lamont Robinson	Democratic	Illinois	2019	2023	Illinois House of Representatives (2019–2023)	First out LGBTQ Black person elected to Illinois legislature
Kori Rodley	Democratic	Oregon	2027	Elect	Oregon House of Representatives (elect)	
Amy Roeder	Democratic	Maine	2020	present	Maine House of Representatives (2020–2027); Maine Senate (elect)	
Danica Roem	Democratic	Virginia	2018	present	Virginia House of Delegates (2018–2024); Virginia Senate (2024–present)	First openly trans state legislator in the U.S.
James Roesener	Democratic	New Hampshire	2022	2026	New Hampshire House of Representatives (2022–2026)	First trans man elected to a state legislature
Brian Romero	Democratic	New York	2027	Elect	New York Assembly (elect)	
Sam Rosemark	Democratic	Minnesota	2027	Elect	Minnesota Senate (elect)	
Stan Rosenberg	Democratic	Massachusetts	1987	2018	Massachusetts House of Representatives (1987–1991); Massachusetts Senate (1991–2018); Senate President pro tempore (2003–2013); Senate Majority Leadaer (2013–2015); Senate President (2015–2017)	First out Senate Majority Leader in Massachusetts
Paul Rosenthal	Democratic	Colorado	2013	2019	Colorado House of Representatives (2013–2019)	
Mitch Rosenwald	Democratic	Florida	2024	present	Florida House of Representatives (2024–present)	
Skyler Rude	Republican	Washington	2019	2026	Washington House of Representatives (2019–2026)	
Deb Ruggiero	Democratic	Rhode Island	2009	2023	Rhode Island House of Representatives (2009–2023)	
Susan Ruiz	Democratic	Kansas	2019	present	Kansas House of Representatives (2019–present)	
Herb Russell	Democratic	Vermont	2011	2017	Vermont House of Representatives (2011–2017)	
Illapa Sairitupac	Democratic	New York	2027	Elect	New York Assembly (elect)	
Luis Salazar	Democratic	Florida	2026	Elect	Florida House of Representatives (elect)	
Gabby Salinas	Democratic	Tennessee	2025	2027	Tennessee House of Representatives (2025–2027)	
Abigail Salisbury	Democratic	Pennsylvania	2023	present	Pennsylvania House of Representatives (2023–present)	
Mathewos Samson	Democratic	Georgia	2027	Elect	Georgia House of Representatives (elect)	
Chris Sander	Democratic	Missouri	2021	2025	Missouri House of Representatives (2021–2025)	
Diane Sands	Democratic	Montana	1997	1999	Montana House of Representatives (1997–1999, 2007–2013)	First openly LGBTQ person elected to Montana Legislature
Diane Sands	Democratic	Montana	2007	2013	Montana House of Representatives (1997–1999, 2007–2013)	First openly LGBTQ person elected to Montana Legislature
Diane Sands	Democratic	Montana	2015	2023	Montana Senate (2015–2023)	First openly LGBTQ person elected to Montana Legislature
Janelle Sarauw	Democratic	Virgin Islands	2017	2023	Virgin Islands Legislature (2017–2023)	
Greg Sargent	Democratic	New Hampshire	2024	present	New Hampshire House of Representatives (2024–present)	
Ellie Sato	Democratic	Maine	2024	2026	Maine House of Representatives (2024–2026)	
Joe Saunders	Democratic	Florida	2012	2014	Florida House of Representatives (2012–2014)	
Adam Scanlon	Democratic	Massachusetts	2021	present	Massachusetts House of Representatives (2021–present)	
Sue Schafer	Democratic	Colorado	2009	2015	Colorado House of Representatives (2009–2015)	
Melanie Scheible	Democratic	Nevada	2018	present	Nevada Senate (2018–present)	
Aaron Schock	Republican	Illinois	2005	2009	Illinois House of Representatives (2005–2009)	Came out after leaving government.
Kyrstin Schuette	Democratic	Minnesota	2027	Elect	Minnesota House of Representatives (elect)	
Carl Sciortino	Democratic	Massachusetts	2005	2014	Massachusetts House of Representatives (2005–2014)	
Ernesto Scorsone	Democratic	Kentucky	1985	2008	Kentucky House of Representatives (1985–1996); Kentucky Senate (1996–2008)	Came out in 2003.
Greg Scott	Democratic	Pennsylvania	2023	present	Pennsylvania House of Representatives (2023–present)	
Jaelynn Scott	Democratic	Washington	2027	Elect	Washington House of Representatives (elect)	
Penny Severns	Democratic	Illinois	1987	1998	Illinois Senate (1987–1998)	Posthumously outed.
Chris Sgro	Democratic	North Carolina	2016	2017	North Carolina House of Representatives (2016–2017)	
MJ Shannon	Democratic	Connecticut	2025	present	Connecticut House of Representatives (2025–present)	
Renitta Shannon	Democratic	Georgia	2017	2023	Georgia House of Representatives (2017–2023)	First bisexual elected to Georgia House
Joe Shekarchi	Democratic	Rhode Island	2013	2027	Rhode Island House of Representatives (2013–2027); House Majority Leader (2017–2021); House Speaker (2021–2026)	
George Sheldon	Democratic	Florida	1974	1982	Florida House of Representatives (1974–1982)	
Gail Shibley	Democratic	Oregon	1991	1997	Oregon House of Representatives (1991–1997)	First out LGBTQ lawmaker in Oregon
Lauren Simmons	Democratic	Texas	2025	present	Texas House of Representatives (2025–present)	
Mike Simmons	Democratic	Illinois	2021	present	Illinois Senate (2021–present)	
Mark Sickles	Democratic	Virginia	2004	2026	Virginia House of Delegates (2004–2026)	
Meagan Simonaire	Republican (2015–2018)	Maryland	2015	2019	Maryland House of Delegates (2015–2019)	Bisexual
Meagan Simonaire	Democratic (2018–2019)	Maryland	2015	2019	Maryland House of Delegates (2015–2019)	Bisexual
Tony Simone	Democratic	New York	2023	present	New York Assembly (2023–present)	
Brian Sims	Democratic	Pennsylvania	2012	2022	Pennsylvania House of Representatives (2012–2022)	First openly gay person elected to the Pennsylvania General Assembly
Kyrsten Sinema	Democratic	Arizona	2005	2012	Arizona House of Representatives (2005–2011); Arizona Senate (2011–2012)	Openly bisexual
Stephen Skinner	Democratic	West Virginia	2013	2017	West Virginia House of Delegates (2013–2017)	First openly LGBTQ person elected to West Virginia legislature
Charles Skold	Democratic	Maine	2022	2026	Maine House of Representatives (2022–2026)	
Taylor Small	Progressive	Vermont	2021	2025	Vermont House of Representatives (2021–2025)	First openly trans member of the Vermont House of Representatives
Taylor Small	Democratic	Vermont	2021	2025	Vermont House of Representatives (2021–2025)	First openly trans member of the Vermont House of Representatives
Carlos Smith	Democratic	Florida	2016	2022	Florida House of Representatives (2016–2022)	First openly LGBTQ Latino person elected to the Florida Legislature.
Carlos Smith	Democratic	Florida	2024	present	Florida Senate (2024–present)	First openly LGBTQ Latino person elected to the Florida Legislature.
Izzy Smith-Wade-El	Democratic	Pennsylvania	2022	present	Pennsylvania House of Representatives (2022–present)	
Tim Sneller	Democratic	Michigan	2017	2023	Michigan House of Representatives (2017–2023)	
Lee Snodgrass	Democratic	Wisconsin	2021	present	Wisconsin Assembly (2021–present)	
Claire Snyder-Hall	Democratic	Delaware	2025	present	Delaware House of Representatives (2025–present)	
José Solache	Democratic	California	2024	present	California Assembly (2024–present)	
Felipe Sousa-Lazaballet	Democratic	Florida	2026	Elect	Florida House of Representatives (elect)	
Ryan Spaude	Democratic	Wisconsin	2025	present	Wisconsin Assembly (2025–present)	
Allan Spear	Democratic	Minnesota	1973	2001	Minnesota Senate (1973–2001); Senate President (1993–2001)	Came out in 1974 as the first openly LGBTQ person to serve in a state legislature and first out state legislature's presiding officer.
Pat Spearman	Democratic	Nevada	2012	2024	Nevada Senate (2012–2024); Senate President pro tempore (2022–2024)	First out lesbian in the Nevada Legislature
Jim Splaine	Democratic	New Hampshire	1968	1970	New Hampshire House of Representatives (1968–1970)	
Jim Splaine	Democratic	New Hampshire	1972	1984	New Hampshire House of Representatives (1972–1978); New Hampshire Senate (1978–1984)	
Jim Splaine	Democratic	New Hampshire	1994	1996	New Hampshire House of Representatives (1994–1996, 1998–2010)	
Jim Splaine	Democratic	New Hampshire	1998	2010	New Hampshire House of Representatives (1994–1996, 1998–2010)	
Mark Spreitzer	Democratic	Wisconsin	2015	present	Wisconsin Assembly (2011–2023); Wisconsin Senate (2023–present); Senate President (designate)	
Ashlei Spivey	Democratic	Nebraska	2025	present	Nebraska Legislature (2025–present)	
Ron Squires	Democratic	Vermont	1991	1993	Vermont House of Representatives (1991–1993)	
Pat Steadman	Democratic	Colorado	2009	2017	Colorado Senate (2009–2017)	
Liz Stefanics	Democratic	New Mexico	1993	1997	New Mexico Senate (1993–1997, 2017–present)	
Liz Stefanics	Democratic	New Mexico	2017	present	New Mexico Senate (1993–1997, 2017–present)	
Elizabeth Steiner	Democratic	Oregon	2021	2024	Oregon Senate (2021–2024)	
Drew Stensland	Democratic	Iowa	2027	Elect	Iowa House of Representatives (elect)	
Zack Stephenson	Democratic	Minnesota	2019	present	Minnesota House of Representatives (2019–present); House Minority Leader (2025–2027); House Speaker (designate)	
Mary-Katherine Stone	Democratic	Vermont	2023	2027	Vermont House of Representatives (2023–2027)	
Wally Straughn	Democratic	Arizona	2003	2005	Arizona House of Representatives (2003–2005)	
Angela Stroud	Democratic	Wisconsin	2025	present	Wisconsin Assembly (2025–present)	
Laura Sturgeon	Democratic	Delaware	2019	present	Delaware Senate (2019–present)	
Jared Sullivan	Democratic	New Hampshire	2022	present	New Hampshire House of Representatives (2022–present)	
Heather Surprenant	Democratic	Vermont	2021	2025	Vermont House of Representatives (2021–2025)	
Adrian Tam	Democratic	Hawaii	2020	present	Hawaii House of Representatives (2020–present)	
Linda Tanner	Democratic	New Hampshire	2012	2014	New Hampshire House of Representatives (2012–2014, 2016–2024)	
Linda Tanner	Democratic	New Hampshire	2016	2024	New Hampshire House of Representatives (2012–2014, 2016–2024)	
Rashad Taylor	Democratic	Georgia	2009	2013	Georgia House of Representatives (2009–2013)	First openly gay person to serve in the Georgia General Assembly, second gay black man to serve in any state legislature. Came out in 2011.
Arlando Teller	Democratic	Arizona	2019	2021	Arizona House of Representatives (2019–2021)	
Robert Theberge	Democratic (2002–2017)	New Hampshire	2002	2018	New Hampshire House of Representatives (2002–2018, 2020–2022)	
Robert Theberge	Republican (2017–2022)	New Hampshire	2020	2022	New Hampshire House of Representatives (2002–2018, 2020–2022)	
Wick Thomas	Democratic	Missouri	2025	present	Missouri House of Representatives (2025–present)	
Cody Thompson	Democratic	West Virginia	2018	2022	West Virginia House of Delegates (2018–2022)	
Robert Thompson (Note: Thompson was elected to another term to the New Hampshire House in 2012 but resigned before taking office.)	Democratic	New Hampshire	2008	2010	New Hampshire House of Representatives (2008–2010)	
Sharon Thompson	Democratic	North Carolina	1989	1991	North Carolina House of Representatives (1987–1991)	
Christa Tichy	Democratic	Maryland	2027	Elect	Maryland House of Delegates (elect)	
Richard Tisei	Republican	Massachusetts	1985	2011	Massachusetts House of Representatives (1985–1991); Massachusetts Senate (1991–2011); Senate Minority Leader (2007–2011)	Came out as gay in 2010. Lived with his partner, Bernie Starr, since 1994; they married in 2013
Brianna Titone	Democratic	Colorado	2019	2027	Colorado House of Representatives (2019–2027)	
Matt Titone	Democratic	New York	2007	2019	New York Assembly (2007–2019)	
Patricia Todd	Democratic	Alabama	2006	2018	Alabama House of Representatives (2006–2018)	First openly LGBTQ person to serve in the Alabama Legislature
Art Torres	Democratic	California	1974	1994	California Assembly (1974–1982); California Senate (1982–1994)	Came out after leaving government.
Susan Tracy	Democratic	Massachusetts	1991	1995	Massachusetts Senate (1991–1995)	
Matt Trieber	Democratic	Vermont	2011	2020	Vermont House of Representatives (2011–2020)	
Rick Trombly	Democratic	New Hampshire	1978	1984	New Hampshire House of Representatives (1978–1984)	First openly gay state legislator elected in New Hampshire
Rick Trombly	Democratic	New Hampshire	1986	2000	New Hampshire House of Representatives (1986–1998); New Hampshire Senate (1998–2000)	First openly gay state legislator elected in New Hampshire
Alisson Turcotte	Democratic	New Hampshire	2012	2020	New Hampshire House of Representatives (2012–2020, 2022–2024)	Came out as trans between terms.
Alisson Turcotte	Democratic	New Hampshire	2022	2024	New Hampshire House of Representatives (2012–2020, 2022–2024)	Came out as trans between terms.
Mo Turner	Democratic	Oklahoma	2020	2024	Oklahoma House of Representatives (2020–2024)	First openly non-binary state legislator in U.S. history
Randy Udell	Democratic	Wisconsin	2025	present	Wisconsin Assembly (2025–present)	
Nicole Uhre-Balk	Democratic	South Dakota	2025	present	South Dakota House of Representatives (2025–present)	
Jessie Ulibarri	Democratic	Colorado	2013	2017	Colorado Senate (2013–2017)	
Dave Upthegrove	Democratic	Washington	2002	2013	Washington House of Representatives (2002–2013)	
Alex Valdez	Democratic	Colorado	2019	2027	Colorado House of Representatives (2019–2027)	
Steve Vaillancourt	Democratic (1996–2000)	New Hampshire	1996	2014	New Hampshire House of Representatives (1996–2014, 2016–2017)	
Steve Vaillancourt	Republican (2000–2017)	New Hampshire	1996	2014	New Hampshire House of Representatives (1996–2014, 2016–2017)	
Steve Vaillancourt	Republican (2000–2017)	New Hampshire	2016	2017	New Hampshire House of Representatives (1996–2014, 2016–2017)	
Tim Van Zandt	Democratic	Missouri	1995	2003	Missouri House of Representatives (1995–2003)	First out LGBTQ person elected to Missouri General Assembly
Monica VanBuskirk	Democratic	Colorado	2027	Elect	Colorado House of Representatives (elect)	
Jennifer Veiga	Democratic	Colorado	1997	2009	Colorado House of Representatives (1997–2003); Colorado Senate (2003–2009)	First openly gay member of Colorado legislature after coming out in 2002
Elizabeth Velasco	Democratic	Colorado	2023	present	Colorado House of Representatives (2023–present)	
Steph Vigil	Democratic	Colorado	2023	2025	Colorado House of Representatives (2023–2025)	First openly Queer elected official from El Paso County, CO
Samuel Vilchez Santiago	Democratic	Florida	2026	Elect	Florida House of Representatives (elect)	
Joe Vogel	Democratic	Maryland	2023	present	Maryland House of Delegates (2023–present)	
Tanya Vyhovsky	Democratic	Vermont	2021	present	Vermont House of Representatives (2021–2023); Vermont Senate (2023–present)	
Alice Wade	Democratic	New Hampshire	2024	present	New Hampshire House of Representatives (2024–present)	
Keisha Waites	Democratic	Georgia	2012	2017	Georgia House of Representatives (2012–2017)	
Danielle Walker	Democratic	West Virginia	2018	2023	West Virginia House of Delegates (2018–2023)	
Brady Walkinshaw	Democratic	Washington	2013	2017	Washington House of Representatives (2013–2017)	
Chris Ward	Democratic	California	2020	present	California Assembly (2020–present); Assembly Speaker pro tempore (2022–2023)	
Charlotte Warren	Democratic	Maine	2014	2022	Maine House of Representatives (2014–2022)	
Mary Washington	Democratic	Maryland	2011	present	Maryland House of Delegates (2011–2019); Maryland Senate (2019–present)	
Jennifer Webb	Democratic	Florida	2018	2020	Florida House of Representatives (2018–2020)	
Kathy Webb	Democratic	Arkansas	2007	2013	Arkansas House of Representatives (2007–2013)	First out state legislator in Arkansas
Jim West	Republican	Washington	1983	2003	Washington House of Representatives (1983–1987); Washington Senate (1987–2003); Senate Minority Leader (2000–2003); Senate Majority Leader (2003)	Outed while serving as mayor.
Joyce Weston	Democratic	New Hampshire	2018	2022	New Hampshire House of Representatives (2018–2022)	
Joanna Whaley	Democratic	Michigan	2027	Elect	Michigan House of Representatives (elect)	
Becca White	Democratic	Vermont	2019	present	Vermont House of Representatives (2019–2023); Vermont Senate (2023–present)	
Aime Wichtendahl	Democratic	Iowa	2025	present	Iowa House of Representatives (2025–present)	
Scott Wiener	Democratic	California	2016	2027	California Senate (2016–2027)	
Carol Williams	Democratic	New Hampshire	1996	2002	New Hampshire House of Representatives (1996–2002, 2008–2010, 2012–2014)	
Carol Williams	Democratic	New Hampshire	2008	2010	New Hampshire House of Representatives (1996–2002, 2008–2010, 2012–2014)	
Carol Williams	Democratic	New Hampshire	2012	2014	New Hampshire House of Representatives (1996–2002, 2008–2010, 2012–2014)	
Claire Wilson	Democratic	Washington	2019	present	Washington Senate (2019–present)	
Matthew Wilson	Democratic	Georgia	2019	2023	Georgia House of Representatives (2019–2023)	
Suzi Wizowaty	Democratic	Vermont	2011	2015	Vermont House of Representatives (2011–2015)	
Barb Wood	Democratic	Maine	2020	2022	Maine House of Representatives (2020–2022)	
Brandon Woodard	Democratic	Kansas	2019	present	Kansas House of Representatives (2019–present); House Minority Leader (2025–present)	First openly gay member of the Kansas House of Representatives
Gabe Woolley	Republican	Oklahoma	2024	present	Oklahoma House of Representatives (2024–present)	
Teresa Woorman	Democratic	Maryland	2024	present	Maryland House of Delegates (2024–present)	
Cynthia Wooten	Democratic	Oregon	1993	1999	Oregon House of Representatives (1993–1999)	
Zach Wyatt	Republican	Missouri	2011	2013	Missouri House of Representatives (2011–2013)	
Sam Yingling	Democratic	Illinois	2013	2023	Illinois House of Representatives (2013–2023)	
Kayla Young	Democratic	West Virginia	2020	present	West Virginia House of Delegates (2020–present)	
JoCasta Zamarripa	Democratic	Wisconsin	2011	2021	Wisconsin Assembly (2011–2021)	
Rick Zbur	Democratic	California	2022	present	California Assembly (2022–present)	
Zooey Zephyr	Democratic	Montana	2023	present	Montana House of Representatives (2023–present)	First trans woman elected to Montana Legislature
Erin Zwiener	Democratic	Texas	2019	present	Texas House of Representatives (2019–present)	
Dan Zwonitzer	Republican	Wyoming	2005	2025	Wyoming House of Representatives (2005–2025)	Openly gay

== Local ==
=== Local Executive ===
Name		Party	State / Territory	Office(s)	Notes
	Sam Adams	Democratic	Oregon	Mayor of Portland, Oregon (2009–2012)	First gay mayor of Portland and first mayor of the 30 most populous U.S. cities
	Pete Buttigieg	Democratic	Indiana	Mayor of South Bend (2012–2020)	Came out as gay in 2015, and married Chasten Glezman in 2018
	Christopher Cabaldon	Democratic (Note: Office is elected on a nonpartisan basis but the person in question publicly identifies with a political party.)	California	Mayor of West Sacramento (1998–2020)	Openly gay
	Bill Crews	Republican	Iowa	Mayor of Melbourne, Iowa (1984–1998)	Possibly first out LGBTQ elected official in Iowa
	Edgardo Cruz Vélez		Puerto Rico	Mayor of Guánica, Puerto Rico (2021–present)	First Puerto Rican mayor elected as a write-in candidate
	Guyleen Castriotta		Colorado	Mayor of City and County of Broomfield, Colorado (2021–present)	
	Betsy Driver	Democratic	New Jersey	Mayor of Flemington (2019–present)	First openly intersex elected mayor in the United States
	Jenny Durkan	Democratic	Washington	Mayor of Seattle (2017–2021)	Seattle's first lesbian mayor
	Tim Eustace	Democratic	New Jersey	Mayor of Maywood (2008–2011)	Openly gay
	Robert Garcia	Democratic	California	Mayor of Long Beach (2014–2022)	First LGBTQ and Latino person to hold the office
	Neil Giuliano	Republican	Arizona	Mayor of Tempe (1994–2004)	One of directly elected openly gay mayors in the United States and one of first out LGBTQ republican officials
	Todd Gloria	Democratic	California	Mayor of San Diego (2020–present)	First openly gay and first Person of Color to serve as mayor of San Diego
	Jim Gray	Democratic	Kentucky	Mayor of Lexington (2011–2019)	First openly gay mayor of Lexington
	Reed Gusciora	Democratic	New Jersey	Mayor of Trenton (2018–present)	
	Richard A. Heyman		Florida	Mayor of Key West (1983–1985, 1987–1989)	First out directly elected mayor in the United States
	Clare Higgins	Democratic	Massachusetts	Mayor of Northampton, Massachusetts (1999–2011)	Possibly first openly LGBTQ Mayor in Massachusetts
	Ed Koch	Democratic	New York	Mayor of New York City (1978–1989)	Posthumously identified as gay by The New York Times
	Sheila Kuehl	Democratic	California	Los Angeles Board of Supervisors (2014–present); Chair of Los Angeles County (2017–2018)	
	Susan Leal	Democratic	California	Treasurer of San Francisco (1997–2004)	One of the first out LGBTQ treasurers of a major city
	Lori Lightfoot	Democratic	Illinois	Mayor of Chicago (2019–2023)	Openly lesbian
	Miguel Méndez Pérez	Popular Democratic	Puerto Rico	Mayor of Isabela, Puerto Rico (2021–present)	
	Lisa Middleton	Democratic	California	Mayor of Palm Springs, California (2021–present)	First openly transgender mayor in California
	Ed Murray	Democratic	Washington	Mayor of Seattle (2013–2017)	First openly gay minority leader in Washington and openly gay Mayor of Seattle
	Michael R. Nelson	Democratic	North Carolina	Mayor of Carrboro, North Carolina (1995–2005)	
	Ron Oden	Democratic	California	Mayor of Palm Springs, California (2003–2007)	First openly gay Black mayor in the United States
	Liz Ordiales	Nonpartisan	Georgia	Mayor of Hiawassee (2017–present)	Openly lesbian mayor
	Annise Parker	Democratic	Texas	Mayor of Houston (2010–2016)	First openly LGBTQ mayor of a top 10 American city (by population)
	Ty Penserga	Democratic	Florida	Mayor of Boynton Beach, Florida (2022–present)	
	Kenneth Reeves	Democratic	Massachusetts	Mayor of Cambridge, Massachusetts (1992–1995, 2006–2007)	First openly gay Black person to serve as Mayor in the United States
Satya Rhodes-Conway	Satya Rhodes-Conway	Democratic	Wisconsin	Mayor of Madison, Wisconsin (2019–present)	First openly LGBTQ and lesbian Mayor of Madison, Wisconsin
	E. Denise Simmons		Massachusetts	Mayor of Cambridge, Massachusetts (2008–2010, 2016–2018)	First openly Black lesbian mayor in the United States

=== Local Legislative ===
Name	Party	State / Territory	Office(s)	Notes
Mark Aguirre		Delaware	Rehoboth Beach City Commission (2003-?)	First out city council member elected in Delaware and one of first out Delaware officials
Liliana Bakhtiari	Democratic	Georgia	Atlanta City Council (2022–present)	First openly queer Muslim elected in Georgia
Mark Bonne	Democratic	Illinois	Rockford City Council (2021–present)	First openly gay elected official in Winnebago County
Harry Britt	Democratic	California	San Francisco Board of Supervisors (1979–1993); President (1989–1990)	First openly gay city council president
Joel Burns		Texas	Fort Worth City Council (2008–2014)	First openly gay person elected to office in Fort Worth and Tarrant County
Patti Bushee		New Mexico	Santa Fe City Council (1992–2011)	Possibly first out LGBTQ person to serve New Mexico
David Carr	Republican	New York	New York City Councilman (2021–present)	First openly LGBTQ Republican elected to office in New York City
Christopher Constant	Democratic	Alaska	Anchorage Assembly (2017–present)	With Felix Rivera, one of first openly LGBTQ officials elected in Alaska
Joanne Conte	Independent	Colorado	Arvada City Council (1991–1995)	Considered to be first openly transgender person elected to a City Council in the United States
Phillipe Cunningham	Democratic	Minnesota	Minneapolis City Councilman from the 4th Ward (2018–2022)	Along with Andrea Jenkins, became the first openly transgender black elected officials in the U.S. and the first trans man
Brian Coyle		Minnesota	Minneapolis City Council (1984–1991)	Possibly first out LGBTQ Councilmember of Minneapolis
Carl DeMaio	Republican	California	San Diego City Council (2008–2012)	First openly gay man to San Diego Council
Betsy Driver	Democratic	New Jersey	Flemington, New Jersey Councillor (2017–2019)	First openly intersex elected official in the United States
Thomas Duane	Democratic	New York	New York City Council (1992–1998)	With Antonio Pagán, one of the two first openly gay members of the New York City Council
Louis Escobar	Democratic	Ohio	Toledo City Council (1998–2006); Council President (Unknown dates)	First LGBTQ person and Latino elected to serve on Toledo City Council One of first council members for a major city in Ohio (with Mary Wiseman)
Tim Eustace	Democratic	New Jersey	Maywood Borough Councilman (1995–1997, 2001–2008); Maywood Borough Council President (2005–2008)	Openly gay
Jay Fisette	Democratic	Virginia	Arlington County Board (1998–2017)	First openly gay elected official in Virginia
Stormie Forte	Democratic	North Carolina	Raleigh City Council (2020–present)	First Black woman and openly LGBTQ woman elected to Raleigh, NC Council
Theresa Gadus	Democratic	Ohio	Toledo City Council (2021–present)	First openly LGBTQ woman elected to Toledo City Council
Althea Garrison	Independent	Massachusetts	Boston City Council councilor at-large (2019–2020) (Note: Boston ordinance provides that when an at-large city council becomes vacant, the next largest vote getter is appointed for the remainder of the term. When Ayanna Pressley resigned to take her seat in Congress, Garrison, as the 5th largest vote-getter in 2017, received the appointment. She was defeated in her bid for a full term in 2019.)	Forcibly outed as transgender during her service in the Massachusetts House of Representatives
Alberto Giménez		Puerto Rico	San Juan City Council (2021–present)	
Ricardo Gonzalez	Democratic	Wisconsin	Madison Common Council (1989–2000)	First openly gay Latino person elected to public office in the United States and possibly first out city council member for Madison, Wisconsin
Maria Hadden	Democratic	Illinois	Chicago City Council (2019–present)	First openly queer woman of color elected to Chicago City Council
Steve Hansen	Democratic	California	Sacramento City Council (2012–2020)	First openly gay member of Sacramento city council
Shannon Hardin	Democratic	Ohio	Columbus City Council (2014–present); Columbus City Council President (2018–present)	First Black LGBTQ member of Columbus City Council and first openly LGBTQ Council President
Sherry Harris		Washington	Seattle City Council (1992–1995)	First openly gay Black woman elected to public office in the U.S.
Mary Jo Hudson	Democratic	Ohio	Columbus City Council (2004–2007)	First openly LGBTQ member and LGBTQ woman to serve on Columbus City Council
Andrea Jenkins	Democratic	Minnesota	Minneapolis City Councilwoman from the 8th Ward (2018–present); Vice President of the City Council (2018–2022); President of the City Council (2022–2024)	Along with Phillipe Cunningham, became the first openly transgender black elected official in the U.S. and the first trans woman
Corey Johnson	Democratic	New York	New York City Councilman (2014–present); Speaker of the New York City Council (2019–present)	Openly gay, openly HIV-positive; First gay man to hold the speakership of the New York City Council
Jolie Justus	Democratic	Missouri	City Council of Kansas City, Missouri (2015–2020)	
Christine Kehoe	Democratic	California	San Diego City Council (1993–2000); California State Assembly (2000–2004); California Senate (2004–2012)	First openly LGBTQ official in San Diego
Bruce Kraus	Democratic	Pennsylvania	Pittsburgh City Council Member (2008–present); President (2014–2020)	First openly gay elected official in Pittsburgh, Pennsylvania
Robert Lilligren	Democratic	Minnesota	Minneapolis City Council (2002–2014)	First Native American elected to Minneapolis City Council and one of first openly gay members
Ray Lopez	Democratic	Illinois	Chicago City Council (2015–present)	First LGBTQ Latino elected to Chicago City Council along with Carlos Ramirez-Rosa
John Loza	Democratic	Texas	Dallas City Council (1998–2016)	First openly LGBTQ city council member for a major city in Texas, alongside Annise Parker (Houston)
Rebecca Maurer	Democratic	Ohio	Cleveland City Council (2022–present)	First openly LGBTQ woman elected to Cleveland City Council
Jim McGill		Pennsylvania	Wilkinsburg City Council (1994–2002)	First openly LGBTQ city council member in Pennsylvania
Kerry McCormack	Democratic	Ohio	Cleveland City Council (2016–present)	First out LGBTQ party leader of the Cleveland City Council
Jonathan Melton	Democratic	North Carolina	Raleigh City Council (2019–present)	One of first two openly LGBTQ members of Raleigh City Council
Carlos Menchaca	Democratic	New York	New York City Council (2014–2021)	First LGBTQ New York Councilmember from Brooklyn and first Mexican-American Councilmember for New York City
Steven Morabito	Democratic	Massachusetts	Revere City Councillor (2013–present)	First Gay man elected to Revere, MA City Council
Chi Ossé	Democratic	New York	New York City Councilman (2022–present)	Identifies as queer
Antonio Pagán	Democratic	New York	New York City Council (1992–1997)	With Thomas Duane, one of the two first openly gay members of the New York City Council
Annise Parker	Democratic	Texas	Houston City Council, at-large member (1998–2004)	First openly LGBTQ council member for a major city in Texas, alongside John Loza (Dallas)
Pedro Peters Maldonado	Popular Democratic	Puerto Rico	San Juan City Council (2012–?)	First openly gay politician elected to public office in the island's history
Christine Quinn	Democratic	New York	New York City Councilwoman (1999–2013); Speaker of the New York City Council (2006–2013)	Openly lesbian First LGBTQ person to hold the speakership of the New York City Council
Carlos Ramirez-Rosa	Democratic	Illinois	Chicago City Council (2015–present)	First LGBTQ Latino elected to Chicago City Council along with Raymond Lopez
Phil Reed	Democratic	New York	New York City Council (1998–2005)	First openly gay African-American person elected to New York City Council
Darden Rice	Democratic	Florida	St. Petersburg City Councilwoman, District 4 (2014–present); Vice Chair of St. Petersburg City Council (2016); Chair of St. Petersburg City Council (2017)	First openly LGBTQ candidate to run for office in Pinellas County, Florida
Felix Rivera	Democratic	Alaska	Anchorage Assembly (2017–present)	One of first two LGBTQ elected officials in Alaska
Bill Rosendahl	Democratic	California	Los Angeles City Council (2005–2013)	First openly gay person elected to Los Angeles City Council
Jim Roth	Democratic	Oklahoma	Oklahoma County Commission (2003–2007)	First out official elected in Oklahoma
Dan Ryan	Democratic	Oregon	Portland City Council (2020–present)	First HIV-positive person elected to Portland City Council
Chris Seelbach	Democratic	Ohio	Cincinnati City Council (2011–present)	First openly gay politician elected to Cincinnati City Council
Patty Sheehan	Democratic	Florida	Orlando City Commission (2000–present)	First out official in Orlando
Evelyn Rios Stafford	Democratic	Arkansas	Justice of the Peace, Washington County (2021–present)	First trans woman elected in Arkansas and one of first elected Latina women in the state
Keith St. John	Democratic	New York	Albany Common Council (1990–1998)	First out LGBTQ Black person elected to public office in the United States
E. Denise Simmons	Democratic	Massachusetts	Cambridge, Massachusetts City Council (2002–present)	
Ritchie Torres	Democratic	New York	New York City Councilman (2014–2020)	Openly gay
Tom Tunney	Democratic	Illinois	Chicago City Council (2003–2023); Vice Mayor of Chicago (2019–2023)	First openly gay Chicago City Council Alderman and Vice Mayor of Chicago
Lawrence Webb		Virginia	Falls Church, Virginia City Council (unknown dates)	First out Black gay official in Virginia
Bruce Williams	Democratic	Maryland	City Council of Takoma Park (1994–2008); Mayor of Takoma Park (2008–2015)	First openly gay elected official in Maryland
Mary Wiseman	Democratic	Ohio	Dayton City Commission (1998–2002)	One of first out council members for a major Ohio city (with Louis Escobar)
Barbara Wood	Democratic	Maine	Portland, Maine City Council (1988-?)	First out LGBTQ officeholder in Maine
Cathy Woolard	Democratic	Georgia	Atlanta City Council (1998–2004); Council President (2002–2004)	First openly LGBTQ elected official in Georgia and first woman as Atlanta City Council President
Ken Yeager	Democratic	California	San Jose City Council (2000–2006); Santa Clara County Board of Supervisors (2006–present)	First out city council member in San Jose
Steve Zemo	Republican	Connecticut	Board of Selectmen of Ridgefield, Connecticut (1996–1998, 2000–2006)	One of first elected out LGBTQ officials for Connecticut
Steve Zemo	Democratic	Connecticut	Board of Selectmen of Ridgefield, Connecticut (1996–1998, 2000–2006)	One of first elected out LGBTQ officials for Connecticut

== See also ==
- LGBT conservatism in the United States
- List of non-binary political office-holders
- List of transgender public officeholders in the United States
- List of first openly LGBT politicians in the United States
