= Tommy Hoyt =

American politician

Member of the New Hampshire House of Representatives from the Grafton 7th district
- In office December 7, 2022 – December 4, 2024
- Succeeded by: Janet Lucas

Personal details
- Party: Democratic

Tommy Hoyt is an American politician. He served as a Democratic member for the Grafton 7th district of the New Hampshire House of Representatives.
