= Daniel Shagoury =

American politician

Member of the Maine House of Representatives from the 55th district
- Incumbent
- Assumed office December 7, 2022
- Preceded by: Seth Berry
- Succeeded by: Maureen AuCoin (elect)

Personal details
- Born: 1957 or 1958 (age 68–69)
- Party: Democratic
- Spouse: Juliet
- Children: 2
- Education: Bachelor of Arts, Master of Arts
- Alma mater: Colby College, George Washington University
- Profession: Legislative assistant

Daniel Shagoury (born 1981 or 1982) is an American politician who has served as a member of the Maine House of Representatives since December 7, 2022. He represents Maine's 55th House district. He has previously worked as a legislative assistant in the house for 19 years.

== Electoral history ==
He was elected on November 8, 2022, in the 2022 Maine House of Representatives election against Republican opponent Phillip Wiseman. He assumed office on December 7, 2022.

== Biography ==
Shagoury earned a Bachelor of Arts in history from Colby College in 1982 and a Master of Arts in international relations from George Washington University in 1987.

Maine House of Representatives
Preceded by Seth Berry	Member of the Maine House of Representatives; 2022–present	Succeeded by incumbent
