= Nancy Hetherington =

American politician

Member of the Rhode Island House of Representatives from the 28th district
- In office 1994–2002

Personal details
- Party: Democratic

Nancy Hetherington is a former American politician, who served in the Rhode Island House of Representatives from 1994 to 2002.

Toward the end of her term in office, Hetherington came out as lesbian in an op-ed written to support a civil unions bill she had introduced in the legislature, becoming the first out lesbian to serve in the state house. She retired from office in 2002.

Prior to her election to the legislature, Hetherington was a social worker and an ordained Methodist minister.
