= Mary Anne Guggenheim =

American politician and medical professor

- Born: November 11, 1935 (age 90); La Grande, Oregon
- Education: Willamette University; University of Wisconsin; Harvard Medical School; Case Western Reserve University
- Awards: Roger and Mary Brumback Lifetime Achievement Award
- Scientific career
- Fields: neurology; pediatrics; virology; pathology
- Workplaces: University of Colorado School of Medicine; Shodair Children's Hospital

Mary Anne Guggenheim (born Mary Anne Schoessler in 1935) is a professor of pediatric neurology who was elected to the Montana House of Representatives in 1998 for one term. She was the first female president of the Child Neurology Society. and received the Roger and Mary Brumback Lifetime Achievement Award from that society in 2009. In 1998, Guggenheim was elected as a Democrat to Montana's House of Representatives. In 2010, Guggenheim and her partner Jan Donaldson were lead plaintiffs in a suit with the American Civil Liberties Union to sue Montana for failing to provide legal protections for same-sex families in violation of the Montana Constitution's guarantees of equal protection (Donaldson and Guggenheim vs Montana).

== Education ==
Guggenheim studied chemistry at Willamette University, then went to the University of Wisconsin for a year of graduate education in biochemistry. She then obtained her MD at Harvard Medical School.

She did her residency in pediatrics at Case Western Reserve University. She was inspired by Robert M. Eiben at Cleveland Metropolitan Hospital, who studied infectious disease for years before training to become a pediatric neurologist, and who specialized in poliomyelitis, to complete a 2-year fellowship in neurovirology at the National Cancer Institute of the National Institutes of Health. With Alan Rabson, she published three seminal papers on interferons.

She did another 2-year residency in pediatric neurology, with Phillip Dodge at St. Louis Children's Hospital. A third year was spent at the University of Colorado School of Medicine, focusing on neuropathology.

== Work in pediatric neurology ==
Guggenheim remained at the University of Colorado, where she became Vice Chair of the Pediatric Department and Program Director of the pediatrics residency. She eventually rose to the rank of Distinguished Clinical Professor.

In 1975, Guggenheim started three child neurology outreach clinics in Montana, Idaho and Wyoming. She traveled back and forth between her outreach clinics and the University of Colorado, until 1983, when she moved to Montana to build a child neurology clinic at Shodair Children's Hospital.

In 1979, Guggenheim organized a meeting of the Child Neurology Society in Keystone, Colorado. That year she was elected a councillor of the executive committee of the Child Neurology Society. Two years later she was elected president – the 10th president, and the first female president of the society.

== The Montana legislature ==
In 1998, Guggenheim was elected as a Democrat to Montana's House of Representatives, unseating long-time Republican representative Ed Grady. She served only one term.

== Donaldson and Guggenheim v. Montana ==
In a pediatric neurology clinic at the University of Colorado, Guggenheim met a nurse, Jan Donaldson, who would become her life partner, and in 2014, her wife. They moved to Montana together in 1983, with their four children.

Until 1997, "homosexual behavior" was considered a felony in Montana, punishable with a 10-year jail term and a $50,000 fine. In 2004, Initiative 96 was passed in Montana, defining marriage as "between one man and one woman."

In 2010, Donaldson and Guggenheim signed on as lead plaintiffs in a suit with the American Civil Liberties Union and five other same-sex couples to sue the state of Montana for failing to provide legal protections for their families in violation of the Montana Constitution's guarantees of equal protection (Donaldson and Guggenheim vs Montana).

== Personal life ==
Mary Anne Schoessler married nephrologist Stephen Joel Guggenheim in 1964. Per official records, they separated in 1983 and divorced in 1985.

Guggenheim moved to Montana with Jan Donaldson in 1983. The two women married legally in California in 2014 – a week before a federal court ruled that Montana's ban on same-sex marriages was unconstitutional. They retired from medicine and started a business, making hand-made wooden furniture, in 1995. Guggenheim and Donaldson each had two children from previous marriages, raised together. Donaldson died March 22, 2019.

== Boards and societies ==
- President of the Child Neurology Society (1981–1982)
- board of directors of Blue-Cross/Blue Shield of Montana *Consultant for the important innovation of the Vaccine Injury Compensation Program of the DHHS
- Professional Advisor to the Epilepsy Foundation (board of directors 1993–98)
- Advisory Committee of Children's Special Services of Montana (Chair 1996– 2004)
- Advisory Committee, Montana Child and Family Support Services; Chair of the Montana Committee for review of the Newborn Screening Program
- Member of the Montana Board of Medical Examiners
