= Dan Johnston (politician) =

American lawyer and politician (1938–2016)

Polk County Attorney
- In office 1977–1985

Member of the Iowa House of Representatives from the 37th district
- In office January 9, 1967 – January 12, 1969

Personal details
- Born: April 6, 1938 Montezuma, Iowa, U.S.
- Died: October 21, 2016 (aged 78) Des Moines, Iowa, U.S.
- Party: Iowa Democratic Party
- Spouse: Norman Jesse
- Education: Drake University
- Occupation: Lawyer, politician

Dan L. Johnston (April 6, 1938 – October 21, 2016) was an American lawyer and politician. He was from Des Moines, Iowa. A member of the Iowa Democratic Party, he served in the Iowa House of Representatives and as the Polk County attorney.

== Early life ==
Born in Montezuma, Iowa, Johnston attended the public schools in Marshalltown and Toledo before earning a bachelor's degree from Westmar College, attending Iowa State University and earning a law degree from Drake University Law School.

== Career ==
He served as an assistant Iowa attorney general before being elected to the Iowa House in 1966. Rather than seek re-election in 1968, he ran for Iowa Attorney General, winning the Democratic nomination before losing the general election to Republican Richard C. Turner. In 1975, he began working for the National Center for State Courts.

He was elected Polk County attorney in 1976, serving from 1977 to 1985, when he decided to resign and move to New York City. In New York, he served as director of Gay Men's Health Crisis from 1987 to 1990 and on the New York police civilian complaint review board from 1986 to 1990. He then lived in Washington, D.C., and worked as general counsel for the criminal justice subcommittee of the U.S. House Judiciary Committee.

=== Tinker v. Des Moines ===
Johnston's highest profile case as a lawyer was Tinker v. Des Moines, a case about the free speech rights of two Des Moines public school students who wore black armbands to protest the Vietnam War and were subsequently suspended by school administrators. Johnston argued and won the case in front of the U.S. Supreme Court in 1969, when he was just over a year out of law school.

== Electoral history ==
Iowa Attorney General, 1968 primary election
Party	Candidate	Votes	%
Democratic	Dan Johnston	45,397	44.1
Democratic	Hayes	30,749	29.9
Democratic	Walton	26,783	26.0
Total votes		111,929	100

Iowa Attorney General, 1968 general election
Party	Candidate	Votes	%
Republican	Richard C. Turner	596,302	55.2
Democratic	Dan Johnston	482,876	44.7
Prohibition	George A. Murray	2,038	0.2
Total votes		1,081,216	100
Republican hold			

== Personal life ==
Johnston was gay; his partner for more than 35 years was Norman Jesse, who also served in the Iowa House. Neither Johnston nor Jesse was publicly out as gay during their careers in politics. They maintained separate residences across the street from each other and rarely spent the night together in the same bed.

Johnston's sexual orientation became an issue when he ran for re-election as Polk County attorney in 1980. Persistent rumors of his homosexuality culminated in a caller questioning Johnston on a local radio talk show. Johnston refused to answer, saying "that nobody had any business asking the question".

Johnston died of cancer on October 21, 2016, in a hospice in Des Moines, Iowa.
