= McKim Mitchell =

American politician

Member of the New Hampshire House of Representatives from the Cheshire 26th district
- In office 1998–2004
- Governor: Jeanne Shaheen; Craig Benson

Personal details
- Born: McKim William Mitchell; March 31, 1954 (age 72)
- Party: Democratic
- Spouse: Jon Glende

McKim William Mitchell (born March 31, 1954) is a former American politician, who served in the New Hampshire House of Representatives from 1998 to 2004. A member of the Democratic Party, he represented Cheshire County, and served on the House Judiciary and Finance committees.

Openly gay, he served as a cochair of the New Hampshire chapter of the Stonewall Democrats. When the General Court debated legislation in 2004 to ban same-sex marriage in New Hampshire, Mitchell spoke against the legislation by telling about his rejection by his parents and brother, who had not invited him to spend a family holiday with them in over 25 years despite living on the same road.

In the 2004 election, Mitchell ran for a seat in the New Hampshire State Senate, against incumbent Thomas R. Eaton in Senate District 10. He narrowly lost that election, and subsequently opened a sawmill business in Chesterfield.
