= Marlene DeChane =

American politician

Marlene DeChane (July 8, 1956, Methuen, Massachusetts – September 20, 2020) was a Democratic member of the New Hampshire House of Representatives representing Strafford County District 6. First elected in 1994, she was re-elected in 1996, 1998, 2000, and 2006.

DeChane, who was openly gay, "sponsored the landmark Civil Rights Law of 1997 that banned discrimination based on sexual orientation."

== Education ==
- BS, Plymouth State University, 1978
- AS, Mount Ida College, 1976
