= Barbara Wood (politician) =

American politician

Member of the Maine House of Representatives from the 38th district
- In office December 2, 2020 – December 7, 2022
- Preceded by: Matt Moonen
- Succeeded by: Benjamin Hymes

Barbara Wood is an American politician, who was elected to the Maine House of Representatives in 2020. She represented the 38th House District as a member of the Maine Democratic Party.

Prior to her election to the legislature Wood served on Portland, Maine City Council. Her election to that body in 1988 made her the state's first out LGBTQ officeholder.
