= Maureen AuCoin =

American politician

Member-elect of the Maine House of Representatives from the 55th district
- Assuming office December 2026
- Succeeding: Daniel Shagoury

Personal details
- Party: Democratic

Maureen AuCoin, also known as Mo AuCoin, is an American politician. A member of the Democratic Party, she is the member-elect for the 55th district of the Maine House of Representatives.
