= Brady Bremer =

American politician

Member-elect of the Montana House of Representatives from the 64th district
- Assuming office January 2027
- Succeeding: Kelly Kortum

Personal details
- Party: Democratic

Brady Bremer is an American politician. A member of the Democratic Party, he is the member-elect for the 64th district of the Montana House of Representatives.
