= Janet Lucas =

American politician

Member of New Hampshire House of Representatives for Grafton 7
- Incumbent
- Assumed office December 4, 2024
- Preceded by: Tommy Hoyt

Personal details
- Party: Democratic
- Website: www.electjanetlucas.com

Janet Marie Lucas is an American politician. She is a member of the New Hampshire House of Representatives.

== Personal life ==
Lucas and her wife Sherrill and have two children and three grandchildren.
