= Wayne Angevine =

American politician (born 1935)

Member of the Washington State Senate for the 32nd district
- In office 1959–1963

Member of the Washington House of Representatives for the 31st district
- In office 1965–1967

Personal details
- Born: 1935 (age 90–91) Seattle, Washington, U.S.
- Party: Democratic
- Spouse: Fran
- Children: 5
- Education: Seattle University (BA)

Wayne George Angevine (born 1935) is an American former politician in the state of Washington from Seattle. He served in the Washington House of Representatives and Washington State Senate. He was one of the youngest people to sit in the State Senate, having been elected at the age of 23.

Angevine earned a Bachelor of Arts degree from Seattle University, and sold life insurance. He had two children with his wife, Fran who had three children from a previous marriage.

By 1978, Angevine was Seattle's assistant city clerk, and had come out as gay. Later that year, he unsuccessfully ran for the Seattle City Council.
