= Norman Jesse =

American politician (1937–2000)

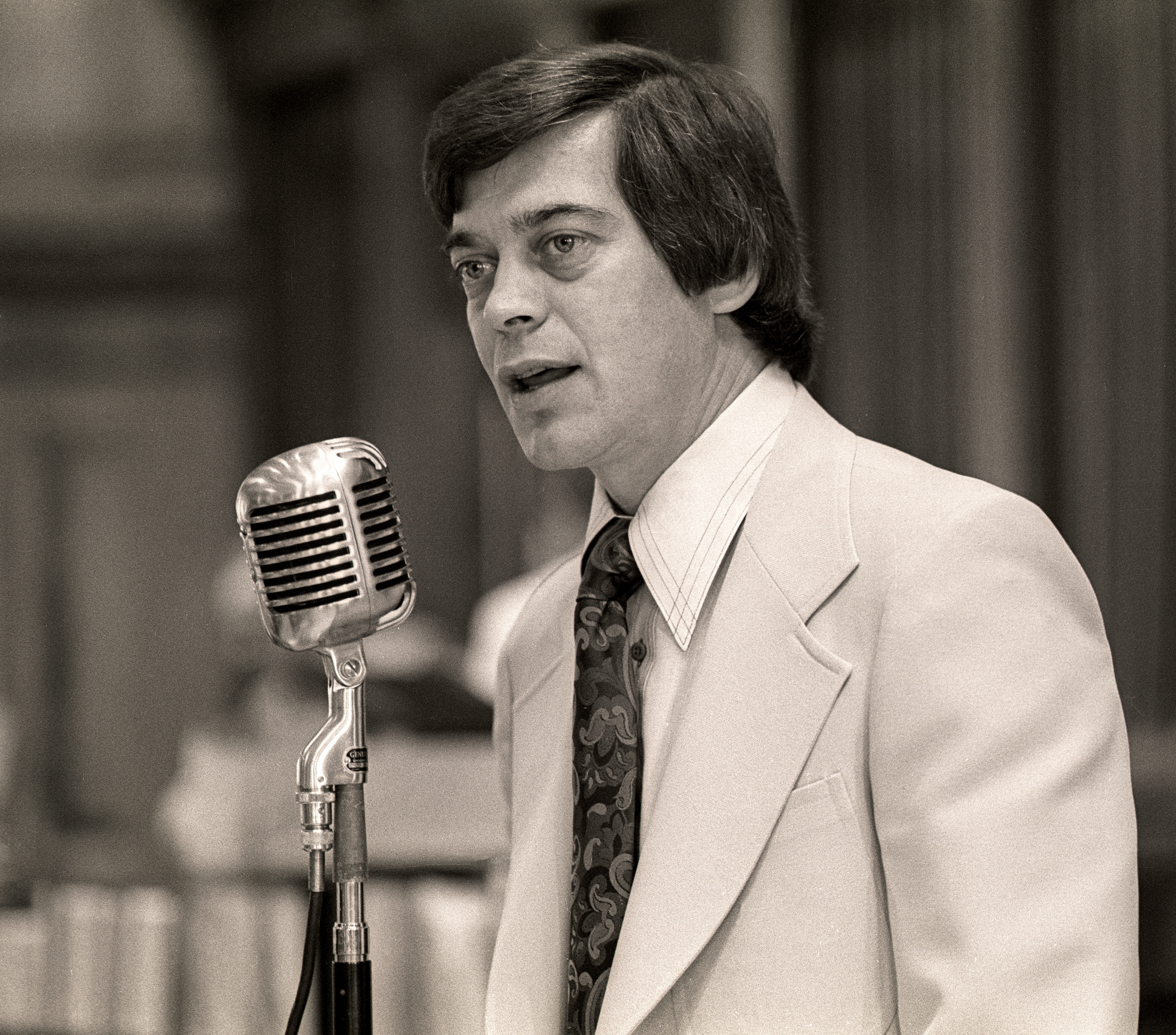
- Norman Jesse on the floor of the Iowa House of Representatives

Member of the Iowa House of Representatives from the 62nd district 37th (1969–71), 58th (1971–73)
- In office January 13, 1969 – January 11, 1981
- Preceded by: Philip B. Hill
- Succeeded by: Jo Ann Trucano

Personal details
- Born: November 9, 1937 Des Moines, Iowa
- Died: May 28, 2000 (aged 62)
- Party: Iowa Democratic Party
- Spouse: Dan Johnston
- Education: Iowa State University; Drake University (LLB)
- Occupation: Lawyer, politician

Norman G. Jesse (November 9, 1937 – May 28, 2000) was an American lawyer and politician from Des Moines, Iowa. A member of the Iowa Democratic Party, he served in the Iowa House of Representatives from 1969 to 1981. Jesse was gay; his partner for more than 35 years was Dan Johnston, who also served in the Iowa House. Neither Johnston nor Jesse was publicly out as gay during their careers in politics. They maintained separate residences across the street from each other and rarely spent the night together in the same bed.

Jesse attended Harriet B. Stowe Elementary School, Woodrow Wilson Junior High School and Des Moines Technical High School, graduating in January 1956. He received a B.S. degree from Iowa State University in 1961, majoring in industrial administration. He then went to Drake University Law School, where he earned an L.L.B. in 1964.
