= Andrew Cray =

American LGBTQ rights activist (1986–2014)

- Born: June 11, 1986; Chippewa Falls, Wisconsin, U.S.
- Died: August 28, 2014 (aged 28); Baltimore, Maryland, U.S.
- Education: Northwestern University (BA); University of Michigan (JD)
- Political party: Democratic
- Spouse: Sarah McBride (m. 2014)
- Relatives: Seymour Cray (grandfather)

Andrew S. Cray (June 11, 1986 – August 28, 2014) was an American LGBTQ rights activist and political figure. Cray played a central role in securing new nationwide LGBTQ nondiscrimination protections as part of the Affordable Care Act, partnering with the White House and the Department of Health and Human Services to create the Out2Enroll initiative to connect LGBTQ people with health insurance coverage options, as well as assisting with the passage of the HOPE Act to make organ donation and transplantation more accessible to people with HIV, and drafting new provisions addressing the needs of LGBTQ youth for the McKinney–Vento Homeless Assistance Act.

== Early life and education ==
Andrew Cray was born in Chippewa Falls, Wisconsin, the son of Steven and Ardis Cray. He was the grandson of Seymour Cray, the founder of Cray Research. Cray was valedictorian of the Chippewa Falls High School Class of 2004. In addition to achieving high marks academically, he was a multi-instrument musician who played the drums, clarinet, keyboard and trombone. Cray was student director of the school concert band and a recipient of the John Philip Sousa Award.

After graduating from high school, he received his bachelor's degree from Northwestern University and his Juris Doctor degree from the University of Michigan Law School. During his time at Northwestern, Cray was the activism chair for Rainbow Alliance.

== Career ==
After coming out as a transgender man during college, Cray began his career as a legal fellow and policy analyst with the National Coalition for LGBT Health, where he served as the lead researcher and author of the coalition's comprehensive report on LGBTQ veterans’ health. Cray served as a Law Fellow at the National LGBTQ Task Force in 2009, where he was tasked with writing recommendations for inclusion in the health reform legislation being debated in the United States Congress. Cray then became a health law and policy fellow at the National Center for Transgender Equality, where he advocated for access to affordable, high-quality health care for transgender people. Andrew was a founding member of Trans Legal Advocates of Washington, which trains attorneys on transgender legal issues and operates pro bono legal clinics for transgender clients.

Beginning in 2012, Cray served as a Policy Analyst for the Center for American Progress's LGBTQ Research and Communications Project. Cray's research focused on LGBTQ inclusion and engagement in state implementation of the Affordable Care Act, health insurance policies that improve coverage for LGBTQ families, LGBTQ-inclusive data collection, and LGBTQ youth. Cray spearheaded efforts to obtain transgender-inclusive health insurance policies in several U.S. states and the District of Columbia. Among his federal policy work, Cray played a critical role as a founder of Out2Enroll, a nationwide initiative that connects LGBTQ people and their families with health insurance coverage options.

Cray participated in an event at the White House to celebrate the enrollment of more than 8 million people into health insurance following the implementation of the Affordable Care Act. Cray received a standing ovation from attendees. Paulette Aniskoff, director of the White House Office of Public Engagement, said Cray's contributions to the Affordable Care Act were integral to the successful implementation of the law.

== Personal life and death ==
On August 24, 2014, after receiving a terminal cancer diagnosis, Cray married LGBTQ rights activist Sarah McBride, who is also transgender. Episcopal bishop Gene Robinson presided at their ceremony. Four days after their wedding, Cray died from oral cancer.

== Legacy ==
In October 2014, President Barack Obama posthumously honored Cray as a "Champion of Change" for his contributions to LGBTQ health. In 2014, the National Center for Transgender Equality created a Law Fellowship and Award in Honor of Cray. In 2016, a scholarship fund in Cray's name (The Andrew Cray Memorial Scholarship, now the Andrew Cray High Education Fund) was created to support post-secondary opportunities for LGBTQ youth in Wisconsin.
