= Senator Kuykendall =

Senator Kuykendall may refer to:

- Andrew J. Kuykendall (1815–1891), Illinois State Senate
- Elgin V. Kuykendall (1870–1958), Washington State Senate
