= Oakland High School (Oregon) =

Public school in Oakland, Oregon

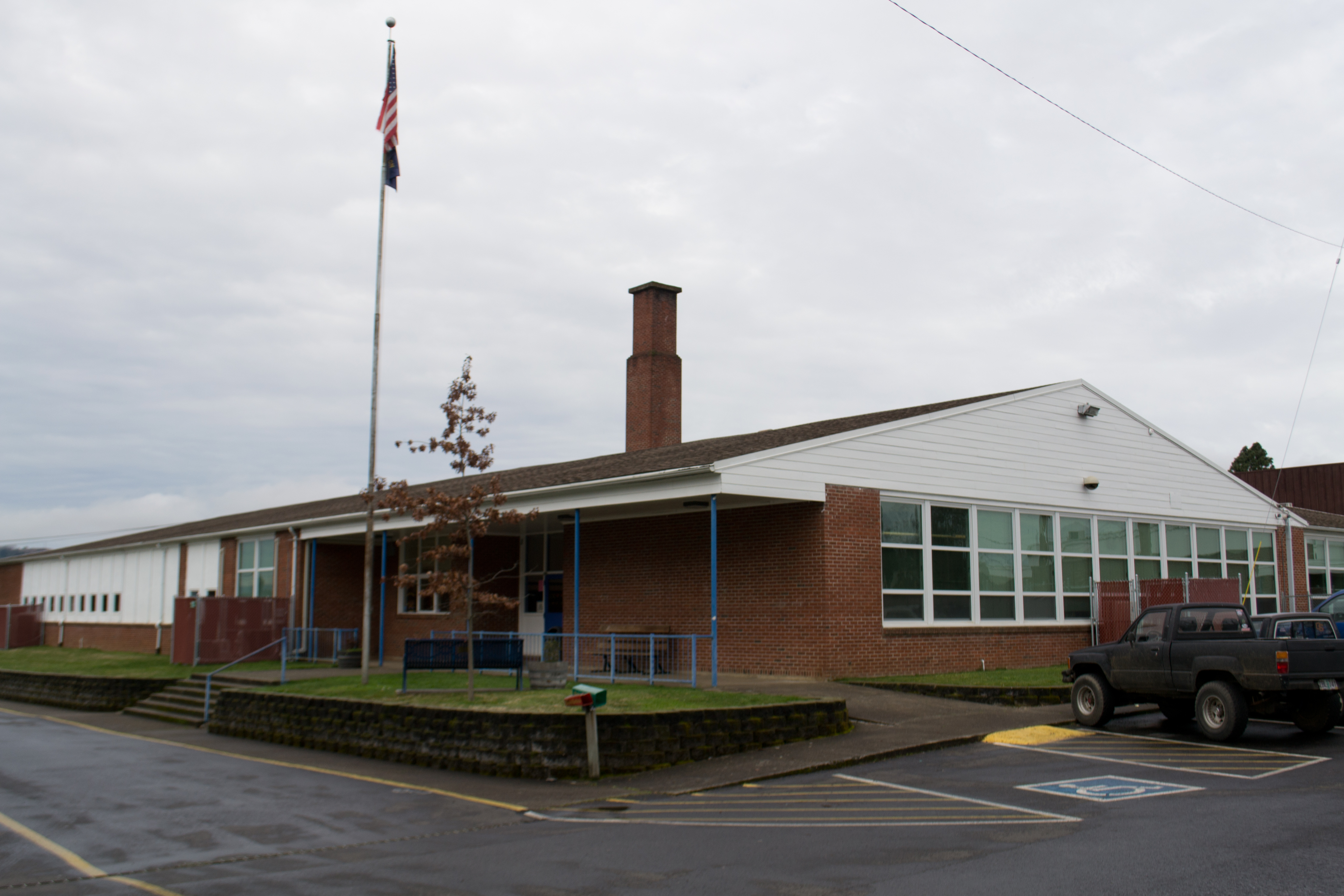

Location
- 521 NE Spruce Street; Oakland, (Douglas County), Oregon 97462; United States; 43.4280°N 123.2988°W

Information
- Type: Public
- School district: Oakland School District
- Principal: Rachel Swearingen
- Teaching staff: 13.00 (FTE)
- Grades: 9-12
- Enrollment: 214 (2023–2024)
- Student to teacher ratio: 16.46
- Colors: Blue and gold
- Athletics conference: OSAA Mountain View Conference 2A-2
- Mascot: Oaker
- Team name: Oakland Oakers
- Newspaper: The Oaker Chronicle
- Yearbook: The Acorn
- Website: www.oakland.k12.or.us/o/ohs

Oakland High School (OHS) is a public high school that belongs to the Oakland School District. It is the only high school in the city of Oakland, Oregon, United States.

== Academics ==
In 2008, 80% of the school's seniors received a high school diploma. Of 40 students, 32 graduated, three dropped out, two received a modified diploma, and three were still in high school the following year.

== Athletics and extracurriculars ==
Oakland's boys' basketball team won state championships in 2000, 2006, and 2013. The 2013 team consisted of seniors Colton Reber, Logan O'Hara, Connor Dolan, Austin Collins, and Jordan Bailey; juniors Toby Blum, Michael Yard, Zack VanDeHey, Jeb Harper, Joey Dixon-Magnus, Austin Nix, and Austin Baimbridge; and sophomores Roy Benzel and Hayden Snow.

Oakland High School's highschool band won first-place for the 1A-2A state band contests in both 2018 and 2022.

OHS' football team won the 2022-2023 state championship, having previously won it in 2011.

OHS football team won 1964-65 State championship. Coached by Chuck Halstead

OHS track team won 1964-65 State championship in Bend OR. Team consisted of Jon Lamereaux, Randy Manley, Steve Ray, Greg Vasche, Larry Vara and Ron Sanderson, coached by Bill Spelgatti.

== Notable alumni ==
- Brandon Ash - NASCAR driver
- Tim Freeman - politician
- Tammy Smith - US Army General
