= Bree Fram =

American engineer and military officer

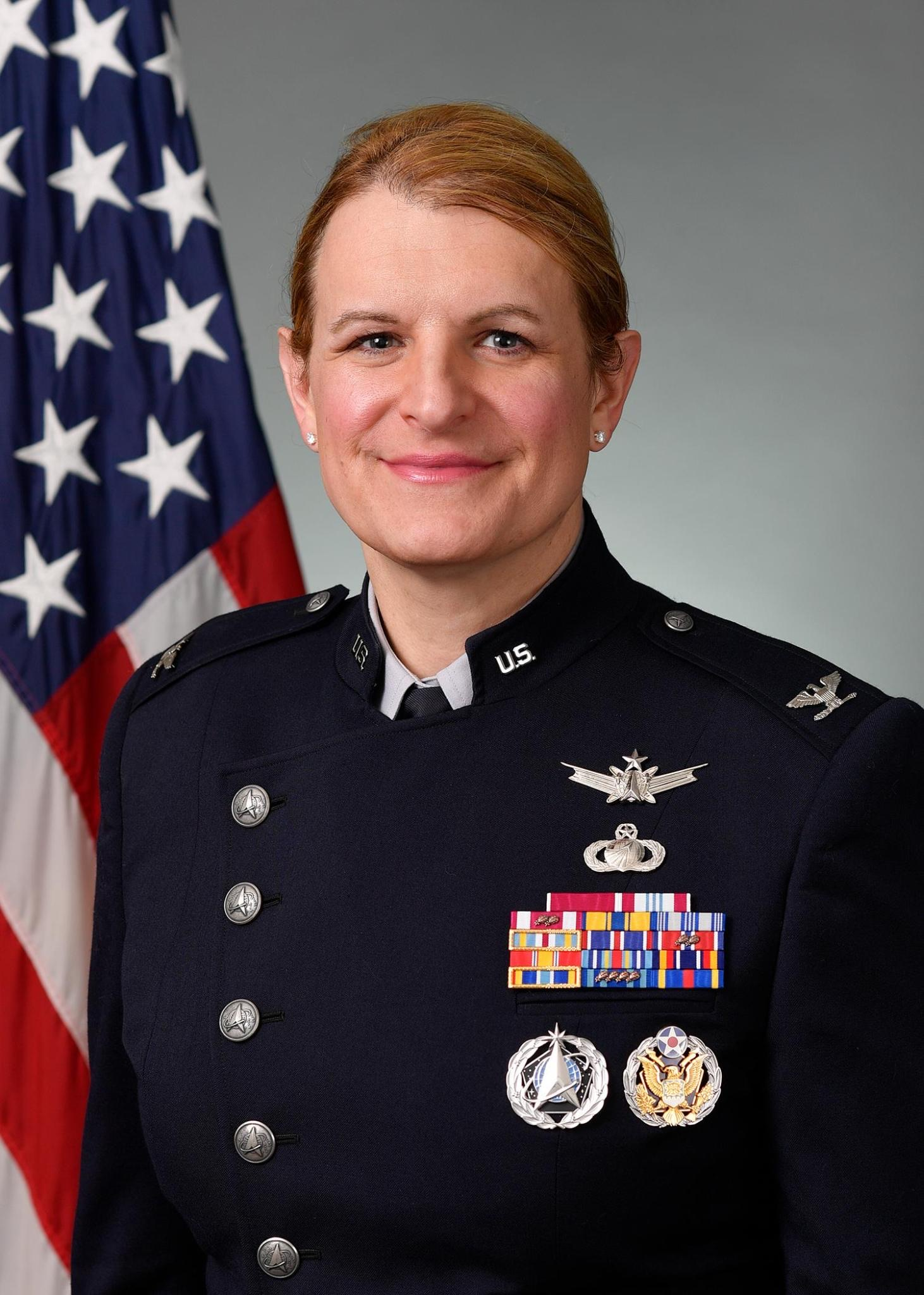
- Fram in 2025

Personal details
- Born: 1979 (age 46–47) Minnesota, U.S.
- Party: Democratic
- Children: 2
- Education: University of Minnesota (BS); Air University (MS); Naval War College (MA)
- Website: Official website; Campaign website

Military service
- Branch/service: United States Air Force (2003–2023); United States Space Force (2023–2026)
- Years of service: 2003–2026
- Rank: Colonel
- Battles/wars: Iraq War • Operation Iraqi Freedom

Bree Fram (born 1979) is an American astronautical engineer, transgender rights activist, and retired military officer. She served in the United States Air Force during the Iraq War and was deployed to Iraq and Qatar as part of the 2003 invasion of Iraq. Fram later served as an officer in the United States Space Force and, as the first transgender person to be promoted to the rank of colonel, she was the highest-ranking transgender officer in the United States Armed Forces. She came out as a transgender woman in 2016, while serving in a command position, and served through the re-imposition of the transgender military ban from 2019 to 2021. Fram co-led the United States Department of the Air Force's LGBTQ+ Initiatives Team and, from 2021 to 2023, served as president of the military transgender advocacy nonprofit organization SPARTA Pride. She was forced to retire from the military in 2026, following President Donald Trump's Executive Order 14183 that barred transgender people from serving in the armed forces. In 2026, Fram ran in the 2026 U.S. House election for Virginia's 11th congressional district.

== Background and education ==
Fram's maternal great-grandfather, Ludwig Hirsekorn, served in the Imperial German Army during World War I and was awarded the Iron Cross 1st class. During the Third Reich, Ludwig was persecuted by the Nazis for being Jewish and fled from Germany to France and then to the United States. His son, Fram's maternal grandfather Fred S. Hirsekorn, was the youngest first sergeant in the European Theatre during World War II, earning two bronze stars and refusing a battlefield commission for valor in order to stay with his soldiers. Fram's paternal grandfather, Paul Fram, was the son of Ukrainian and Latvian Jewish refugees and served as a United States Army Signal Corps officer during World War II. She also descends from a member of the House of Burgesses, who served in the Virginia General Assembly in the 1650s, and from patriots of the American Revolutionary War.

Fram is from Mendota Heights, Minnesota and graduated from the University of Minnesota with a bachelor's degree in aerospace engineering in 2001. She earned a Master of Science degree in astronautical engineering from the Air Force Institute of Technology of Air University in 2007 and a Master of Arts degree in national security and strategic studies from the Naval War College in 2021.

== Career ==
=== Military ===
Fram worked as an astronautical engineer and lieutenant colonel in the United States Air Force until 2023. She served as an active duty officer in the United States Space Force at the Pentagon, becoming a colonel in January 2024. Fram was one of the highest-ranking out transgender officers in the United States military and the highest ranking transgender member of the United States Department of Defense. Fram is the first transgender woman to be promoted to the rank of colonel.

She served in a research and development command position for United States Air Force security cooperation activity in Iraq and was deployed to Iraq and Qatar as part of Operation Iraqi Freedom. She also served in the Air Force Directorate of Strategic Plans as a legislative fellow at the United States Capitol on the staff of Congresswoman Madeleine Bordallo. She was a co-leader of the United States Department of the Air Force's LGBTQ+ Initiatives Team.

In March 2025, Fram spoke out against President Donald Trump's executive order barring transgender people from serving and enlisting in the military. On June 6, 2025, she announced she had been placed on administrative leave, pending separation, under the Defense Department's new ban on transgender service members. She later announced that, per the president's executive order, she was being forced to retire from the military. Fram's retirement was commemorated, along with Lieutenant Colonel Erin Krizek, Commander Blake Dremann, Sergeant First Class Cathrine Schmid, and Chief Petty Officer Jaida McGuire, at a ceremony hosted by the Human Rights Campaign Foundation on January 8, 2026. The retirement ceremony was presided over by retired U.S. Army General Stanley A. McChrystal and featured remarks from Congressman Mark Takano, Congresswoman Sarah McBride, retired Major General Tammy Smith, and Shawn Skelly, the former Assistant Secretary of Defense for Readiness and Force Management.

=== LGBTQ advocacy ===
Fram served as president and board chair of SPARTA Pride, an advocacy nonprofit organization for transgender military personnel, from April 2021 to April 2023. She had previously served for eight years in other leadership roles within the organization. She was awarded the LGBTQ+ Annual Recognition Award for Engineering by Out to Innovate in 2022. In October 2024, Fram was included in Out's Out 100 list recognizing LGBTQ+ people for their achievements.

=== Writing ===
Fram worked as an editor of the 2021 book With Honor and Integrity: Transgender Troops in Their Own Words and its 2025 sequel, With Valor and Visibility: The Next Chapter of Transgender Service in 2025. In 2024, she co-authored the book Forging Queer Leaders: How the LGBTQIA+ Community Creates Impact from Adversity.

=== Politics ===
On January 20, 2026, Fram announced her candidacy for Congress, filing in Virginia's 11th congressional district. She ran as a Democrat and her campaign was managed by Sabrina Bruce. Due to expected redrawing of Virginia's congressional districts, Fram announced that she would run for whichever district her residence is placed in for the 2026 U.S. House election. She was placed in the 11th congressional district, and ran against incumbent Congressman James Walkinshaw in the Democratic primary. During her campaign, she spoke out against the killings of Renée Good and Alex Pretti by Immigrations and Customs Enforcement (ICE) officers and participated in an anti-ICE protest in Reston, Virginia. Her campaign is running on improvements to federal government services, strengthening national security, foreign diplomacy reform, LGBTQ+ rights, Veterans support, less government interference in local schools, and economic improvements. She has been endorsed by the nonprofit organization Advocates for Trans Equality, by former Assistant Secretary for Health Rachel Levine, and by Frank Kendall, the former United States Secretary of the Air Force during the Biden Administration. On May 13, 2026, she announced that she was ending her campaign.

== Personal life ==
Fram lives in Northern Virginia. She and her wife have two children. She was diagnosed with a rare form of abdominal cancer and underwent surgery and chemotherapy to treat it. Fram came out as a transgender woman in 2016. She transitioned while in a command position, serving through the re-imposition of the transgender military ban from 2019 to 2021.
