= Sarah McBride =

American politician and activist (born 1990)

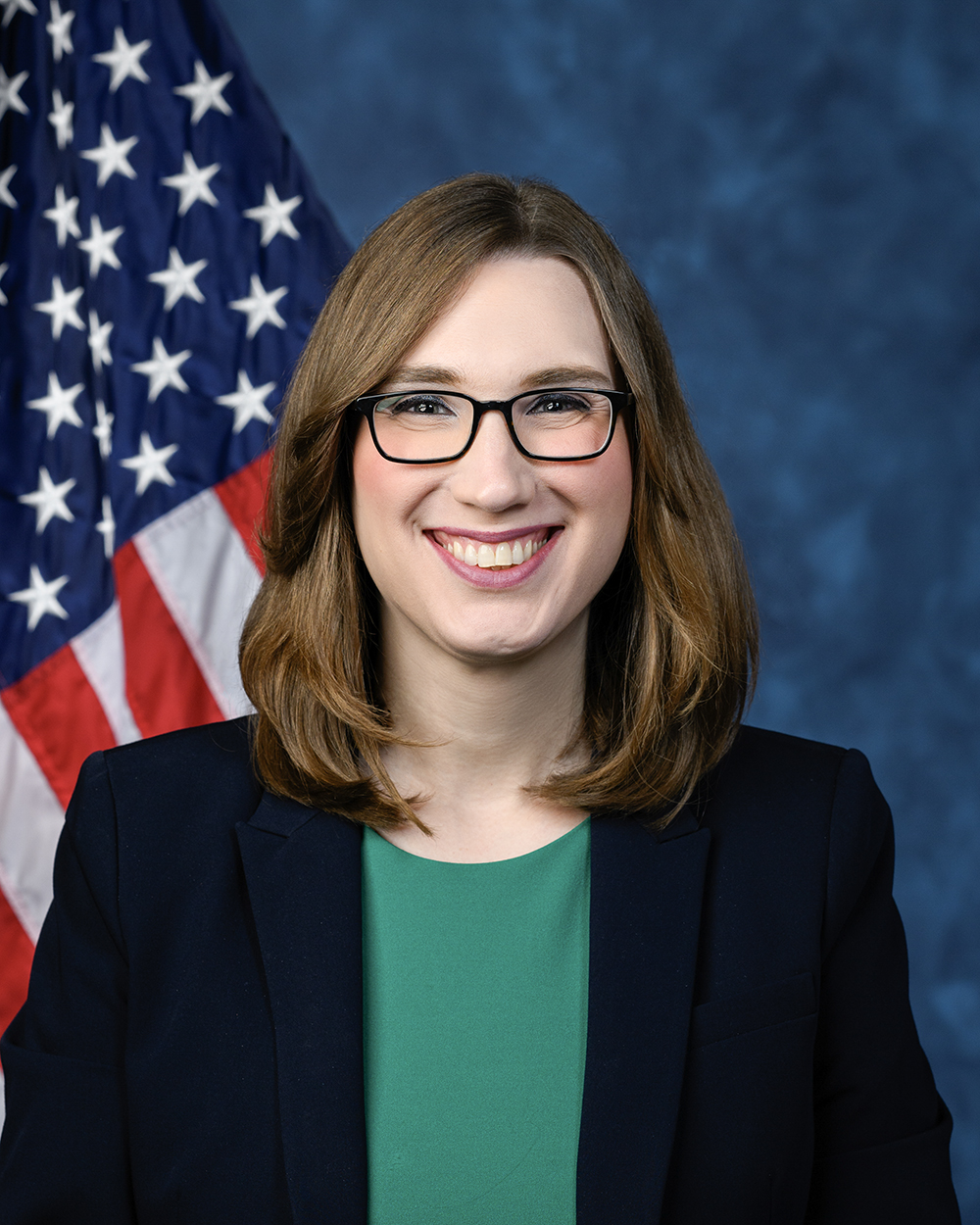
- Official portrait, 2024

Member of the U.S. House of Representatives from Delaware's at-large district
- Incumbent
- Assumed office January 3, 2025
- Preceded by: Lisa Blunt Rochester

Member of the Delaware Senate from the 1st district
- In office November 4, 2020 – January 2, 2025
- Preceded by: Harris McDowell III
- Succeeded by: Dan Cruce

Personal details
- Born: August 9, 1990 (age 36) Wilmington, Delaware, U.S.
- Party: Democratic
- Spouse: Andrew Cray (m. 2014; died 2014)
- Education: American University (BA)
- Website: House website Campaign website
- McBride's voice McBride honoring Delaware State Police Corporal Matthew "Ty" Snook; Recorded January 7, 2026

Sarah Elizabeth McBride (born August 9, 1990) is an American politician, author, and LGBTQ rights activist serving as the U.S. representative for Delaware's at-large congressional district since 2025. A member of the Democratic Party, she served in the Delaware Senate from 2021 to 2025, representing the 1st district. Prior, she was the national press secretary of the Human Rights Campaign from 2016 to 2021. McBride is the nation's highest ranking openly transgender elected official and the first openly transgender member of the United States Congress. Her 2024 congressional campaign is the subject of the 2025 documentary State of Firsts.

In 2020, McBride became the first openly transgender person elected as a state senator in the United States. Prior to her election, McBride lobbied for the successful passage of legislation in Delaware banning discrimination on the basis of gender identity in employment, housing, insurance, and public accommodations. In July 2016, she was a speaker at the Democratic National Convention, becoming the first openly transgender person to address a major party convention in American history. In 2018, McBride published her memoir Tomorrow Will Be Different: Love, Loss, and the Fight for Trans Equality, with a foreword by then-former vice president and later U.S. president Joe Biden. McBride has been credited with shaping Biden's personal views and political evolution on transgender issues.

McBride was first elected to the U.S. House of Representatives in 2024, and was reelected in 2026.

== Early life ==
Sarah McBride was born in Wilmington, Delaware, to David and Sally McBride on August 9, 1990. Her father was a lawyer for Young Conaway Stargatt & Taylor; her mother was a high school guidance counselor and a founder of the Cab Calloway School of the Arts in Wilmington. McBride has two older brothers.

The family attended Westminster Presbyterian Church in Wilmington, a congregation of the PCUSA. McBride was a youth elder, her father was a ruling elder, and her mother was a deacon. The church's longtime pastor was Rev. Gregory Knox Jones. McBride participated in church musicals in her youth, and her favorite Presbyterian hymn had been Here I Am, Lord.

McBride had initial interest in becoming an architect as a child; she developed interest in history, then politics, while reading about the architecture of the United States Capitol, and of the White House. She read about U.S. presidents Abraham Lincoln and Franklin D. Roosevelt (FDR), and built toy models of the White House. McBride's father, David, said an early sign of her political interest was at age 11; he said, "I come home one day from work ... she has an American flag draped over the window, she has the podium, she's created a cardboard presidential seal and she's reciting FDR's 1932 inaugural address." McBride's first political volunteering was for the 2004 state insurance commissioner campaign of Matt Denn, who previously worked at the same law firm as her father.

For elementary school, McBride attended Elementary Workshop, a now-defunct private institution of Montessori education. She attended Cab Calloway, a public magnet school, for middle and high school. There, she took instruction about various performing arts and media subjects, such as film studies. She graduated from Cab Calloway in 2009.

She then attended American University in Washington, D.C. She was elected student body president there in 2011, having earlier worked on "arts advocacy, the purchase of conflict-free minerals on campus and academic regulations" as a member of the undergraduate senate from 2010. During this time, she had already begun political advocacy, including as a co-founder of Delaware's Young Democrats Movement and on the election campaigns for local Democrats, including Beau Biden, Matthew Denn, and Jack Markell. At the end of her term as president of the student government, she penned a letter in the school's newspaper in which she announced her transition. In 2013, McBride graduated from American University's School of Public Affairs (SPA) with a bachelor's degree in government.

In a 2011 interview, she cited Markell as a particular role model.

== Social and political activism ==
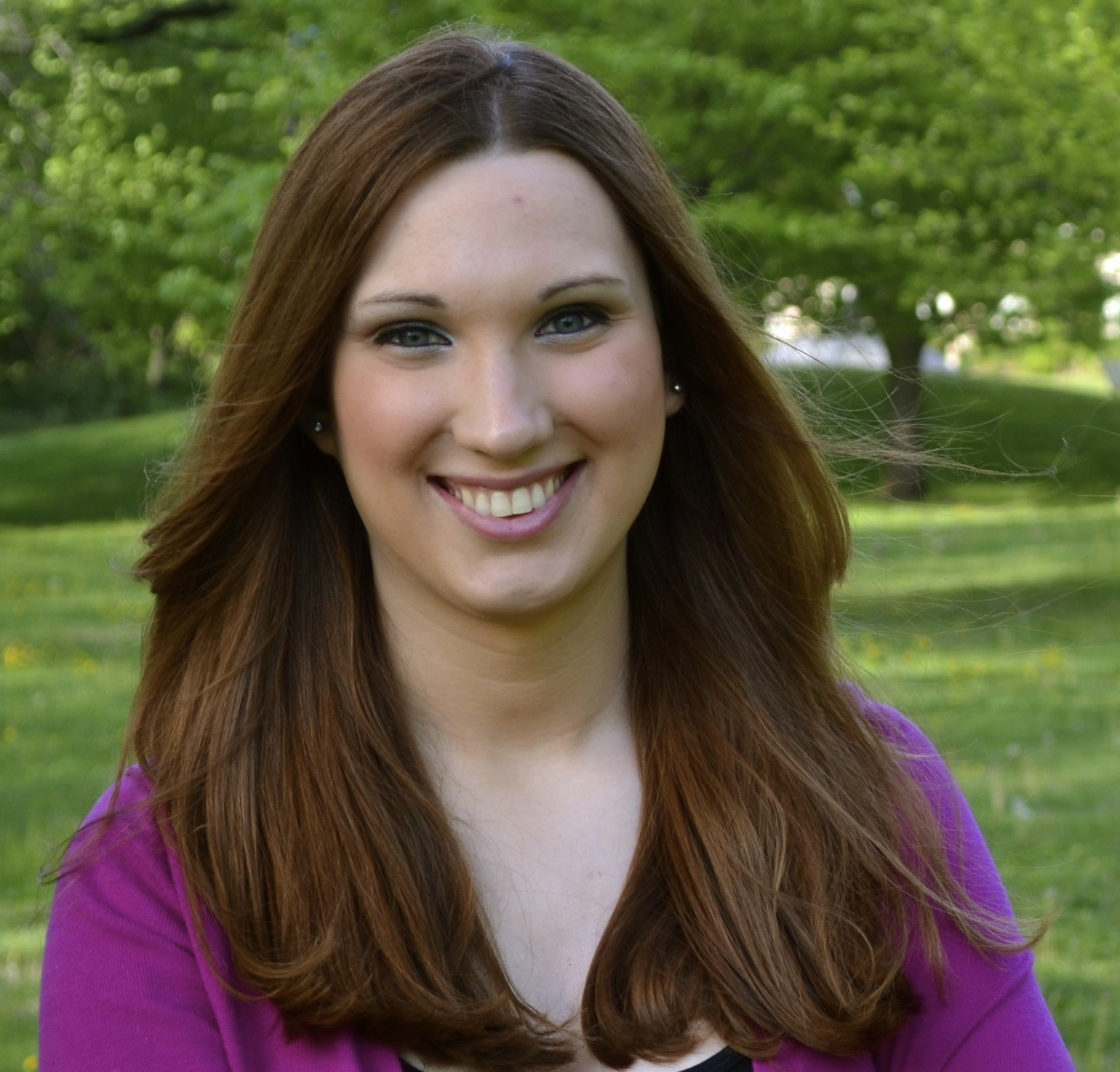
McBride in 2016

McBride has said that she has been interested in politics since she was a child. She worked as a staffer on several campaigns in Delaware, including that of Governor Jack Markell in 2008 and of Delaware attorney general Beau Biden in 2010. In 2011, McBride was elected student body president at American University. During her last week as student body president in 2012, McBride gained international attention when she came out as a transgender woman in her college's student newspaper, The Eagle.

McBride's coming out was featured on NPR, Huffington Post, and by Lady Gaga's Born This Way Foundation. After coming out, McBride received a call from Attorney General of Delaware Beau Biden, saying, "Sarah, I just wanted you to know, I'm so proud of you. I love you, and you're still a part of the Biden family." Vice President Joe Biden expressed similar sentiments, sharing that he was proud of her and happy for her.

In 2012, McBride interned at the White House, becoming the first openly transgender woman to work there in any capacity. McBride worked in the White House Office of Public Engagement and Intergovernmental Affairs, where she worked on LGBTQ issues. In a speech in May 2015, Second Lady Jill Biden told McBride's story. She added, "we believe young people should be valued for who they are, no matter what they look like, where they're from, the gender with which they identify, or who they love."

In January 2013, McBride joined the board of directors of Equality Delaware and quickly became the state's leading advocate for legal protections and hate crime legislation for transgender Delawareans. McBride and her family led the lobbying effort for legislation protecting Delawareans from discrimination on the basis of gender identity and expression in employment, housing, insurance, and public accommodations. In addition to serving as the primary spokesperson for the legislation, McBride built on her close relationship with Governor Jack Markell and Attorney General Beau Biden to gain the vocal support of both officials behind the bill. The legislation passed the state senate by a margin of one vote and the state house by a vote of 24–17. An amended bill was re-passed by the state senate and immediately signed into law by Markell in June 2013.

Upon signing the legislation, Markell stated:

I especially want to thank my friend Sarah McBride, an intelligent and talented Delawarean who happens to be transgender. She courageously stood before the General Assembly to describe her personal struggles with gender identity and communicate her desire to return home after her college graduation without fear. Her tireless advocacy for passage of this legislation has made a real difference for all transgender people in Delaware.

After passage of this legislation, McBride worked on the LGBT Progress team at the Center for American Progress. McBride has spoken at a number of colleges and LGBTQ events, including the Human Rights Campaign National Dinner, the Human Rights Campaign Los Angeles Dinner, the Victory Fund National Brunch, the University of Pennsylvania, and Gettysburg College. McBride was ranked the Most Valuable Progressive in Delaware by DelawareLiberal.net listed in the 2014 list of the Trans 100, and named one of the fifty upcoming millennials poised to make a difference in the coming years by Mic.

A 2015 article in the New Statesman on transgender representation in elective office predicted McBride would be the first transgender American elected to high public office. McBride was a panelist at the U.S. Department of Housing and Urban Development's "GLOBE Pride 2016" on youth and workplace bullying. McBride had been featured by media outlets such as The New York Times, The Huffington Post, The Washington Post, The Boston Globe, Al Jazeera, PBS NewsHour, Teen Vogue, The New Yorker, MSNBC, ThinkProgress, and NPR.

In April 2016, McBride delivered a TED Talk titled, "Gender assigned to us at birth should not dictate who we are." She also served on the steering committee of Trans United for Hillary, an effort to educate and mobilize transgender people and their allies in support of Hillary Clinton.

On July 28, 2016, McBride became the first openly transgender person to speak at a national party convention when she spoke at the 2016 Democratic National Convention. In her speech, which lasted less than four minutes, McBride paid tribute to her late husband Andrew Cray and his commitment to LGBTQ rights.

== Delaware Senate ==
On July 9, 2019, McBride formally announced her candidacy for the Delaware Senate. She stated that her focus would be health care and paid family and medical leave.

McBride won her election in November 2020, becoming the first transgender state senator in United States history. She replaced fellow Democrat Harris McDowell III, who retired at the end of his term. During her first term, she successfully sponsored the Healthy Delaware Families Act, which would allow families to take a paid 12-week family or medical leave. The law provides for workers to receive up to 80% of their current wages or a maximum of $900 per week, with the program paid for through automatic payroll contributions.

== United States House of Representatives ==
=== Elections ===
In June 2023, McBride announced her candidacy to represent Delaware's at-large congressional district in the 2024 election to replace Representative Lisa Blunt Rochester, who had announced she was running for the U.S. Senate seat left by retiring senator Tom Carper. Rochester endorsed McBride.

During her campaign for Congress, McBride emphasized her record of passing paid family and medical leave in Delaware, along with working to increase the minimum wage. Her key priorities also included protecting reproductive rights, expanding access to healthcare, and addressing economic insecurity. On September 10, 2024, McBride won the Democratic primary election for the 2024 United States House of Representatives election in Delaware, winning 80% of the votes against two other candidates, officially becoming the Democratic nominee. She won the general election in November 2024 with 58% of the vote, and became the first openly transgender member of the U.S. Congress on January 3, 2025. She won reelection in 2026.

=== Tenure ===
McBride stated in April 2026 that she had "been able to introduce more bipartisan bills here in Congress than any other freshman", noting the unanimously-passed Equal Opportunity for All Investors Act as an example.

In July 2026, the Congressional Management Foundation awarded McBride a Democracy Award in recognition of provision of constituent services; the Foundation said the award was for "exceptional casework and constituent support, including responsive systems, persistence, empathy, and strong problem-solving practices."

In 2026, Hakeem Jeffries selected McBride to co-lead the House Democratic Caregiving Working Group, a legislative policymaking body on caregiving for the Democratic Caucus. In November 2026, McBride was elected to co-chair the House Democratic Policy and Communications Committee.

=== Misgendering controversies ===
==== Congressional bathrooms ====
Two weeks after McBride's election to Congress, Republican representative Nancy Mace introduced a bill to ban transgender women from using the women's bathroom on Capitol Hill, saying that the bill specifically was meant to target McBride. Shortly thereafter, Republican House speaker Mike Johnson enacted a ban to the same effect. Johnson stated he believed in the policy but also in treating everyone with dignity. McBride subsequently announced that she would comply with the ban, saying "I'm not here to fight about bathrooms, I'm here to fight for Delawareans and to bring down costs facing families."

==== House floor and committee hearings ====
On February 7, 2025, Rep. Mary Miller was presiding and introduced McBride as "the gentleman from Delaware, Mr. McBride." Rep. McBride continued her floor speech without acknowledging the comment. The transcript in the congressional record was initially revised to read "gentlewoman" and "Ms. McBride". McBride later responded, "I'm not here to fight about pronouns. I'm here to make progress for Delawareans by lowering the cost of living and building a safer America."

On March 11, 2025, in a hearing of the Foreign Affairs Subcommittee on Europe, Chair Keith Self introduced McBride as "the representative from Delaware, Mr. McBride." McBride replied by thanking Self as "Madam chair". Ranking Member Bill Keating interrupted and responded to Self, "Mr. Chairman, have you no decency?" Self repeated "Mr. McBride", and attempted to continue the hearing, but Keating stated "You will not continue it with me unless you introduce a duly-elected representative the right way!" Keating's absence would deny the hearing a quorum, so Self adjourned the hearing. During the exchange, Self said, "we have set the standard on the House floor".

=== Committee assignments ===
- Committee on Foreign Affairs
  - Subcommittee on Europe
  - Subcommittee on Oversight and Accountability
- Committee on Science, Space, and Technology
  - Subcommittee on Research and Technology

=== Caucus memberships ===
- Congressional Equality Caucus (co-chair)
- Congressional Democratic Women's Caucus (whip)
- Congressional Progressive Caucus
- Future Forum
- New Democrat Coalition

== Political positions ==
=== Artificial intelligence ===
McBride said in 2026 that Congress must prioritize federal regulation of artificial intelligence "to guarantee that we are protecting workers, families, our health, our safety and our democracy."

=== Economy ===
McBride led an effort, joined by 86 other members of U.S. Congress, to reverse funding cuts to the Manufacturing Extension Partnership during the second presidency of Donald Trump. Delaware had been one of ten states notified of planned funding cuts. Funding was restored for fiscal year 2025 pending evaluation by the Department of Commerce. McBride said funding to the program should be protected indefinitely.

=== Family and medical leave ===
McBride has been an advocate for paid family and medical leave, both as a state and federal representative. She has said that her time caregiving for her late husband motivates her to expand paid leave protections.

McBride introduced the Flexible Leave Act with Republican Anna Paulina Luna, which would allow workers to take FMLA leave intermittently or on a reduced schedule without having to get employer approval first.

=== Foreign policy ===
==== Greenland ====
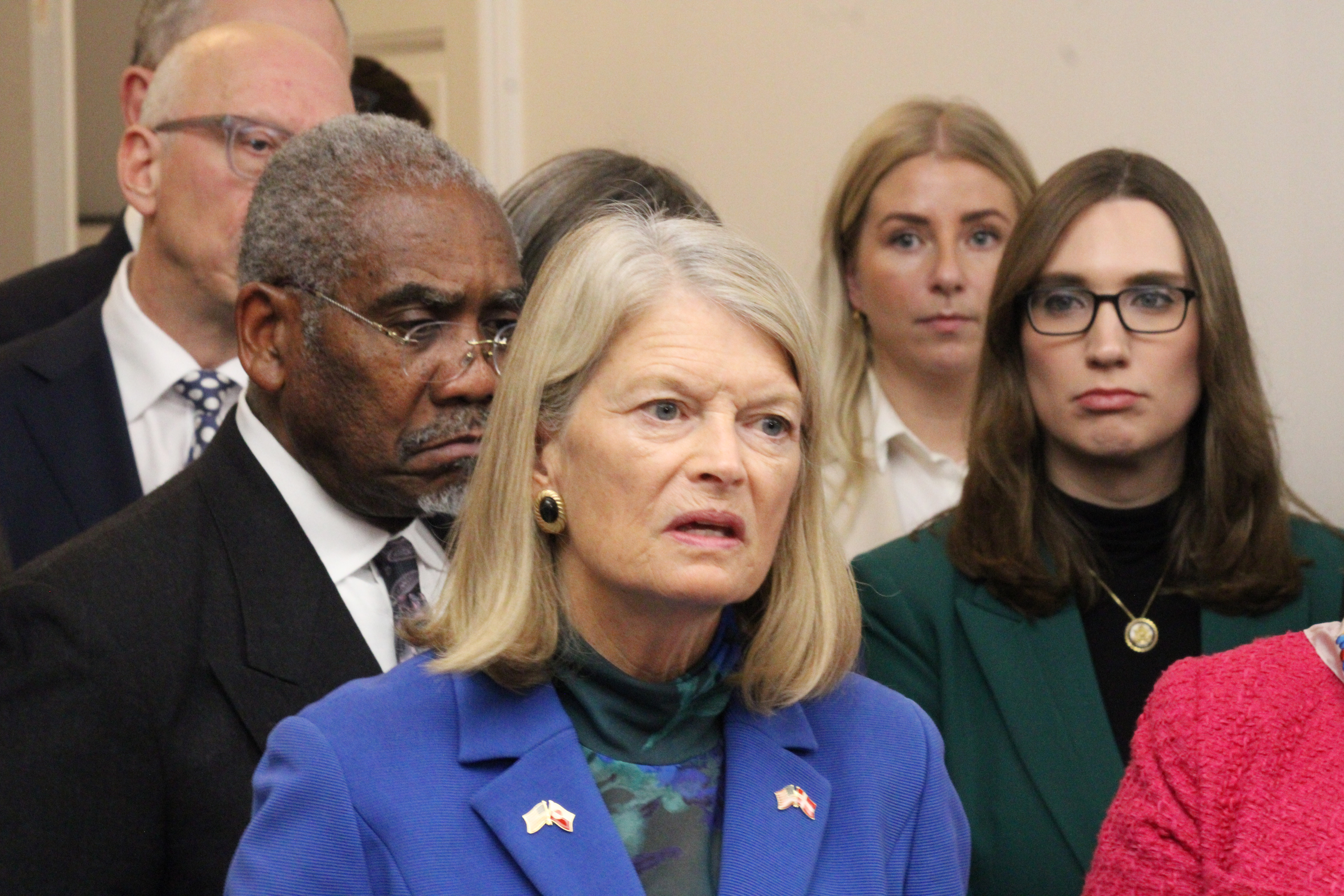
McBride at a press conference with Lisa Murkowski at Christiansborg in Copenhagen during the Greenland crisis, January 2026

As a member of the House Foreign Affairs Committee, McBride travelled in January 2026 to Copenhagen as part of a bipartisan congressional delegation in a show of support amid the Greenland crisis. The delegation, which also included senators Chris Coons, Lisa Murkowski, Jeanne Shaheen, and Thom Tillis, met with Danish and Greenlandic officials to underscore the value of their partnership and Denmark–US relations.

==== Iran ====
McBride has been critical of the US involvement in the 2026 Iran war. Following the February 2026 "Operation Epic Fury" strikes in Iran, she issued a statement condemning the military action. She has repeatedly voted in favor of House War Powers Resolutions aimed at compelling the United States to end its involvement in the war. In July she criticized the Trump Administration for not providing adequate information to Congress or the American people. She went on to state that the war had made Iran "stronger geopolitically than they were [before the war]" and "has resulted in not only higher gas prices, but higher costs for [Americans] across the board."

==== Israel ====
In an August 2023 interview with Jewish Insider, McBride "framed herself as a staunch supporter of Israel and the U.S.–Israel relationship, as well as a committed fighter against antisemitism". She has supported a two-state solution, American aid to Israel, and the Abraham Accords.

Following the outbreak of the Gaza war, McBride advocated for a ceasefire, and praised the ceasefire agreed to in January 2025. Following the International Criminal Court's decision to issue arrest warrants for Israeli Prime Minister Benjamin Netanyahu and Defense Minister Yoav Gallant, McBride voted against the Illegitimate Court Counteraction Act, which would impose sanctions against the Court. In July 2025, McBride criticized Benjamin Netanyahu's government for being responsible "for the famine in the Gaza Strip."

In July 2026, McBride voted in favor of Thomas Massie's amendment to the Department of State's national security appropriation that would have rescinded $3.3 billion in US aid to Israel. The amendment did not pass. AIPAC then closed its donor portal to Democrats who voted for the amendment.

==== Ukraine ====
McBride supported Biden's policy on Ukraine, and further supported the country during the Trump administration.

=== Health care ===
McBride has opposed efforts to reduce Medicaid spending. In March 2025, she joined Delaware Senators Chris Coons and Lisa Blunt Rochester in Wilmington to warn that the House Republican budget resolution would require Medicaid cuts that could cost Delaware about $200 million. She voted against the One Big Beautiful Bill Act in July 2025, describing it derisively as "Trumpcare" and saying it put health coverage for 54,000 Delawareans at risk. During the 2025 United States federal government shutdown, she supported Democrats' demand that enhanced Affordable Care Act premium tax credits be extended as part of any agreement to reopen the government.

=== Social policy ===
==== LGBTQ+ rights ====
In the Delaware Senate, McBride was the Senate sponsor of legislation banning the gay panic defense in criminal cases. Every senator cosponsored the bill, which passed unanimously and was signed into law on September 2023, making Delaware the 17th state to ban the defense.

In the House, McBride was an original cosponsor of the 2025 reintroduction of the Equality Act, and in November 2025, she introduced the Global Respect Act with Pennsylvania Republican Brian Fitzpatrick, which would sanction foreign officials responsible for human rights abuses against LGBTQ people. McBride criticized Executive Order 14168, signed by Donald Trump on his first day in the office, characterizing it as "red meat for his extreme base". She argued in 2025 on the The Ezra Klein Show that the LGBTQ movement had lost its focus on persuasion after the legalization of same-sex marriage and should avoid absolutist positions while trying to move public opinion.

She spoke out in 2025 against a proposed ban on transgender service members in the United States Armed Forces. Following Trump's Executive Order 14183, imposing a ban on transgender people serving in the military, McBride spoke at the retirement ceremony of transgender service members Colonel Bree Fram, Lieutenant Colonel Erin Krizek, Commander Blake Dremann, Sergeant First Class Cathrine Schmid, and Chief Petty Officer Jaida McGuire on January 8, 2026. McBride called the forced retirement of transgender military personnel "immoral, unfair, and un-American." In April 2026, she told the Washington Blade, "These are decorated service members who have been fired for no other reason than their gender identity. They deserve to be treated with dignity and fairness and judged on their merits."

== Personal life ==
McBride is an ordained Presbyterian elder. She has had an interest in the arts, film, and Lego brick models. In a 2024 interview with The Review (a student newspaper at the University of Delaware), McBride said she is a fan of the TV show Ted Lasso and Taylor Swift's music. McBride said she is "a nerd", and The Review reported she is a dog person. McBride stated that she considers Team of Rivals: The Political Genius of Abraham Lincoln to be a quality book on leadership. Her favorite dessert is crème brûlée and she often drinks coffee.

McBride came out to her parents, David and Sally, in 2011. McBride reflected that it "wasn't until I was student body president that I had the experiences and the courage". David stated, "I knew we were gonna be supportive of her the minute she came out to us." Sally said, "I was devastated ... Because I felt that she would be discriminated against at every turn." She also said, "She's the strongest, most resilient person I know." McBride's parents were honored with a Daily Point of Light Award in 2022 for their volunteer work, including for LGBTQ related issues.

In 2012, McBride met Andrew Cray, a trans man, lawyer, LGBTQ rights activist, healthcare advocate, and grandson of Cray founder Seymour Cray. They met at a White House reception, when McBride interned there, and they fell in love. They nicknamed each other "bean" or "beanie"; The Washington Post wrote that Cray was "the 'big bean' to her 'little bean,' a play on how she was a few inches taller than him." McBride became a caregiver for him while he was sick with cancer. McBride's mother wrote, "As it became increasingly clear that Andy's cancer was more aggressive than previously suspected, he asked Sarah to marry him. Dave and I gave our blessing." On August 24, 2014, McBride married Cray in a small, private wedding ceremony on their apartment rooftop in Washington, D.C. The ceremony was officiated by Episcopal bishop Gene Robinson. Four days after their wedding, Cray died from oral cancer, at age 28. McBride has written about Cray, including in her 2018 memoir. She said, "His kindness, his decency has provided for me a North Star."

== Electoral history ==
2020 Delaware Senate election, District 1
Primary election
Party	Candidate	Votes	%
Democratic	Sarah McBride	7,902	91.31
Democratic	Joseph McCole	752	8.69
Total votes		8,654	100.0
General election
Democratic	Sarah McBride	16,865	73.30
Republican	Steve Washington	6,144	26.70
Total votes		23,009	100.0

2022 Delaware Senate election, District 1
Party	Candidate	Votes	%
Democratic	Sarah McBride (incumbent)	13,204	100.0
Total votes		13,204	100.0

2024 United States House of Representatives election in Delaware
Primary election
Party	Candidate	Votes	%
Democratic	Sarah McBride	66,764	79.85
Democratic	Earl Cooper	13,557	16.22
Democratic	Elias Weir	3,286	3.93
Total votes		83,607	100.0
General election
Democratic	Sarah McBride	287,830	57.86
Republican	John Whalen	209,606	42.14
Total votes		497,436	100.0

2026 United States House of Representatives election in Delaware
Party	Candidate	Votes	%
Democratic	Sarah McBride (incumbent)	243,687	64.35
Republican	Joseph Arminio	135,016	35.65
Total votes		378,703	100.0

== Honors and awards ==
- Kinsman-Hurst Award (2013)
- Metro Weekly Next Generation Award (2014)
- Delaware's Order of the First State (2016)
- Gerald E. Kandler Memorial Award (2017)
- Biden School Civility in Public Service Award (2024)
- WP Theater's Annual Gala honoree (2025)
- Democracy Award for Best of Constituent Service (2026)

== Publications ==
=== Books ===
- Tomorrow Will Be Different: Love, Loss, and the Fight for Trans Equality, by Sarah McBride; foreword by Joe Biden; Crown Archetype (2018).
- Raising Kids Beyond the Binary: Celebrating God's Transgender and Gender-Diverse Children, by Jamie Bruesehoff, foreword by Sarah McBride; Broadleaf Books (2023).

=== Articles ===
- "Op-Ed: The Real Me"; The Eagle (American University); May 1, 2012. (republished in an expanded version a week later at the HuffPost)
- "Forever and Ever: Losing My Husband at 24"; HuffPost (2015).

== See also ==
- List of LGBTQ members of the United States Congress
- List of transgender public officeholders in the United States
- Women in the United States House of Representatives

U.S. House of Representatives
Preceded by Lisa Blunt Rochester	Member of the U.S. House of Representatives from Delaware's at-large congressional district 2025–present	Incumbent
U.S. order of precedence (ceremonial)
Preceded by John Mannion	United States representatives by seniority 399th	Succeeded by April McClain Delaney
