= State of Firsts =

2025 American documentary film

- Directed by: Chase Joynt
- Produced by: Jenna Kelly, Justin Lacob
- Starring: Sarah McBride
- Cinematography: Melissa Langer
- Edited by: Chris McNabb
- Production companies: Optimist, XTR, Level Ground
- Release date: 2025
- Running time: 93 minutes
- Country: United States
- Language: English

State of Firsts is a 2025 documentary film directed by Chase Joynt that follows the historic election and political journey of U.S. Representative Sarah McBride, the first openly transgender person elected to the United States Congress. The film premiered at Tribeca Film Festival on June 11, 2025.

== Plot ==
The film follows Sarah McBride during her campaign for Congress and the period after her historic election, documenting her efforts to navigate political responsibilities while facing public scrutiny and opposition tied to her identity. It highlights her responses to challenges in Washington, as well as the personal and professional pressures of becoming the first openly transgender member of the U.S. Congress.

The film includes a conversation between McBride and fellow U.S. Representative Alexandria Ocasio-Cortez, in which they discuss the pressures of being "firsts" in Congress and the challenges of navigating public attention and political scrutiny.

== Production ==
State of Firsts was directed by Chase Joynt and filmed with immersive, behind-the-scenes access during Sarah McBride's 2024 congressional campaign and early tenure in office.

== Release ==
State of Firsts made its world premiere at Tribeca Film Festival 2025. It also premiered at DC/DOX Film Festival 2025. The film was released in select theaters on June 12, 2026.

== Reception ==
The Hollywood Reporter noted that State of Firsts presents a multifaceted portrayal of McBride, depicting her simultaneously as a public official and a symbolic figure. The review highlighted the film's focus on her efforts to balance these roles, suggesting that its exploration of the pressures and limitations of representation adds complexity beyond a purely celebratory narrative.
