= Mark Takano =

American politician (born 1960)

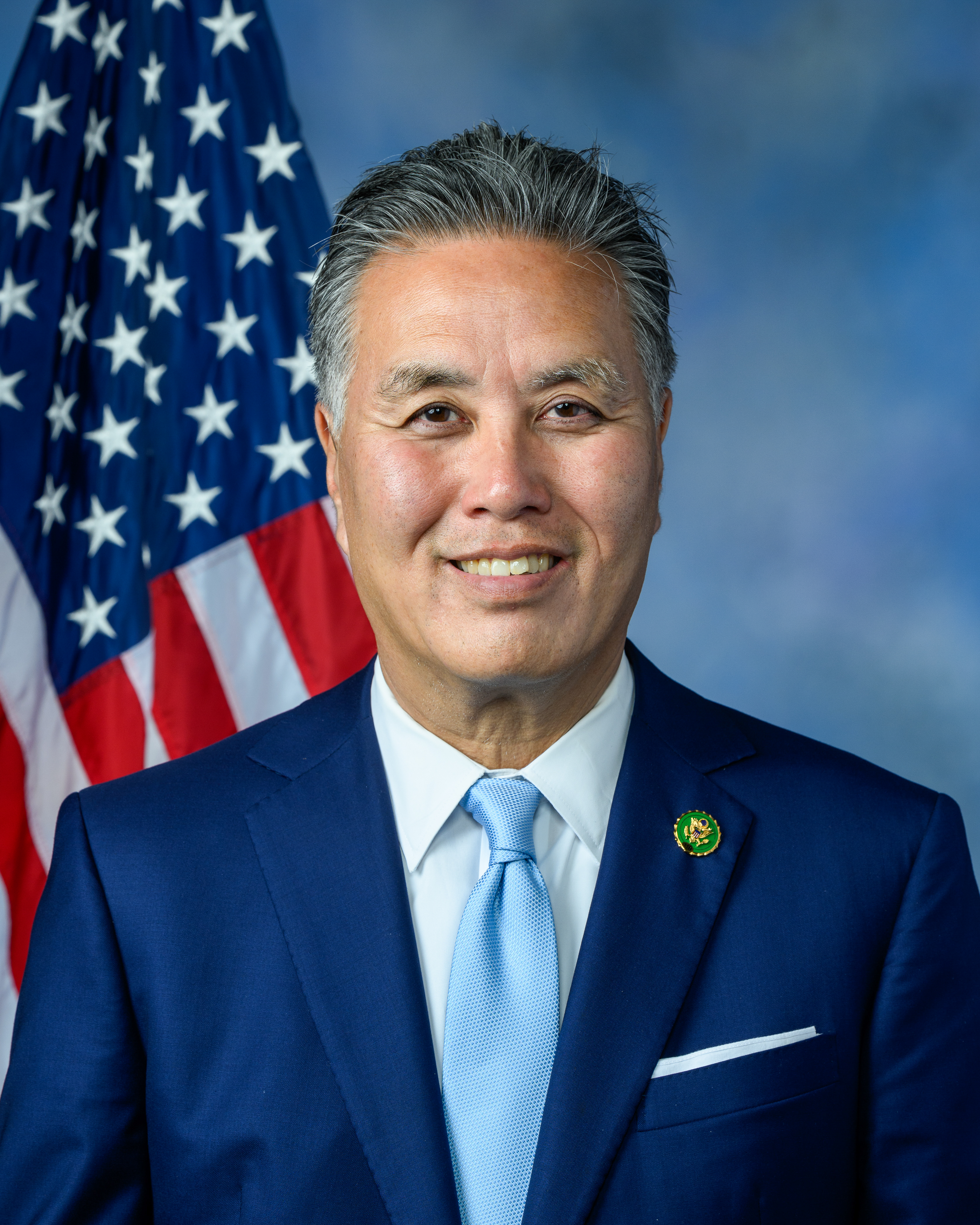
- Official portrait, 2023

Ranking Member of the House Veterans' Affairs Committee
- Incumbent
- Assumed office January 3, 2023
- Preceded by: Mike Bost
- In office July 8, 2016 – January 3, 2017; Acting
- Preceded by: Corrine Brown
- Succeeded by: Tim Walz

Chair of the House Veterans' Affairs Committee
- In office January 3, 2019 – January 3, 2023
- Preceded by: Phil Roe
- Succeeded by: Mike Bost

Member of the U.S. House of Representatives from California
- Incumbent
- Assumed office January 3, 2013
- Preceded by: Jerry Lewis (redistricted)
- Constituency: 41st district (2013–2023); 39th district (2023–present)

Personal details
- Born: Mark Allan Takano; December 10, 1960 (age 65) Riverside, California, U.S.
- Party: Republican (before 1983); Democratic (1983–present)
- Education: Harvard University (BA); University of California, Riverside (MFA)
- Website: House website Campaign website
- Takano's voice Takano on a bill to aid veterans exposed to toxic substances post-9/11. Recorded March 3, 2022

Mark Allan Takano (/təˈkɑːnoʊ/ tə-KAH-noh; born December 10, 1960) is an American politician and academic who has served in the United States House of Representatives since 2013, representing California's 41st congressional district from 2013 to 2023 and the 39th congressional district since 2023. A member of the Democratic Party, Takano became the first gay person of Asian descent in Congress upon taking office.

== Early life, education, and academic career ==
Takano was born in 1960 in Riverside, California. His family was relocated and interned from California to a "War Relocation Camp" during World War II. He is Sansei, that is, the grandson of people born in Japan who immigrated to the United States. He attended La Sierra High School in the Alvord Unified School District, where he graduated as class valedictorian. In high school, he also participated in the Junior State of America, a national student-run organization centered around debate and civic engagement in young people, and was elected lieutenant governor of the Southern California State. He graduated from Harvard University with a B.A. in government in 1983 and from the University of California, Riverside with an MFA in creative writing for the performing arts in 2010.

Takano taught British literature in public schools for 23 years. He was a member of the Republican Party through college, then he became a member of the Democratic Party. In 1990 he was elected to the Riverside Community College Board of Trustees. While on the board, he shepherded a measure that gave college employees domestic partner benefits.

== U.S. House of Representatives ==
=== Elections ===
==== 1992 ====
Takano ran for the United States House of Representatives in California's 43rd congressional district. He won a seven-candidate Democratic primary with 29% of the vote. Republican Ken Calvert defeated Takano by 519 votes, 47%–46%.

==== 1994 ====
Takano defeated Raven Lopez Workman in the Democratic primary, 70%–30%. During the campaign, Republican State Assemblyman Ray Haynes outed Takano, calling him a "homosexual liberal". In the general election, Calvert defeated Takano, 55%–38%.

==== 2012 ====
In July 2011, Takano announced he would run for the House in the newly redrawn 41st congressional district, established in the redistricting following the 2010 United States census. Five candidates ran for the open seat. In the June 2012 open primary, John Tavaglione, a Republican who sat on the Riverside County Board of Supervisors, ranked first with 45% of the votes. Takano ranked second with 37%. In the November general election, Takano defeated Tavaglione, 58%–42%. Takano became the first openly gay non-white member of the House.

=== Committee assignments ===
For the 119th Congress:

- Committee on Education and the Workforce
  - Subcommittee on Health, Employment, Labor and Pensions
  - Subcommittee on Higher Education and Workforce Development
  - Subcommittee on Workforce Protections
- Committee on Veterans' Affairs (Ranking Member)

=== Caucus memberships ===
- Black Maternal Health Caucus
- Congressional LGBTQ+ Equality Caucus (chair)
- Congressional Progressive Caucus
- Medicare for All Caucus
- Congressional Energy Storage Caucus (co-chair)

After Corrine Brown's indictment on July 8, 2016, she temporarily stepped down as ranking member of the Veterans Committee, leaving Takano as acting ranking member until the end of the 114th Congress. When the Democrats took the House majority after the 2018 elections, Takano became the chair of the committee.

=== Tenure ===
When Representative Bill Cassidy circulated a draft letter opposing an immigration reform bill in 2013, asking for signatures, Takano marked it up in red pen like a high school assignment and gave it an F, with comments like, "exaggeration – avoid hyperbole."

Takano co-chairs the Congressional LGBT Equality Caucus and is a member of the Congressional Progressive Caucus, the Congressional Arts Caucus, the Congressional Asian Pacific American Caucus, the United States Congressional International Conservation Caucus, U.S.-Japan Caucus, and the Advanced Energy Storage Caucus.

For his tenure as the chairman of the House Veterans' Affairs Committee in the 116th Congress, Takano earned an "A" grade from the nonpartisan Lugar Center's Congressional Oversight Hearing Index.

== Political positions ==
=== Abortion ===
As of 2022, Takano has a 100% rating from NARAL Pro-Choice America and an F grade from the Susan B. Anthony List for his abortion-related voting record. He opposed the overturning of Roe v. Wade, calling it "offensive and radical".

=== Donald Trump ===
Takano supported both impeachments of Donald Trump.

=== Gun control ===
Takano supports gun control efforts. In the wake of the 2015 San Bernardino attack, he criticized Congress for its inability to pass gun control laws, describing the shooting in San Bernardino as "the cost of inaction."

=== Foreign policy ===
In March 2024, Takano criticized Israel's actions in the Gaza war. He is in support of a two‑state solution.

=== Transgender rights ===
Takano is a supporter of transgender rights, and was against the passing of H.R. 734: Protection of Women and Girls in Sports Act. Takano appeared in the film What is a Woman?, being interviewed by Matt Walsh. The interview broached the topic of trans bathroom use, to which Takano responded by defending his belief in transgender identities before abruptly exiting the interview. While exiting, he ignored Walsh's attempts to ask him what a woman is.

Following Trump's Executive Order 14183, imposing a ban on transgender people serving in the United States Armed Forces, Takano attended the retirement ceremony of transgender service members Colonel Bree Fram, Lieutenant Colonel Erin Krizek, Commander Blake Dremann, Sergeant First Class Cathrine Schmid, and Chief Petty Officer Jaida McGuire on January 8, 2026. He apologized to transgender service-members for their forced retirement and claimed the Trump administration chose to target transgender people "for no reason other than cruelty."

=== 2020 presidential election ===
Takano endorsed Bernie Sanders in the presidential primary election, saying Sanders "has a bold vision" and "can get things done". After Sanders dropped out of the primaries, Takano endorsed Democratic nominee Joe Biden.

=== 2024 presidential election ===
On July 20, 2024, Takano called for Joe Biden to withdraw from the 2024 United States presidential election.

== See also ==
- List of Asian Americans and Pacific Islands Americans in the United States Congress
- List of LGBT members of the United States Congress

U.S. House of Representatives
Preceded by Jerry Lewis	Member of the U.S. House of Representatives from California's 41st congressional district 2013–2023	Succeeded by Ken Calvert
Preceded by Corrine Brown	Ranking Member of the House Veterans' Affairs Committee; Acting; 2016–2017	Succeeded by Tim Walz
Preceded by Phil Roe	Chair of the House Veterans' Affairs Committee; 2019–2023	Succeeded by Mike Bost
Preceded by Young Kim	Member of the U.S. House of Representatives from California's 39th congressional district 2023–present	Incumbent
Preceded by Mike Bost	Ranking Member of the House Veterans' Affairs Committee; 2023–present	Incumbent
Preceded by Mark Pocan	Chair of the Congressional Equality Caucus; 2025–present	Incumbent
U.S. order of precedence (ceremonial)
Preceded by Raul Ruiz	United States representatives by seniority 113th	Succeeded by Juan Vargas
