= Oakland Historic District (Oakland, Oregon) =

Historic district in Oregon, United States

- U.S. National Register of Historic Places
- U.S. Historic district
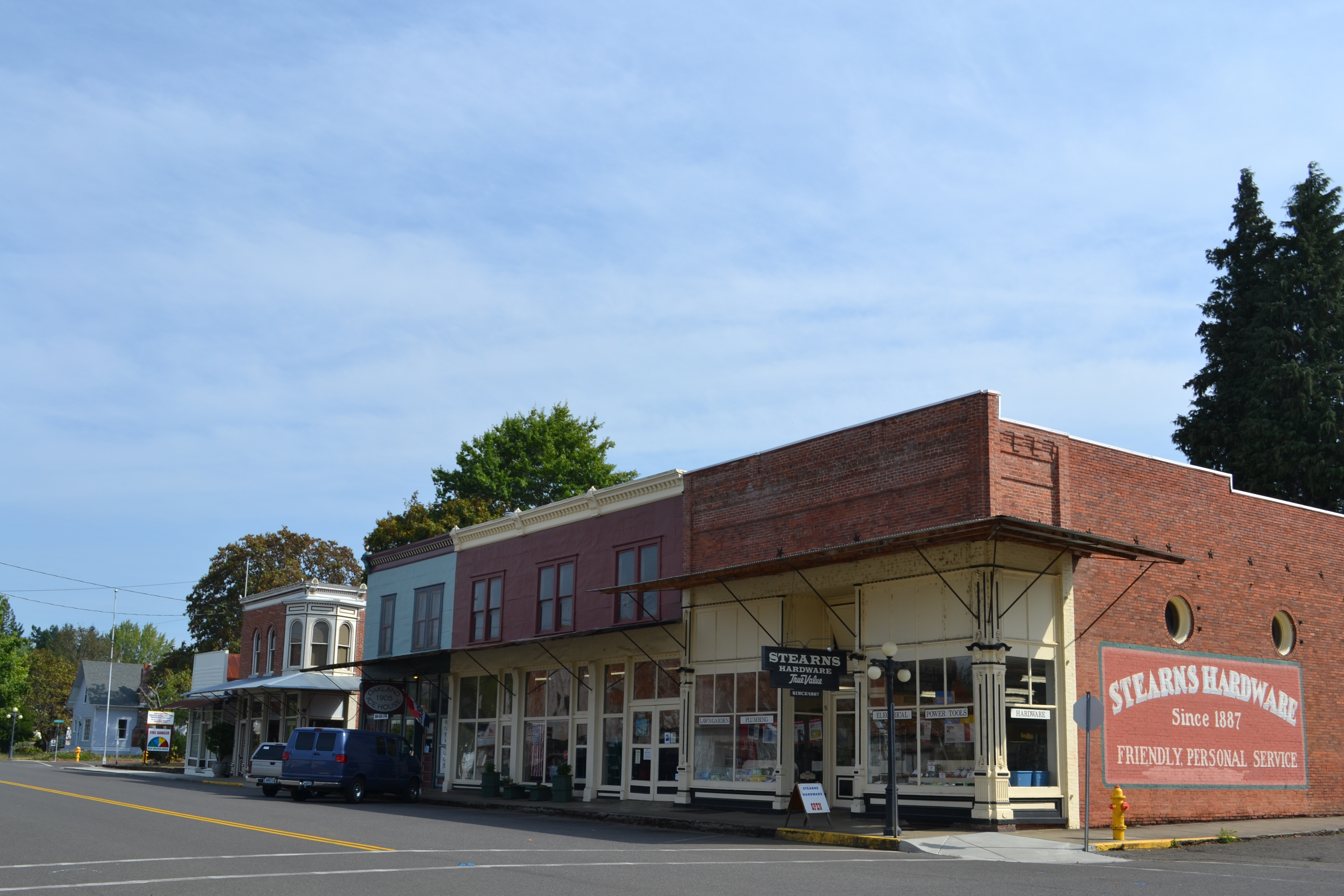
- Location: Roughly bounded by Chestnut, 1st, Cedar, and 8th Sts., Oakland, Oregon
- Coordinates: 43°25′21″N 123°17′51″W
- Built: 1825
- Architect: Multiple
- Architectural style: Classical Revival, Italianate, Queen Anne
- NRHP reference No.: 79002058
- Added to NRHP: March 30, 1979

The Oakland Historic District is a historic district within the city of Oakland, Oregon, United States. It was listed on the National Register of Historic Places in 1979.

One contributing property is the Stearns Hardware Store building that was built in 1891.

== See also ==
- Media related to Oakland Historic District at Wikimedia Commons
