= Erin Krizek =

American military officer

Personal details
- Occupation: aviator military officer

Military service
- Branch/service: United States Air Force
- Years of service: 2005–2025
- Rank: Lieutenant colonel
- Unit: 319th Reconnaissance Wing
- Battles/wars: Operation Iraqi Freedom; Operation Enduring Freedom

Erin Krizek is an American retired military officer and aviator. She served as deputy director of operations for the 319th Reconnaissance Wing. Krizek was forced to resign from the United States Air Force in 2026 following President Donald Trump's Executive Order 14183, which banned transgender people from military service.

== Career ==
Krizek served in the United States Air Force for twenty years. Throughout her career, she served as a pilot in intelligence, reconnaissance, and surveillance, flying crewed and uncrewed platforms as part of Operation Iraqi Freedom and Operation Enduring Freedom.

She was an E-11A pilot and the assistant director of operations for two airborne command-and-control squadrons at Robins Air Force Base in Houston County, Georgia. Krizek was later appointed the deputy director of operations for the 319th Reconnaissance Wing, supporting over 2,200 personnel in six military bases. Krizek also worked on developing the Northrop Grumman RQ-4 Global Hawk for NATO.

Her call sign was "Kraken". She was given the call sign while piloting an E3 AWACS over Denali in Alaska, as part of a Red Flag military exercise. During the exercise, she experienced depressurization when one of the small eyebrow windows on the aircraft cracked at 31,000 feet in the air. She ran a checklist and brought the plane back early but, weeks later, the No. 1 pilot window cracked, which led to Krizek putting on smoke goggles and oxygen mask in preparation before initiating a descent to 14,000 feet.

=== Forced retirement ===
Following President Donald Trump's Executive Order 14183, which effectively barred transgender people from military service, Krizek was forced to retire from the Air Force. Her retirement was commemorated, along with Colonel Bree Fram, Commander Blake Dremann, Sergeant First Class Cathrine Schmid, and Chief Petty Officer Jaida McGuire, at a ceremony hosted by the Human Rights Campaign Foundation on January 8, 2026, in Washington, D.C.. The ceremony was presided over by retired U.S. Army General Stanley A. McChrystal and featured remarks from Congressman Mark Takano, Congresswoman Sarah McBride, retired Major General Tammy Smith, and Shawn Skelly, the former Assistant Secretary of Defense for Readiness and Force Management.

== Personal life ==
Krizek lives in Washington state and is a supporter of the Seattle Kraken. She is married to Nicole Krizek, and has three children. Her daughter, Isabella Krizek, presided over her retirement in January 2026.

She is an openly trans woman.
