= Stearns Hardware Store =

Historic building in Oregon, U.S.

- Stearns Hardware Building
- U.S. Historic district – Contributing property
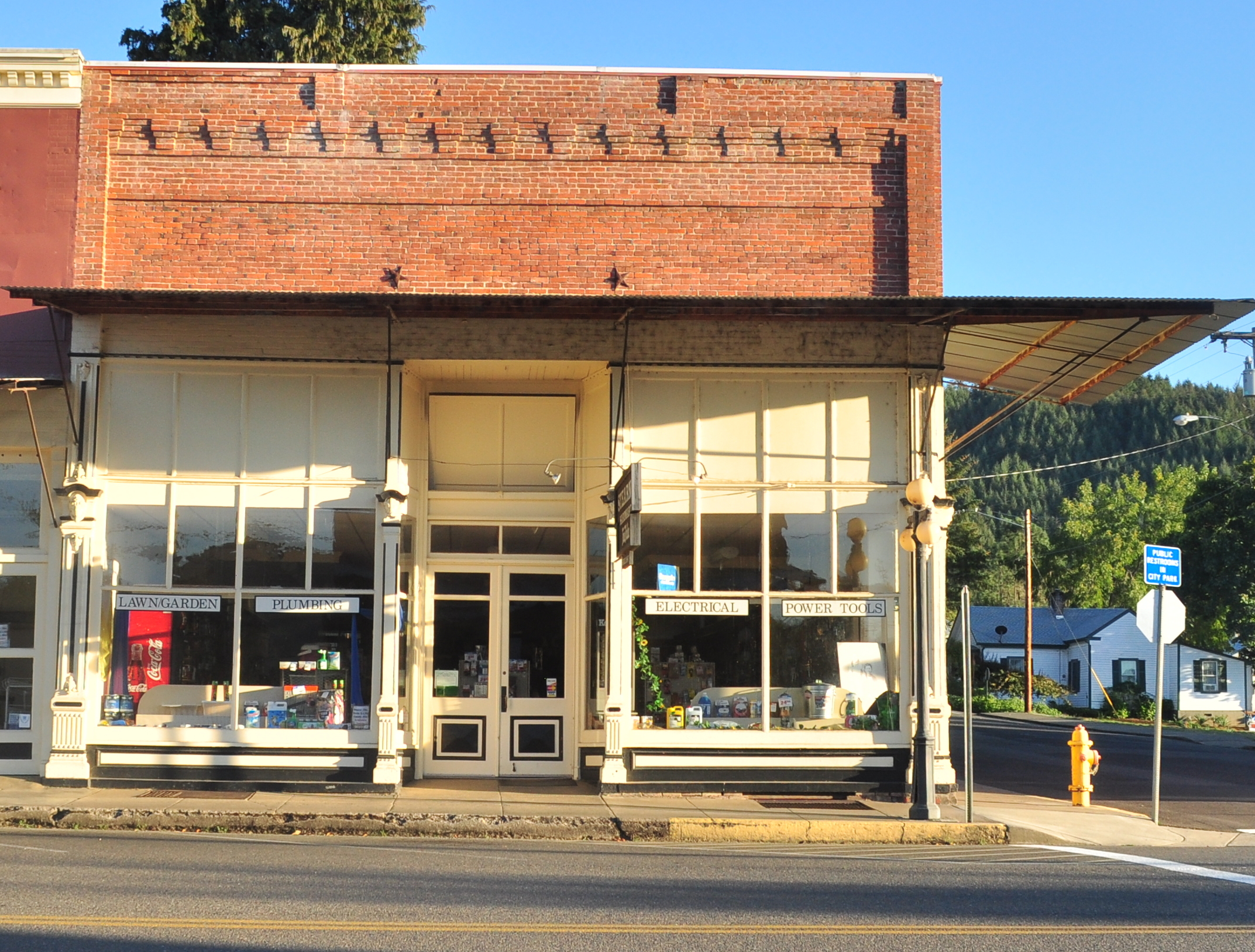

- Location within Oregon Location within the United States
- Location: 204 Locust Street, Oakland, Oregon
- Coordinates: 43°25′20″N 123°17′53″W
- Built: 1891
- Architectural style: Brick Masonry
- Part of: Oakland Historic District (Oakland, Oregon) (ID79002058)
- Designated CP: March 30, 1979

The Stearns Hardware Building is a historic commercial building in Oakland, Oregon, United States. The building is one of the oldest structures in Oakland, Oregon and houses a hardware store that has been family owned and operated by the Stearns family since 1887. The brick masonry structure, built in 1891, was added to the National Register of Historic Places in 1979 as a contributing property of the Oakland Historic District. It is located at 204 Locust Street, Oakland Railroad Addition, Block 20, westerly 75.33 1 of Lots 5 and 6 in Oakland, Oregon.

== History ==
This building houses the Stearns Hardware business that has been in continuous ownership by the Stearns family since 1887. George Stearns was the original owner of the building and had it built in 1891 by G.N. Fraser out of Eugene, Oregon.

An addition was completed in 1905 to the east side of the original building that replaced a large wagon shed. That addition was jointly built by R.E. Dimmick and George Stearns originally as an ice house, butcher shop and sausage factory, with an upper level that was used as a doctor's office. It housed R.E. Dimmick's business operations and part of the Stearns Hardware Store. This addition is no longer part of the Stearns Hardware Store. At one time, that addition was used as a gallery, plant shop, and upstairs residence.

== Architecture and layout ==
The building itself is two stories in a square 75-by-75-foot (23 m × 23 m) layout. It's built with brick masonry. The entirety of the structure is the combination of two structures that were built 14 years apart. The original part is on the west end. It was originally 25 by 75 feet (7.6 m × 22.9 m) with a single story. This original structure had three bays on the north (front) elevation. The center bay has recessed and angled display windows combined with double doors. Adjacent on either side of that bay are tall segmented windows. Each of these bays are separated by a decorative cast iron pier with the inscriptions "G.N. FRASER, 1891, EUGENE." The building has a single pitch roof with a parapet that is highest on the front elevation. Older photos suggest that the parapet was four feet (1.2 m) lower in 1979 when it was listed than when it was originally built.

The additional building on the east end continues the wood frame in front. The south (rear) wall and two adjoining common walls are made of brick. There are five bays in this additional portion including two single door entrances with adjacent tall segmented windows. The second story on the front (north) has three bays. The front siding of this portion is embossed with simulated brick sheet metal. Additionally there is a box cornice with dentils and modillions which also extend east to the building next-door. This addition also has a single pitch roof.
