= Tammy Smith =

American Army major general

Tammy S. Smith
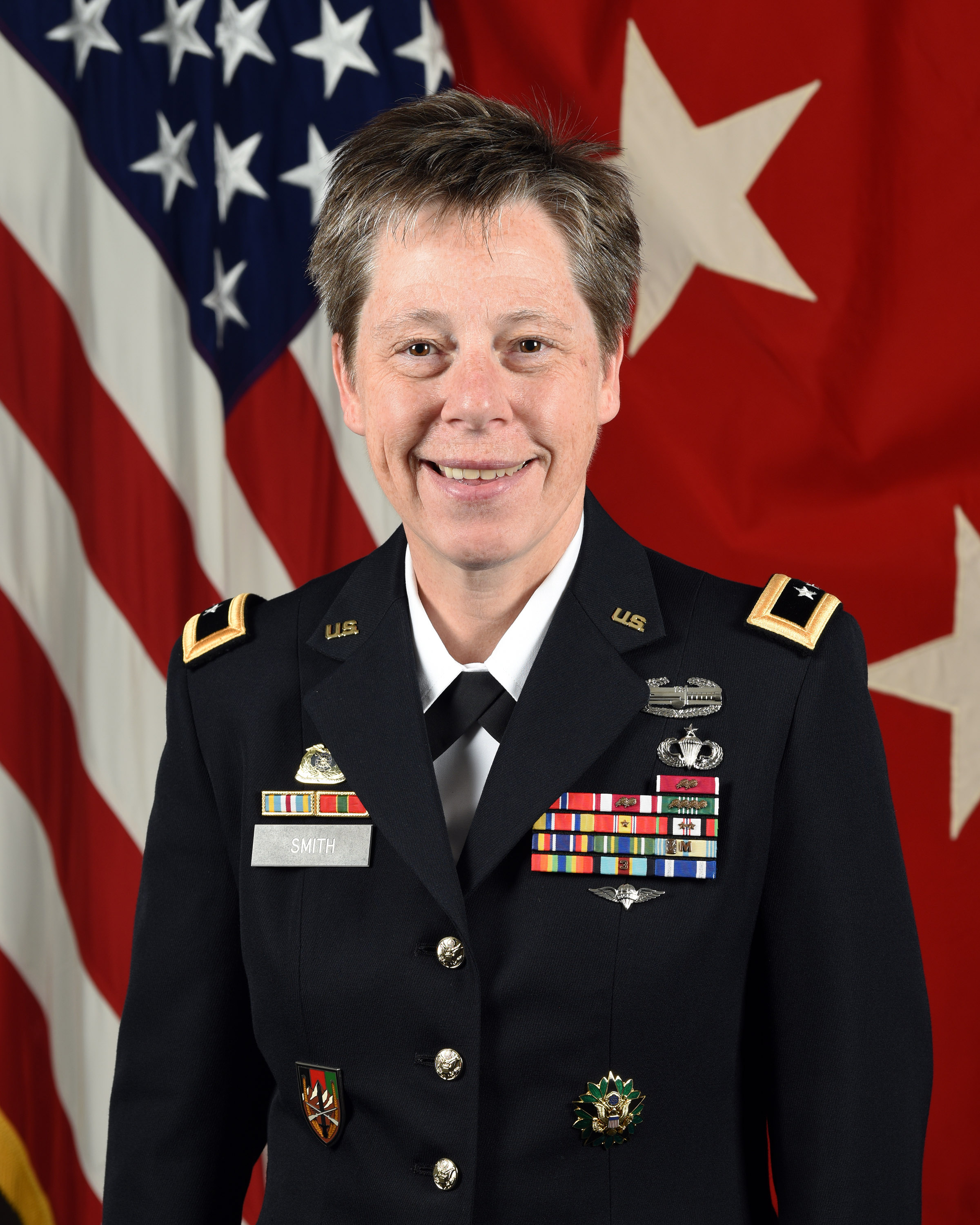
- Smith in 2019
- Born: 1963 (age 62–63); Oakland, Oregon
- Military career
- Allegiance: United States
- Branch: United States Army
- Service years: 1986–2021
- Rank: Major General
- Commands: 98th Training Division (Initial Entry Training)
- Conflicts: War in Afghanistan
- Awards: Army Distinguished Service Medal; Legion of Merit (3); Bronze Star Medal

Tammy S. Smith is a retired major general of the United States Army Reserve. She last served as Special Assistant to the Assistant Secretary of the Army (Manpower and Reserve Affairs). She formerly served as Assistant Deputy Chief of Staff, Mobilization and Reserve Affairs and before that as Deputy Commanding General – Sustainment, Eighth United States Army. As such, she is the first female general officer to serve in an Eighth Army headquarters-level position. Smith also has tours as commanding general of the 98th Training Division (Initial Entry Training), and served for a year in the War in Afghanistan.

Smith received her confirmation to the rank of major general on July 13, 2016, and was formally promoted to the position in a ceremony at the United States Army Garrison Yongsan in Seoul, Korea. She retired from the army effective 30 April 2021.

== Early life ==
Smith is a native of Oakland, Oregon, graduating from Oakland High School. She was active in many activities but attributes her interest in both the practice and study of leadership to her participation in the Future Farmers of America (FFA). Her FFA advisor was a dynamic, enthusiastic high school agriculture teacher who taught his students both how to dream and how to set goals. He also taught his students to knuckle down and do the work required to achieve those goals. While in FFA, she participated in both prepared and extemporaneous public speaking competitions as well as maintaining various livestock projects. Smith delayed college for one year after graduating high school to serve as the State Reporter for the Oregon FFA Association. In this role she traveled the state as an FFA representative, conducting leadership camps and speaking at FFA chapters about leadership and goal setting.

== Military career ==
Smith was recipient of a four-year Reserve Officer Training Corps (ROTC) scholarship and graduated from the University of Oregon in 1986. She was commissioned as a second lieutenant in the Quartermaster Corps. The University of Oregon has produced the highest number of general officers of all non-military ROTC schools nationwide. A total of 47 flag officers are associated with the University of Oregon. Smith is number 46 and is the first female.

Smith has served as a platoon leader, 193d Support Battalion, Fort Clayton, Panama; logistic support detachment commander, Task Force 36, "Exercise Camino De La Paz, Bridges of Peace," Osa Peninsula, Costa Rica; Bravo Company commander, 3–28th Infantry Battalion (Basic Combat Training), Fort Jackson, South Carolina; Brigade S-4, 1st Brigade (Basic Combat Training), Fort Jackson, South Carolina; senior supply company observer/controller, Forward Support Battalion Team, Joint Readiness Training Center, Fort Polk, Louisiana; Delta Company commander, 1–321st Infantry Battalion (Basic Combat Training), Fort Jackson, South Carolina; S-1/S-4, Headquarters, Reserve Officer Training Brigade, Charlotte, North Carolina; S-3, 3–321st Infantry Battalion (Basic Combat Training), Clemson, South Carolina; mobilization planner, 99th Regional Readiness Command, Oakdale, Pennsylvania; secretary to the general staff, 99th Regional Readiness Command, Coraopolis, Pennsylvania; readiness staff officer, Department of the Army G-3 (DAMO-ODR), The Pentagon, Washington, D.C.; operations officer, Office of the Chief, Army Reserve, Arlington, Virginia; chief of General Officer Management Office, Office of the Chief, Army Reserve, Arlington, Virginia; chief of Army Reserve Affairs, United States Forces-Afghanistan (USFOR-A), Operation Enduring Freedom. She served again as chief of General Officer Management Office and was dual-hatted as director of Senior Leader Development Office for the Army Reserve, The Pentagon, Washington, D.C., director of human capital for the United States Army Reserve, The Pentagon, Washington, D.C. As the director of human capital, she was responsible for integrating strategic human resources policy with operational requirements to improve and sustain long-term personnel readiness across the United States Army Reserve. She also served as Deputy chief of staff of Army Reserve, Fort Belvoir, Virginia, and commanding general of the 98th Training Division, Fort Benning, Georgia. Smith currently serves as the deputy commanding general-sustainment of the Eighth Army, Korea.

The majority of Smith's work history prior to assignment as the deputy commanding general-sustainment of the Eighth Army has been as an active component officer and member of the Active/Guard and Reserve Program.

On January 8, 2026, Smith served as master of ceremonies at a retirement ceremony for transgender service members Colonel Bree Fram, Lieutenant Colonel Erin Krizek, Commander Blake Dremann, Sergeant First Class Cathrine Schmid, and Chief Petty Officer Jaida McGuire following President Donald Trump's transgender military ban.

== Education ==
Smith holds a Doctor of Management degree in organizational leadership from the University of Phoenix and is a member of the Delta Mu Delta International Business Honor Society. Her research focus was executive leadership and senior leader transitions into new organizations. She received an honorary Doctorate of Humane Letters from Lincoln University. She holds a Master of Arts in management from Webster University. She also holds a master's in strategic studies as a graduate of the United States Army War College.

== Awards and accolades ==
Smith's awards and decorations include: Army Distinguished Service Medal, Legion of Merit (2 oak leaf clusters), Bronze Star Medal, Meritorious Service Medals (2 oak leaf clusters), Army Commendation Medals (4 oak leaf clusters), Afghanistan Campaign Medal, Combat Action Badge, Senior Parachutist Badge, Parachute Rigger Badge, and the Army Staff Identification Badge. Smith was inducted into the National Army ROTC Hall of Fame.

== Civilian awards and recognition ==
- Towleroad I'm Gay: The 50 Most Powerful Coming Outs of 2012
- Wisconsin Gazette The Top Coming-Out Stores of 2012
- Out Magazine
- Knights Out Courage Award. West Point (2013)
- Out & Equal Workplace Advocates Advocacy Award (2013)
- More magazine's 2013 Fierce List; 50 Women Who Made Brave Stands.
- Women of Color magazine's Top Women in the U.S. Armed Forces
- Diversity Journal Women Worth Watching in 2015– 13th annual Celebration of Women in Leadership
- National Journal The 30 Most Influential OUT Washingtonians
- Trevor Project LGBT Women who Inspire the Future
- Grand Marshal Washington DC Capital Pride Parade
- International Jose Julio Sarria Civil Rights Award
- Girl Scouts of Connecticut Women of Merit Award
- American Veterans for Equal Rights (AVER) Life Membership
- Tagg Magazine
- Famous LGBT People
- Time Magazine: Sally Ride Tributes to those we lost in 2012
- LGBT History Month 2016 Icon

== Personal life ==
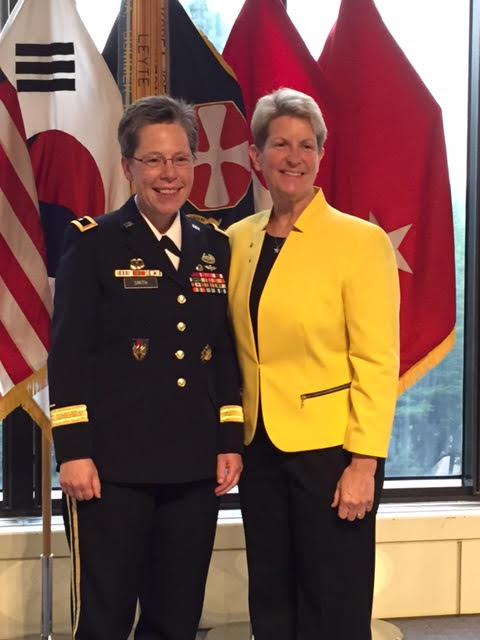
Smith and her wife Tracey Hepner during Smith's promotion ceremony at the United States Army Garrison Yongsan in Seoul, Korea.

Smith married Tracey Hepner on 31 March 2012, in a ceremony at the Jefferson Memorial in Washington, D.C. The ceremony was officiated by a military chaplain. The District of Columbia began recognizing same-sex marriages in 2010, but because Smith was in the army she could not enter into a marriage until after Don't ask, don't tell was repealed. She is the first openly gay United States flag officer to come out while serving since the repeal of the policy.

Hepner co-founded the Military Partners and Families Coalition, a national military family organization that provides support, education, resources and advocacy for lesbian, gay bisexual and transgender military partners and their families. On 11 February 2013, Hepner was announced as a personal guest of First Lady Michelle Obama for the 2013 State of the Union Address.

Smith and her spouse Tracey Hepner are active in volunteer military family support events.

In the 2024 United States presidential election, Smith endorsed Kamala Harris.

== See also ==
- List of female United States military generals and flag officers
- Sexual orientation and the United States military
