= LGBTQ rights in Delaware =

- Delaware (USA)
- Legal status: Legal since 1973
- Gender identity: Transgender persons allowed to change legal gender
- Discrimination protections: Yes, both sexual orientation and gender identity

Family rights
- Recognition of relationships: Same-sex marriage since 2013
- Adoption: Full adoption rights since 2012

Lesbian, gay, bisexual, transgender, and queer (LGBTQ) people in the U.S. state of Delaware enjoy the same legal protections as non-LGBTQ people. Same-sex sexual activity has been legal in Delaware since January 1, 1973. On January 1, 2012, civil unions became available to same-sex couples, granting them the "rights, benefits, protections, and responsibilities" of married persons. Delaware legalized same-sex marriage on July 1, 2013.

State law bans discrimination on the basis of sexual orientation and gender identity, and the state has legally banned the practice of conversion therapy on minors since July 2018. Delaware is frequently referred to as one of the United States' most LGBTQ-friendly states. A majority of Delawareans support same-sex marriage.

== Laws against same-sex sexual activity ==
Delaware repealed its sodomy law in July 1972. The repeal of the sodomy law became effective on January 1, 1973.

== Gay and trans panic defense law ==
In May 2023, a bill (HB142) was introduced to the Delaware General Assembly to formally repeal the archaic common-law "gay and trans panic defense" and ban its usage. Virginia, Washington, D.C., and Maryland surrounding Delaware have repealed any or the usage of the gay and trans panic defense within legislation. In June 2023, the bill (HB142) formally passed both houses of the Delaware Legislature - to abolish and remove the "gay and trans panic defense" within common-law. The Governor of Delaware has yet to either sign or veto the bill.

== Recognition of same-sex relationships ==
In March 2011, state senators David P. Sokola and Melanie George introduced a bill to create civil unions in Delaware. It was approved by the Delaware Legislature. Governor Jack Markell signed the legislation on May 11, 2011, and it took effect on January 1, 2012. In 2012, Delaware issued at least 565 civil union licenses, much higher than advocates had anticipated.

In March 2012, Markell said he thought that the legalization of same-sex marriage in Delaware was "inevitable" and would be passed "probably within the next few years". In September, Representative Pete Schwartzkopf said he expected the General Assembly to vote on same-sex marriage in 2013 and that he would support it, but was uncertain of the legislation's prospects. A bill to allow same-sex marriage and convert civil unions to marriages passed the Delaware House by a vote of 23 to 18 on April 23. The Senate approved it by a vote of 12 to 9 on May 7, and that same day the Governor signed the legislation, which went into effect July 1, 2013.

== Adoption and parenting ==
Delaware law permits any unmarried adult or married couple to petition a court for adoption of a child. The first second-parent adoption involving a same-sex couple occurred in October 2001. Since January 2012, same-sex couples in a civil union or marriage have had the same adoption rights as opposite-sex couples.

== Discrimination protections and hate crime legislation ==
The University of Delaware's policy on both discrimination and harassment has included sexual orientation since 1990.

Since 2009, Delaware law has prohibited discrimination on the basis of actual or perceived sexual orientation in employment, housing, public accommodations, and other areas. Since 2013, Delaware law has prohibited discrimination on the basis of actual or perceived gender identity in employment, housing, public accommodations, and other areas. Bill SB 97 that prohibits discrimination on the basis of actual or perceived gender identity passed the Senate by a vote of 11-7 on June 6, 2013. The House later passed it by a vote of 24-17 with amendments. The Senate approved the amendments by a vote of 11-9 on June 18, and then a day later it was signed into law by the Governor. The law went into effect immediately.

Governor Jack Markell issued an executive order on August 11, 2009, that protects employees of state's executive branch departments and agencies from discrimination on the basis of sexual orientation or gender identity.

Since 2001, Delaware has imposed additional penalties for committing a violent crime motivated by the victim's actual or perceived sexual orientation. Since 2013, Delaware has imposed additional penalties for committing a violent crime motivated by the victim's actual or perceived gender identity.

=== LGBTQ Commission ===
In January 2025, the Governor signed an executive order to establish the LGBTQ Commission within Delaware.

=== HIV medicine and Prep ===
In June 2021, a law was implemented within Delaware to protect individuals from discrimination based on HIV medicine and Prep.

=== Loophole and outdated provisions ===
In May 2021, a bill passed the Delaware Legislature to repeal a 2009 discovered loophole that found to legally prevented sexual orientation discrimination claims for individuals within need of urgent legal protections and security that say - "based solely on just one exclusive sexual orientation". The bill also repeal a small section of gender identity laws that say - "used for an improper purpose" in an outdated provision within the legislation from 2013. The Governor of Delaware John Carney is yet to either sign or veto the bill.

On the 28th March 2024, a bill (HB275) passed 21-15 vote within the Delaware House of Representatives - to explicitly include “asexuals and pansexuals in the definition of sexual orientation”. The bill awaits an upcoming vote in the Delaware Senate.

== Gender identity and expression ==
Transgender people are allowed to change their legal gender in Delaware, requiring only the signed statement of a licensed medical provider to change the marker on their state-issued identification. As of February 11, 2017, sex reassignment surgery is no longer an explicit requirement to obtain an amended birth certificate. Instead, a signed affidavit from a medical provider is required, stating that there has been "surgical, hormonal, psychological or other treatment appropriate for the individual for the purpose of gender transition."

In 2015, the Delaware General Assembly passed a law to make it easier for inmates to access and/or change the name on their birth certificates to reflect their gender identity. Previously, inmates could only change their names due to religious beliefs. Democratic Governor Jack Markell signed the bill into law on June 25, 2015. The law became effective immediately.

Since March 26, 2016, Delaware has prohibited discrimination based on gender identity within insurance contracts. This includes sex reassignment surgery.

As of April 2020, Delaware does not have gender X available on drivers licenses. The states of New Jersey, Pennsylvania, Virginia, Washington, D.C., and Maryland surrounded by Delaware, all already have gender X available on drivers licenses.

== HIV law reform ==
In April 2017, the Delaware Legislature passed, and Governor John C. Carney Jr. subsequently signed into law, a bill to allow HIV patients to donate to other HIV patients. The law went into effect on January 1, 2018.

== Conversion therapy ==
SB 65, a bill to ban the use of conversion therapy on minors, passed the state Senate by a vote of 12-3 on May 17, 2017, and the state House on June 7, 2018 by a vote of 24-14. The bill was signed into law by the Governor of Delaware, John C. Carney Jr., a month later in July 2018 and went into effect immediately. Conversion therapy has a negative effect on the lives of LGBTQ people, and can lead to low self-esteem, depression and suicide.

== Public opinion ==
In February 2011, a Public Policy Polling survey found that 48% of Delaware voters supported the legalization of same-sex marriage, while 47% were opposed and 5% were not sure. A March 2011 poll by Lake Research Partners showed that 62% in Delaware favored allowing same-sex couples to form civil unions, while 31% were opposed, and 7% were not sure.

A February 2013 poll, conducted by Global Strategy Group, found that 54% of likely voters supported same-sex marriage, 37% were opposed and 8 percent didn't know or declined to answer the question.

A 2017 Public Religion Research Institute (PRRI) poll found that 58% of Delaware residents supported same-sex marriage, while 27% opposed it and 15% were unsure. The same poll also found that 68% of Delawareans supported an anti-discrimination law covering sexual orientation and gender identity, while 21% were opposed. Furthermore, 60% were against allowing businesses to refuse to serve gay and lesbian people due to religious beliefs, while 28% supported allowing such religiously-based refusals.

== Summary table ==
Same-sex sexual activity legal with an equal age of consent set at 16	Yes (Since 1973)
Hate crime laws includes sexual orientation and gender identity	Yes
Anti-discrimination laws in all areas	Yes (Since 2009 for sexual orientation and since 2013 for gender identity)
Same-sex marriages and civil unions available	Yes
Gay panic defense abolished	Yes
Joint and stepchild adoption by same-sex couples	Yes (Since 2012)
Gays, lesbians and bisexuals allowed to serve in the military	Yes (Since 2011)
Transgender people allowed to serve openly in the military	No (Since 2025)
Transvestites allowed to serve openly in the military	No
Intersex people allowed to serve openly in the military	/ Yes (Current DoD policy bans "Hermaphrodites" from serving or enlisting in the military)
Right to change legal gender	Yes
Equal access to both IVF and Surrogacy	Yes
Conversion therapy banned on minors	Yes (Since 2018)
Gender X or third gender recognition	No (Pending)
LGBTQ Commission established	Yes (Since 2025, by an executive order)
MSMs allowed to donate blood	Yes (Since 2023, by the FDA on the condition of being monogamous)

== See also ==
- Politics of Delaware
- LGBT rights in the United States
- Rights and responsibilities of marriages in the United States
- Sarah McBride
