= Sabrina Bruce =

American politician and military officer

- Bruce in 2020

Vice Mayor-Elect of Herndon, Virginia
- Assuming office January 1, 2027
- Succeeding: Clark Hedrick

Personal details
- Party: Democratic
- Education: Colorado State University
- Occupation: Cyber warfare specialist Congressional liaison Campaign manager Politician

Military service
- Branch/service: United States Air Force; United States Space Force
- Years of service: 2013–2019 (Air Force); 2019–2025 (Space Force)
- Rank: Master sergeant
- Battles/wars: Global War on Terrorism

Sabrina Ashlee Bruce is an American politician and retired non-commissioned military officer. She was one of the first enlisted members of the United States Space Force, where she served as a cyber warfare specialist and congressional liaison with the National Reconnaissance Office. She was forced to resign from the Space Force following President Donald Trump's Executive Order 14183, which banned transgender people from military service. In 2026, Bruce was elected to the Herndon, Virginia, town council and, as the candidate who received the largest number of votes, she will become the town's vice mayor upon taking office.

== Early life and education ==
Bruce grew up in South Carolina. She graduated from Landrum High School in Spartanburg County, South Carolina, and studied information technology at Colorado State University.

== Career ==
=== Military ===
Bruce enlisted in the United States Air Force in 2013, when she was twenty-two years old. In 2016, she deployed to Africa, where she served in Djibouti. She was also deployed to the United Kingdom and South Korea. Bruce worked in information technology in the Air Force.

She received three promotions, from senior airman to master sergeant. Bruce served as a cyber warfare specialist and U.S. Congressional liaison.

In 2019, she became one of the first enlisted members of the newly established United States Space Force. Despite the implementation of President Donald Trump's Presidential Memorandum on Military Service by Transgender Individuals in 2019, Bruce was not removed from the military because she had come out as transgender prior to the introduction of the new policy. In 2022, she took an assignment in the National Reconnaissance Office in Chantilly.

Following President Trump's Executive Order 14183, barring transgender people from military service, Bruce was placed on administrative leave before taking a voluntary separation from the Space Force in 2025, meaning she resigned without being subject to a medical investigation.

=== Politics ===
Bruce is a member of the Democratic Party of Virginia. She decided to enter politics after meeting Virginia state senator Danica Roem during a Victory Institute training in Los Angeles in 2025.

In 2026, Bruce was the campaign manager for Colonel Bree Fram's bid for the Virginia's 11th congressional district. Later that year, she ran for a seat on the town council for Herndon, Virginia. Her campaign platforms transit and pedestrian safety, affordable housing, and community engagement.

Bruce won her election to the town council on November 3, 2026, and as the highest vote-getter with 12.8 percent (4,423) of the vote, she is in line to succeed Clark Hedrick as vice mayor. She is the first openly transgender person elected to public office in Fairfax County, Virginia.

== Personal life ==
Bruce is an openly trans woman and began her gender transition, including hormone replacement therapy, in October 2017. In January 2018, she legally changed her name and had her information updated in the military records to reflect her transition.

Bruce is married to a British national. She moved to Herndon, Virginia in 2022.
