= Tomorrow Will Be Different =

Memoir by Sarah McBride

Tomorrow Will Be Different: Love, Loss, and the Fight for Trans Equality
- Cover artist: Rachel Willey
- Language: English
- Publisher: Crown Archetype
- Publication date: March 6, 2018
- Publication place: United States
- Pages: 288
- ISBN: 978-1-5247-6147-9 (Hardcover)
- OCLC: 990111651

Tomorrow Will Be Different: Love, Loss, and the Fight for Trans Equality is a 2018 memoir by Sarah McBride, published by Crown Archetype, an imprint of Penguin Random House.

== Background ==
At the 2016 Democratic National Convention, McBride made a speech that included the phrase "But I believe tomorrow can be different."

== Contents ==
The book is a memoir of McBride, particularly since making national headlines when she came out as transgender to her college while serving as student body president at American University in 2011.

The book foreword is by Joe Biden, former vice president and later president of the United States. The text, in which Biden called transgender equality the "civil rights issue of our time", was widely covered after its advanced release in October 2017.

== Publication and reception ==
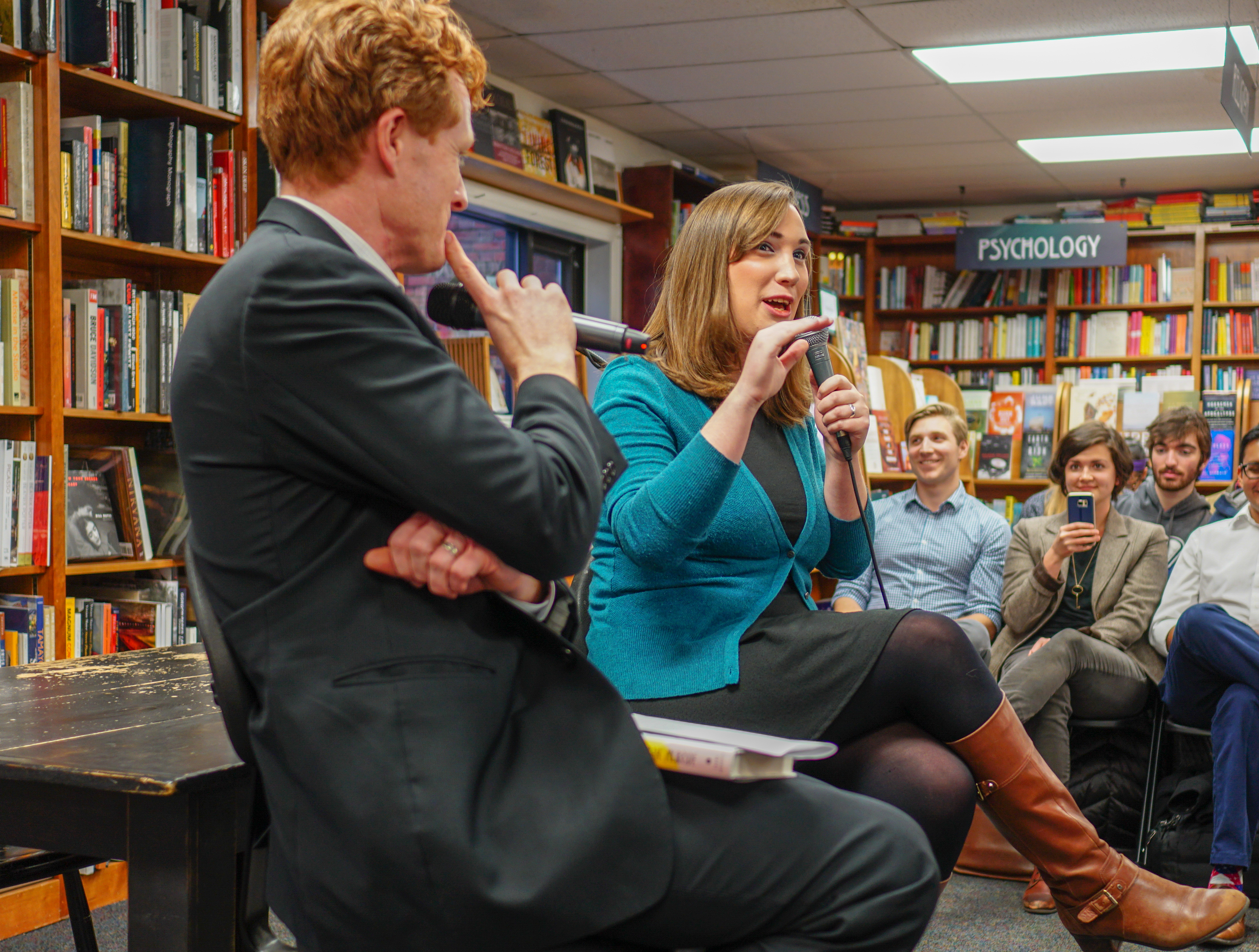
McBride discussing the book at a book store in 2018 alongside Representative Joe Kennedy

McBride narrates the audio book, which runs 9 hours, 18 minutes.

The book received advanced praise from Senator Kamala Harris, Jennifer Finney Boylan, Cecile Richards, and Chad Griffin. It received a starred review from the American Library Association's Booklist.

The book's starred review from magazine Kirkus Reviews says that "throughout, the author ably balances great accomplishments and strong emotions. Reading McBride’s inspiring story will make it harder to ostracize or demonize others with similar stories to share."

Paste named the book as one of the one of 2018's 25 most anticipated books, describing it as "informative, heartbreaking and empowering", and "a must-read, offering encouragement while showing that the fight for equality is just getting started." It was also included on a preview of 2018 queer and feminist books on Autostraddle.
