= Landrum High School =

Public high school in Landrum, South Carolina

Location
- 18818 Asheville Highway; Campobello, South Carolina, U.S. 35.1396°N 82.1638°W

Information
- Founded: 1926
- Principal: J. Kegan Flynn
- Colors: Red and Black
- Mascot: Cardinals
- Website: spart1.org/o/lhs

Landrum High School is a public high school in Spartanburg County, South Carolina.

== History ==
Landrum High School was founded in 1926. It is part of Spartanburg County School District 1.

The first Beta Club chapter was established at Landrum High School on January 8, 1934, by incorporating the fifteen members of the pre-existing Landrum High School Literary Society. The club's sponsor was teacher Helen Prince.

== Notable alumni ==
- Sabrina Bruce, politician and military officer
- Kenny Powers, stuntman
