= Shawn Skelly =

American government official and LGBT activist (born 1966)

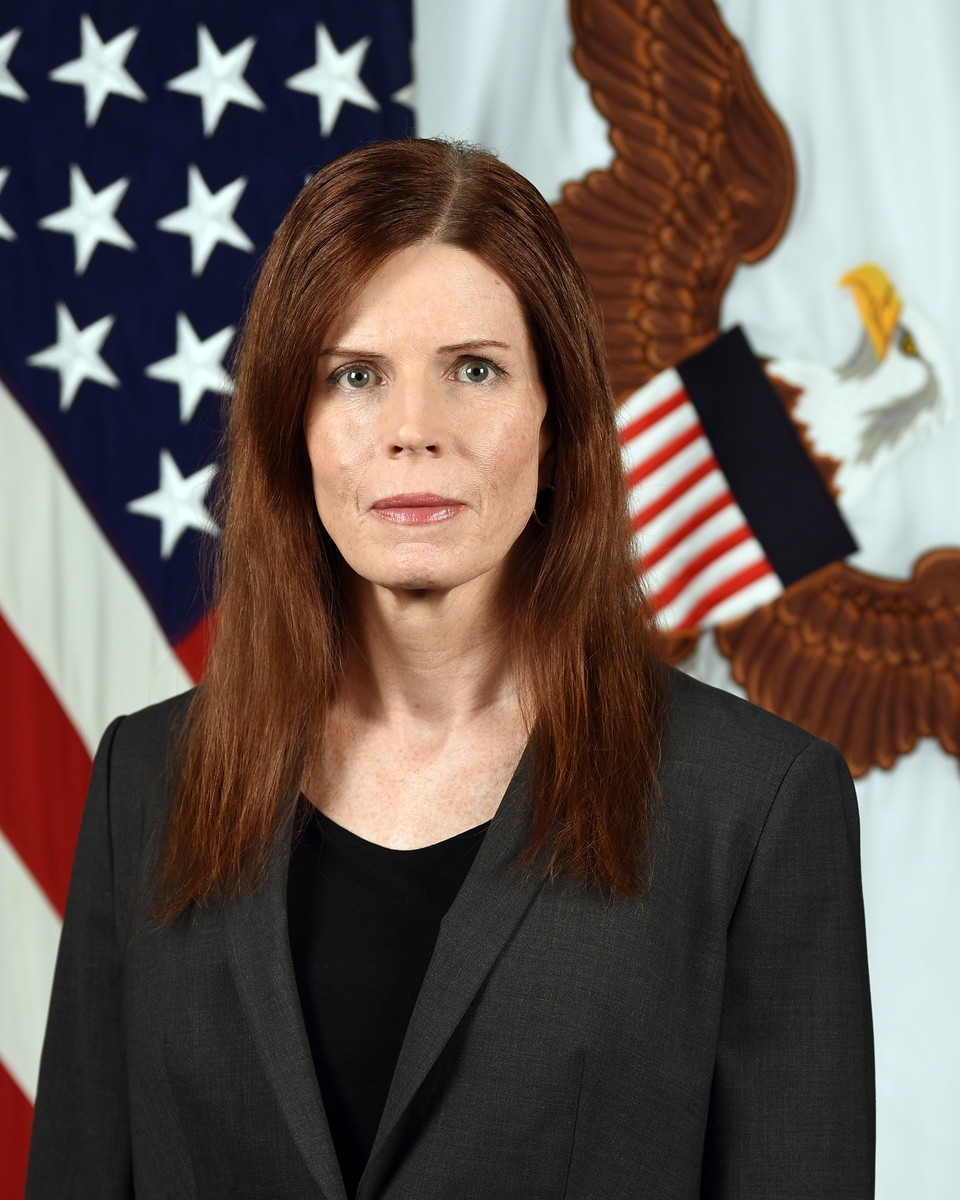

Assistant Secretary of Defense for Readiness
- In office July 22, 2021 – January 20, 2025
- President: Joe Biden
- Preceded by: Veronica Daigle
- Succeeded by: Maurice Todd

Personal details
- Born: 1966 (age 59–60) New York City, New York, U.S.
- Party: Democratic
- Education: University of South Carolina (BA); Naval War College (MA)

Military service
- Allegiance: United States
- Branch/service: United States Navy
- Years of service: 1988–2008
- Rank: Commander
- Shawn Skelly's voice Skelly's opening statement at a House Armed Services Military Personnel Subcommittee hearing on the 2022 National Defense Strategy; Recorded May 18, 2022

Shawn Graham Skelly (born 1966) is an American retired Naval officer, national security expert, and LGBT rights advocate. She served as Assistant Secretary of Defense for Readiness and Force Management during the Biden administration. Skelly also served as acting Deputy Under Secretary of Defense for Personnel and Readiness.

During the administration of President Barack Obama, she served as Director of the Executive Secretariat at the U.S. Department of Transportation, and from 2013 to 2016 as a special assistant to the Undersecretary of Defense for Acquisition, Technology and Logistics. In 2017, she was appointed by Obama to the National Commission on Military, National, and Public Service, making her one of the highest-profile, openly transgender presidential appointees in U.S. history. In 2017, Out Magazine named Skelly to its list of 100 most influential LGBT Americans.

In November 2020, Skelly was appointed to President-elect Joe Biden's transition team for the Department of Defense. In July 2021, Skelly was confirmed as Assistant Secretary of Defense for Readiness by voice vote.

== Early life and education ==
Skelly was born in Brooklyn, New York in 1966. She received a bachelor's degree in history from the University of South Carolina in 1988 and later a master's degree in national security and strategic studies from the U.S. Naval War College.

== Career ==
Skelly began her career in the United States Navy as a Naval Flight Officer. She served on active duty for 20 years, working on a diverse array of combat and management positions for the Navy, ranging from Southeast and Oceania policy to global counter-terrorism operations, to serving at the Marine Corps's Warfighting Laboratory in Quantico, Virginia. She flew in S-3B Viking carrier-based anti-submarine and aerial refueling aircraft, trained Naval Flight Officers, and served in a variety of leadership roles at sea. From 2003 to 2006, she was the U.S. Pacific Command's Deputy Chief of Staff for South Asia, Southeast Asia and Oceana Policy.

In her last assignment before retiring as a Commander in 2008, Skelly directed the department-wide anti-IED program for the Marine Corps.

In 2017, Skelly was appointed by President Barack Obama to serve on the congressionally mandated National Commission on Military, National, and Public Service, an 11-member bipartisan commission tasked by Congress in 2017 to review the Selective Service System, along with the military, national, and public service.

In July 2021, Skelly was confirmed as Assistant Secretary of Defense for Readiness.

== Advocacy work ==
In 2018, Skelly co-founded Out in National Security, a non-profit organization dedicated to increasing opportunities and representation of the LGBT community within the national security and international affairs industry.

In response to President Trump's ban on transgender service members serving openly in the military, Skelly spoke at a rally in New York City protesting the ban, telling media, “[The ban] is the most prominent part of a broader administration campaign to drive transgender people out of the mainstream of American society through the deliberate removal of legal recognition and protections of every sort.” In January 2026, Shaw spoke at a retirement ceremony for transgender service members of the United States Armed Forces, Colonel Bree Fram, Lieutenant Colonel Erin Krizek, Commander Blake Dremann, Sergeant First Class Cathrine Schmid, and Chief Petty Officer Jaida McGuire, following their forced retirement due to the ban.
