= Elgin V. Kuykendall =

American politician, lawyer, and judge

Elgin V. Kuykendall was first elected to the Washington State Senate in November 1916.

Elgin Victor Kuykendall (1870–1958) was an American lawyer, judge, and politician in the state of Washington in the United States. For several years the chairman of the state committee of the Republican Party of Washington, Kuykendall was first elected to the Washington State Senate in November 1916 and re-elected to a second term two years later. Kuykendall was appointed a judge of the Washington State Superior court in December 1924 and remained in that capacity until his retirement in December 1949. In his twilight years Kuykendall also pursued the avocation of regional historian, ultimately publishing two works on the history of Southeastern Washington state as well as his memoirs.

== Biography ==
=== Early years ===
Elgin Victor Kuykendall was born in Oakland, Oregon, on October 8, 1870. His father, G.B. Kuykendall, was a prominent physician in the Southeastern Washington town of Pomeroy, Washington. It was in that region of the state that Kuykendall grew up, attending the public schools of rural Garfield County.

Following completion of his secondary education, Kuykendall briefly worked as a schoolteacher. He decided to pursue a career in jurisprudence in 1892, taking up the study of law under Pomeroy attorney Samuel G. Cosgrove, a man who would later become the sixth Governor of Washington. Kuykendall passed the Washington state bar exam in 1894 but did not immediately begin legal practice, instead running for election and winning the post of Superintendent of Schools in that same year. He would ultimately serve one term in that capacity. He also served for six months as principal of Pomeroy High School.

Kuykendall married Marguerite Scully, the daughter of an Asotin County, Washington, pioneer, in 1896. The couple would raise four children together.

=== Career ===
In 1897, Kuykendall left pedagogy behind and began his career in the legal profession, opening a private practice. He remained politically oriented, however, and in 1898 he ran for and won the post of Garfield County Prosecutor. The 28-year-old would again serve but one term in this second elected position before moving on. Kuykendall also maintained a private practice in addition to his prosecutorial role, ultimately joining into partnership with local judge Mack F. Gose to establish the firm Gose & Kuykendall in February 1898.

In the next election, that of 1900, Kuykendall set his sights on the position of Mayor of the small town of Pomeroy. This third race was again met with success, and Kuykendall served yet another two-year stint in office. All the while Kuykendall continued to build his legal practice, his relationship with Gose coming to an end only in 1909 when the latter was appointed to the Washington Supreme Court.

Following Gose's appointment to the bench in Olympia, Kuykendall practiced law on his own for a two-year period before forming another partnership in 1911 as Kuykendall & McCabe.

A staunch member of the Republican Party, Kuykendall served multiple terms as chairman of the Washington Republican State Committee during the decade of the 1910s.

Kuykendall's finale electoral foray came in November 1916, when he was elected as a Republican member of the Washington State Senate. Unlike his previous electoral endeavors, Kuykendall would run for re-election in November 1918, continuing his undefeated record and gaining a second stint in the statehouse for the 1919 legislative session.

In 1919, Washington Governor Louis F. Hart appointed Kuykendall to the Washington Public Service Commission. He remained at that post for five years.

On December 1, 1924, Chester M. Miller, Superior Court Judge for Asotin, Columbia, and Garfield counties died and Kuykendall was appointed by Governor Hart as his successor. Kuykendall would remain in that position for the rest of his working life.

=== Fraternal affiliations ===
Kuykendall was an active member of the Methodist Church. He was also closely involved in the affairs of the Knights of Pythias as a member of the state's judiciary committee and was a member of the fraternal benefit society Woodmen of the World.

=== Later years ===
Kuykendall retired from the Superior Court bench on December 31, 1949, having served as a judge for 25 years.

During his final years Kuykendall turned to the writing of his memoirs and to researching and publishing works of local history. Two of Kuykendall's books were published in 1954 with a third published only in 1984, more than a quarter century after his death.

=== Death and legacy ===
Elgin V. Kuykendall died in Pomeroy, Washington on February 25, 1958. He was 87 years old at the time of his death.

Elgin Kuykendall's papers are housed in the Manuscripts, Archives, and Special Collections section of Terrell Library at Washington State University in Pullman, Washington. The collection consists of approximately 8,000 documents and includes business documents, judicial papers, political speeches and historical writings, and correspondence. The collection is open for the use of researchers and an online guide to the material is available.

== Works ==
- Explanation of the Operation of the Washington Department of Public Works, Formerly the Public Service Commission of Washington. Olympia: c. 1921.
- Historic Glimpses of Asotin County, Washington. Clarkston, WA: Clarkston Herald, 1954.
- Eighty Years in the Changing West: Memoirs of E.V. Kuykendall. n.c.: n.p., 1954.
- History of Garfield County. With Dan Walsh. Fairfield, WA: Ye Galleon Press, 1984. —Posthumously published.
