= Oakland, Oregon =

- City
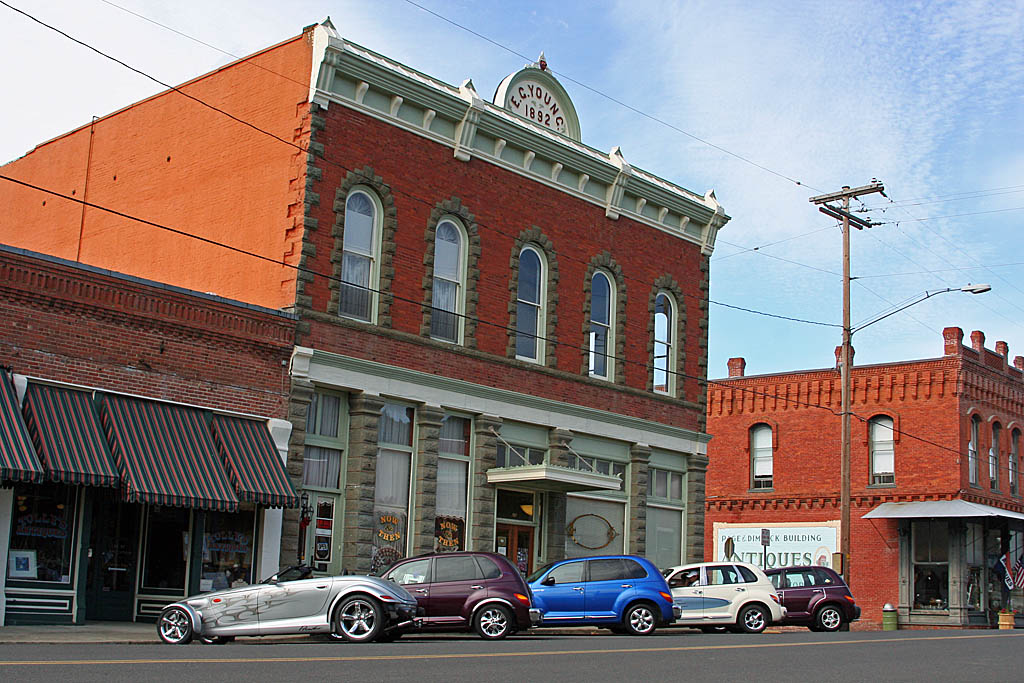
- Downtown Oakland and cars of the local PT Cruiser Club

- Location in Oregon
- Coordinates: 43°25′24″N 123°17′49″W
- Country: United States
- State: Oregon
- County: Douglas
- Incorporated: 1878

Government
  - Mayor: Bette Keehley

Area
  - Total: 0.73 sq mi (1.89 km^{2})
  - Land: 0.73 sq mi (1.89 km^{2})
  - Water: 0 sq mi (0.00 km^{2})
- Elevation: 456 ft (139 m)

Population (2020)
  - Total: 934
  - Density: 1,278.6/sq mi (493.67/km^{2})
- Time zone: UTC-8 (Pacific)
  - Summer (DST): UTC-7 (Pacific)
- ZIP Code: 97462
- Area code: 541
- FIPS code: 41-54000
- GNIS feature ID: 2411293
- Website: www.oaklandoregon.org

Oakland is a city in Douglas County, Oregon, United States, located 2 miles (3 km) from Interstate 5. The population was 934 at the 2020 census.

== History ==
Oakland was the first city to be placed on the state's historic register, in May 1968. The city's two-block business district consists of the original brick buildings built in the 1880s and 1890s. Stearns Hardware has been in operation since 1887, which has occupied the Stearns Hardware Building since it was built in 1891. Over 80 properties in the city were constructed between 1852 and 1890. The Oakland Historic District was listed on the National Register of Historic Places in March 1979.

Several films have been shot in Oakland, including Fire in the Sky, Didi's Last Wish, and Grand Tour: Disaster in Time. A home in Oakland was featured in a 2021 episode of The Dead Files, in which the show's crew investigated allegations of unwanted paranormal activity reported by the residents.

== Geography ==
According to the United States Census Bureau, the city has a total area of 0.73 square miles (1.89 km^{2}), all of it land. Calapooya Creek, a tributary of the Umpqua River, flows by Oakland.

=== Climate ===
This region experiences warm (but not hot) and dry summers, with no average monthly temperatures above 71.6 °F (22.0 °C). According to the Köppen Climate Classification system, Oakland has a warm-summer Mediterranean climate, abbreviated Csb on climate maps.

== Demographics ==
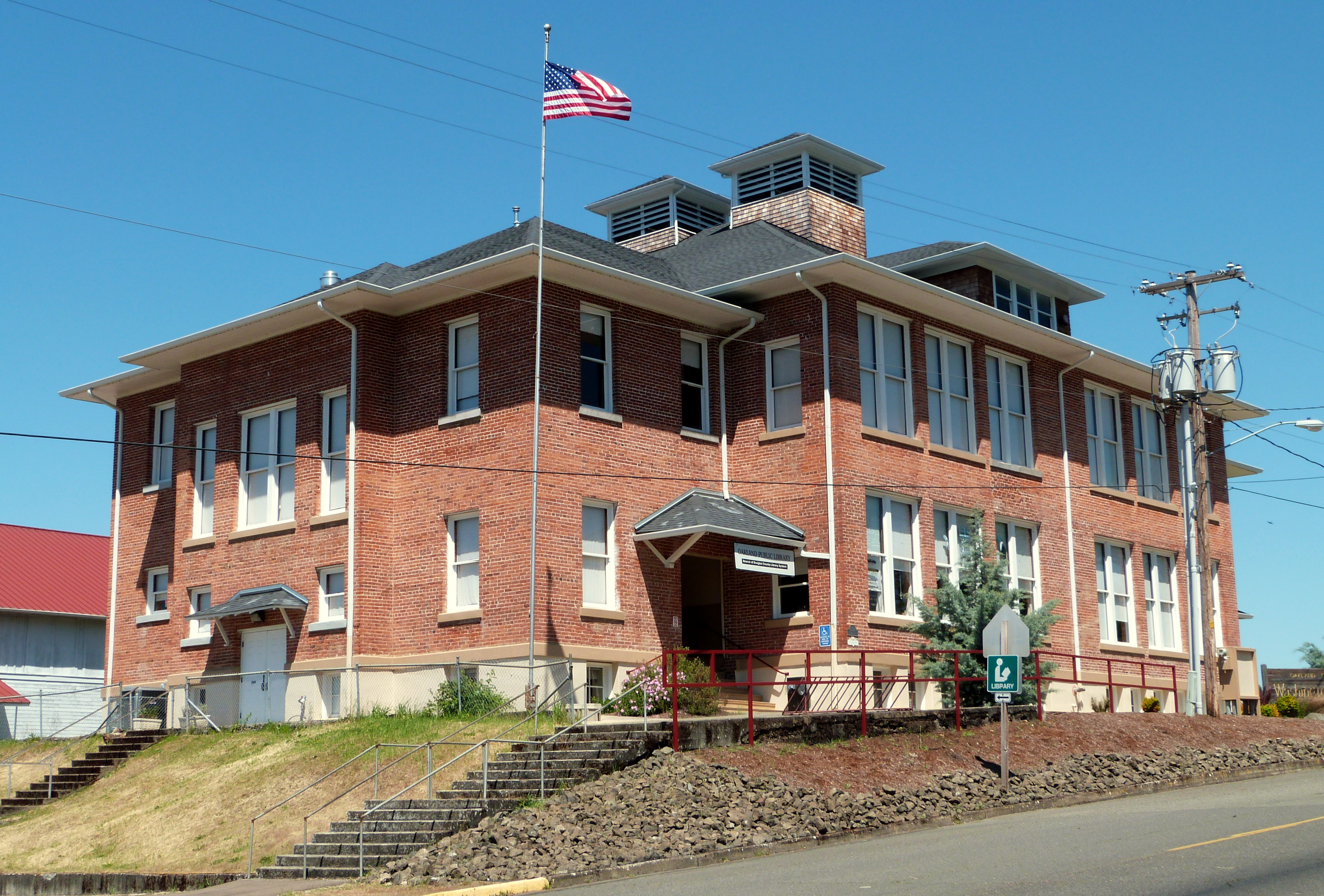
City hall and library

Historical population
Census	Pop.	Note	%±
1880	369		—
1890	339		−8.1%
1900	368		8.6%
1910	467		26.9%
1920	516		10.5%
1930	421		−18.4%
1940	367		−12.8%
1950	829		125.9%
1960	856		3.3%
1970	1,010		18.0%
1980	886		−12.3%
1990	844		−4.7%
2000	954		13.0%
2010	927		−2.8%
2020	934		0.8%
U.S. Decennial Census

=== 2020 census ===
As of the 2020 census, Oakland had a population of 934. The median age was 42.6 years. 21.1% of residents were under the age of 18 and 24.2% of residents were 65 years of age or older. For every 100 females there were 90.2 males, and for every 100 females age 18 and over there were 89.0 males age 18 and over.

95.1% of residents lived in urban areas, while 4.9% lived in rural areas.

There were 366 households in Oakland, of which 27.6% had children under the age of 18 living in them. Of all households, 48.4% were married-couple households, 18.9% were households with a male householder and no spouse or partner present, and 24.9% were households with a female householder and no spouse or partner present. About 25.5% of all households were made up of individuals and 12.6% had someone living alone who was 65 years of age or older.

There were 413 housing units, of which 11.4% were vacant. Among occupied housing units, 71.6% were owner-occupied and 28.4% were renter-occupied. The homeowner vacancy rate was 1.8% and the rental vacancy rate was 10.7%.

Racial composition as of the 2020 census
Race	Number	Percent
White	809	86.6%
Black or African American	2	0.2%
American Indian and Alaska Native	14	1.5%
Asian	6	0.6%
Native Hawaiian and Other Pacific Islander	0	0%
Some other race	24	2.6%
Two or more races	79	8.5%
Hispanic or Latino (of any race)	70	7.5%

=== 2010 census ===
As of the census of 2010, there were 927 people, 380 households, and 256 families living in the city. The population density was 1,269.9 inhabitants per square mile (490.3/km^{2}). There were 412 housing units at an average density of 564.4 per square mile (217.9/km^{2}). The racial makeup of the city was 94.2% White, 0.1% African American, 1.4% Native American, 0.3% Asian, 1.2% from other races, and 2.8% from two or more races. Hispanic or Latino of any race were 3.0% of the population.

There were 380 households, of which 31.8% had children under the age of 18 living with them, 46.1% were married couples living together, 13.4% had a female householder with no husband present, 7.9% had a male householder with no wife present, and 32.6% were non-families. 25.3% of all households were made up of individuals, and 10% had someone living alone who was 65 years of age or older. The average household size was 2.44 and the average family size was 2.89.

The median age in the city was 40.8 years. 23.6% of residents were under the age of 18; 9% were between the ages of 18 and 24; 21.9% were from 25 to 44; 31.2% were from 45 to 64; and 14.1% were 65 years of age or older. The gender makeup of the city was 50.2% male and 49.8% female.

=== 2000 census ===
As of the census of 2000, there were 954 people, 377 households, and 257 families living in the city. The population density was 1,340.8 inhabitants per square mile (517.7/km^{2}). There were 404 housing units at an average density of 567.8 per square mile (219.2/km^{2}). The racial makeup of the city was 93.82% White, 0.21% African American, 1.99% Native American, 0.10% Asian, 0.21% Pacific Islander, 0.10% from other races, and 3.56% from two or more races. 3.35% of the population were Hispanic or Latino of any race.

There were 377 households, out of which 34.0% had children under the age of 18 living with them, 55.7% were married couples living together, 9.5% had a female householder with no husband present, and 31.8% were non-families. 23.3% of all households were made up of individuals, and 9.0% had someone living alone who was 65 years of age or older. The average household size was 2.53 and the average family size was 3.06.

In the city, the population was spread out, with 26.5% under the age of 18, 8.0% from 18 to 24, 24.4% from 25 to 44, 26.0% from 45 to 64, and 15.1% who were 65 years of age or older. The median age was 40 years. For every 100 females, there were 97.1 males. For every 100 females age 18 and over, there were 98.0 males.

The median income for a household in the city was $29,479, and the median income for a family was $35,795. Males had a median income of $27,917 versus $19,554 for females. The per capita income for the city was $14,867. 15.0% of the population and 10.1% of families were below the poverty line. Out of the total population, 22.1% of those under the age of 18 and 6.1% of those 65 and older were living below the poverty line.

== Notable people ==
- Elgin V. Kuykendall (1870–1958), lawyer, judge, and Washington State Senator was born in Oakland.
- Major General Tammy Smith (born 1963) deputy commanding general-sustainment for the 8th Army. Winner of Bronze Star and Legion of Merit.
