= HIV Organ Policy Equity Act =

US law

- Long title: To amend the Public Health Service Act to establish safeguards and standards of quality for research and transplantation of organs infected with human immunodeficiency virus (HIV).
- Nicknames: HOPE Act
- Announced in: the 113th United States Congress
- Sponsored by: Sen. Barbara Boxer (D, CA)
- Number of co-sponsors: 15

Citations
- Public law: PL 113-51

Codification
- Acts affected: Public Health Service Act
- U.S.C. sections affected: 18 U.S.C. § 1122, 42 U.S.C. § 274, 42 U.S.C. § 273, 42 U.S.C. § 273 et seq.
- Agencies affected: Department of Health and Human Services

Legislative history
- Introduced in the Senate as S. 330 by Sen. Barbara Boxer (D, CA) on February 14, 2013; Committee consideration by United States Senate Committee on Health, Education, Labor, and Pensions, United States House Committee on Energy and Commerce, United States House Energy Subcommittee on Health, United States House Committee on the Judiciary, United States House Judiciary Subcommittee on Crime, Terrorism, Homeland Security and Investigations; Passed the Senate on June 17, 2013 (Unanimous consent)

The HIV Organ Policy Equity Act (the HOPE Act) is a law that modifies rules regarding organ donation between HIV-positive individuals. The law authorizes clinical research and the revision of rules about organ donation and transportation as a result of the research. Organs from HIV donors would only be going to individuals who are already HIV positive, but could lead to 600 additional organ transplants a year. The use of HIV-positive organs was previously a federal crime. This bill passed the United States Senate during the 113th United States Congress, and also passed the United States House of Representatives. It was signed into law as PL 113-51 by President Barack Obama on November 21, 2013.

The HIV Organ Policy Equity Act revised the Organ Transplant Amendments Act of 1988, a law that prevented patients from receiving organs from HIV positive people. The HIV Organ Policy Equity Act shortened organ transplant wait times, including the wait times for people without HIV as more HIV positive patients receive organs.

== Provisions of the bill ==
This summary is based largely on the summary provided by the Congressional Research Service, a public domain source.

The HIV Organ Policy Equity Act amends the Public Health Service Act to repeal the requirement that the Organ Procurement and Transplantation Network adopt and use standards of quality for the acquisition and transportation of donated organs that include standards for preventing the acquisition of organs infected with the etiologic agent for acquired immune deficiency syndrome (AIDS).

The bill replaces this requirement with authorization for the Organ Procurement and Transplantation Network to adopt and use such standards with respect to organs infected with human immunodeficiency virus (HIV), provided that any such standards ensure that organs infected with HIV may be transplanted only into individuals who are: (1) infected with such virus before receiving such an organ; and (2) participating in clinical research approved by an institutional review board under the criteria, standards, and regulations regarding organs infected with HIV developed under this Act or, if participation in such research is no longer warranted, receiving a transplant under such standards and regulations.

The bill would revise similarly the requirement that organ procurement organizations arrange for testing to prevent the acquisition of organs infected with the AIDS etiologic agent to require that they arrange for testing to identify organs infected with HIV.

The bill directs the secretary of health and human services (HHS) to develop and publish guidelines for the conduct of research relating to transplantation of organs from HIV-infected donors.

The bill also requires the Organ Procurement and Transplantation Network to revise its standards of quality regarding HIV-infected organs and the secretary to revise related regulations.

The bill requires the secretary to: (1) review annually the results of scientific research in conjunction with the Organ Procurement and Transplantation Network to determine whether they warrant revision of quality standards relating to donated HIV-infected organs and to the safety of transplantation of organs with a particular strain of HIV into a recipient with a different strain; and (2) direct the Organ Procurement and Transplantation Network, if the review so warrants, to revise its standards in a way that ensures the changes will not reduce the safety of organ transplantation.

Finally, the bill amends the federal criminal code to declare that an organ donation does not violate the prohibition against a knowing organ donation by an HIV-infected individual if the donation is made in accordance with this act.

== Congressional Budget Office report ==
This summary is based largely on the summary provided by the Congressional Budget Office, as ordered reported by the Senate Committee on Health, Education, Labor, and Pensions on March 20, 2013. This is a public domain source.

S. 330 amends provisions of the Public Health Service Act that authorize the Secretary of the Department of Health and Human Services (HHS) to establish guidelines and quality standards for conducting research relating to donated organs and for acquiring and procuring such organs.

The bill removes a provision in current law that prohibits the acquisition and procurement of donated organs that are infected with the virus that causes acquired immune deficiency syndrome. S. 330 also requires the Secretary of HHS to develop guidelines for conducting research relating to organ transplants from donors who are infected with the human immunodeficiency virus (HIV). The Secretary is required to annually review the results of the research to determine whether the results warrant revising the quality standards for acquiring and procuring donated organs. Finally, the bill authorizes the Secretary to establish standards for acquiring and procuring donated organs that are infected with HIV, provided that any such standards ensure that an organ infected with HIV may be transplanted only into individuals who are infected with HIV before receiving such organ.

To implement S. 330, the Congressional Budget Office (CBO) estimated that HHS would incur administrative costs of less than $500,000 annually and about $1 million over the 2014-2018 period. Any such costs would be subject to the availability of appropriated funds. Pay-as-you-go procedures do not apply to this legislation because it would not affect direct spending or revenues.

The bill contains no intergovernmental or private-sector mandates as defined in the Unfunded Mandates Reform Act.

== Procedural history ==
The HIV Organ Policy Equity Act was introduced into the Senate on February 14, 2013 by Sen. Barbara Boxer (D, CA). It was referred to the United States Senate Committee on Health, Education, Labor, and Pensions. On June 17, 2013, the Senate voted by unanimous consent to pass the bill.

The HIV Organ Policy Equity Act was received in the United States House of Representatives on June 18, 2013. It was referred to the United States House Committee on Energy and Commerce, the United States House Energy Subcommittee on Health, the United States House Committee on the Judiciary, and the United States House Judiciary Subcommittee on Crime, Terrorism, Homeland Security and Investigations. On November 8, 2013, House Majority Leader Eric Cantor announced that the HIV Organ Policy Equity Act would be considered under a suspension of the rules on the House floor on November 12, 2013.

== Debate and discussion ==
The Human Rights Campaign was in favor of the bill. According to the Human Rights Campaign, "the Act is supported by dozens of organizations that advocate on transplant policy and communities with an increased need for transplantation, including: AIDS United, amfAR, American Medical Association, American Society for Nephrology, Association of Organ Procurement Organizations, American Society of Transplantation, American Society of Transplant Surgeons, Dialysis Patient Citizens, HIV Medicine Association, and United Network for Organ Sharing (UNOS)."

== See also ==
- List of bills in the 113th United States Congress
- United Network for Organ Sharing
- Organ donation
- HIV/AIDS
