= LGBTQ healthcare in the United States Veterans Health Administration =

The United States Veterans Health Administration (VHA) has an LGBTQ+ Program through the Office of Patient Care Services. The “+” sign captures identities beyond LGBTQ, including but not limited to questioning, pansexual, asexual, agender, gender diverse, nonbinary, gender-neutral, and other identities. VHA began collecting data on veteran’s sexual orientation and gender identity in 2022 to inform policy and improve clinical care. There are estimated to be more than one million LGBTQ+ Americans who are military veterans. If LGBTQ+ veterans use VHA at the same rate as non-LGBTQ+ veterans, there could be more than 250,000 LGBTQ+ veterans served by VHA. Using diagnostic codes in medical record data, Blosnich and colleagues found that the prevalence of transgender veterans in VHA (22.9/100,000) is five times higher than reported prevalence of transgender-related diagnoses in the general population (4.3/100,000). Brown and Jones identified 5,135 transgender veterans receiving care in VHA using a broader set of diagnostic codes. Brown also notes that this methodology fails to identify transgender veterans who have not disclosed their gender identity to providers, those who don’t meet criteria for a diagnosis, or veterans who get their transition-related care outside of the VHA.

== History ==
In 2011, the Department of Defense repealed its Don’t Ask, Don’t Tell policy, allowing openly gay, lesbian and bisexual military personnel to serve in the armed forces. However, ending Don’t Ask, Don’t Tell did not change the military’s policy toward transgender people who continued to be banned from military service. Department of Defense’s policy on transgender service has fluctuated over the years, but as of 2023 there are no restrictions on transgender individuals’ military service. Although VHA, as a separate entity from Department of Defense, did not ever exclude LGBTQ+ veterans from accessing VHA resources, the repeal of Don’t Ask, Don’t Tell and the transgender military ban was expected to increase the numbers of LGB military personnel and consequently increase the number of LGB veterans who seek care at the VHA after service.

== Concerns from LGBTQ+ veterans ==
Some researchers have raised concerns that LGBTQ+ veterans may not feel welcome at the VHA. Sherman and coauthors found that 24% of a sample of 58 LGBT veterans had not disclosed their sexual orientation to any VHA provider. The researchers noted that LGBT veterans may be uncomfortable disclosing their sexual orientation or gender identity because when they were in the military this information could lead to their discharge from service. Although VHA never had a policy prohibiting care to LGBTQ+ veterans, former military personnel often associate military policy with VHA policy. Sherman and colleagues also found that some LGBTQ+ veterans worried that disclosing their sexual or gender minority status would lead to losing VA medical benefits, even though there is a Patient’s Rights and Responsibilities Policy that prevents this type of discrimination.

In the same study, Sherman and colleagues examined attitudes and practices of 202 VHA providers at two mid-western hospitals and found that only half of providers had asked their patients about sexual orientation in the past year, despite it being relevant to health care. Mental health providers were more likely to ask patients about sexual orientation than medical providers, perhaps due to an awareness of the stress associated with being a member of a minority group. Less than half of the VHA providers overall (43%) had received any kind of training in LGBTQ+ health issues since they began practicing.

A later study by Kauth and colleagues found improvements in some areas related to LGBTQ+ veterans’ experiences with VHA care. For example, nearly two-thirds of a sample of LGBTQ+ veterans rated their primary care and mental health care providers at VHA as “somewhat” or “very welcoming.” Similarly, 64% of LGBTQ+ veterans endorsed feeling “somewhat” or “very comfortable” disclosing their sexual orientation to their VHA providers, and 67.5% of transgender participants reported feeling comfortable disclosing their gender identity. Similarly, the respondents who reported being comfortable with such disclosure also reported greater satisfaction with their healthcare.

== Responses from the Veterans' Health Administration ==
The Veterans Health Administration (VHA) is working to be a national leader in health care for LGBTQ+ Veterans and assure that high-quality care is provided in a person-centered, respectful environment. To address the healthcare needs of LGBTQ+ veterans and create a more welcoming environment at VHA facilities, as well as increase the competency of providers, VHA has taken several actions, starting with several policy changes. For example, patient and Department of Veterans Affairs (VA) employee non-discrimination policies now include protections for sexual orientation, gender identity and expression and also have an inclusive definition of family. A policy on the rights of veterans’ family members includes a broad definition of “family” that allows LGBTQ+ veterans to decide who is regarded as part of their family. VHA also issued a national transgender healthcare policy in 2011 (now VHA Directive 1341) and began training providers on transgender care. VHA has a separate healthcare policy on LGBQ health care (VHA Directive 1340).

In 2011, VHA established the Office of Health Equity to work at a systems level to reduce health disparities in a number of vulnerable populations, including LGBTQ+ veterans, by raising awareness and advocating for healthcare system changes. One important activity by the Office of Health Equity has been their championing of VA facility participation in the Human Rights Campaign Healthcare Equality Index survey. In the most recent survey, 115 of 171 VA facilities participated in the HEI.

The VHA has also established the LGBTQ+ Health Program within the Office of Patient Care Services. The LGBTQ+ Health Program supports an internal SharePoint website which hosts archived staff trainings, links to policies, links to professional society guidelines, journal articles, facility information about LGBTQ+ support groups, patient education materials, and LGBTQ+ awareness campaign materials. The LGBTQ+ Health Program also worked with subject-matter experts to create a series of educational trainings and webinars on LGBTQ+ Veteran health, which are available internally and publicly through VHA TRAIN, a free service of the Public Health Foundation, and VA eHealth University.

There is an LGBTQ+ Veteran Care Coordinator (LGBTQ+ VCC) at every facility to help veterans get the care they need. The LGBTQ+ VCC can answer questions, advocate for the right to quality care, handle complaints or concerns veterans have about your care, and help veterans get started with services for LGBTQ+ Veterans. Contact the LGBTQ+ VCC at your nearest facility.

The LGBTQ+ Health Program also worked to develop clinical support for VHA providers. E-consultation on transgender care is available to any VHA provider at any facility through the veteran’s electronic health record.. Providers asking a question get a case-specific response from an interdisciplinary team of experienced clinicians. The national e-consultation program began in 2014 and became completely national in spring 2015.

Another training program consists of nine interprofessional postdoctoral psychology fellowships in LGBTQ+ health sponsored by the VHA Office of Academic Affiliations and Mental Health Services. The LGBTQ+ Health Program advises these nine fellowship sites, which include VA medical centers at Bedford, MA; Boston, MA; Chicago, IL; Honolulu, HI; Houston, TX; Milwaukee, WI; San Diego, CA; San Francisco, CA; and West Haven, CT. Fellows provide direct clinical services to LGBTQ+ veterans in a variety of clinical settings, as well as train staff and outreach to LGBTQ+ community agencies.

In addition to responding to the needs of LGBTQ+ Veterans, the VHA Office of Diversity and Inclusion (ODI) has taken steps to foster a supportive environment for LGBTQ+ employees. Employees enjoy the same discrimination protections as patients, including protections for sexual orientation and gender identity. For example, the Office of Personnel Management (OPM) offers protections to transgender VA employees, including access to sanitary facilities, use of preferred name and pronouns in employee files, and avenues through which to report workplace discrimination, as well as healthcare coverage for transition related care. Protections are in place for both sexual orientation and gender minority federal employees. ODI has established an LGBTQ+ Special Emphasis Program (SEP), which works to ensure that there is equal opportunity for LGBTQ+ employees to work at VHA facilities. One goal of the SEP is to establish a manager at each VHA facility who serves as the facility expert on LGBT policy and leads the staff in creating a welcoming environment to LGBTQ+ employees through educational activities and cultural competency trainings.

In March 2024, it was announced that IVF treatment will also cover single individuals and same-sex couples within the US Military - not just for heterosexual couples.

== See also ==
- LGBT healthcare in prison
