= LGBTQ culture =

Common culture shared by lesbian, gay, bisexual, transgender and queer people

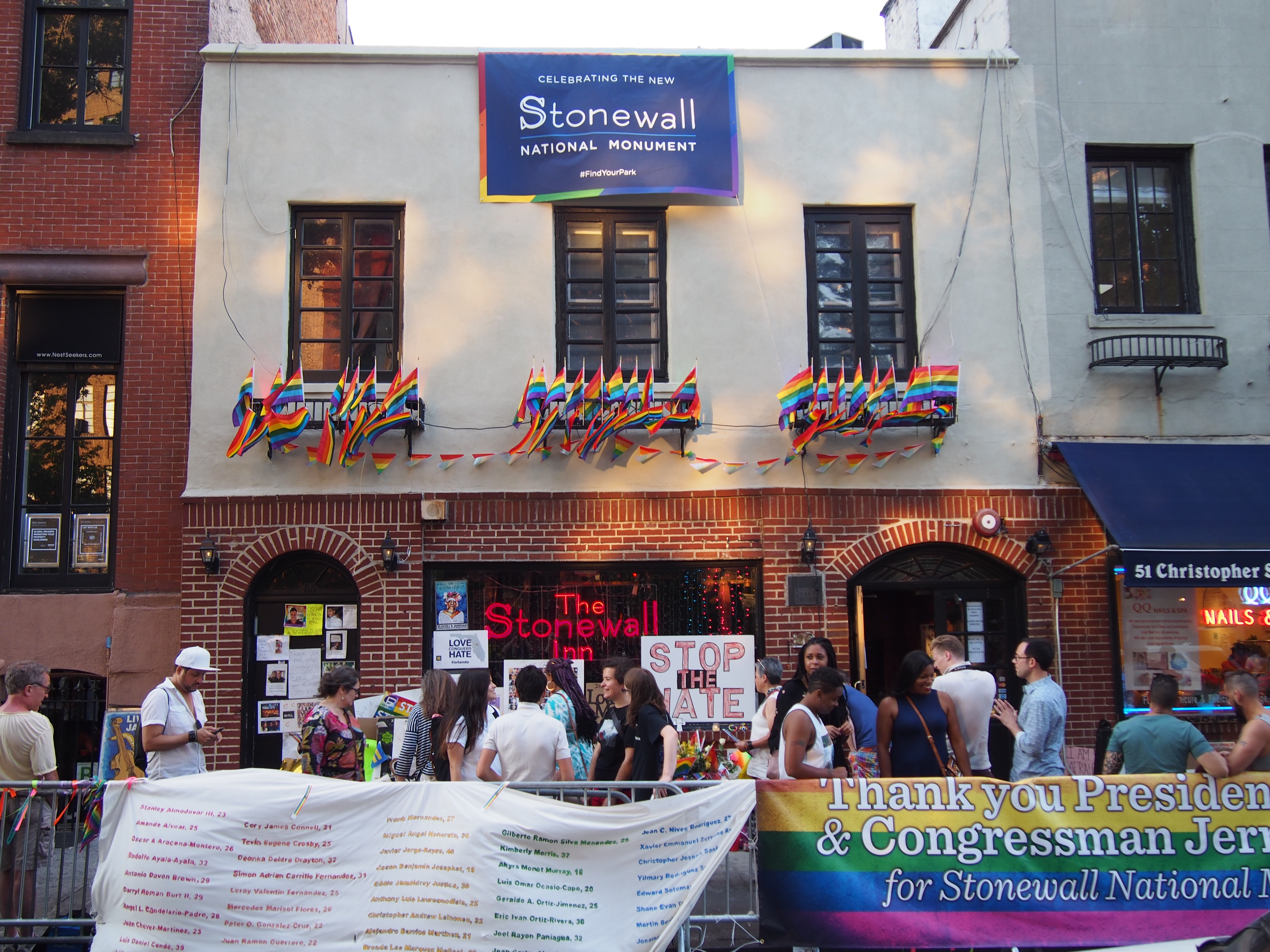
Greenwich Village, a gay neighborhood in Manhattan, is home to the Stonewall Inn, shown here adorned with rainbow pride flags.

LGBTQ culture or queer culture is the shared culture, experiences, values, and expressions of LGBTQ people, including lesbian, gay, bisexual, transgender, and queer individuals. It may be referred to by other variants (Note: Other variants include: LGBT, LGBT+, LGBTQ+, LGBTQIA, LGBTQIA+, 2SLGBTQ, 2SLGBTQ+, GLBT, GLBTQ, LGBTQQ, LGBTI, LGBTI+) of the initialism LGBTQ, while the term gay culture can refer either to LGBTQ culture in general or specifically to homosexual culture.

LGBTQ culture varies widely by geography and the identity of the participants. Elements common to cultures of lesbian, gay, bisexual, transgender, and intersex people include:

- Works by famous gay, lesbian, bisexual, transgender and queer people, including:
  - Contemporary LGBTQ artists and political figures like Larry Kramer, Keith Haring and Rosa von Praunheim.
  - Historical figures identified as LGBTQ, although identifying historical figures with modern terms for sexual identity is controversial (see History of sexuality). However, many LGBTQ people feel a kinship with these people and their work (particularly that addressing same-sex attraction or gender identity); an example is VictoryFund.org, dedicated to supporting homosexual politicians.
- An understanding of LGBTQ social movements
- Figures and identities present in the LGBTQ community; within LGBTQ communities in Western culture, this might include drag kings and drag queens, pride parades and the rainbow flag.
- LGBTQ communities may organize themselves into, or support, movements for civil rights promoting LGBTQ rights in various places around the world.

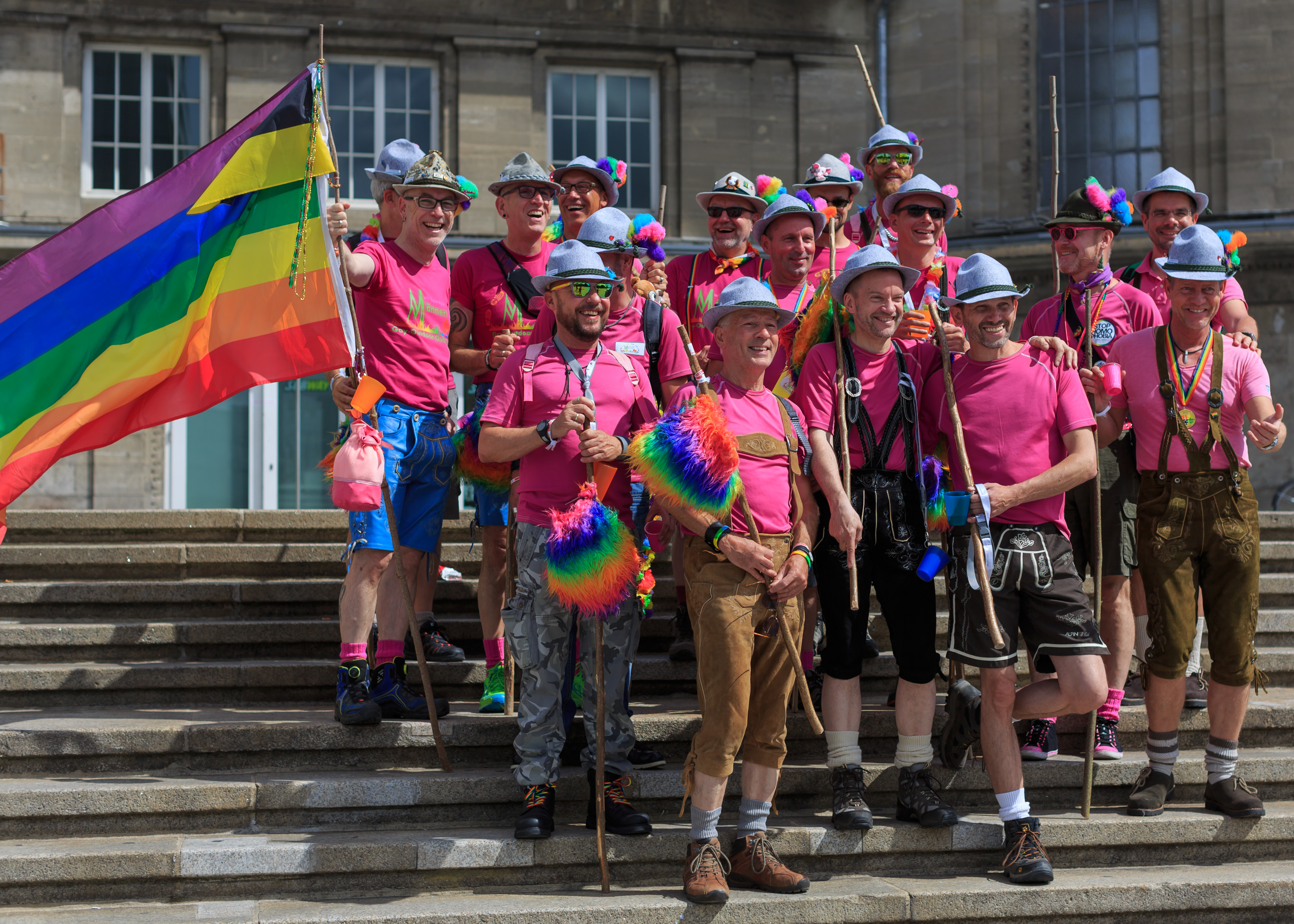
Cologne Germany Gay Pride Parade (2014)

Not all LGBTQ people identify with LGBTQ culture; this may be due to geographic distance, unawareness of the subculture's existence, fear of social stigma or a preference for remaining unidentified with sexuality- or gender-based subcultures or communities. The Queercore and Gay Shame movements critique what they see as the commercialization and self-imposed "ghettoization" of LGBTQ culture.

In some cities, particularly in North America, some LGBTQ people live in neighborhoods with a high proportion of gay residents, otherwise known as gay villages or gayborhoods—examples of these neighborhoods include Greenwich Village, Hell's Kitchen, and Chelsea in Manhattan; Castro and West Hollywood in California, United States; Le Village in Montreal, Canada; and Church and Wellesley in Toronto, Canada. Such LGBTQ communities organize special events in addition to pride parades celebrating their culture such as the Gay Games and Southern Decadence. On June 27, 2019, the National LGBTQ Wall of Honor was inaugurated at the Stonewall Inn in Greenwich Village.

== Lesbian culture ==
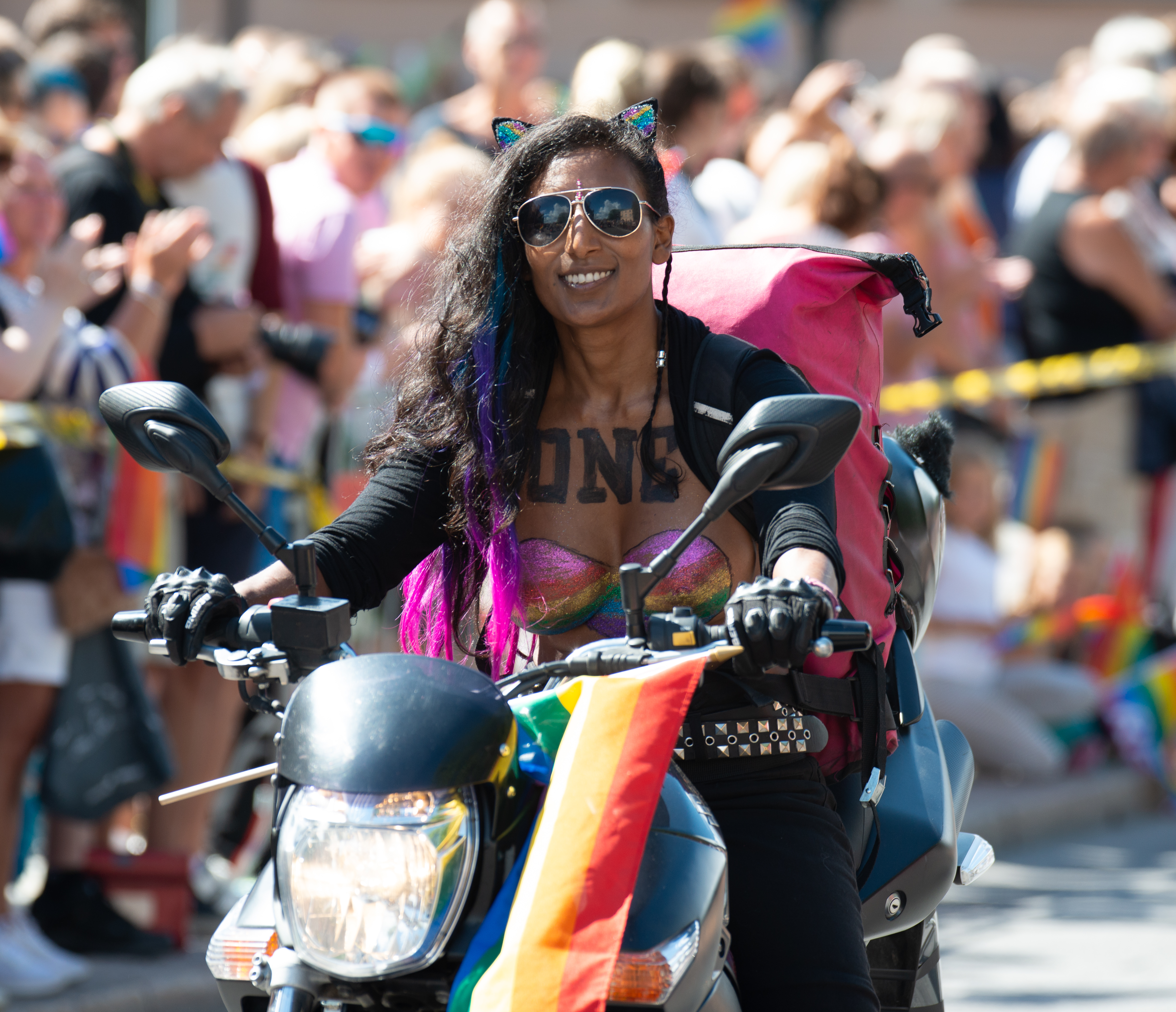
Dykes on Bikes, Hamburg

As with gay men, lesbian culture includes elements from the larger LGBTQ culture, as well as other elements specific to the lesbian community. Pre-Stonewall organizations that advocated for lesbian rights, and provided networking opportunities for lesbians, included the Daughters of Bilitis, formed in San Francisco in 1955. Members held public demonstrations, spoke to the media, and published a newsletter.

Primarily associated with lesbians in North America, Europe, Australia, and New Zealand, lesbian culture has often involved large, predominantly lesbian "women's" events such as the Michigan Womyn's Music Festival (closed after 2015) and the Club Skirts Dinah Shore Weekend. Lesbian culture has its own icons, such as Melissa Etheridge, k.d. lang (butch), Ellen DeGeneres (androgynous) and Portia de Rossi (femme). Lesbian culture since the late 20th century has often been entwined with the evolution of feminism. Lesbian separatism is an example of a lesbian theory and practice identifying specifically lesbian interests and ideas and promoting a specific lesbian culture. Examples of this included womyn's land and women's music. Identity-based sports teams have also been associated with lesbian culture, particularly with the rise of lesbian softball teams and leagues in the 1980s and 1990s. Softball and other athletic teams created social community and allowed lesbians to reject social expectations of physicality, but were typically considered separated from lesbian feminism and political activism.

1950s and early '60s stereotypes of lesbian women stressed a binary of "butch" women, or dykes (who present masculine) and "femmes", or lipstick lesbians (who present feminine), and considered a stereotypical lesbian couple a butch-femme pair. In the 1970s, androgyny, political lesbianism, and lesbian separatism became more common, along with the creation of women's land communities. The late 1980s and 1990s saw a resurgence of butch-femme, and influences from punk, grunge, riot grrrl, emo, and hipster subcultures. A genderqueer subculture developed in the 1980s and 1990s. In the 2010s, the rise of non-binary gender identities brought some degree of return to androgynous styles, though at times with different intentions and interpretations than in the 1970s.

== Gay men's culture ==
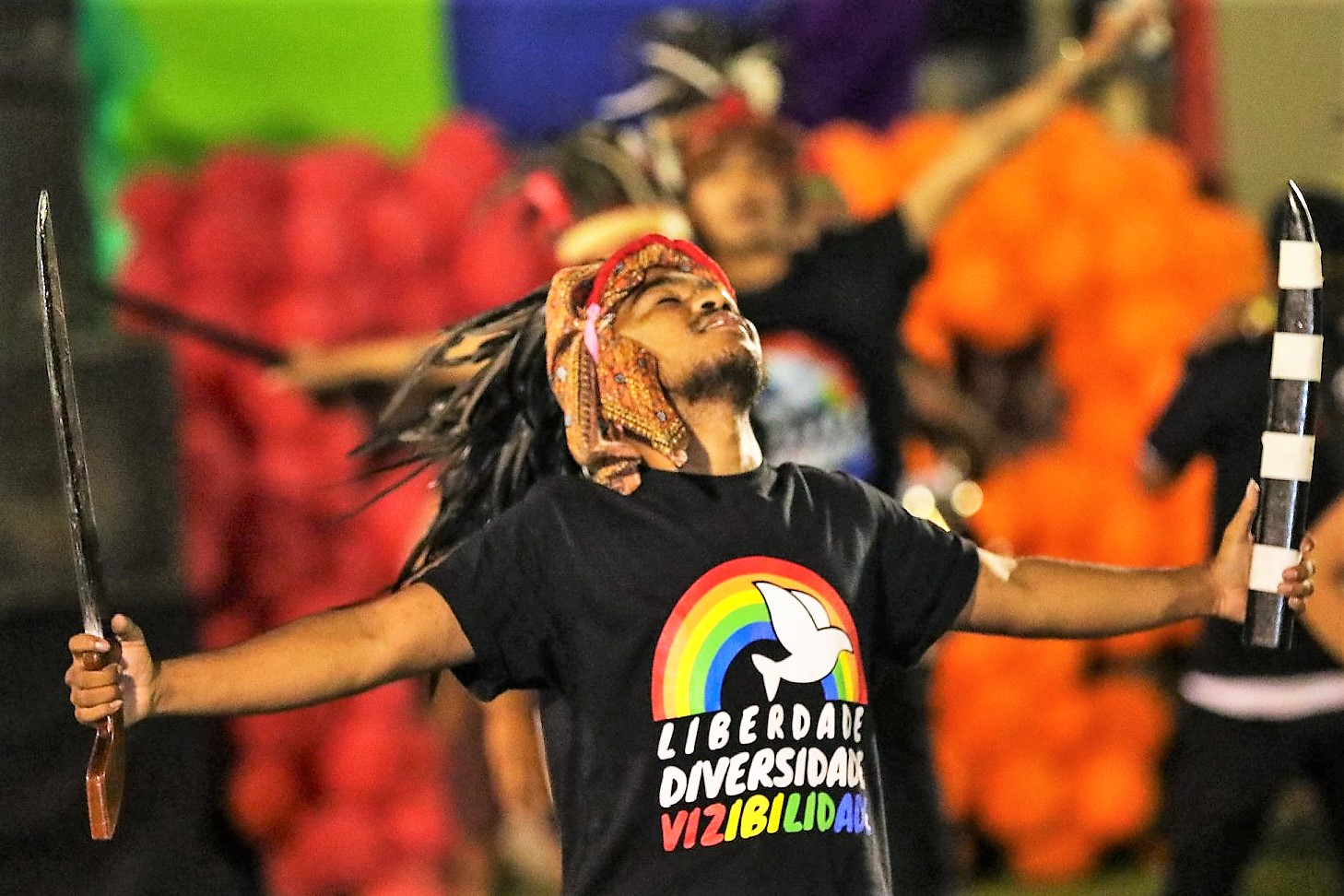
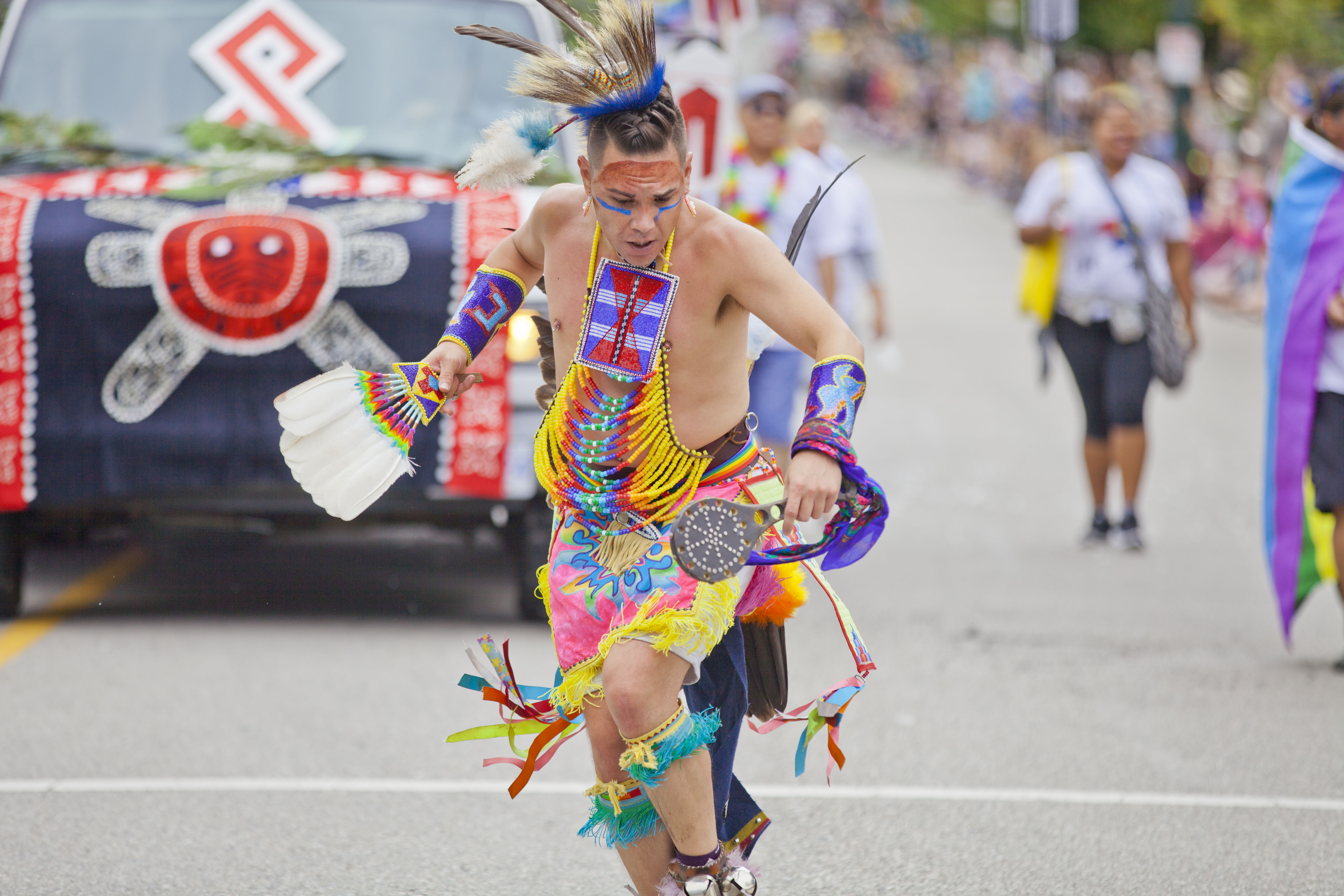
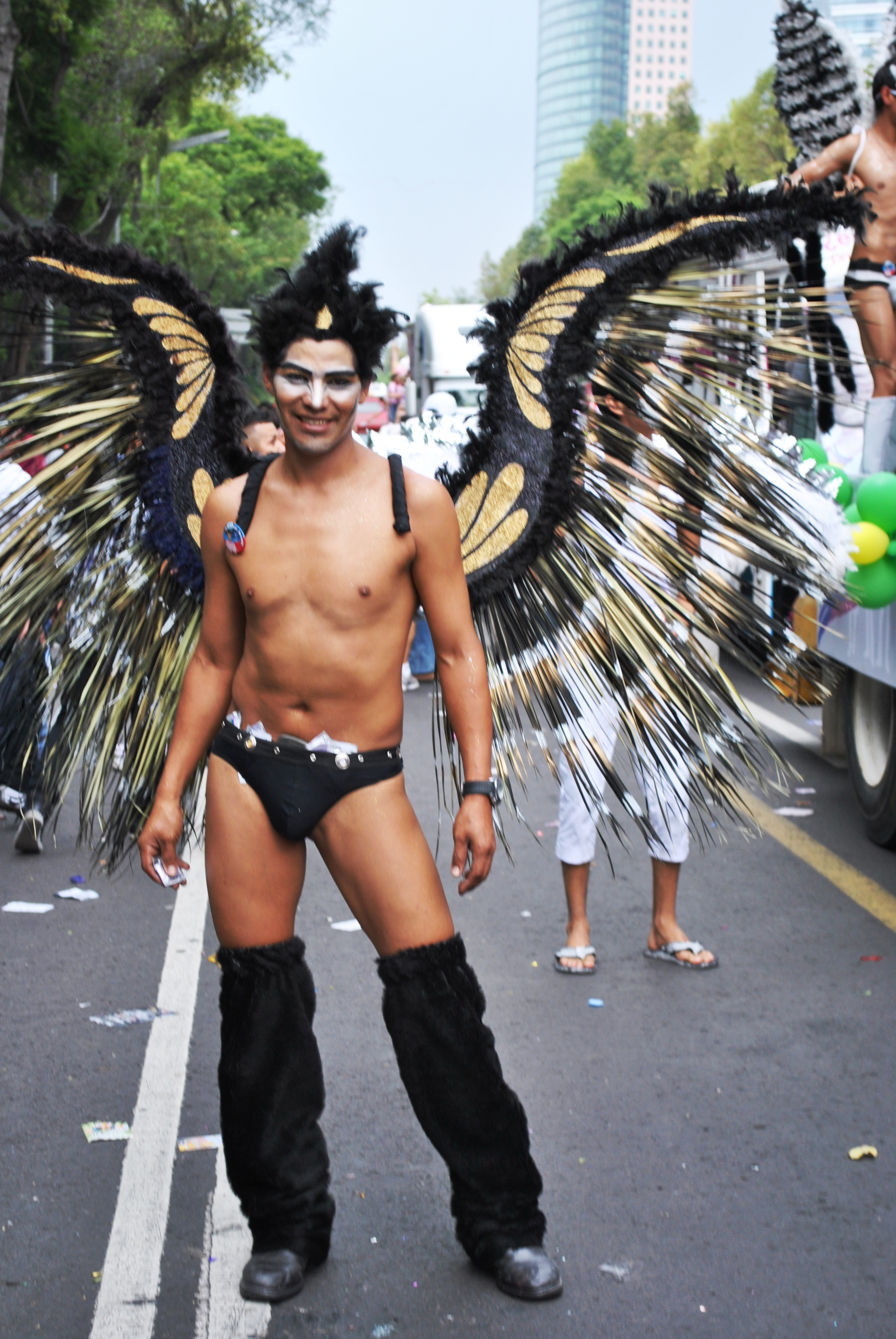
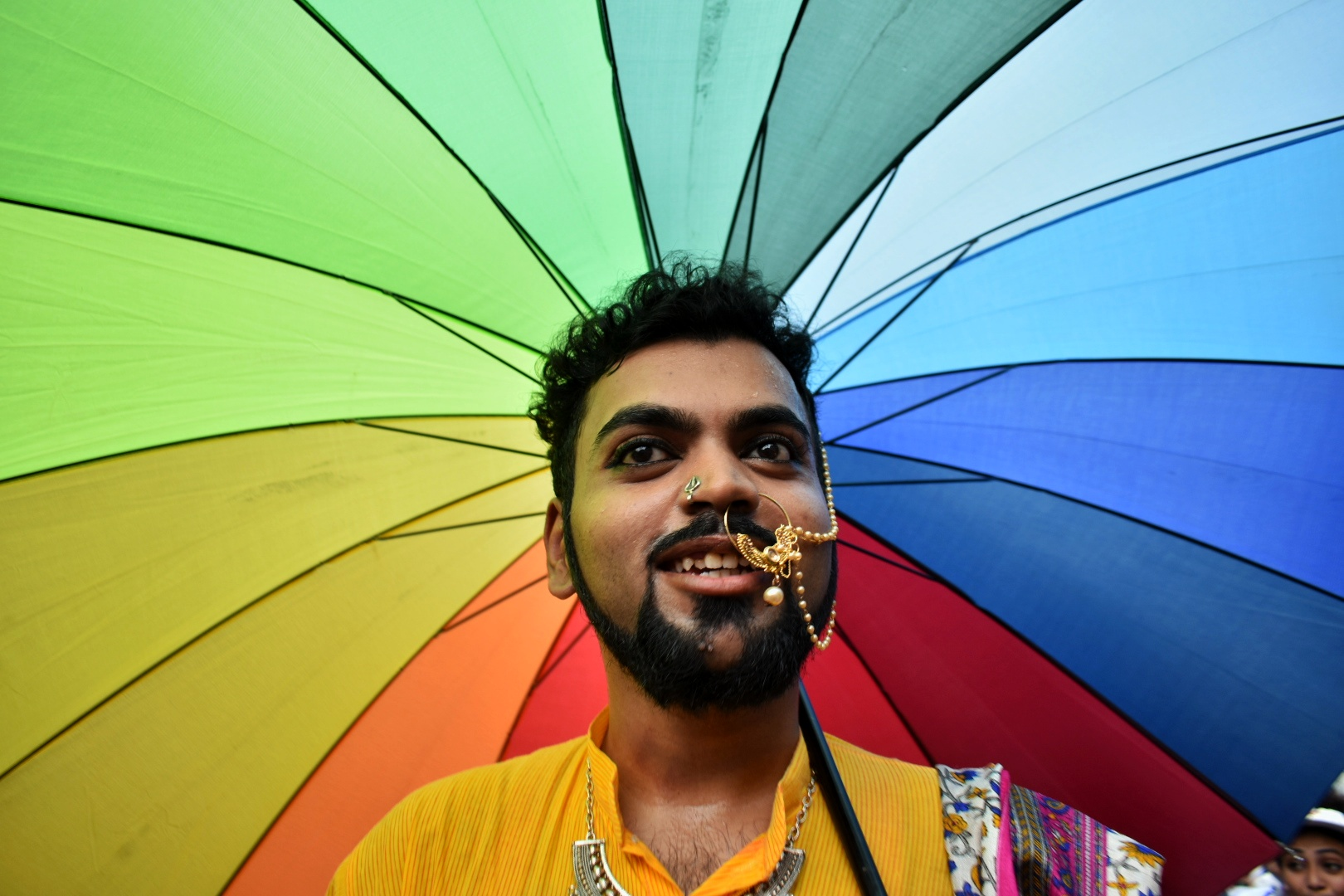
Dili, East Timor (top left), Vancouver, Canada (top right), Mexico City, Mexico (bottom left), and Kolkata, India (bottom right), representing gay men's culture around the world.

According to Herdt, "homosexuality" was the main term used until the late 1950s and early 1960s; after that, a new "gay" culture emerged. "This new gay culture increasingly marks a full spectrum of social life: not only same-sex desires but gay selves, gay neighbors, and gay social practices that are distinctive of our affluent, postindustrial society".

During the 19th and early 20th centuries, gay culture was largely underground or coded, relying on in-group symbols and codes woven into ostensibly straight appearances. Gay influence in early America was more often visible in high culture, where it was nominally safer to be out. The association of gay men with opera, ballet, haute couture, fine cuisine, musical theater, the Golden Age of Hollywood and interior design began with wealthy homosexual men using the straight themes of these media to send their own signals. In the heterocentric Marilyn Monroe film Gentlemen Prefer Blondes, a musical number features Jane Russell singing "Anyone Here for Love" in a gym while muscled men dance around her. The men's costumes were designed by a man, the dance was choreographed by a man and the dancers (as gay screenwriter Paul Rudnick points out) "seem more interested in each other than in Russell"; however, her presence gets the sequence past the censors and works it into an overall heterocentric theme.

After the 1969 Stonewall uprising in New York City was covered on the mainstream news channels, showing images of gay men rioting in the streets, gay male culture among the working classes, people of color, street people, radical political activists and hippies became more visible to mainstream America. Groups such as the Gay Liberation Front formed in New York City, and the Mattachine Society, which had been in existence and doing media since 1950, gained more visibility as they addressed the crowds and media in the wake of the uprisings in Greenwich Village. On June 28, 1970, the first Christopher Street Liberation Day was held, marking the beginning of annual Gay Pride marches.

In 1980 a group of seven gay men formed The Violet Quill in New York City, a literary club focused on writing about the gay experience as a normal plotline instead of a "naughty" sideline in a mostly straight story. An example is the novel A Boy's Own Story by Edmund White. In this first volume of a trilogy, White writes as a young homophilic narrator growing up with a corrupt and remote father. The young man learns bad habits from his straight father, applying them to his gay existence.

American female celebrities such as Liza Minnelli, Jane Fonda, and Bette Midler spent a significant amount of their social time with urban gay men (who were now popularly viewed as sophisticated and stylish by the jet set), and more male celebrities (such as Andy Warhol) were open about their relationships. Such openness was still limited to the largest and most progressive urban areas (such as New York City, San Francisco, Los Angeles, Boston, Philadelphia, Seattle, Chicago, Dallas, Houston, Atlanta, Miami, Washington, D.C., and New Orleans), however, until AIDS forced several popular celebrities out of the closet due to their illness with what was known at first as the "gay cancer".

Elements identified more closely with gay men than with other groups include:

- Pop-culture gay icons who have had a traditionally gay-male following (for example, disco, Britney Spears, Madonna, Mariah Carey, Beyoncé, Judy Garland, Cher, Donna Summer, Lady Gaga, Kesha, Kylie Minogue, and Diana Ross)
- Familiarity with aspects of romantic, sexual and social life common among gay men (for example, Polari, poppers, camp, fag hags and—in South Asian LGBTQ culture—"evening people")
- Beefcake, physique magazines and fitness culture

There are a number of subcultures within gay male culture, such as bears and chubbies. There are also subcultures with an historically large gay-male population, such as leather and SM. Gay critic Michael Musto opined, "I am a harsh critic of the gay community because I feel that when I first came out I thought I would be entering a world of nonconformity and individuality and, au contraire, it turned out to be a world of clones in a certain way. I also hated the whole body fascism thing that took over the gays for a long time."

=== Relationships ===
Some U.S. studies have found that the majority of gay male couples are in monogamous relationships. A representative U.S. study in 2018 found that 32% of gay male couples had open relationships. Research by Colleen Hoff of 566 gay male couples from the San Francisco Bay Area funded by the National Institute of Mental Health found that 45 percent were in monogamous relationships, however it did not use a representative sample. Gay actor Neil Patrick Harris has remarked, "I'm a big proponent of monogamous relationships regardless of sexuality, and I'm proud of how the nation is steering toward that."

During the 1980s and 1990s, Sean Martin drew a comic strip (Doc and Raider) which featured a gay couple living in (or near) Toronto's Gay Village. His characters have recently been updated and moved to the internet. Although primarily humorous, the comic sometimes addressed issues such as gay-bashing, HIV, and spousal abuse.

An Australian study conducted by Roffee and Waling in 2016 discovered how some gay men felt like they were expected to be hyper-sexual. Participants reported how other gay men would automatically assume that any interaction had sexual motivations. Furthermore, if it was then clarified that this is not the case then these gay men would suddenly feel excluded and ignored by the other gay men with which they had been interacting with. They felt that they could not obtain purely platonic friendships with other gay men. One participant reported feeling alienated and disregarded as a person if they were not deemed by other gay men as sexually attractive. This presumption and attitude of hypersexuality is damaging, for it enforces preconceived ideals upon people, who are then ostracised if they do not meet these ideals.

=== Online culture and communities ===
A number of online social websites for gay men have been established. Initially, these concentrated on sexual contact or titillation; typically, users were afforded a profile page, access to other members' pages, member-to-member messaging and instant-message chat. Smaller, more densely connected websites concentrating on social networking without a focus on sexual contact have been established. Some forbid all explicit sexual content; others do not. A gay-oriented retail online couponing site has also been established.

Recent research suggests that gay men primarily make sense of familial and religious challenges by developing online peer supports (i.e., families of choice) in contrast to their family allies' focus on strengthening existing family of origin relationships via online information exchanges. Participants' reported online sociorelational benefits largely contradict recent research indicating that online use may lead to negative mental health outcomes.

Fashion

Notable gay and bisexual fashion designers include Giorgio Armani, Kenneth Nicholson, Alessandro Trincone, Ludovic de Saint Sernin, Patrick Church, Gianni Versace, Prabal Gurung, Michael Kors and others are among the LGBTQ fashion designers across the globe.

== Bisexual culture ==
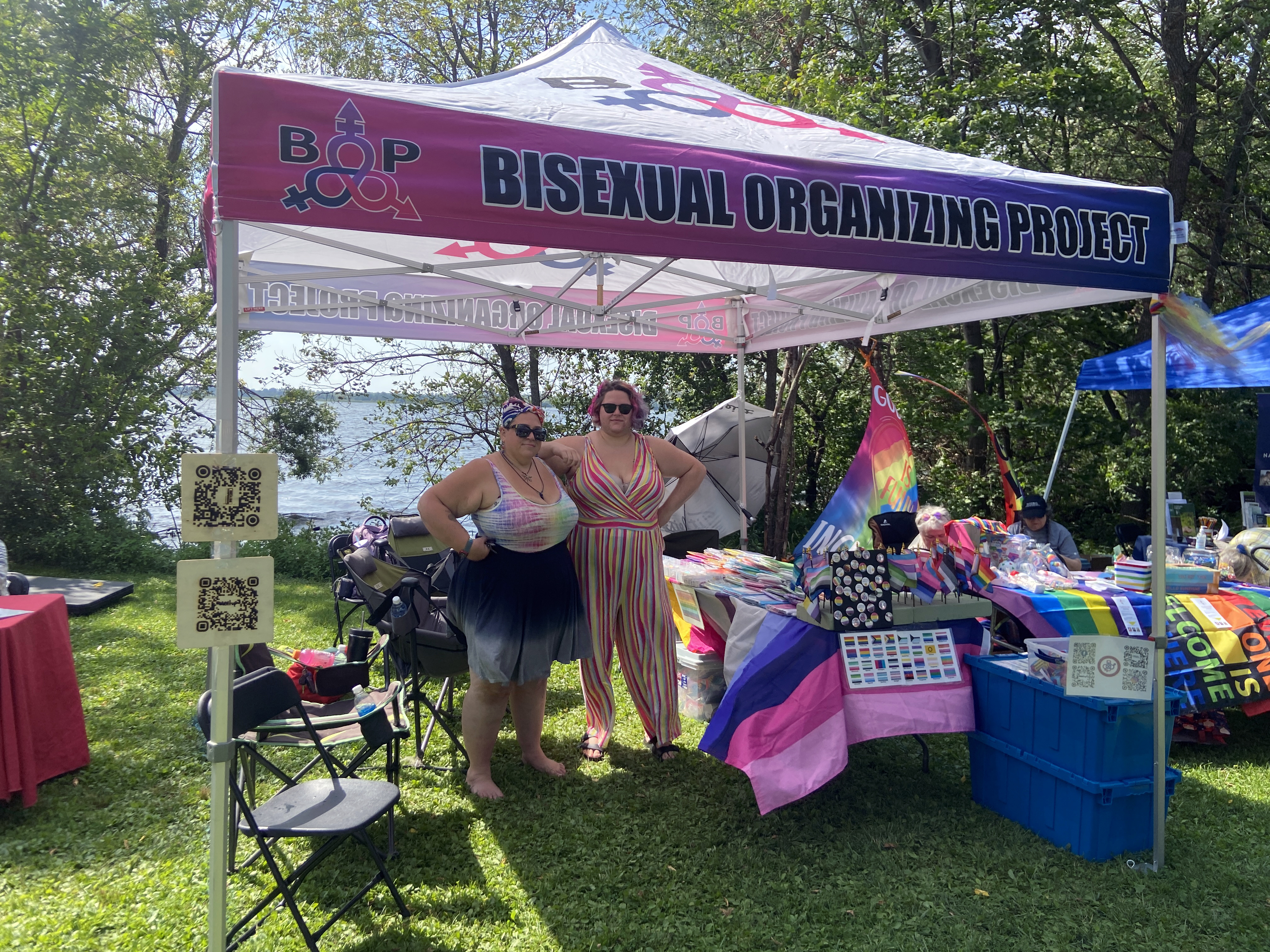
1: Bisexual Pride Flag consisting of pink and blue bars surrounding a lavender bar; 2: Bisexual Organizing Project at Bemidji Pride festival

Bisexual culture emphasizes opposition to, or disregard of, fixed sexual and gender identity monosexism (discrimination against bisexual, fluid, pansexual and queer-identified people), bisexual erasure and biphobia (hatred or mistrust of non-monosexual people). Biphobia is common (although lessening) in the gay, lesbian and straight communities.

Many bisexual, fluid, and pansexual people consider themselves to be part of the LGBTQ or queer community, despite any discrimination they may face. Western bisexual, pansexual, and fluid cultures also have their own touchstones, such as the books Bi Any Other Name: Bisexual People Speak Out (edited by Lani Kaʻahumanu and Loraine Hutchins), Bi: Notes for a Bisexual Revolution (by Shiri Eisner), and Getting Bi: Voices of Bisexuals Around the World (edited by Robyn Ochs); the British science fiction television series Torchwood, and personalities such as British singer and activist Tom Robinson, the Black Eyed Peas member Fergie, Scottish actor Alan Cumming and American performance artist and activist Lady Gaga.

The bisexual pride flag was designed by Michael Page in 1998 to give the community its own symbol, comparable to the gay pride flag of the mainstream LGBTQ community. The deep pink (or rose) stripe at the top of the flag represents same-gender attraction; the royal blue stripe at the bottom of the flag represents different-gender attraction. The stripes overlap in the central fifth of the flag to form a deep shade of lavender (or purple), representing attraction anywhere along the gender spectrum. Celebrate Bisexuality Day has been observed on September 23 by members of the bisexual community and its allies since 1999.

== Transgender culture ==
Transgender pride flag

The study of transgender and transsexual culture is complicated by the many ways in which cultures deal with sexual identity/sexual orientation and gender. For example, in many cultures people who are attracted to people of the same sex—that is, those who in contemporary Western culture would identify as gay, lesbian or bisexual—are classed as a third gender with people who would (in the West) be classified as transgender.

In the contemporary West there are different groups of transgender and transsexual people, such as groups for transsexual people who want gender affirming surgery, male, heterosexual-only cross-dressers and trans men's groups. Groups encompassing all transgender people, both trans men, trans women, and non-binary people, have appeared in recent years.

Some transgender or transsexual women and men, however, do not identify as part of a specific "trans" culture. A distinction may be made between transgender and transsexual people who make their past known to others and those who wish to live according to their gender identity and not reveal their past (believing that they should be able to live normally in their true gender role, and control to whom they reveal their past).

According to a study done by the Williams Institute of UCLA on "How Many Adults Identify as Transgender in the United States?", they found that younger adults are more likely to identify as transgender than older adults. This may be a result of a newly wider acceptance of transgender people from the communities, allowing for those who identify as transgender to have a greater voice. In their research they found that an estimated 0.7% of adults between the ages of 18 and 24 identify as transgender, while 0.6% of adults age 25 to 64 and 0.5% of adults age 65 or older identify as transgender.

The pink on the transgender pride flag represents female while the baby blue on the flag represents male. The white stripe in between the baby blue and pink represents other genders besides male or female.

=== Transgender relationships ===
In the report "Views from both sides of the bridge? Gender, sexual legitimacy, and transgender people's experiences of relationships", authors Iantaffi and Bockting conducted a study with 1229 transgender individuals over 18 years old, to learn more about transgender relationships in the US. When it came to relationships within a transgender person, it depended on if they wanted a heteronormative or mainstream culture relationship. Studies show transgender people can also be victim to heteronormativity too, and it can impact their relationships. There are also transgender people that try to challenge Western traditional beliefs in gender roles and sexual differences within relationships.

=== Events ===
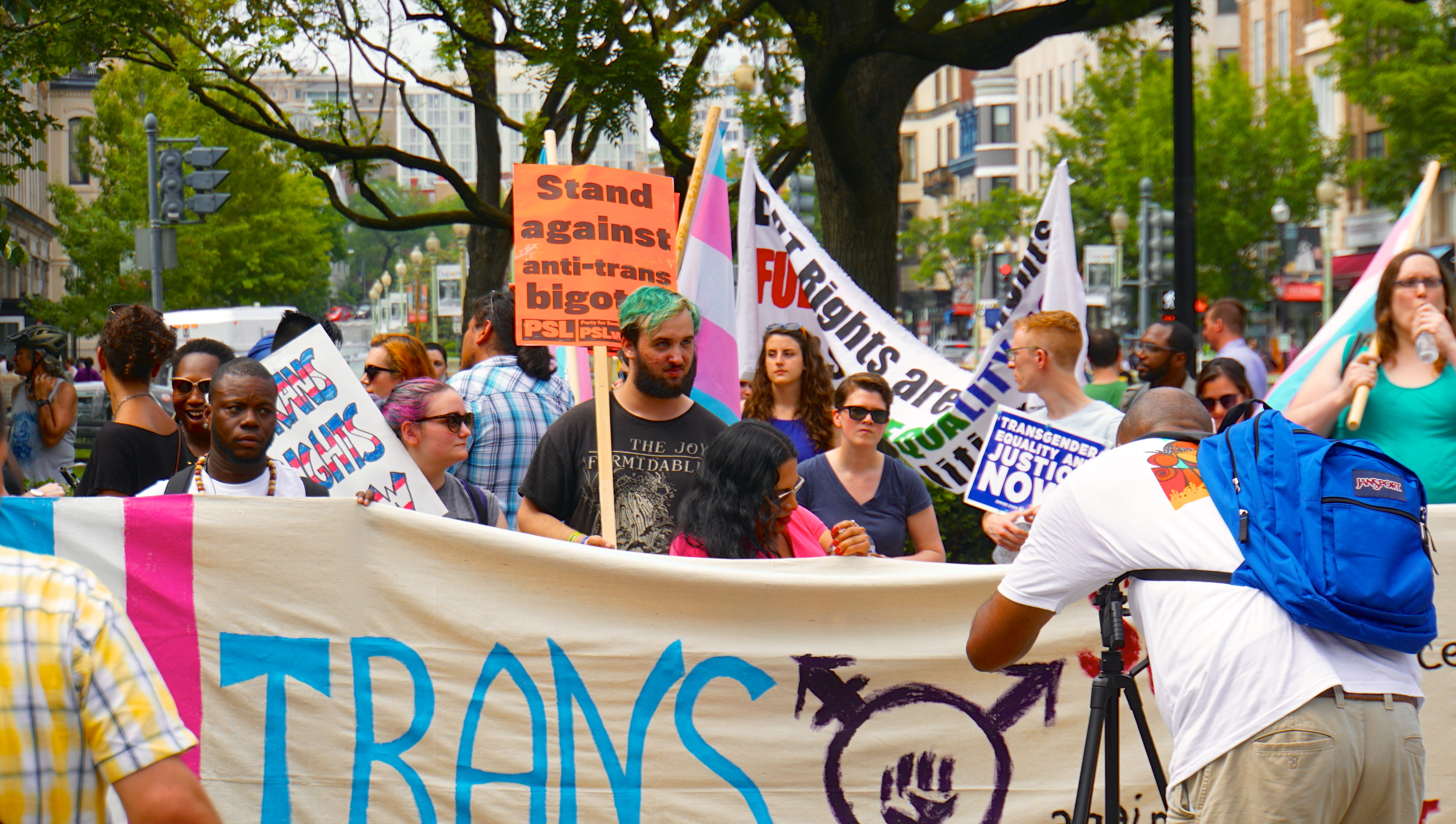
First trans solidarity rally and march, Washington, DC USA (2015)

Many annual events are observed by the transgender community. One of the most widely observed is the Transgender Day of Remembrance (TDOR) which is held every year on November 20 in honor of Rita Hester, who was killed on November 28, 1998, in an anti-transgender hate crime. TDOR serves a number of purposes:

- it memorializes all of those who have been victims of hate crimes and prejudice
- it raises awareness about hate crimes towards the transgender community
- and it honors the dead and their relatives

Related events are the trans marches, a series of annual marches, protests or gatherings that take place around the world, often during the time of the local pride week. These events are frequently organized by transgender communities to build community, address human rights struggles, and create visibility.

== Youth culture ==
Youth pride, an extension of the gay pride and LGBTQ social movements, promotes equality amongst young members (usually above the age of consent) of the lesbian, gay, bisexual, transsexual or transgender, intersex and questioning (LGBTQ) community. The movement exists in many countries and focuses on festivals and parades, enabling many LGBTQ youth to network, communicate, and celebrate their gender and sexual identities. Youth Pride organizers also point to the value in building community and supporting young people, since they are more likely to be bullied. Schools with a gay–straight alliance (GSA) handle discrimination and violence against LGBTQ youth better than schools without it; they develop community and coping skills, and give students a safe space to obtain health and safety information. Sometimes the groups avoid labeling young people, preferring to let them identify themselves on their own terms "when they feel safe".

Gay and lesbian youth have increased risks for suicide, substance abuse, school problems and isolation because of a "hostile and condemning environment, verbal and physical abuse, rejection and isolation from family and peers", according to a U.S. Task Force on Youth Suicide report. Further, LGBTQ youths are more likely to report psychological and physical abuse by parents or caretakers, and more sexual abuse. Suggested reasons for this disparity are:

- youths may be specifically targeted on the basis of their perceived sexual orientation or gender non-conforming appearance.
- "...Risk factors associated with sexual minority status, including discrimination, invisibility, and rejection by family members...may lead to an increase in behaviors that are associated with risk for victimization, such as substance abuse, sex with multiple partners, or running away from home as a teenager."

A 2008 study showed a correlation between the degree of parental rejection of LGB adolescents and negative health problems in the teenagers studied. Crisis centers in larger cities and information sites on the Internet have arisen to help youth and adults. A suicide-prevention helpline for LGBTQ youth is part of The Trevor Project, established by the filmmakers after the 1998 HBO telecast of the Academy Award-winning short film Trevor; Daniel Radcliffe donated a large sum to the group, and has appeared in its public service announcements condemning homophobia.

Increasing mainstream acceptance of the LGBTQ communities prompted the Massachusetts Governor's Commission on Gay and Lesbian Youth to begin an annual Gay–Straight Youth Pride observance in 1995. In 1997 the nonprofit Youth Pride Alliance, a coalition of 25 youth-support and advocacy groups, was founded to hold an annual youth-pride event in Washington, D.C.; Candace Gingrich was a speaker the following year. In 1999, the first annual Vermont Youth Pride Day was held. As of 2009 it is the largest queer and allied-youth event in Vermont, organized by Outright Vermont to "break the geographic and social barriers gay youngsters living in rural communities face." In 2002, a college fair was added to the event to connect students with colleges and discuss student safety. In April 2003 a Youth Pride Chorus, organized with New York's LGBT Community Center, began rehearsals and later performed at a June Carnegie Hall Pride concert with the New York City Gay Men's Chorus.

In 2004 the San Diego chapter of Gay, Lesbian and Straight Education Network (GLSEN) worked with San Diego Youth Pride coordinators to organize a Day of Silence throughout the county. In 2005, Decatur (Georgia) Youth Pride participated in a counter-demonstration against Westboro Baptist Church (led by church head Fred Phelps' daughter Shirley Phelps-Roper), who were "greeting students and faculty as they arrived with words such as 'God hates fag enablers' and 'Thank God for 9/11'" at ten locations. In 2008 Chicago's Youth Pride Center, primarily serving "LGBTQ youth of color", opened a temporary location and planned to move into their new building on Chicago's South Side in 2010. In 2009, the Utah Pride Center held an event to coincide with Youth Pride Walk 2009, a "cross-country walk by two Utah women trying to draw attention to the problems faced by homeless LGBTQ youth". In August 2010 the first Hollywood Youth Pride was held, focusing on the "large number of homeless LGBTQ youth living on Los Angeles streets." According to a 2007 report, "Of the estimated 1.6 million homeless American youth, between 20 and 40 percent identify as lesbian, gay, bisexual or transgender". At larger pride parades and festivals there are often LGBTQ or queer youth contingents, and some festivals designate safe spaces for young people.

LGBTQ youth are more likely to be homeless than heterosexual, cisgender youth due to the rejection from their parents because of their sexual orientation, or gender identity (Choi et al., 2015; Durso and Gates, 2012; Mallon, 1992; Whitbeck et al., 2004). Out of the 1.6 million homeless people in the United States, forty percent of them identify as part of the LGBTQ community. In a survey of street outreach programs 7% of the youth were transgender (Whitbeck, Lazoritz, Crawford, & Hautala, 2014). Many of the transgender youth that are placed in homeless shelters do not get the type of help they need and often experience discrimination and systemic barriers that include sex-segregated programs in institutional practices that refuse to understand their gender. Many transgender youths have problems acquiring shelters because of certain policies like binary gender rules, dress codes, and room assignments (Thaler et al., 2009). Problems with classification happen when the procedures or policies of a shelter require the youth to be segregated based on their assigned sex rather than what they classify themselves as. As a result, many of the LGBTQ youth end up on the street instead of shelters which are meant to protect them.

LGBTQ youth also have a higher suicide rate in the U.S. Those who identify with the LGBTQ community are four times as likely to attempt suicide than those who do not. There was a study that was done to look into the difference of rates between gay high school students and their straight peers. They were asked about their sexual orientation and then about suicide. They found that about 32 percent of sexual minorities (Lesbian, Gay, Bisexual) had suicidal thoughts in comparison to almost 9.5 percent of their heterosexual peers.

== Pride ==
LGBTQ parades are outdoor events celebrating LGBTQ social and self acceptance, achievements and legal rights.

== Other LGBTQ cultures ==
Several other segments of the LGBTQ community have their own communities and cultures.

African-American LGBTQ culture

In the United States and Europe, some cities host black gay pride events with a focus on celebrating the black gay community and culture. The two largest in the world are Atlanta Black Pride and D.C. Black Pride. UK Black Pride is the largest celebration of its kind outside the U.S.

Movements and politics

LGBTQ social movements are social movements that advocate for LGBTQ people in society. Social movements may focus on equal rights, such as the 2000s movement for marriage equality, or they may focus on liberation, as in the gay liberation movement of the 1960s and 1970s.

LGBTQ conservatism is a socio-political movement which embraces and promotes the ideology of conservatism within an LGBTQ context.

LGBTQ culture in the military

In 2010, the repeal of the Don't Ask Don't Tell (DADT) was a great step in the inclusion of lesbian, gay, and bisexual individuals in the military. "The repeal of DADT reversed the practice of discharging LGB service members on the basis of sexual identity." Although this was a large shift in policy by the U.S. for those identifying as LGB, those who are transgender are still not fully included in this change.

- Some challenges that transgender people face post-DADT are "changing their name to align with their gender identity, changing their sex designation in official documentation and records, encouraging appropriate pronoun use, and obtaining appropriate medical services" (Levy et al., 2015; Parco et al., 2015a, 2015b).
- Another challenge that they face is transphobia, which is "the intense dislike or prejudice against transsexual or transgender people" (Hill & Willoughby).

== Criticism ==
Criticism of LGBTQ culture comes from a variety of sources, much of which is critique from within the community itself. Some, like Michael Musto, view the culture as conforming to caricatures or stereotypes that alienate "fringe" members of the community. Mattilda Bernstein Sycamore and movements like Gay Shame have argued that LGBTQ culture has been depoliticized by a tiny minority of relatively privileged queer people, who participate in "institutions of oppression" at the expense of the vast majority of LGBTQ people. Some consider the very notion of "separatism", or a group lifestyle, alienating (including of LGBTQ members in the broader society).

Another problem is that bisexual and transsexual/transgender individuals experience social pressure to identify as gay or lesbian, and may face ostracism and discrimination from the mainstream LGBTQ culture. For bisexuals, this pressure is known as bisexual erasure. New York University School of Law professor Kenji Yoshino has written, "Gays de-legitimatize bisexuals...the lesbian and gay community abounds with negative images of bisexuals as fence-sitters, traitors, cop-outs, closet cases, people whose primary goal in life is to retain 'heterosexual privilege'".

=== Identity politics ===
Criticism has been made that the LGBTQ community represents an artificial separation, rather than one based on tangible customs or ethnic identification. In particular, labels that LGBTQ members use to describe themselves vary widely; some simply prefer to identify as loving a particular gender. Some believe that the LGBTQ community concept is alienating; the term itself implies estrangement from straight people as a separate group. Further, including three groups involved with sexuality and one group exploring transsexual/transgender identity (a broader phenomenon) is artificial.

Mattilda Bernstein Sycamore argues that the single-issue focus of LGBTQ politics, which ignores all intra-group differences, has naturally led to a movement and culture focused on the needs of white, middle-class gay cisgender men, which alienates anyone who does not fit that description.

=== Cultural focus on promiscuity ===
Some gay male commentators who are in monogamous relationships argue that mainstream gay culture's disdain of monogamy and its promotion of promiscuity has harmed efforts to legalize same-sex marriage. Yuvraj Joshi argues that efforts to legalize same-sex marriage have emphasized the sameness of gay people to heterosexuals, while privatizing their queer differences.

=== Racism ===
British journalist Mark Simpson's 1996 book, Anti-Gay, describes forms of intolerance by the mainstream gay community towards subgroups. The Times wrote that Simpson succeeded in "pointing out that oppression and prejudice do not become legitimate just because they happen to be practiced by the previously oppressed". Aiden Shaw of Time Out New York wrote that "Thank fucking God someone did this, because...whatever happened to our individuality, our differences?" Other commentators harshly criticized Simpson's argument, with Boyz declaring that "Simpson is a cunt."

== See also ==
- Heterosexism
- Homosocialization
- House music
- List of LGBTQ rights activists
- LGBTQ history
- Top, bottom and versatile
- Cannabis and LGBTQ culture
- The Eagle (gay bars)
