= Herb Russell =

American politician

Member of the Vermont House of Representatives from the Rutland-5-3 district
- In office January 5, 2011 – 2017
- Preceded by: Steven Howard

Personal details
- Born: March 23, 1953 (age 73)
- Party: Democratic
- Education: University of Kentucky
- Profession: Flight attendant (ret.)

Herbert A. Font-Russell was an American politician from Rutland City, Vermont. A member of the Democratic Party, he was elected to the Vermont House of Representatives in 2010, representing the Rutland-5-3 district. He took office on January 5, 2011.

In his first term Russell successfully sponsored legislation to tighten copper theft penalties. Successive terms worked on Rutland issues: Saving the Amtrak Ethan Allen working to secure grants while serving on House Transportation Committee to build Western Rail Corridor, New Dorr & Ripley bridges, NEW senior housing in renovated historic Watkins School, sponsored John Deere historic birthplace sign and sponsoring numerous other historic state markers signifying Rutland & Vermont Rail history around the state. He sponsored a resolution for intercity bus service for Rutland, with VTrans bringing back 'Vermont Transit Lines' routes through the Rutland Transit Center. Herb Russell was most proud to sponsor, in his final act before retiring from the Vermont Legislature, the 'Vermont Marriage Equality' state historic marker located between Vermont Statehouse and Supreme Court dedicated on Tuesday October 17, 2017 celebrating Vermont's role as 'first' in the nation!

A former flight attendant, Russell spent almost 30 years with American Airlines until retiring in 2004. He joined American in 1976, after spending a year with Allegheny Airlines and two years with Northwest Orient Airlines. He had previously attended two colleges, the State University of New York and the University of Kentucky. Since retiring from American Airlines in 2004, he has worked for the CRDA Casino Reinvestment Development Authority in Atlantic City, followed by South Jersey Transportation Authority, then after moving to Vermont at the historic Equinox Hotel in Manchester, Vermont and as a 'Passenger Conductor' on the Green Mountain Railroad. In Retirement Russell works as a Parking Enforcement Officer in Rehoboth Beach, Delaware. He was appointed by Delaware Governor John Carney in May 2017 to serve on the Board of Architects in Dover.

In 2008 Russell was a leader in the successful effort to keep Amtrak's Ethan Allen Express train in Rutland, founding Friends of Rutland Rail. He has served on the board of the Vermont Rail Action Network and Sustainable Rutland, both since 2009.

He ran for state representative in 2010, one of three candidates seeking one seat in the Rutland-5-3 district. The incumbent state representative, Democrat Steven Howard was vacating the seat to run for Lieutenant Governor. In the Democratic primary election held on August 24, Russell defeated Daniel P. White by 165 votes to 60. In the general election held on November 2, Russell was elected, defeating Republican nominee Carl J. Haas by 454 votes to 437. He took office on January 5, 2011. Russell announced he would not seek a third term, retiring in 2016. Russell returned to his beloved Rehoboth Beach, Delaware to retire among LGBTQ friends, where he remains active in CAMP Rehoboth as well as Epworth UMC.

While living in West Virginia in the 1990s, he ran twice for the West Virginia Senate, winning the 1992 primary, but did not appear on the general election ballot after a protracted case in the West Virginia Supreme Court. He lost a subsequent 1996 primary race. He moved to Vermont in 2007.

Russell is openly gay; he married long-time partner Roberto Font-Russell in 2009 but divorced in 2011 changing his name from Font-Russell back to Russell. He is one of six openly gay members of the Vermont Legislature, alongside representatives Bill Lippert (D–Hinesburg), Matt Trieber (D–Bellows Falls) and Joanna E. Cole (D–Burlington), as well as senators Brian Campion (D–Bennington) and Becca Balint (D–Windham).

== Early life ==
Russell was born in Seneca Falls, New York.
