= Joanna Cole (politician) =

American politician (born 1948)

Member of the Vermont House of Representatives from the Chittenden-6-1 district
- In office January 9, 2013 – 2017
- Preceded by: Bill Aswad
- Succeeded by: Carol Ode

Personal details
- Born: January 23, 1948 (age 78) Troy, New York, U.S.
- Party: Democratic
- Spouse: Sarah Flynn
- Profession: Educator (ret.)
- Website: joannacole.org

Joanna E. Cole (born January 23, 1948) is an American politician and educator from Burlington, Vermont, in the United States. A member of the Democratic Party, she was elected to the Vermont House of Representatives in 2012, representing the Chittenden-6-1 district, which includes Burlington's New North End. She took office on January 9, 2013.

== Early life and career ==
Born in Troy, New York and educated at the University of North Carolina at Charlotte, Cole taught college-level chemistry, including stints at Millersville University of Pennsylvania and Lebanon Valley College.

== In politics ==
=== 2008 campaign ===
Cole first ran for the Vermont House in 2008, one of five candidates seeking two seats in the Chittenden-3-1 district. She placed second in the Democratic primary election behind incumbent Bill Aswad, beating the third-placed finisher by seven votes and assuring herself of a place on the general election ballot. In the general election, the two Democratic nominees and the two Republican nominees were chasing two seats. Cole finished third, behind the two incumbents: Kurt Wright, a Republican, and Aswad, a Democrat.

=== 2010 campaign ===
In 2010, Cole ran again in the Chittenden-3-1 district. This time, there were only three contenders: Cole and the two incumbents. In the general election, Cole once again placed third, trailing Wright and Aswad.

=== 2012 campaign ===
In 2012, due to redistricting, Cole's home was placed in the new two-member Chittenden-6-1 district, as were Wright's and Aswad's residences. Cole was one of four candidates running, including three Democrats. In the Democratic primary election, she placed first, beating incumbent Bill Aswad into second place. Cole and Aswad proceeded to the general election, as did Republican incumbent Kurt Wright. In the general election, Wright finished first with 2,332 votes while Cole came second, with 2,008. She beat out Aswad by just 21 votes.

== Personal ==
She was director of the League of Women Voters of Vermont from 2007 to 2012. A Quaker, she has served as the representative of the Burlington Society of Friends to the Burlington Area Ministerial Association. She has also served as a Justice of the Peace since 2007.

Cole is openly bisexual. She is married to Sarah Flynn, a retired priest. Her 2012 campaign won the support of the Gay & Lesbian Victory Fund. She is one of six openly LGBT members of the Vermont Legislature, alongside representatives Bill Lippert (D–Hinesburg), Matt Trieber (D–Bellows Falls) and Herb Russell (D–Rutland), as well as senators Brian Campion (D–Bennington) and Becca Balint (D–Windham).

== Electoral history ==
Joanna Cole electoral history

2008 Vermont House of Representatives Chittenden 3-1 district election
Primary election
Party	Candidate	Votes	%
Democratic	Bill Aswad (incumbent)	342	42.48%
Democratic	Joanna Cole	234	29.07%
Democratic	Susan Wheeler	227	28.20%
Write-in		2	0.25%
Total votes		805	100.00%
General election
Republican	Kurt Wright (incumbent)	2,196	32.57%
Democratic	Bill Aswad (incumbent)	2,195	32.56%
Democratic	Joanna Cole	1,649	24.46%
Republican	Scott Beaudin	694	10.29%
Write-in		8	0.12%
Total votes		6,742	100.00%

2010 Vermont House of Representatives Chittenden 3-1 district election
Primary election
Party	Candidate	Votes	%
Democratic	Bill Aswad (incumbent)	843	50.97%
Democratic	Joanna Cole	800	48.37%
Write-in		11	0.67%
Total votes		1,654	100.00%
	Blank/Spoiled	668	
General election
Republican	Kurt Wright (incumbent)	1,806	39.18%
Democratic	Bill Aswad (incumbent)	1,526	33.11%
Democratic	Joanna Cole	1,277	27.71%
Total votes		4,609	100.00%

2012 Vermont House of Representatives Chittenden 6-1 district election
Primary election
Party	Candidate	Votes	%
Democratic	Joanna Cole	658	36.04%
Democratic	Bill Aswad (incumbent)	619	33.90%
Democratic	Robert Hooper	536	29.35%
Write-in		13	0.71%
Total votes		1,826	100.00%
	Blank/Spoiled	568	
General election
Republican	Kurt Wright (incumbent)	2,332	36.86%
Democratic	Joanna Cole	2,008	31.74%
Democratic	Bill Aswad (incumbent)	1,987	31.41%
Total votes		6,327	100.00%

2014 Vermont House of Representatives Chittenden 6-1 district election
Primary election
Party	Candidate	Votes	%
Democratic	Joanna Cole (incumbent)	363	82.69%
Write-in		76	17.31%
Total votes		439	100.00%
	Blank/Spoiled	591	
General election
Republican	Kurt Wright (incumbent)	1,598	30.95%
Democratic	Joanna Cole (incumbent)	1,265	24.50%
Republican	Michael Ly	1,217	23.57%
Democratic	Robert Hooper	953	18.46%
Libertarian	Loyal Ploof	68	1.32%
Libertarian	Roy Collette	49	0.95%
Write-in		13	0.25%
Total votes		5,163	100.00%
	Blank/Spoiled	359	

2016 Vermont House of Representatives Chittenden 6-1 district election
Primary election
Party	Candidate	Votes	%
Democratic	Joanna Cole (incumbent)	967	52.41%
Democratic	Carol Ode	858	46.50%
Write-in		20	1.08%
Total votes		1,845	100.00%
	Blank/Spoiled	885	
General election
Democratic	Carol Ode	2,559	34.08%
Republican	Kurt Wright (incumbent)	2,135	28.44%
Democratic	Joanna Cole (incumbent)	2,068	27.54%
Republican	Mike McGarghan	729	9.71%
Write-in		17	0.23%
Total votes		7,508	100.00%
	Blank/Spoiled	1,494	
