= Robert Hooper (Vermont politician) =

American politician from Vermont

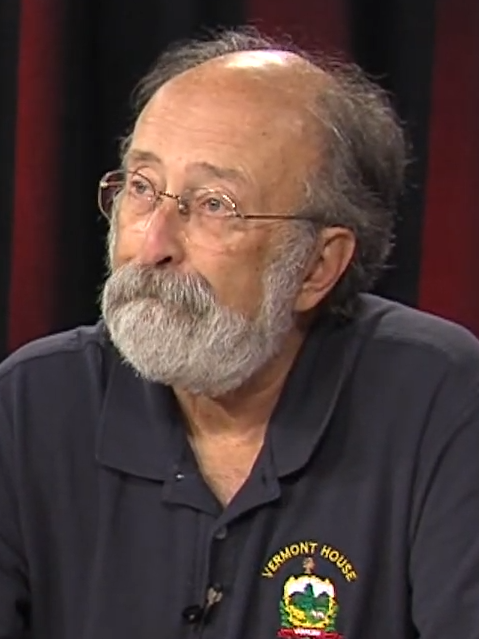
- Hooper in 2024

Member of the Vermont House of Representatives
- In office 2019 – March 16, 2026
- Succeeded by: Kevin Scully
- Constituency: Chittenden 6-1 district (2019-2023); Chittenden 18 district (2023-2026)

Personal details
- Party: Democratic
- Robert Hooper's voice Robert Hooper asking a question during a committee meeting of the committee on Government operations and military affairs Recorded February 27, 2024

Robert Hooper is an American politician from Vermont. He is a U.S. Army veteran and served from 2019 to 2026 as a Democratic member of the Vermont House of Representatives. He resigned in March 2026 after being found to have violated the chamber's sexual harassment rules according to findings by the House Sexual Harassment Prevention Panel of the Vermont House of Representatives.

== Early life and education ==
Hooper joined the Army in 1971 and served in the signal corps as a radio operator.

== Electoral history ==
Robert Hooper electoral history

2012 Vermont House of Representatives Chittenden 6-1 district Democratic primary
| Party | Candidate | Votes | % |
|---|---|---|---|
| Democratic | Joanna Cole | 658 | 36.04% |
| Democratic | Bill Aswad (incumbent) | 619 | 33.90% |
| Democratic | Robert Hooper | 536 | 29.35% |
| Write-in | | 13 | 0.71% |
| Total votes | | 1,826 | 100.00% |
| | Blank/Spoiled | 568 | |

2014 Vermont House of Representatives Chittenden 6-1 district election
| Party | Candidate | Votes | % |
|---|---|---|---|
| Republican | Kurt Wright (incumbent) | 1,598 | 30.95% |
| Democratic | Joanna Cole (incumbent) | 1,265 | 24.50% |
| Republican | Michael Ly | 1,217 | 23.57% |
| Democratic | Robert Hooper | 953 | 18.46% |
| Libertarian | Loyal Ploof | 68 | 1.32% |
| Libertarian | Roy Collette | 49 | 0.95% |
| Write-in | | 13 | 0.25% |
| Total votes | | 5,163 | 100.00% |
| | Blank/Spoiled | 359 | |

2018 Vermont House of Representatives Chittenden 6-1 district election
Primary election
| Party | Candidate | Votes | % |
|---|---|---|---|
| Democratic | Carol Ode (incumbent) | 1,133 | 57.25% |
| Democratic | Robert Hooper | 831 | 41.99% |
| Write-in | | 15 | 0.76% |
| Total votes | | 1,979 | 100.00% |
| | Blank/Spoiled | 881 | |
General election
| Democratic | Carol Ode (incumbent) | 2,680 | 41.05% |
| Democratic | Robert Hooper | 1,999 | 30.62% |
| Republican | Kurt Wright (incumbent) | 1,833 | 28.08% |
| Write-in | | 16 | 0.25% |
| Total votes | | 6,528 | 100.00% |
| | Blank/Spoiled | 1,582 | |

2020 Vermont House of Representatives Chittenden 6-1 district election
Primary election
| Party | Candidate | Votes | % |
|---|---|---|---|
| Democratic | Carol Ode (incumbent) | 1,586 | 52.19% |
| Democratic | Robert Hooper (incumbent) | 1,421 | 46.76% |
| Write-in | | 32 | 1.05% |
| Total votes | | 3,039 | 100.00% |
| | Blank/Spoiled | 1,045 | |
General election
| Democratic | Carol Ode (incumbent) | 3,641 | 51.45% |
| Democratic | Robert Hooper (incumbent) | 3,305 | 46.70% |
| Write-in | | 131 | 1.85% |
| Total votes | | 7,077 | 100.00% |
| | Blank/Spoiled | 2,997 | |

2022 Vermont House of Representatives Chittenden 18 district election
Primary election
| Party | Candidate | Votes | % |
|---|---|---|---|
| Democratic | Carol Ode (incumbent) | 1,601 | 53.80% |
| Democratic | Robert Hooper (incumbent) | 1,356 | 45.56% |
| Write-in | | 19 | 0.64% |
| Total votes | | 2,976 | 100.00% |
| | Blank/Spoiled | 1,040 | |
General election
| Democratic | Carol Ode (incumbent) | 2,956 | 50.62% |
| Democratic | Robert Hooper (incumbent) | 2,768 | 47.40% |
| Write-in | | 116 | 1.99% |
| Total votes | | 5,840 | 100.00% |
| | Blank/Spoiled | 2,136 | |

2024 Vermont House of Representatives Chittenden 18 district election
Primary election
| Party | Candidate | Votes | % |
|---|---|---|---|
| Democratic | Carol Ode (incumbent) | 963 | 51.17% |
| Democratic | Robert Hooper (incumbent) | 895 | 47.56% |
| Write-in | | 24 | 1.27% |
| Total votes | | 1,882 | 100.00% |
| | Blank/Spoiled | 474 | |
General election
| Democratic | Carol Ode (incumbent) | 3,264 | 50.36% |
| Democratic | Robert Hooper (incumbent) | 3,091 | 47.69% |
| Write-in | | 123 | 1.90% |
| Total votes | | 6,481 | 100.00% |
| | Blank/Spoiled | 3,082 | |
