= Matt Trieber =

American politician

Member of the Vermont House of Representatives from the Windham-3 district
- Incumbent
- Assumed office January 25, 2011
- Preceded by: Mike Obuchowski

Personal details
- Born: Lynbrook, New York, U.S.
- Party: Democratic
- Website: matttrieber.com

Matthew A. Trieber, known as Matt Trieber, is an American politician from Bellows Falls, Vermont. A member of the Democratic Party, he is also a member of the Vermont House of Representatives, representing the Windham-3 district. He was appointed to the legislature by Governor Peter Shumlin in January 2011.

Born and raised in Lynbrook, New York, Trieber is a graduate of the State University of New York at Stony Brook, where he earned a degree in earth and space sciences. He works as an environmental consultant.

Trieber ran for the Rockingham selectboard in 2010, winning a one-year seat. When a three-year seat opened up on the board later in 2010, Trieber sought it and was elected.

In January 2011, longtime state representative Mike Obuchowski stepped down from the legislature to become Vermont’s Commissioner of Buildings and General Services. On January 21, 2011, newly elected governor Peter Shumlin announced that he had selected Trieber to fill Obuchowski's seat representing the Windham-4 district. Trieber took office on January 25.

Trieber ran for election to the Windham-3 seat in 2012, after redistricting changed the composition of the state's districts. Three candidates filed for the district's two seats, all of them Democrats. Trieber faced Christopher Moore and Rep. Carolyn Partridge in the primary election held on August 29, 2012 and finished second, giving him a place on the November ballot. Trieber and Partridge ran unopposed in the general election.

Matt Trieber is openly gay. His 2012 election campaign won the support of the Gay & Lesbian Victory Fund. He is one of six openly gay members of the Vermont Legislature, alongside representatives Bill Lippert (D–Hinesburg), Herb Russell (D–Rutland) and Joanna E. Cole (D–Burlington), as well as senators Brian Campion (D–Bennington) and Becca Balint (D–Windham).
