= Kevin Scully =

Kevin Scully may refer to:

- Kevin Scully (New Hampshire politician)
- Kevin Scully (Vermont politician)
