= 2010 Vermont lieutenant gubernatorial election =

- November 2, 2010
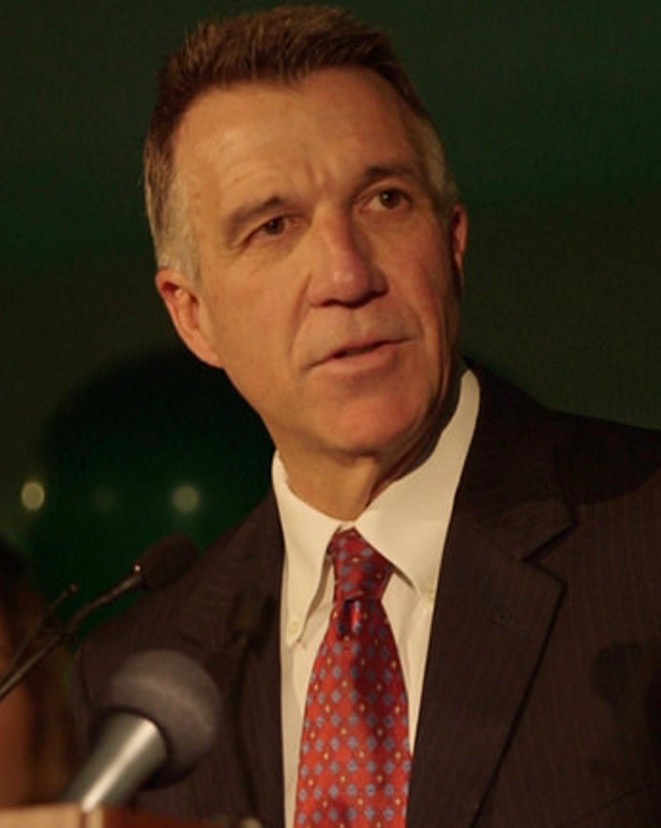

Nominee	Phil Scott	Steven Howard
Party	Republican	Democratic
Popular vote	116,198	99,843
Percentage	49.38%	42.43%
- County results Scott: 40–50% 50–60% 60–70% Howard: 40–50% 50–60%
Lieutenant Governor before election
Brian Dubie
Republican
Elected Lieutenant Governor
Phil Scott
Republican

The 2010 Vermont lieutenant gubernatorial election was held on November 2, 2010, to elect the lieutenant governor of Vermont. Incumbent Republican Brian Dubie retired to run unsuccessfully for governor of Vermont. Republican Vermont state senator Phil Scott won the election, defeating Democratic Vermont state representative Steven Howard by six percentage points.

== Republican primary ==
=== Candidates ===
- Phil Scott, Vermont state senator from the Washington district (2001–2011)
- Mark Snelling, businessman and son of former governor Richard A. Snelling and former lieutenant governor Barbara Snelling

=== Results ===
Republican primary results
Party	Candidate	Votes	%
Republican	Phil Scott	15,981	56.12%
Republican	Mark Snelling	12,389	43.51%
Write-in		105	0.37%
Total votes		28,475	100.00%

== Democratic primary ==
=== Candidates ===
- Steven Howard, Vermont state representative from the Rutland-5-3 district (2005–2011)
- Christopher A. Bray, Vermont state representative from the Addison-5 district (2007–2011)

=== Results ===
Democratic primary results
Party	Candidate	Votes	%
Democratic	Steven Howard	28,479	50.16%
Democratic	Christopher A. Bray	26,328	46.37%
Write-in		1,970	3.47%
Total votes		56,777	100.00%

== General election ==
=== Candidates ===
- Phil Scott, Vermont state senator from the Washington district (2001–2011) (Republican)
- Steven Howard, Vermont state representative from the Rutland-5-3 district (2005–2011) (Democratic)
- Peter R. Garritano, automobile salesman (Independent)
- Marjorie Power, activist (Progressive)
- Boots Wardinski, activist and perennial candidate (Liberty Union)

=== Results ===
2010 Vermont lieutenant gubernatorial election results
Party	Candidate	Votes	%	±%
Republican	Phil Scott	116,198	49.38%	−5.70%
Democratic	Steven Howard	99,843	42.43%	+3.32%
Independent	Peter R. Garritano	8,627	3.67%	N/A
Progressive	Marjorie Power	8,287	3.52%	−1.05%
Liberty Union	Boots Wardinski	2,228	0.95%	−0.22%
Write-in		147	0.06%	-0.01%
Total votes		235,330	100.00%	
Republican hold				
