= Steven Howard (politician) =

American politician

Member of the Vermont House of Representatives from the Rutland-5-3 district
- In office January 2005 – January 2011
- Succeeded by: Herb Russell

Member of the Vermont House of Representatives from the Rutland-4 district
- In office January 1993 – January 1999

Personal details
- Born: August 3, 1971 (age 54) Rutland, Vermont, U.S.
- Party: Democratic

Steven James Howard is an American politician from the state of Vermont. He represented parts of the city of Rutland in the Vermont House of Representatives from 1993 to 2011, except for three terms between 1999 and 2005. A Democrat, he represented the district of Rutland-5-3, and ran unsuccessfully for Lieutenant Governor of Vermont in 2010.

== Biography ==
Howard was born in Rutland, Vermont on August 3, 1971. He was educated at Mt. St. Joseph Academy, a Catholic high school in Rutland, and at Boston College, B.A., 1993.

== Public life ==
=== In the legislature ===
From 1993 to 1999, Howard represented the town of Rutland in the Vermont House of Representatives, serving the district of Rutland-4. From 1995 to 1997 served as chair of the Vermont Democratic Party and was the youngest state political party chair in the nation. During his tenure as party chair while also serving in the Vermont State Legislature, Howard announced publicly that he was gay. He currently serves as one of five openly gay members of the Vermont Legislature, alongside Sen. Ed Flanagan (D-Chittenden County) and representatives Bill Lippert (D-Hinesburg), Suzi Wizowaty (D-Burlington) and Jason Lorber (D-Burlington).

=== Run for lieutenant governor ===
In January 2010, Howard announced his candidacy for the office of Lieutenant Governor in the 2010 elections - the announcement was made on his Facebook page. He won the Democratic primary election held on August 24, 2010. He went on to narrowly lose the general election to Republican Phil Scott.

Party political offices
Preceded by Thomas W. Costello	Democratic nominee for Lieutenant Governor of Vermont; 2010	Succeeded by Cassandra Gekas
