= Bill Aswad =

American politician (1922–2015)

Member of the Vermont House of Representatives from the Chittenden-6-1 district
- In office 1995–2012

Personal details
- Born: William N. Aswad; January 15, 1922 Binghamton, New York, US
- Died: August 13, 2015 (aged 93) Shelburne, Vermont
- Party: Democratic
- Spouse: Marjorie G. Aswad (d. 1998)
- Education: Clarkson University
- Profession: Engineer

William N. Aswad (January 15, 1922 – August 13, 2015) was an American politician who was a member of the Vermont House of Representatives. He was an engineer by profession and manager of manufacturing engineering.

Aswad was born in Binghamton, New York, in 1922. He attended Clarkson University and Union College, graduating the former with a major in chemical engineering in 1946. He was a veteran of World War II, serving in the Army Corps of Engineers, attaining the rank of major. A former city councillor in his hometown of Burlington, was elected to the Vermont House of Representatives in 1995, at the age of 72, and served until his defeat by Joanna E. Cole, a fellow Democrat, in 2012. During his time in the House, he served on the House Transportation Committee. In 2012, he was honored in the House with a resolution on his 90th birthday.

Aswad was a member of United Way and served on the Chittenden County Regional Planning Association, the Vermont Association for Development and Planning, Vermont Health Foundation, and as a president of the New England Association of Regional Councils. He died in Shelburne, Vermont, on August 13, 2015, after a brief illness.

== Electoral history ==
Bill Aswad electoral history

1994 Vermont House of Representatives Chittenden 7-6 district election
Primary election
Party	Candidate	Votes	%
Democratic	Bill Aswad	509	44.92%
Democratic	Carmel Babcock (incumbent)	439	38.75%
Democratic	Arthur E. Merola	175	15.45%
Write-in		10	0.88%
Total votes		1,133	100.00%
General election
Democratic	Bill Aswad	1,657	34.37%
Democratic	Carmel Babcock (incumbent)	1,593	33.04%
Republican	Kurt Wright	1,571	32.59%
Total votes		4,821	100.00%

1996 Vermont House of Representatives Chittenden 7-6 district election
Primary election
Party	Candidate	Votes	%
Democratic	Bill Aswad (incumbent)	304	51.53%
Democratic	Hank Gretkowski	283	47.97%
Write-in		3	0.51%
Total votes		590	100.00%
General election
Democratic	Bill Aswad (incumbent)	1,902	31.83%
Democratic	Hank Gretkowski	1,873	31.35%
Republican	Dianne M. Deforge	1,463	24.49%
Republican	Eugene Shaver	732	12.25%
Write-in		5	0.84%
Total votes		5,975	100.00%

1998 Vermont House of Representatives Chittenden 7-6 district election
Primary election
Party	Candidate	Votes	%
Democratic	Bill Aswad (incumbent)	207	50.74%
Democratic	Henry J. Gretkowski	201	49.26%
Total votes		408	100.00%
General election
Democratic	Bill Aswad (incumbent)	2,074	50.43%
Democratic	Henry J. Gretkowski	1,965	47.78%
Write-in		74	1.80%
Total votes		4,113	100.00%

2000 Vermont House of Representatives Chittenden 7-6 district election
Primary election
Party	Candidate	Votes	%
Democratic	Bill Aswad (incumbent)	535	46.52%
Democratic	Dennis McBee	311	27.04%
Democratic	Jill K. Malin	287	24.96%
Write-in		17	1.48%
Total votes		1,150	100.00%
General election
Republican	Kurt Wright	1,863	28.63%
Democratic	Bill Aswad (incumbent)	1,851	28.45%
Republican	Matt Gardy	1,432	22.01%
Democratic	Dennis McBee	1,349	20.73%
Write-in		12	1.84%
Total votes		6,507	100.00%

2002 Vermont House of Representatives Chittenden 3-1 district election
Primary election
Party	Candidate	Votes	%
Democratic	Jennifer B. Wallace-Brodeur	317	49.38%
Democratic	Bill Aswad (incumbent)	315	49.07%
Write-in		10	1.56%
Total votes		642	100.00%
	Blank/Spoiled	66	
General election
Republican	Kurt Wright (incumbent)	1,687	29.91%
Democratic	Bill Aswad (incumbent)	1,595	28.28%
Democratic	Jennifer Wallace-Brodeur	1,400	24.82%
Republican	Gene Shaver	952	16.88%
Write-in		6	0.11%
Total votes		5,640	100.00%

2004 Vermont House of Representatives Chittenden 3-1 district election
Primary election
Party	Candidate	Votes	%
Democratic	Bill Aswad (incumbent)	418	50.85%
Democratic	Russell Ellis	399	48.54%
Write-in		5	0.61%
Total votes		822	100.00%
General election
Republican	Kurt Wright (incumbent)	2,117	29.94%
Democratic	Bill Aswad (incumbent)	2,066	29.22%
Democratic	Russell Ellis	1,687	23.86%
Republican	Gene Shaver	1,185	16.76%
Write-in		15	0.21%
Total votes		7,070	100.00%

2006 Vermont House of Representatives Chittenden 3-1 district election
Primary election
Party	Candidate	Votes	%
Democratic	Bill Aswad (incumbent)	690	92.25%
Write-in		58	7.75%
Total votes		748	100.00%
General election
Republican	Kurt Wright (incumbent)	1,778	28.56%
Democratic	Bill Aswad (incumbent)	1,764	28.33%
Democratic	Susan Wheeler	1,183	19.00%
Republican	Gene Shaver	785	12.61%
Independent	Ellie Blais	709	11.39%
Write-in		7	0.11%
Total votes		6,226	100.00%

2008 Vermont House of Representatives Chittenden 3-1 district election
Primary election
Party	Candidate	Votes	%
Democratic	Bill Aswad (incumbent)	342	42.48%
Democratic	Joanna Cole	234	29.07%
Democratic	Susan Wheeler	227	28.20%
Write-in		2	0.25%
Total votes		805	100.00%
General election
Republican	Kurt Wright (incumbent)	2,196	32.57%
Democratic	Bill Aswad (incumbent)	2,195	32.56%
Democratic	Joanna Cole	1,649	24.46%
Republican	Scott Beaudin	694	10.29%
Write-in		8	0.12%
Total votes		6,742	100.00%

2010 Vermont House of Representatives Chittenden 3-1 district election
Primary election
Party	Candidate	Votes	%
Democratic	Bill Aswad (incumbent)	843	50.97%
Democratic	Joanna Cole	800	48.37%
Write-in		11	0.67%
Total votes		1,654	100.00%
	Blank/Spoiled	668	
General election
Republican	Kurt Wright (incumbent)	1,806	39.18%
Democratic	Bill Aswad (incumbent)	1,526	33.11%
Democratic	Joanna Cole	1,277	27.71%
Total votes		4,609	100.00%

2012 Vermont House of Representatives Chittenden 6-1 district election
Primary election
Party	Candidate	Votes	%
Democratic	Joanna Cole	658	36.04%
Democratic	Bill Aswad (incumbent)	619	33.90%
Democratic	Robert Hooper	536	29.35%
Write-in		13	0.71%
Total votes		1,826	100.00%
	Blank/Spoiled	568	
General election
Republican	Kurt Wright (incumbent)	2,332	36.86%
Democratic	Joanna Cole	2,008	31.74%
Democratic	Bill Aswad (incumbent)	1,987	31.41%
Total votes		6,327	100.00%
