= Youth pride =

Youth movement

Youth pride, an extension of the Gay pride and LGBT social movements, promotes equality amongst young members (usually above the age of consent) of the Lesbian, Gay, Bisexual, Transgender, Intersex, and Queer (LGBTIQ+) community. The movement exists in many countries and focuses mainly on festivals and parades, enabling many LGBTIQ+ youth to network, communicate, and celebrate their gender and sexual identities.

== Background ==
Gay and lesbian youth bear an increased risk of suicide, substance abuse, school problems, and isolation because of a "hostile and condemning environment, verbal and physical abuse, rejection and isolation from family and peers". Further, LGBTIQ+ youths are more likely to report psychological and physical abuse by parents or caretakers, and more sexual abuse. Suggested reasons for this disparity are that (1) LGBTIQ+ youths may be specifically targeted on the basis of their perceived sexual orientation or gender non-conforming appearance, and (2) "risk factors associated with sexual minority status, including discrimination, invisibility, and rejection by family members...may lead to an increase in behaviors that are associated with risk for victimization, such as substance abuse, sex with multiple partners, or running away from home as a teenager." A 2008 study showed a correlation between the degree of rejecting behavior by parents of LGBTIQ+ adolescents and negative health problems in the teenagers studied. Crisis centers in larger cities and information sites on the Internet have arisen to help youth and adults. The Trevor Helpline, a suicide prevention helpline for LGBTIQ+ youth, was established by the filmmakers following the 1998 airing on HBO of the Academy Award winning short film Trevor; Daniel Radcliffe donated a large sum to the group and has appeared in service ads for them condemning homophobia.

According to a 2007 report "of the estimated 1.6 million homeless American youth, between 20 and 40 percent identify as lesbian, gay, bisexual or transgender.

== Overview ==
Youth Pride organizers point to the value in building community and supporting young people as they are more likely to get gay bashed and bullied. Schools that have a Gay-Straight Alliance (GSA) handle issues of discrimination and violence against LGBTIQ+ youth better than schools that do not because they help develop community and coping skills and give students a safe-space to get health and safety information. Sometimes the groups avoid labelling young people and instead let them identify themselves on their own terms "when they feel safe".

At larger pride parades and festivals there are often LGBTIQ+ or queer youth contingents, and some festivals designate safe-spaces for young people to provide safety and security.

== List of youth pride events ==
- The increasing mainstream acceptance of the greater LGBTIQ+ communities prompted the Massachusetts Governors' Commission on Gay and Lesbian Youth to start an annual Gay-Straight Youth Pride observance in 1995.
- In 1997 the Youth Pride Alliance was founded as a non-profit to put on an annual youth pride event in Washington, D.C. In 1998 Candace Gingrich was one of the speakers at Washington D.C.'s Youth Pride Alliance, a coalition of 25 youth support and advocacy groups.
- In 1999, the first annual Vermont Youth Pride Day was held. As of 2009 it is the largest queer and allied youth event in Vermont and is organized by Outright Vermont to "break the geographic and social barriers gay youngsters living in rural communities face".
- In 2002, a college fair was added to the event to connect students with colleges and discuss issues relating to how to track students and ensure their safety.
- In April 2003 a Youth Pride Chorus partly organized with New York's LGBT Community Center started rehearsals and later performed at a June Pride concert at Carnegie Hall with the New York City Gay Men's Chorus.
- In 2004 the San Diego chapter of Gay, Lesbian and Straight Education Network (GLSEN) worked with the San Diego Youth Pride coordinators to organize the Day of Silence throughout the county.
- In 2005, the Decatur Georgia Youth Pride participated in a counter-protest against Westboro Baptist Church, led by church head Fred Phelps' daughter, Shirley Phelps-Roper, who were "greeting students and faculty as they arrived with words such as "God hates fag enablers" and "Thank God for 9/11" at ten locations.
- In 2008, Chicago's Youth Pride Center, primarily serving "LGBT youth of color", opened a temporary location and will move into their newly constructed building on Chicago's South Side in 2010.
- In 2009, Utah Pride Center held an event to coincide with Youth Pride Walk 2009, a "cross-country walk by two Utah women trying to draw attention to the problems faced by homeless LGBT youth".
- In August 2010, the first Hollywood Youth Pride was held with a focus on the "large number of homeless LGBT youth living on Los Angeles streets."
