= Rutland-5-2 Vermont Representative District, 2002–2012 =

American legislative district

Coordinates: 43°36′10″N 72°57′40″W

The Rutland-5-2 Representative District is a one-member state Representative district in the U.S. state of Vermont. It is one of the 108 one or two-member districts into which the state was divided by the redistricting and reapportionment plan developed by the Vermont General Assembly following the 2000 U.S. census. The plan applies to legislatures elected in 2002, 2004, 2006, 2008, and 2010. A new plan will be developed in 2012 following the 2010 U.S. census.

The Rutland-5-2 District includes a section of the Rutland County city of Rutland defined as follows:

That portion of the City of Rutland encompassed within a boundary beginning at the point where the boundary line of Rutland City and Rutland Town intersects with South Main Street, then northerly along the easterly side of the centerline of South Main Street to the intersection of South Main Street and Strongs Avenue, then northwesterly along the east side of the centerline of Strongs Avenue to the intersection of Strongs Avenue and Prospect Street, then northerly along the east side of the centerline of Prospect Street to the intersection of Prospect Street and Washington Street, then easterly along the south side of the centerline of Washington Street to the intersection of Washington Street and Court Street, then northerly along the east side of the centerline of Court Street to the intersection of Court Street and West Street, then easterly along the south side of the centerline of West Street, to the intersection of West Street and South Main Street, then east across South Main Street, to the intersection of South Main Street and Terrill Street, then easterly along the south side of the centerline of Terrill Street to the intersection of Terrill Street and Lafayette Street, then southerly along the west side of the centerline of Lafayette Street to the intersection of Lafayette Street and Easterly Avenue, then easterly along the south side of the centerline of Easterly Avenue to the intersection of Easterly Avenue and Piedmont Drive, then easterly along the south side of the centerline of Piedmont Drive to the intersection of Piedmont Drive and Piedmont Parkway, then easterly along the south side of the centerline of Piedmont Parkway to the intersection of Piedmont Parkway and Stratton Road, then southerly along the west side of the centerline of Stratton Road to the intersection of Stratton Road and Killington Avenue, then easterly along the south side of the centerline of Killington Avenue to the boundary of Rutland City and Rutland Town, then southerly along the city line to the intersection of the city line and South Main Street to the point of beginning.

— Vermont Statutes, Title 17, Chapter 34, Section 1893a,

The rest of the city of Rutland is in Rutland-5-1, Rutland-5-3, and Rutland-5-4.

As of the 2000 census, the state as a whole had a population of 608,827. As there are a total of 150 representatives, there were 4,059 residents per representative (or 8,118 residents per two representatives). The one member Rutland-5-2 District had a population of 4,310 in that same census, 6.18% above the state average.

== District representative ==
- Thomas S. DePoy, Republican

== See also ==
- Members of the Vermont House of Representatives, 2005-2006 session
- Vermont Representative Districts, 2002-2012
