= Ron Squires =

American politician

Member of the Vermont House of Representatives from the Windham-5 district
- In office January 1991 – January 1993

Personal details
- Born: November 9, 1951
- Died: January 8, 1993 (aged 41) Brattleboro, Vermont
- Party: Democratic

Ronald M. Squires (November 9, 1951 – January 8, 1993), commonly known as Ron Squires, was an American politician from Vermont. A Democrat, he served two years in the Vermont House of Representatives, representing Guilford, Vernon and part of Brattleboro from 1991 until his death.

== Biography ==
An eighth-generation Vermonter, Squires was elected in 1990 as Vermont's first openly gay legislator. In the general election held on November 6, 1990, he defeated Republican incumbent Sam Hunt by 38 votes. He was re-elected unopposed in 1992 but died just days after being sworn in for his second term in January 1993. Squires died from viral meningitis, an AIDS-related illness. He had served five years on the Democratic National Committee.
