= Kevin Scully (Vermont politician) =

American politician

Member of the Vermont House of Representatives from the Chittenden-18 district
- Incumbent
- Assumed office April 16, 2026
- Preceded by: Robert Hooper

Personal details
- Party: Democratic

Kevin Scully is an American politician who has served as a member of the Vermont House of Representatives since 2026, representing Chittenden-18. He was appointed to the chamber by governor Phil Scott after the resignation of Robert Hooper.
