= Rutland-5-3 Vermont Representative District, 2002–2012 =

Coordinates: 43°35′50″N 72°59′10″W

The Rutland-5-3 Representative District is a one-member state Representative district in the U.S. state of Vermont. It is one of the 108 one or two member districts into which the state was divided by the redistricting and reapportionment plan developed by the Vermont General Assembly following the 2000 U.S. census. The plan applies to legislatures elected in 2002, 2004, 2006, 2008, and 2010. A new plan will be developed in 2012 following the 2010 U.S. census.

The Rutland-5-3 District includes a section of the Rutland County city of Rutland defined as follows:

That portion of the City of Rutland encompassed within a boundary beginning at the point where the boundary line of Rutland City and Rutland Town intersects with South Main Street, then northerly along the west side of the centerline of South Main Street to the intersection of South Main Street and Strongs Avenue, then northwesterly along the west side of the centerline of Strongs Avenue to the intersection of Strongs Avenue and Prospect Street, then northerly along the west side of the centerline of Prospect Street to the intersection of Prospect Street and Washington Street, then easterly along the north side of the centerline of Washington Street to the intersection of Washington Street and Court Street, then northerly along the west side of the centerline of Court Street to the intersection of Court Street and West Street, then easterly along the north side of the centerline of West Street to the intersection of West Street and Lincoln Avenue, then northerly along the west side of the centerline of Lincoln Avenue to the intersection of Lincoln Avenue and Williams Street, then west along the south side of the centerline of Williams Street to the intersection of Williams Street and Grove Street, then north along the west side of the centerline of Grove Street to the intersection of Grove Street and Maple Street, then west along the south side of the centerline of Maple Street to the intersection of Maple Street and Pine Street, then south along the east side of the centerline of Pine Street to the intersection of Pine Street and Robbins Street, then west along the south side of the centerline of Robbins Street to the intersection of Robbins Street and Baxter Street, then south along the east side of the centerline of Baxter Street to the intersection of Baxter Street and State Street, then west along the south side of the centerline of State Street to the intersection of State Street and Cramton Avenue, then south along the east side of the centerline of Cramton Avenue to the intersection of Cramton Avenue and West Street, then westerly along the south side of the centerline of West Street to the intersection of Ripley Road, then southerly along the Rutland City-Rutland Town line to the intersection of the city line and South Main Street, the point of beginning.

— Vermont Statutes, Title 17, Chapter 34, Section 1893a

The rest of the city of Rutland is in Rutland-5-1, Rutland-5-2, and Rutland-5-4.

As of the 2000 census, the state as a whole had a population of 608,827. As there are a total of 150 representatives, there were 4,059 residents per representative (or 8,118 residents per two representatives). The one member Rutland-5-3 District had a population of 4,314 in that same census, 6.28% above the state average.

== District representative ==
- Steven Howard, Democrat

== See also ==
- Members of the Vermont House of Representatives, 2005-2006 session
- Vermont Representative Districts, 2002-2012
