= Bill Lippert =

American politician (born 1950)

William J. Lippert, Jr.
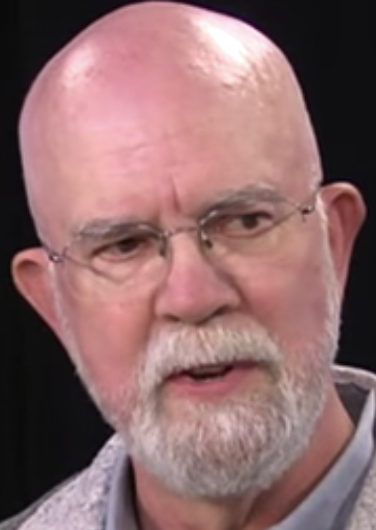
- Lippert in 2018

Member of the Vermont House of Representatives from the Chittenden-4-2 district
- In office April 13, 1994 – 2022
- Preceded by: Chuck Ross
- Succeeded by: Phil Pouech

Personal details
- Born: January 18, 1950 (age 76) Port Trevorton, Pennsylvania, U.S.
- Party: Democratic
- Spouse: Enrique Peredo

William J. Lippert Jr., commonly known as Bill Lippert, is a former legislator and gay rights activist from the U.S. state of Vermont. He served 29 years in the Vermont House of Representatives as state representative of the Town of Hinesburg, from 1994 to 2022. He served as chair of the House Judiciary Committee for ten years, and then served as chair of the House Health Care Committee.

== Early life and career ==
Lippert grew up in Port Trevorton, Pennsylvania and graduated from Earlham College in 1972 with a B.A. in history. Lippert attended Antioch/New England Graduate School, and graduated in 1979 with an M.A. in Counseling Psychology. He has lived in Vermont since 1972, and moved to Hinesburg in 1979.

In the early 1970s, he helped form the state's first gay men's support group and, in 1983, Lippert worked with others to organize Vermont's first gay pride rally in Burlington. In 1989, Lippert helped to establish Outright Vermont, an organization dedicated to serving the needs of lesbian, gay, bisexual, and transgender youth. Later, he was involved in lobbying for Vermont's gay civil rights bill, which passed the legislature and was signed into law by Governor Howard Dean in 1992.

In 1992, along with community activist David Curtis, Lippert founded the Samara Foundation of Vermont, an LGBT community foundation whose mission was "to improve the quality of life of Vermont's lesbian, gay, bisexual and transgender citizens." Lippert served as the executive director of the Samara Foundation, and later as senior foundation officer. Samara Foundation is now the Samara Fund for LGBT Issues of the Vermont Community Foundation.

For twenty years prior to serving in the Vermont legislature, Lippert worked in community mental health services, serving as a psychotherapist and substance abuse counselor, and for ten years as the executive director of the Counseling Service of Addison County. In 1996, Lippert resigned as CSAC Executive Director to continue his legislative career and grow the Samara Foundation of Vermont.

== In the legislature ==
=== Appointment and re-election ===
In April, 1994, Lippert was appointed by Governor Howard Dean to fill a vacant seat representing Hinesburg in the Vermont House of Representatives. The seat had been held by Democrat Chuck Ross, who resigned on being appointed U.S. Sen. Patrick Leahy's state director. Lippert was elected to a full term in Nov., 1994 and was re-elected biennially until he retired from the legislature in 2022.

=== Same-sex unions ===
In the year 2000, as the vice chair of the House Judiciary Committee, and as the General Assembly's only openly gay member, Lippert was central to the work of drafting and passing into law the landmark Vermont civil union law which granted legal recognition to same gender couples. Following passage of the civil union law, the Vermont Democratic Party faced a backlash and lost its majority in the House. Subsequently, Lippert lost his position as vice chair of the Judiciary Committee, though he easily won re-election to his seat in the House.

Following the 2004 election, the Democrats regained their House majority and Lippert was appointed to chair the Judiciary Committee by House Speaker Gaye Symington.

In 2006, Lippert was the lead sponsor of the Transgender Non-discrimination Bill in the House. Work on this bill had been postponed in 2000 following the December, 1999 VT Supreme Court's Baker v. State decision, which unexpectedly sent the debate for same-sex marriage to the Vermont legislature for resolution. Despite passage by the House and the Senate, Gov. Jim Douglas vetoed the Transgender Non-discrimination legislation. Lippert sponsored this civil rights bill again in 2007, ultimately securing passage and signature by Gov. Douglas, following minor changes to the bill.

In 2009, Lippert chaired the House hearings on full Marriage Equality, and led its successful passage by the House on a vote of 94–52. Despite strong votes and passage by both the Senate (26–4) and the House (94–52), Gov. Jim Douglas vetoed the Marriage Equality bill on April 6, 2009. In Vermont, overriding a governor's veto requires a two thirds majority, not a simple majority of fifty percent. On April 7, 2009, the Senate overrode the veto on a vote of 23–5. Lippert worked with House leadership to marshall enough House votes, and the House followed suit, overriding the governor's veto 100–49. As a result, full Marriage Equality became Vermont law on April 7, 2009, with marriages taking place beginning on September 1, 2009.

Lippert continued to serve as chair of the House Judiciary Committee through 2014. In 2015, Lippert was appointed by House Speaker Shap Smith to chair the House Health Care Committee.

Lippert's legislative work to achieve Civil Unions in 2000 was prominently featured in Civil Wars: A Battle for Gay Marriage - David Moats, Harcourt, Inc., 2004. Editorial Page Editor of the Rutland Herald, Moats received the 2001 Pulitzer Prize for his 2000 editorial series covering the Civil Unions controversy in Vermont.

We Do!: American Leaders Who Believe in Marriage Equality - Madeleine Kunin & Jennifer Baumgardner, Editors, 2013 featured Lippert's April 15, 2000 Civil Unions speech on the House floor in its anthology of marriage equality speeches and interviews.

Freedom & Unity: The Vermont Movie, Part Four, "Doers and Shapers," Nora Jacobson, 2013, presents "institutions and people who push boundaries" - including Rep. Ron Squires, Vermont's first openly gay legislator, and Lippert's involvement in the Vermont gay rights movement.

The documentary film, The State of Marriage (Jeff Kaufman, Director/Producer), which premiered June 2015, also features Lippert's work from 2000 - 2009 for same-sex marriage in the Vermont legislature.

=== Blood Alcohol Limit ===
Lippert has also notably advocated for "Driving Under the Influence" to be set at a blood alcohol content of 0.05%, roughly two drinks within one hour for a 150-pound person. Passage would make Vermont the most restrictive state in the US with respect to BAC limits. Lippert introduced a bill in 2013, which has not become law.

=== The O'Reilly Factor ===
On May 12, 2007, Lippert received national attention when a Fox News crew, on behalf of the program The O'Reilly Factor, interrupted his breakfast in the Vermont statehouse cafeteria to demand why he had supported transgender rights but did not support Jessica's Law, for which host Bill O'Reilly is an advocate. Fox News: "Rep. Lippert, why do you care more about transgender rights than the safety of Vermont's children?" Lippert was a central figure in passing similar child protection legislation earlier that same week. Ultimately, the Fox News crew was escorted out of the statehouse by security. The exchange was broadcast on Fox News on May 14, 2007 (resulting in hundreds of hateful emails to Lippert from all across the country). Later that day, in response to the incident, fellow lawmakers honored Lippert in the well of the House with a standing ovation.

== Personal ==
Lippert served as one of six openly gay members of the Vermont Legislature.

Lippert is married (2009) to his spouse, Enrique S. Peredo Jr. of Toto, Guam. They live together in Hinesburg, Vermont.
