= Carol Ode =

American politician and member of the Vermont State House of Representatives

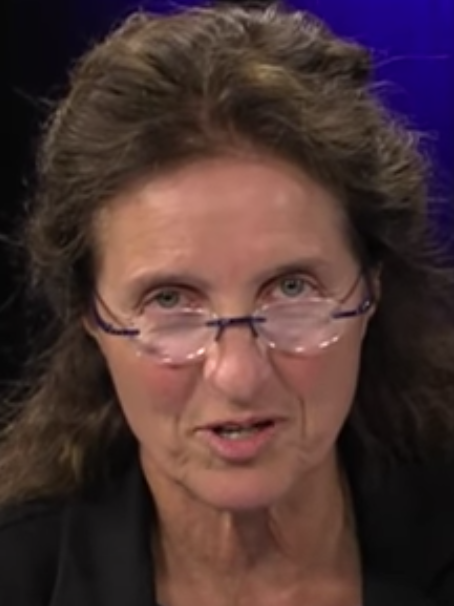
- Ode in 2018

Member of the Vermont House of Representatives from the Chittenden 6-1 district
- Incumbent
- Assumed office 2017

Personal details
- Party: Democratic
- Education: University of Vermont (BA); Cornell Law School

Carol Ode is an American politician who has served in the Vermont House of Representatives since 2017.
