= Outright Vermont =

Queer youth organisation in Vermont

Outright Vermont is Vermont's only queer youth service organization. Its mission is to build a Vermont where all LGBTQ+ (gay, lesbian, bisexual, transgender, queer, and questioning) youth have hope, equity and power.

== Theory of Change ==
Outright uses a "theory of change" based in three main branches of service: Develop Self and Peer Connections, Strengthen Families, and Transform Communities.

== Queer Youth Space & Statewide Education Work ==
Outright Vermont is one of the oldest queer youth organizations in the United States, founded in 1989. Since their start, they have hosted an adult-facilitated weekly queer (LGBTQ or lesbian, gay, bisexual, queer & questioning) youth group in Burlington on Friday nights. They have also had outpost youth groups in Montpelier, Morrisville, Middlebury, Rutland, Brattleboro, and St. Albans. They also offer workshops and presentations on queer identity, anti-harassment training, and how to start Queer/Straight Alliance student clubs for Vermont schools. In 2011, they presented to nearly 4,000 students and educators across the state, in over 250 presentations.

== Homophobic Backlash Against Outright VT Programs ==
In 1998, then Governor Howard Dean granted Department of Education (DOE) funding for Outright's work with schools on anti-bullying trainings. Then, in 2000, Dean cut the DOE funding due to anti-Civil Unions backlash. The funding was not restored until 2012, by Governor Peter Shumlin and even this funding was at a fraction of the original grant. During the Vermont Civil Unions debates of 1999 and 2000, Outright Vermont became a target from external and internal Vermont anti-gay groups, including personal threats to the staff and vicious public accusations about the organizations work with young people. In 2000, the Civil Unions bill was signed into law in Vermont. In 2002, Barre City Elementary and Middle School school board voted to deny the posting of "safe zone" cards from Outright Vermont in the school. These cards designated a teacher or staff member as a "safe" person to talk to about coming out as LGBTQ. In 2006, Outright Vermont's scheduled presentations at Williston Central School were met with a small, but vocal anti-gay parent protest and large community meeting to discuss the content of the anti-harassment trainings. After overwhelming support for Outright Vermont's workshops, school officials kept the workshops as scheduled. In 2007, Missquoi Valley Union high school in Swanton had a similar community reaction to scheduled presentations and after a heated public school board meeting, the board agreed to keep the workshops as scheduled.

== Vermont Legislative Work ==
In 2004, Outright Vermont was instrumental in passing Vermont's first anti-bullying legislation. In 2007, they led the effort in testifying before the Vermont legislature to pass one of the country's first gender identity bill, including "gender identity" as a protected category in all state law. In 2012, Outright Vermont worked closely with the Vermont Human Rights Commission to advocate for the strengthening of the Vermont anti-harassment legislation.

== Organizational Milestones & New Programs ==
In 2005, Outright Vermont received a three-year $100,000 grant for statewide education work from the Queer Youth Fund, of the Liberty Hill Fund. In 2009 the group sponsored Gendertopia, a nine-week afterschool program to explore who gender and sexualities are represented in popular culture. In 2009 they also started the first statewide effort to ensure every "middle and high schools offer genderless bathrooms". In 2011, Outright Vermont, in partnership with the YWCA, established Vermont's first queer youth summer camp, Camp Outright. In its first year, the camp drew 40 campers from around the United States and in its second year, double that many.

In addition to Camp Outright and Friday Night Group, as of February 2022, Outright offers online and in-person social and support programming for LGBTQ+ and allied youth through their teens, as well as a virtual support group for parents and caregivers of transgender, nonbinary, and gender nonconforming youth and a monthly meetup for families with gender creative children 12 and under.
