= List of City Council members of Ann Arbor, Michigan =

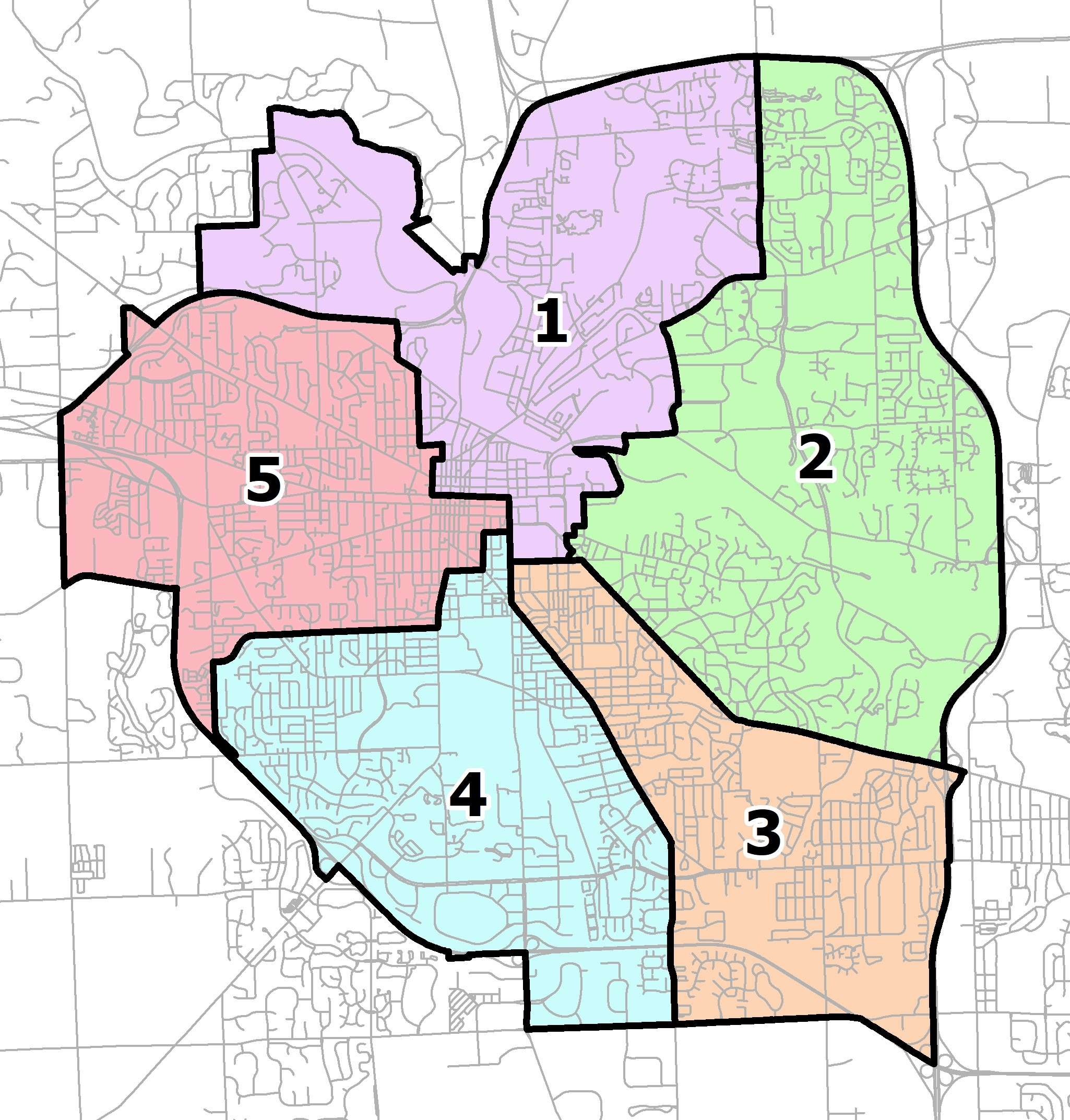
Map of the five wards of Ann Arbor, Michigan

The Ann Arbor City Council is the legislative body of Ann Arbor, Michigan. The council consists of the Mayor and ten council members. The city is divided into five geographic wards, with each ward represented by two council members serving staggered terms. Prior to the adoption of a new city charter in 1956, representatives for the wards were designated as aldermen. Following the 1956 charter modernization, the title was officially changed to councilmember. This list only covers councilmembers who have served since the adoption of the new city charter.

The tradition of dual representation per ward dates back to the city's early governance. The original 1851 city charter incorporated Ann Arbor into four wards, represented by an eight-member common council. A subsequent 1889 charter expanded the city but continued the dual-alderman tradition. When the modern city charter was adopted in 1956, it restructured the city into its current five-ward system but retained the staggered two-seat model.

For decades under the 1956 charter, council members served two-year terms. To maintain staggered representation, one seat in each ward was contested in even-numbered years, while the other seat was contested in odd-numbered years. (Due to occasional mid-term resignations and special elections, the odd/even alignment of specific seats occasionally shifted historically, but generally stabilized in the modern era).

In November 2016, Ann Arbor voters approved Proposal 1, a city charter amendment transitioning all city council seats to four-year terms. To align local races with higher-turnout state and national elections, the transition eliminated odd-year elections. Starting with the 2018 cycle, elections for the staggered seats were consolidated to be held exclusively in even-numbered years. Currently, half the council is elected during presidential election years, and the other half is elected during midterm (gubernatorial) election years.

== City Council Wards ==
Ann Arbor is divided into five geographic wards, each represented by two city council members serving staggered four-year terms.

=== Ward Boundaries Overview ===
- Ward 1: Covers the northern portions of the city.
- Ward 2: Covers the northeastern and eastern and sections.
- Ward 3: Covers the southeast of the city.
- Ward 4: Covers the south-central southwestern areas.
- Ward 5: Covers the western wedge.

== Ward 1 ==
=== Gubernatorial-year seat (historically even-year seat) ===
| Name | Party | Term of Office | Notes |
|---|---|---|---|
| John L. Teachout | Republican | 1955–1958 | Elected as First Ward Alderman in 1955; continued on council following the 1956 charter adoption |
| Richard Dennard | Democratic | 1958–1962 | |
| Eunice L. Burns | Democratic | 1962–1968 | Ran for Mayor in 1965 while continuing on council |
| Richard D. Remington | Democratic | 1968–1970 | |
| John P. Kirscht | Democratic | 1970–1972 | |
| Jerry DeGrieck | Human Rights | 1972–1974 | Elected as a 22-year-old student; became one of the first openly gay elected officials in the US |
| Colleen McGee | Democratic | 1974–1978 | Narrowly defeated HRP candidate S. Beth Brunton by 101 votes to win the seat |
| Lowell Peterson | Democratic | 1978–1982 | |
| Larry Hunter | Democratic | 1982–1994 | Unseated incumbent Earl Greene; prominent Black Panther and social activist |
| Patricia Vereen-Dixon | Democratic | 1994–2000 | Formerly named Pat Byrd |
| Kim Groome | Democratic | 2000–2005 | Resigned mid-term in September 2005 |
| John Roberts | Democratic | 2005–2006 | Appointed to fill Kim Groome's vacancy |
| Ron Suarez | Democratic | 2006–2008 | Defeated John Roberts in the 2006 primary |
| Sandi Smith | Democratic | 2008–2012 | |
| Sumi Kailasapathy | Democratic | 2012–2018 | Did not seek re-election in 2018 |
| Jeff Hayner | Democratic | 2018–2022 | Survived a 2021 recall petition attempt after organizers failed to collect sufficient signatures |
| Cynthia Harrison | Democratic | 2022–present | Defeated Angeline Smith with 71% of the vote in the 2022 primary to succeed Jeff Hayner |

=== Presidential-year seat (historically odd-year seat) ===
| Name | Party | Term of Office | Notes |
|---|---|---|---|
| M. Alicia Dwyer | Democratic | 1957–1959 | Later M. Alicia Dwyer Pratt; initiated the creation of the official Ann Arbor city flag |
| Harold J. McKercher | Republican | 1959–1961 | Ann Arbor real estate and insurance agent |
| Lynn W. Eley | Democratic | 1961–1963 | University of Michigan professor who later relocated to Wisconsin and served as Mayor of Mequon |
| John D. Teachout | Democratic | 1963–1965 | Blinded during WWII service; later owned Idiom Recording Company and was an active local musician |
| H. C. Curry | Democratic | 1965–1971 | |
| Norris J. Thomas Jr. | Democratic | 1971–1975 | Legal Aid Society attorney |
| Elizabeth "Liz" Keogh | Democratic | 1975–1977 | Elected with a 45% plurality in 1975 |
| Kenneth T. Latta | Democratic | 1977–1981 | Championed downtown zoning and adult business controls |
| Ann Marie Coleman | Democratic | 1981–1993 | |
| Tobi Hanna-Davies | Democratic | 1993–1999 | Co-chaired the City's Affordable Housing Commission during her tenure |
| John Hieftje | Democratic | 1999–2000 | Resigned mid-term after being elected Mayor of Ann Arbor in 2000 |
| Robert M. Johnson | Democratic | 2000–2007 | Appointed to succeed John Hieftje in 2000 |
| Sabra Briere | Democratic | 2007–2016 | Resigned mid-term in 2016 to relocate out of state |
| Jason Frenzel | Democratic | 2016–2017 | Appointed in December 2016 to complete Sabra Briere's term |
| Anne Bannister | Democratic | 2017–2020 | Unsuccessfully ran for Mayor of Ann Arbor in the 2022 Democratic primary |
| Lisa Disch | Democratic | 2020–present | Unseated incumbent Anne Bannister with 68% of the vote in the 2020 primary |

== Ward 2 ==
=== Presidential-year seat (historically odd-year seat) ===
| Name | Party | Term of Office | Notes |
|---|---|---|---|
| Clan Crawford Jr. | Republican | 1957–1959 | |
| Florence R. Crane | Republican | 1959–1961 | Transitioned to the even-year seat in 1961 |
| Lloyd M. Ives | Democratic | 1961–1961 | Ran as the Democratic candidate for Mayor of Ann Arbor in 1959 |
| William E. "Ted" Bandemer | Republican | 1961–1965 | |
| O. William Habel | Republican | 1965–1968 | General Motors executive who also served as Mayor Pro Tem during his tenure |
| Ernest L. Quenon | Democratic | 1968–1970 | |
| Robert E. "Bob" Weaver | Republican | 1970–1974 | Upset incumbent Ernest Quenon in 1970 |
| Carol Jones | Democratic | 1974–1977 | Defeated HRP challenges to hold the seat for Democrats |
| Susan J. Greenberg | Democratic | 1977–1981 | |
| M. Terry Martin | Republican | 1980–1988 | |
| Ingrid Sheldon | Republican | 1988–1993 | Left her Ward 2 seat after being elected Mayor of Ann Arbor in 1993 |
| Jane Lumm | Republican | 1993–1998 | |
| Joe Upton | Republican | 1998–2001 | |
| Michael Reid | Republican | 2001–2005 | Remained on the Local Development Finance Authority after his tenure |
| Stephen Rapundalo | Democratic | 2005–2011 | Switched from Republican to Democratic in 2005; unseated in a close race by Jane Lumm in 2011 |
| Jane Lumm | Independent | 2011–2020 | Returned to council as an independent |
| Linh Song | Democratic | 2020–2024 | Unseated incumbent Jane Lumm in the August 2020 Democratic primary with 60% of the vote |
| Jon Mallek | Democratic | 2024–present | Ran unopposed in the August 2024 Democratic primary to succeed Linh Song |

=== Gubernatorial-year seat (historically even-year seat) ===
| Name | Party | Term of Office | Notes |
|---|---|---|---|
| Douglas D. Crary | Republican | 1956–1961 | |
| Florence R. Crane | Republican | 1961–1962 | Previously held the odd-year seat |
| John Dowson | Republican | 1962–1966 | |
| Robert G. Faber | Democratic | 1966–1972 | Served during the Harris administration |
| Nancy Wechsler | Human Rights | 1972–1974 | Came out as lesbian while in office, becoming one of the first openly gay public officials in the U.S. |
| Kathy Kozachenko | Human Rights | 1974–1976 | Succeeded Nancy Wechsler; became the first openly gay person to successfully win an election to public office in the United States |
| Earl E. Greene | Democratic | 1976–1980 | Active on council committees regarding local funding and programs |
| James L. Blow | Republican | 1980–1982 | |
| Leslie Morris | Democratic | 1982–1986 | Ran for the Democratic Mayoral nomination in 1984 |
| Dick Deem | Republican | 1986–1990 | |
| David Kwan | Republican | 1990–1995 | |
| Peter Fink | Republican | 1995–2000 | |
| Joan Lowenstein | Democratic | 2000–2008 | Ran for district judge instead of seeking re-election in 2008 |
| Tony Derezinski | Democratic | 2008–2012 | |
| Kirk Westphal | Democratic | 2013–2019 | Won the 2014 Democratic primary with 59% of the vote against Nancy Kaplan; ultimately unseated in the 2018 primary |
| Kathy Griswold | Democratic | 2018–2022 | Unseated incumbent Kirk Westphal in the 2018 Democratic primary by a margin of just 53 votes (50.5% to 49.5%) |
| Chris Watson | Democratic | 2022–present | Ran unopposed in the August 2022 Democratic primary to succeed Kathy Griswold |

== Ward 3 ==
=== Gubernatorial-year seat (historically even-year seat) ===
| Name | Party | Term of Office | Notes |
|---|---|---|---|
| Russell J. Burns | Republican | 1952–1960 | Elected as Third Ward Alderman; became the city's first Mayor Pro Tem under the 1956 charter |
| Robert E. Meader | Republican | 1960–1964 | |
| Robert P. Weeks | Democratic | 1964–1968 | U-M professor; later chaired the Ann Arbor Housing Commission |
| Nicholas D. Kazarinoff | Democratic | 1968–1971 | U-M mathematics professor |
| Nelson Meade | Democratic | 1971–1974 | Later became a prominent local Parks Commissioner |
| Roger Bertoia | Republican | 1974–1978 | Won the Ward 3 seat in the 1974 elections against Democrat Daniel Burke |
| Clifford G. Sheldon | Republican | 1978–1982 | Successfully ran unopposed for his second term in April 1980 |
| Raphael S. Ezekiel | Democratic | 1982–1984 | U-M psychology professor and local civil rights advocate |
| Seth I. Hirshorn | Democratic | 1984–1988 | |
| Elizabeth Brater | Democratic | 1988–1991 | Resigned her Ward 3 seat after being elected Ann Arbor's first female Mayor in 1991 |
| Robert C. Grady | Democratic | 1991–1994 | |
| Haldon L. Smith | Democratic | 1994–1996 | |
| Jean Carlberg | Democratic | 1996–2006 | Served alongside a 16-year tenure on the city planning commission; did not seek re-election in 2006 |
| Stephen Kunselman | Democratic | 2006–2008 | Unseated in 2008 by Christopher Taylor |
| Christopher Taylor | Democratic | 2008–2014 | Left seat after being elected Mayor of Ann Arbor in 2014 |
| Julie Grand | Democratic | 2014–2022 | |
| Ayesha Ghazi Edwin | Democratic | 2022–2026 | Unopposed in the 2022 Democratic primary; stepped down and did not seek re-election in 2026, endorsing Ashley Hall |

=== Presidential-year seat (historically odd-year seat) ===
| Name | Party | Term of Office | Notes |
|---|---|---|---|
| Frank A. C. Davis | | 1956–1957 | |
| Charles W. Joiner | | 1957–1959 | |
| Henry V. Aquinto | | 1959–1960 | |
| James F. Brinkerhoff | | 1960–1961 | |
| Paul H. Johnson | Republican | 1961–1965 | Advocated for redistricting Ann Arbor's wards to balance population disparities |
| Joseph W. Edwards | Republican | 1965–1969 | |
| John C. Feldkamp | | 1969–1971 | |
| Robert Henry Jr. | Republican | 1971–1975 | Principal GOP spokesman who sought repeal of the historic $5 marijuana law; later served as a local attorney in subsequent election lawsuits |
| Louis Senunas | Republican | 1975–1981 | Won his Ward 3 seat against Democrat Les Seeligson in the 1977 municipal election |
| Virginia O. Johansen | Republican | 1981–1983 | |
| Jeff Epton | Democratic | 1983–1989 | Co-founder of the Central America Sister City Task Force while serving Ward 3 |
| Nelson Meade | Democratic | 1989–1993 | Elected to a return tenure on council through the early 1990s |
| Tobi Hanna-Davies | Democratic | 1993–1999 | |
| Heidi Herrell | Democratic | 1999–2003 | |
| Leigh Greden | Democratic | 2003–2009 | Unseated in the 2009 primary by Stephen Kunselman |
| Stephen Kunselman | Democratic | 2009–2015 | Unseated Leigh Greden in the 2009 Democratic primary |
| Zachary Ackerman | Democratic | 2015–2020 | |
| Travis Radina | Democratic | 2020–present | Unopposed in the August 2020 Democratic primary |

== Ward 4 ==
=== Presidential-year seat (historically odd-year seat) ===
| Name | Party | Term of Office | Notes |
|---|---|---|---|
| William J. Rademacher | Republican | 1955–1957 | Elected as Fourth Ward Alderman in 1955; continued as Councilmember following the 1956 charter modernization |
| John C. Martin | Republican | 1957–1961 | |
| Richard G. Walterhouse | Republican | 1961–1965 | U-M football star and engineer |
| John N. Craine | Republican | 1965–1968 | |
| James E. Stephenson | Republican | 1968–1973 | Resigned seat after being elected Mayor of Ann Arbor in 1973 |
| Bruce J. Carmichael | Republican | 1973–1974 | |
| Elizabeth M. Keogh | Democratic | 1974–1978 | Won seat in 1974 as part of Democratic gains in Ward 4 |
| Ronald Trowbridge | Republican | 1978–1981 | |
| Gerald D. Jernigan | Republican | 1981–1987 | Resigned his Ward 4 seat after being elected Mayor of Ann Arbor in 1987 |
| Edward C. Pierce | Democratic | 1987–1988 | Former Mayor of Ann Arbor who served a brief return stint on council |
| Mark Ouimet | Republican | 1988–1996 | Later served as Washtenaw County Commissioner and State Representative |
| Stephen C. Hartwell | Democratic | 1996–2003 | Previously Vice President of the Ann Arbor School Board |
| Marcia Higgins | Republican (1999–2005); Democratic (2005–2013) | 1999–2013 | First elected as a Republican in 1999, later switched to the Democratic party; unseated by Jack Eaton in the 2013 primary |
| Jack Eaton | Democratic | 2013–2020 | Unseated Marcia Higgins in the 2013 Democratic primary |
| Jen Eyer | Democratic | 2020–present | Unseated incumbent Jack Eaton in the 2020 Democratic primary |

=== Gubernatorial-year seat (historically even-year seat) ===
| Name | Party | Term of Office | Notes |
|---|---|---|---|
| Wendell E. Hulcher | Republican | 1956–1963 | Later elected Mayor of Ann Arbor in 1965 |
| Gerald H. Bell | Republican | 1963–1969 | |
| James R. Cappaert | Democratic | 1969–1970 | |
| David R. Fisher | Republican | 1970–1974 | |
| Jamie W. Kenworthy | Democratic | 1974–1977 | |
| E. Edward Hood | Republican | 1977–1983 | Served as Mayor Pro Tem on the 1981 council |
| Larry J. Hahn | Republican | 1983–1985 | |
| Jerry S. Schleicher | Republican | 1985–1993 | Served as Mayor Pro Tem in the early 1990s |
| Peter Nicolas | Democratic | 1993–1997 | Elected at age 21, serving two terms before pursuing a career in law |
| Jane Lumm | Republican | 1997–1998 | Briefly represented Ward 4 before returning to represent Ward 2 for multiple terms |
| Patrick A. Putman | Republican | 1998–1999 | |
| Christopher C. Kolb | Democratic | 1999–2001 | Resigned after being elected to the Michigan State House of Representatives |
| Margie Teall | Democratic | 2002–2014 | Did not seek re-election in 2014 |
| Graydon Krapohl | Democratic | 2014–2018 | Elected following Margie Teall's decision not to seek re-election; defeated by Elizabeth Nelson in the 2018 primary |
| Elizabeth Nelson | Democratic | 2018–2022 | Unseated incumbent Graydon Krapohl in the 2018 Democratic primary |
| Dharma Akmon | Democratic | 2022–2026 | Unseated incumbent Elizabeth Nelson by a plurality in the August 2, 2022 Democratic primary (receiving 2,481 votes to Nelson's 2,316); did not seek re-election in 2026 |

== Ward 5 ==
=== Presidential-year seat (historically odd-year seat) ===
| Name | Party | Term of Office | Notes |
|---|---|---|---|
| George A. Metzner | Republican | 1955–1957 | Elected as Fifth Ward Alderman in 1955; continued as Councilmember following the 1956 charter modernization |
| Carl A. Brauer Jr. | Republican | 1957–1961 | |
| John R. Laird | Republican | 1961–1964 | |
| LeRoy A. Cappaert | Democratic | 1964–1970 | Outspoken civil rights and housing advocate; unseated by Linden Pettys in 1970 |
| Linden C. Pettys | Republican | 1970–1974 | Defeated three-term incumbent LeRoy Cappaert in the 1970 election |
| Louis Belcher | Republican | 1974–1978 | Served as Mayor Pro Tem before being elected Mayor of Ann Arbor in 1978 |
| Joyce W. Chesbrough | Republican | 1978–1983 | Schoolteacher and former AATA Chairwoman |
| Kathy Edgren | Democratic | 1983–1988 | Focused on environmental policy and affordable housing |
| Thais Anne Peterson | Democratic | 1988–1994 | |
| Christopher C. Kolb | Democratic | 1994–2001 | Left council after being elected to the Michigan State House of Representatives |
| Wendy Ann Woods | Democratic | 2001–2007 | Unseated by Mike Anglin in the 2007 Democratic primary |
| Mike Anglin | Democratic | 2007–2015 | Unseated three-term incumbent Wendy Woods in the 2007 Democratic primary |
| Chip Smith | Democratic | 2015–2020 | Unseated by Erica Briggs in the August 2020 Democratic primary |
| Erica Briggs | Democratic | 2020–present | Unseated incumbent Chip Smith in the 2020 primary |

=== Gubernatorial-year seat (historically even-year seat) ===
| Name | Party | Term of Office | Notes |
|---|---|---|---|
| Richard Dea | Republican | 1956–1959 | |
| Bent F. Nielsen | Republican | 1959–1965 | Elected to the Washtenaw County Board of Supervisors |
| Richard E. Balzhiser | Republican | 1965–1968 | U-M chemical engineering professor; later appointed to the White House Office of Science and Technology |
| Henry L. Stadler | Democratic | 1968–1972 | |
| Carol Jones | Democratic | 1972–1974 | |
| Louis Belcher | Republican | 1974–1978 | Subsequently moved to the odd-year seat before his mayoral election |
| Lou Henry Velker | Republican | 1978–1983 | |
| Doris Preston | Democratic | 1983–1988 | |
| Thomas Richardson | Republican | 1988–1990 | |
| Joe Borda | Republican | 1988–1993 | |
| Elisabeth L. Daley | Democratic | 1993–2000 | |
| Chris Easthope | Democratic | 2000–2008 | Left council after winning election to a 15th District Court judgeship in 2008 |
| Carsten Hohnke | Democratic | 2008–2012 | |
| Chuck Warpehoski | Democratic | 2012–2018 | Unseated by Ali Ramlawi in the 2018 Democratic primary |
| Ali Ramlawi | Democratic | 2018–2022 | Unseated incumbent Chuck Warpehoski in the 2018 primary; defeated by Jenn Cornell in the 2022 primary |
| Jenn Cornell | Democratic | 2022–present | Unseated incumbent Ali Ramlawi in the 2022 Democratic primary |

== See also ==
- List of mayors of Ann Arbor, Michigan
