= Chris Kolb =

American politician (born 1958)

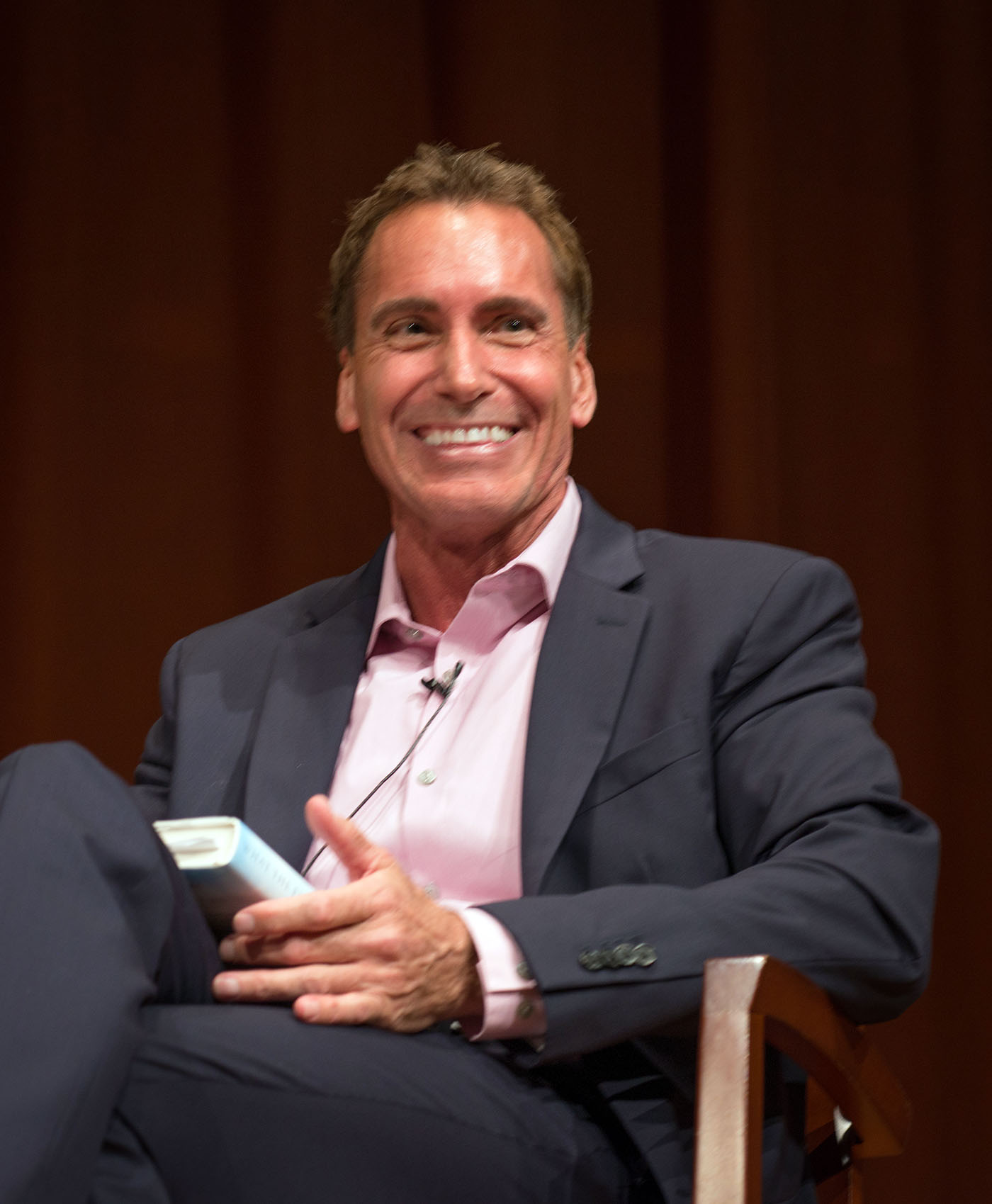

Member of the Michigan House of Representatives from the 53rd district
- In office January 1, 2001 – December 31, 2006
- Preceded by: Elizabeth Brater
- Succeeded by: Rebekah Warren

Personal details
- Born: 1958 (age 67–68) Ann Arbor, Michigan
- Party: Democratic
- Education: University of Michigan; Emory University

Chris Kolb (born 1958) is a politician from Ann Arbor, Michigan and a former member of the Michigan State House of Representatives. A Democrat, Kolb represented the 53rd district, based in Ann Arbor, from January 2001 to January 2007. He was first elected in November 2000, and term limits prevented him from seeking a fourth two-year term in 2006. Kolb was the first openly gay member of the Michigan Legislature.

== Early life ==
Kolb graduated from Huron High School in 1976. He went on the University of Michigan, where he received a bachelor of science in natural resources before conducting graduate studies in political science at Emory University in Atlanta, Georgia.

He worked in the environmental management field for 12 years, specializing in waste management and recycling.

== Political career ==
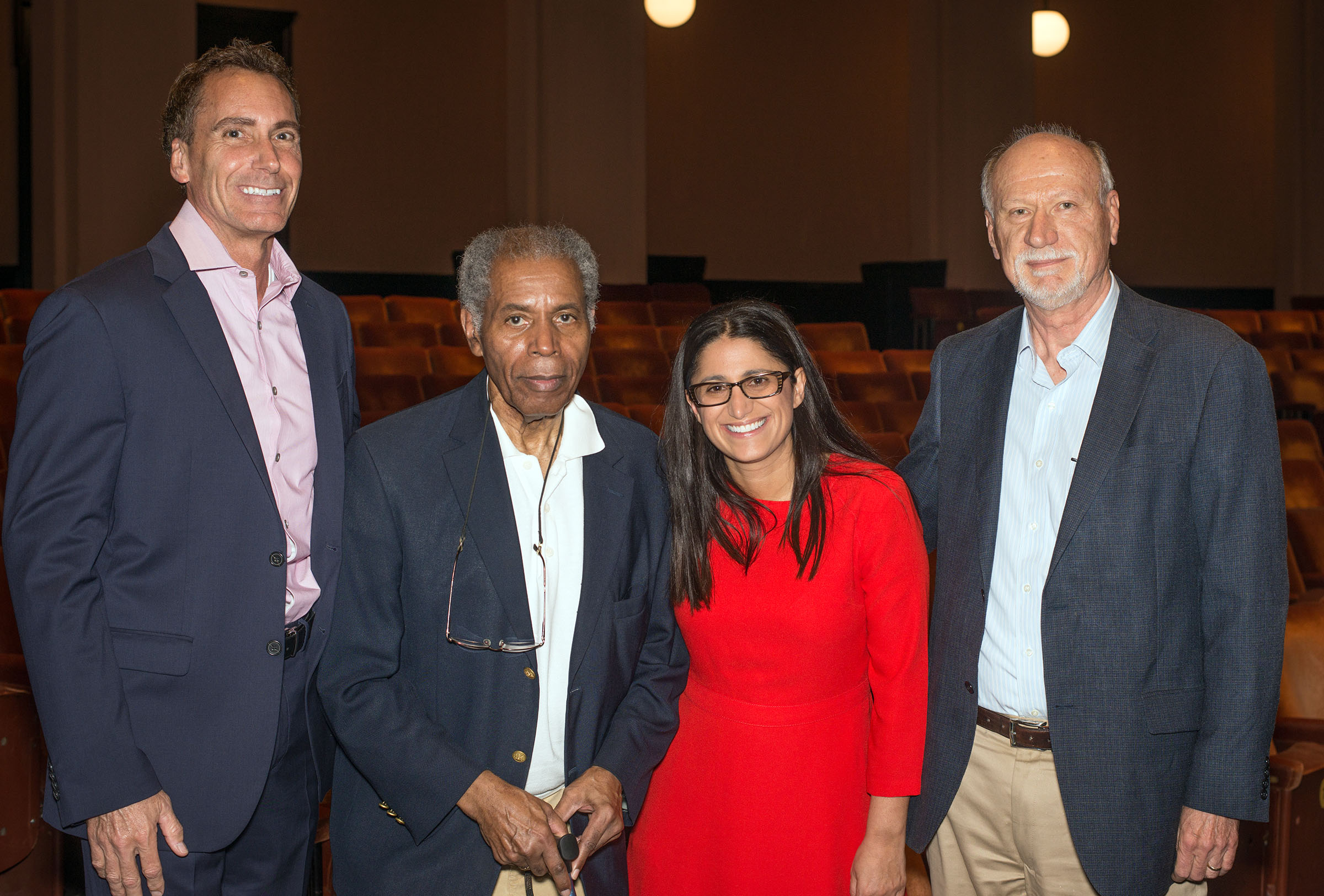
Kolb with Bunyan Bryant, Dr. Mona Hannah-Attisha, and Paul Mohai

Prior to his tenure in the House, Kolb served eight years on the Ann Arbor City Council and was Mayor Pro-tem from 1994 through 2000. Kolb ran for mayor of Ann Arbor as the Democratic nominee in 1996 and 1998, accusing incumbent Republican mayor Ingrid Sheldon of not doing enough in the areas of environmental policy, affordable housing, and downtown vitality, but he lost both races by narrow margins.

In 2000, he ran for state representative in the 53rd district, seeking to succeed the term-limited Liz Brater. He ran unopposed in the Democratic primary and won the general election with 27,682 votes (71%) to his Republican opponent's 11,553 (29%). On his taking office, Kolb became the first ever openly gay member of the Michigan Legislature. His election campaigns have frequently won the support of the Gay & Lesbian Victory Fund.

Kolb also previously served as a Legislative Aide to State Representative John P. Hansen.

In the Michigan House, Kolb supported environmental legislation such as the Open Space Preservation Act, signed into law by Governor Jennifer Granholm. In 2002, Governor Jennifer Granholm appointed him to the Michigan Land Use Leadership Council, which would advise her on land use policy. He also supported low tuition at state universities and attempted to add sexual orientation to the list of characteristics covered under the state's Ethnic Intimidation Act.

== After the House ==
On leaving the House of Representatives, Kolb accepted a job with the Early Childhood Investment Corporation, a state agency charged with the education of children under the age of five. He served as Vice President for Public Affairs. He also served as executive director of Unity Michigan, a statewide coalition of LGBT advocacy groups. In December 2008, he became President of the Michigan Environmental Council, a statewide coalition of 70 environmental, public health and faith-based nonprofit groups. In 2015, Gov. Rick Snyder appointed him to co-chair the Flint Water Advisory Task Force, which investigated the city’s drinking water crisis and provided recommendations to prevent similar disasters statewide.

He was the state of Michigan’s budget director for two years, following his appointment by Gov. Gretchen Whitmer in 2019. In this role, he was responsible for coordinating all aspects of the state’s $60 billion budget.

In 2021 he was appointed to be the University of Michigan’s Vice President for Government Relations. Chris Kolb is responsible for providing university-wide leadership, strategic vision and effective management of U-M’s government relations programs at the local, state and federal levels, as well as the Economic Growth Institute and U-M’s participation in the University Research Corridor.

Term limits prevent him from seeking a return to the State House; Michigan's term limits amendment imposes a lifetime maximum of three two-year terms as a state representative. In 2010, he declined to run for the Michigan Senate in the 18th District, a seat left open when Democratic Sen. Liz Brater was termed out.

== Electoral history ==
- 2004 election for State House
  - Chris Kolb (D), 80%
  - Erik Sheagren (R), 20%
- 2002 election for State House
  - Chris Kolb (D), 78%
  - John Milroy (R), 22%
- 2000 election for State House
  - Chris Kolb (D), 71%
  - Robert Bykowski (R), 29%

Preceded by Elizabeth Brater (D)	State Representative for Michigan's 53rd District; 2001–2007	Succeeded by Rebekah Warren (D)
