= Yousef Rabhi =

American politician

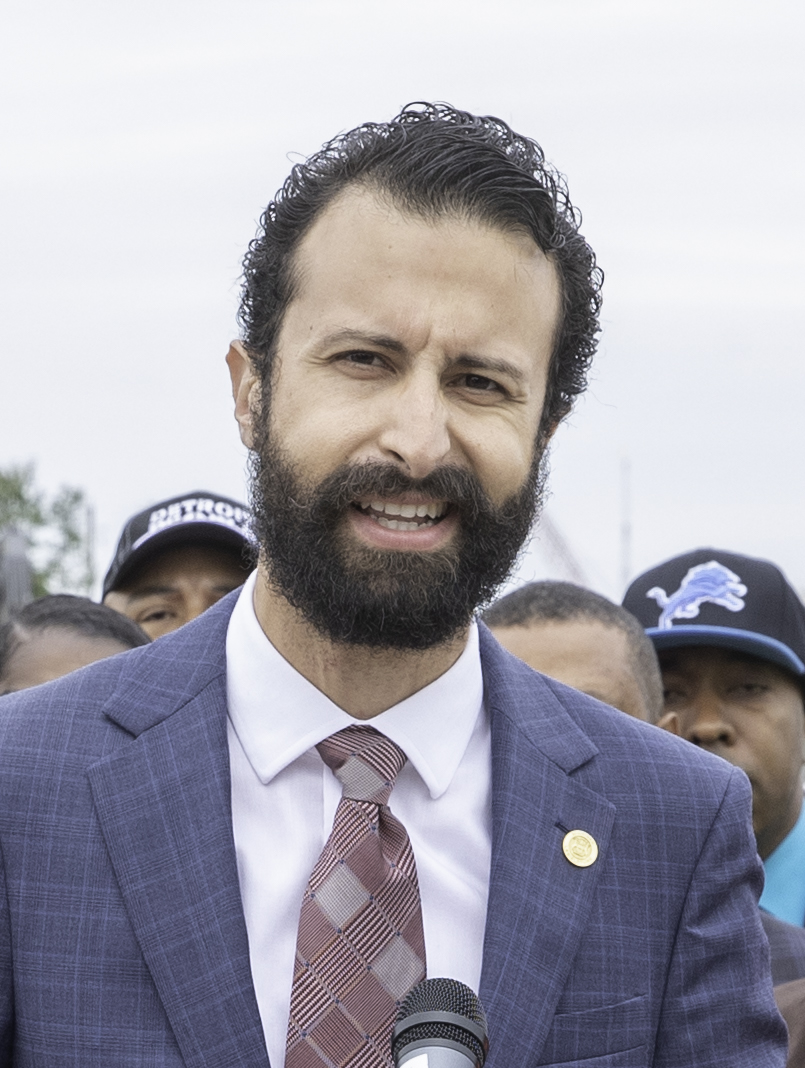
- Rabhi in 2019

Member of the Washtenaw County Board of Commissioners from District 8
- Incumbent
- Assumed office January 1, 2023
- Preceded by: Jason Morgan
- In office January 1, 2011 – January 1, 2017
- Succeeded by: Jason Morgan

Member of the Michigan House of Representatives from the 53rd district
- In office January 1, 2017 – January 1, 2023
- Preceded by: Jeff Irwin
- Succeeded by: Brenda Carter

Personal details
- Born: June 9, 1988 (age 38) Ypsilanti, Michigan, U.S.
- Party: Democratic
- Other political affiliations: Democratic Socialists of America
- Children: 1
- Education: University of Michigan
- Website: Rep. Yousef Rabhi

Yousef D. Rabhi (born June 9, 1988) is an American politician serving as a member of the Washtenaw County Board of Commissioners since 2023. A member of the Democratic Party and the Democratic Socialists of America (DSA), Rabhi represented Michigan's 53rd House District in the Michigan House of Representatives from 2017 to 2023. He is the mayor elect for Ann Arbor Michigan.

== Early life and education ==
Rabhi was born in Ypsilanti and raised on the North Side of Ann Arbor. His father, Lounes Rabhi, is a mechanical engineer, and his mother, Peggy Rabhi (née Deitos), is a longstanding local community activist. His mother's involvement in the Ann Arbor Democratic Party, as well as his grandfather's history of labor organizing in Detroit, inspired Rabhi to pursue a career in public service. Rabhi is a University of Michigan alum and is of Algerian descent on his paternal side.

== Career ==
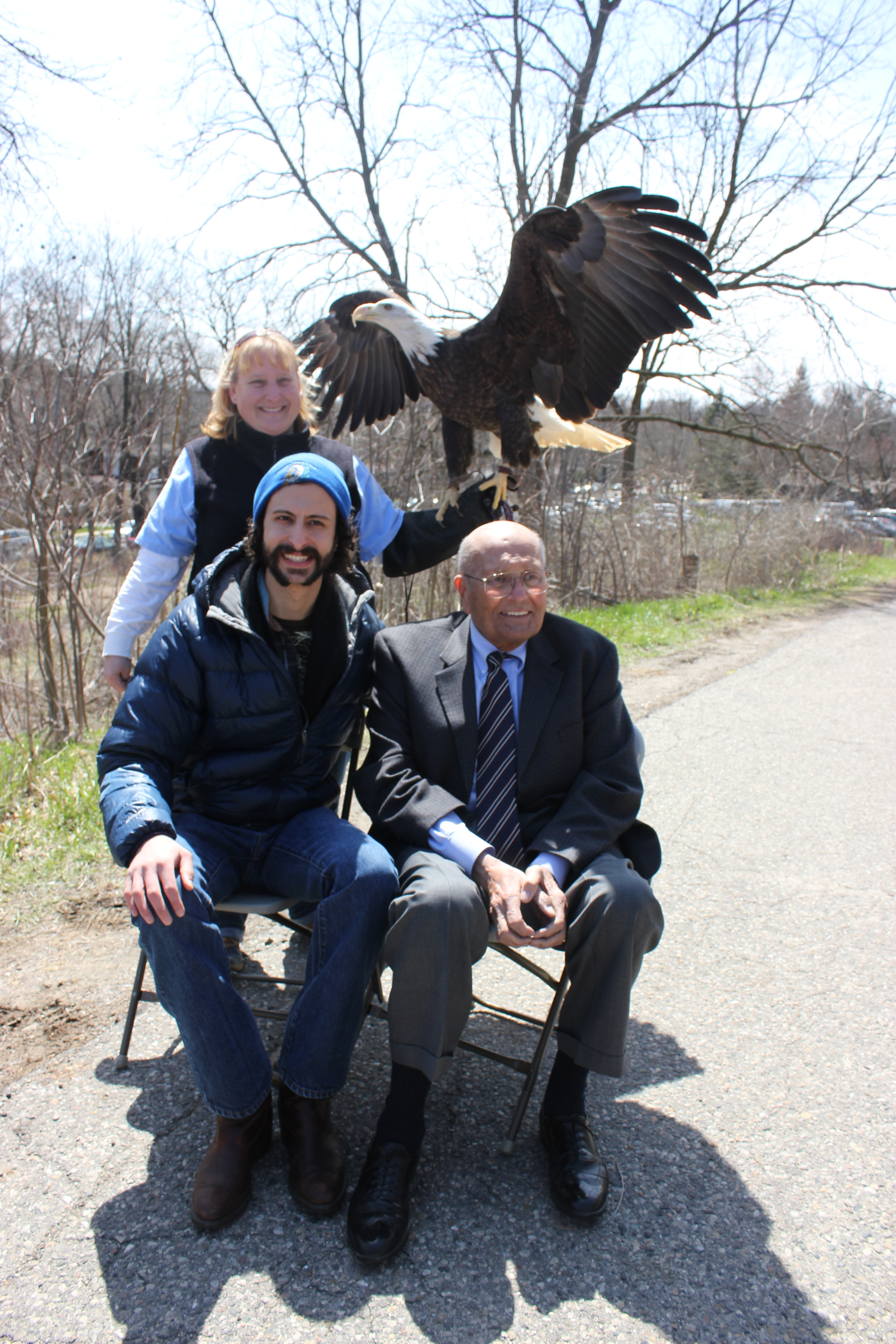
Rabhi with John Dingell at the Leslie Science & Nature Center during his tenure as county commissioner, 2013

Rabhi began his career on the Washtenaw County Board of Commissioners, beginning his run for the position before he graduated from the University of Michigan. After six years in the Michigan House of Representatives, Rabhi returned to the county commission.

=== Washtenaw County Board of Commissioners (2011–2016) ===
During his first tenure on the board of commissioners, Rabhi and the commission approved the brownfield redevelopment plan for the blighted Georgetown Mall site (later redeveloped as The George). Supporting the plan, Rabhi described it as "self-regulating" and noted that if the developer pulled out of the project or if something went wrong, there would be no cost to the county, stating, "The developer doesn’t get money from TIF dollars if the property doesn’t gain in value." The board delayed and ultimately did not back the developer's separate request for a $1 million state loan.

Rabhi also represented the county board on a task force to offer a county ID card. During this process, he suggested that the ID program could be the start of a partnership between the county and a non-profit. After it passed in 2014, the program was extended in 2015. He also voted in favor of the creation of a county-run dental clinic for low-income residents of Washtenaw county. The resolution was brought by commissioner Andy LaBarre.

=== Michigan House of Representatives (2017-2022) ===
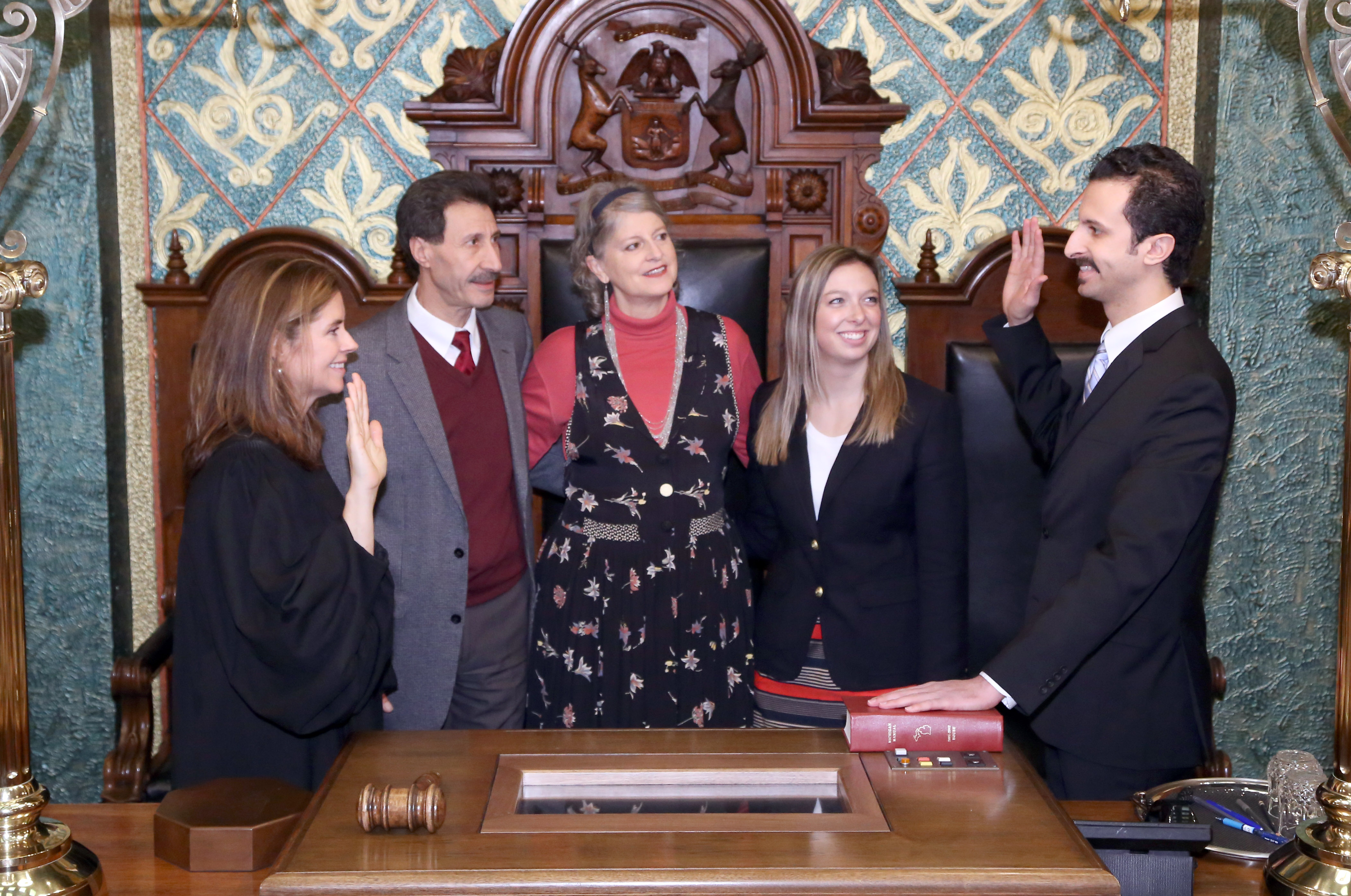
Rabhi (right) and family members attend his swearing-in ceremony at the Michigan State Capitol in Lansing.

Rabhi was sworn into the 99th Michigan Legislature in January 2017. He served on the House Appropriations Committee and its subcommittees on Higher Education, Community Colleges, and the Department of Environmental Quality. He also served as the minority vice chair on the Appropriations Subcommittee on the Department of Environmental Quality. During his second term, he served on the Committee on Government Operations, the House Fiscal Agency Governing Committee, and the Legislative Council.

Rabhi has campaigned for the shutdown of Enbridge Line 5, a petroleum pipeline that crosses the Straits of Mackinac, stating that the pipeline is likely to spill due to age.

He opposed revisions to the Michigan Public School Employees Retirement System in 2017 that shifted state educators' pensions into 401(k) plans.

Rabhi has also backed legislation supporting immigration rights, legal marijuana, and no-fault auto insurance.

Rabhi was elected Democratic Floor Leader for the 100th session of the Michigan Legislature. In late 2021, he voted against a bill that would have required owners of abused animals to pay for the shelter costs for those animals.

=== Washtenaw County Board of Commissioners (2023-present) ===
After being term-limited in the Michigan House of Representatives, Rabhi returned to the Washtenaw County Board of Commissioners, taking office in January 2023 to represent District 8. He won re-election to the seat in 2024. During this tenure, his assignments have included the Environmental Council, the Parks and Recreation Commission, and the Huron River Watershed Council. Returning to the board, Rabhi has focused heavily on environmental policy. He emerged as a vocal opponent of state-level tax exemptions for large-scale corporate data centers, arguing that hyperscale data centers drain community water resources and threaten Michigan's climate goals to power artificial intelligence infrastructure. In 2025, he supported a county board resolution providing a blueprint for local townships to evaluate and manage the environmental impacts of proposed data centers. Additionally, following the 2024 renewal of the county's Mental Health and Public Safety Millage, Rabhi was appointed to the Public Safety Millage Advisory Committee to help guide millage priorities.

== 2026 Ann Arbor mayoral campaign ==
On February 2, 2026, Rabhi announced his candidacy for Mayor of Ann Arbor, challenging incumbent mayor Christopher Taylor in the Democratic primary scheduled for August 4. Rabhi launched his campaign with approximately $57,000 in available capital, consisting of unspent funds from previous campaigns alongside leftover balances transferred from the Liberty and Justice for All PAC. Running as a Democratic Socialist, Rabhi's platform emphasizes lowering the cost of living, protecting public resources, and expanding public ownership of municipal systems.

The campaign centers heavily on housing affordability and municipal energy. Rabhi advocates for the construction of permanently affordable housing on city-owned land and opposes the sale of public parcels to private developers for market-rate housing developments, arguing that relying primarily on market-rate construction does not sufficiently lower housing costs. On energy sustainability, Rabhi campaigns on municipalizing the local power grid to establish a publicly owned utility independent of DTE Energy and has been a long time supporter of Ann Arbor for Public Power, the grassroots entity behind the ballot proposal for the municipalization of the power grid. During candidate debates, the race has also included disputes over campaign finance, with the candidates trading accusations regarding the influence of corporate political contributions and independent expenditure mailers.

In July 2026, a formal campaign finance complaint was filed against Rabhi's campaign committee, alleging violations of state election law concerning the distribution of literature. The complaint alleged that the campaign improperly coordinated or incorrectly reported funding disclosures on physical mailers detailing organizational endorsements. On July 20, the Michigan Bureau of Elections sent Rabhi a letter informing him of the complaint and citing the part of the campaign finance act that he allegedly violated.

Rabhi's mayoral campaign has received endorsements from several labor unions and progressive organizations, including the United Auto Workers (UAW) Region 1A, Teamsters Local 243, the Huron Valley Area Labor Federation, the Ann Arbor Education Association (AAEA), Transport Workers Union Local 171 (TWU), Michigan Working Families Party, and the Huron Valley chapter of the Democratic Socialists of America. Rabhi won the Democratic primary in the August 4th election, defeating Taylor 55% to 45%.
