= Ingrid Sheldon =

American politician (born 1945)

59th Mayor of Ann Arbor
- In office 1993–2000
- Preceded by: Liz Brater
- Succeeded by: John Hieftje

Personal details
- Born: Ingrid Blom Sheldon; 1945 (age 80–81)
- Party: Republican
- Education: Eastern Michigan University (BA); University of Michigan (MEd)

Ingrid Blom Sheldon (born 1945) is an American politician who served as the 59th mayor of Ann Arbor, Michigan from 1993 to 2000. A moderate Republican, she served four two-year terms in the post. To date, Sheldon remains the city's last Republican mayor.

== Education ==
Sheldon earned a Bachelor of Science in education from Eastern Michigan University and a master's in education from the University of Michigan. Sheldon then worked as a sixth grade teacher for three years.

== Career ==
Sheldon became involved in city government during these years, and first ran for elected office in 1988, when she was elected to the city council as a Republican.

Four years later, Sheldon ran for mayor against incumbent Democrat Liz Brater. The campaign was seen as one of Ann Arbor's more divisive mayoral contests of recent years. Sheldon defeated Brater in the April 5, 1993 election. Sheldon won reelection over Democratic challenger David F. Stead in November 1994.

In Sheldon's reelection campaigns of 1996 and 1998, she won narrowly against Ann Arbor city councilman Chris Kolb. Sheldon left office in 2000 when she decided not to run for re-election, and was succeeded by Democrat John Hieftje.

As a Republican mayor in an overwhelmingly Democratic city, and facing large Democratic majorities on the city council throughout her tenure, Sheldon took a moderate approach to governance. Like many Ann Arbor Republicans, she was a fiscal conservative and a social liberal.

During her years as mayor, Sheldon served on the board of the Michigan Association of Mayors, and served as president of the Michigan Municipal League. She chaired the league's Let Local Votes Count campaign, an attempt in 2000 to pass a state initiative that would limit the state government's ability to overturn local municipalities' ordinances.

Since leaving office, Sheldon has been involved with a number of local nonprofit organizations, including the Ann Arbor Summer Festival and the Ann Arbor Civic Theatre. Sheldon discusses her childhood and experiences as mayor in an essay in the book Ann Arbor (W)rites: A Community Memoir.

Sheldon remains an active member of the Ann Arbor community, including working as a bookkeeper at a tennis club.

== Personal life ==
Sheldon's husband, Cliff Sheldon, served as a member of the Ann Arbor city council from 1978 to 1982. She has two children and six grandchildren.

Preceded by Elizabeth Brater	Mayor of Ann Arbor, Michigan; 1993–2000	Succeeded by John Hieftje
