= Rebekah Warren =

American politician

Member of the Michigan House of Representatives from the 55th district
- In office January 1, 2019 – January 1, 2021
- Preceded by: Adam Zemke
- Succeeded by: Felicia Brabec

Member of the Michigan Senate from the 18th district
- In office January 1, 2011 – January 1, 2019
- Preceded by: Liz Brater
- Succeeded by: Jeff Irwin

Member of the Michigan House of Representatives from the 53rd district
- In office January 1, 2007 – January 1, 2011
- Preceded by: Chris Kolb
- Succeeded by: Jeff Irwin

Personal details
- Born: November 25, 1971 (age 54) Owosso, Michigan
- Party: Democratic
- Spouse: Conan Smith
- Education: University of Michigan

Rebekah Lynn Warren (born November 25, 1971) is a former American Democratic legislator from Ann Arbor, Michigan, who represented the 55th District of the Michigan House of Representatives from January 1, 2019 until January 1, 2021. She was elected to this position on November 6, 2018, beating Republican opponent Bob Baird, 74% to 26%. Previously, she served two terms as State Representative for Michigan's 53rd District, from 2007 to 2010, and two terms in the Michigan Senate, from 2010 to 2018. She was arrested for drunk driving and fleeing police in a motor vehicle on December 26, 2019.

== Background ==
Warren was raised in Owosso, Michigan, and attended the University of Michigan, majoring in political science. In 1993 she joined the staff of State Representative Mary Schroer of Ann Arbor, Michigan and later that of State Representative Hubert Price of Pontiac, Michigan. From 1999 to 2006 she was the executive director of NARAL Pro-Choice Michigan, the state affiliate of NARAL Pro-Choice America.

== House of Representatives ==
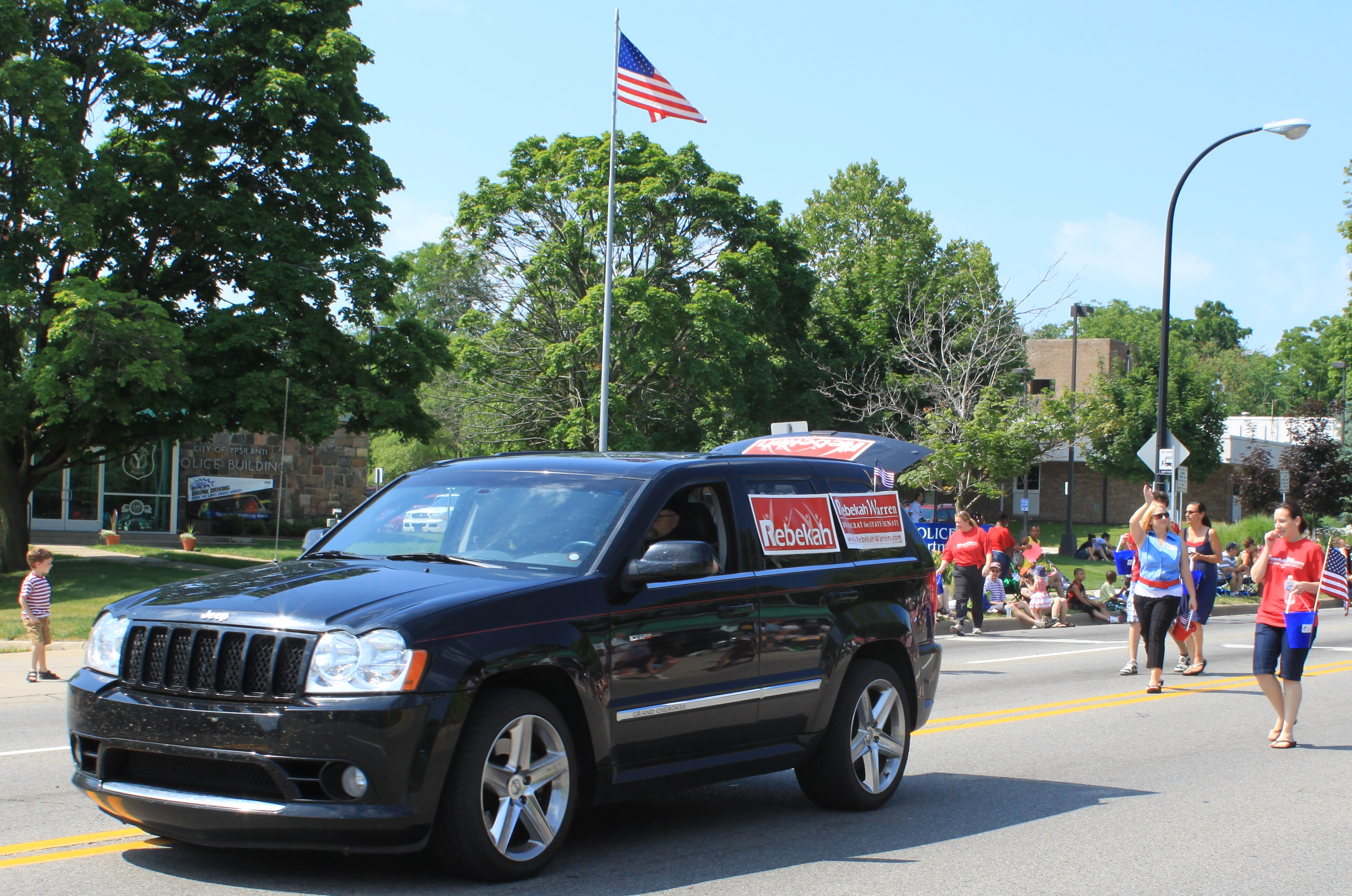
Rebekah Warren waves to crowd in 2011 Ypsilanti Independence Day Parade

She was elected to a two-year term in the Michigan House of Representatives in 2006 and was subsequently reelected in 2008. Warren chaired the House Great Lakes and Environment Committee since and sat on the Judiciary Committee, the Tax Policy Committee, and the Oversight and Investigations Committee. She also co-chaired the Michigan BioTech Caucus with Republican Senator Randy Richardville.

== Political views ==
Warren is a progressive Democrat, subscribing to tenets of social equity, environmental conservation and liberal fiscal policies.

=== Women's rights ===
Warren is an ardent supporter of gender equity and has championed abortion rights. In 2005 she was recognized for her leadership by the National Women's Political Caucus of Michigan with their annual Millie Award. NOW of Michigan named her "Legislator of the Year" in 2009.

She has sponsored or cosponsored legislation to prevent pay discrimination, provide emergency contraception, extend family medical leave to adopting parents, and provide support and protections for sexual assault survivors.

=== Environmental protection ===
Environmental issues topped Warren's agenda in the state legislature in 2007–2008. She championed the passage of the Great Lakes Compact and associated legislation to govern withdrawals of the state's groundwater. The Center for Michigan touted the package as "the most important accomplishment to come out of the Michigan legislature this year."

=== Education ===
Warren and mother-in-law Alma Wheeler Smith introduced legislation in 2009 to provide free college tuition for Michigan residents by raising the state income tax.

== 2010 State Senate race ==
In 2010, Warren competed with fellow Democrat Pam Byrnes for the Democratic nomination for the 18th Michigan Senate seat to succeed Liz Brater. Five days before the primary election, an article in a Michigan newspaper revealed that ads for Byrnes and attacking Warren were financed by The Great Lakes Education Project, a Political Action Committee (PAC) funded in part by Republicans Dick and Betsy DeVos. The Great Lakes Education Project (GLEP) lobbies for choice, accountability and quality in education and assists candidates that support education reform. Warren defeated Byrnes in the primary election with 55.7% of the vote.

== Personal life ==
Until 2017, Warren was married to Washtenaw County Commissioner Conan Smith and was the daughter-in-law of Alma Wheeler Smith.

== DUI arrest ==
On the evening of December 26, 2019, Warren was arrested in Auburn Hills, MI, on suspicion of DUI. Police had received several calls in relation to an apparently impaired driver at approximately 11 p.m. Police dashcam footage showed Warren's Jeep driving erratically and colliding with the right wall of northbound I-75 before continuing on. When finally stopped, Warren told police she was on her way home to Ann Arbor. She also told the arresting officer that she had consumed 2-3 glasses of wine "just a minute ago" and subsequently failed a field sobriety test administered at the scene.

Warren refused to take a breathalyzer test and was taken by police to McLaren Hospital in Pontiac where testing showed her blood alcohol level was .21, almost triple the legal limit. Police dashcam footage showed Warren telling police at the scene "You understand there's going to be a moment where we're both going to be on TV", adding "I'm elected. I'm a senator. This is going to be the most famous arrest you've ever made."

On February 18, 2020, Warren pled guilty to a reduced charge of misdemeanor driving while intoxicated. On May 27, 2020, Warren was sentenced to one year of probation and 10 days of community service. She did not seek re-election in the 2020 election, and was succeeded by fellow Democrat Felicia Brabec.

== Elections ==
Position	Election Year	Votes	Opponent's votes	Opponent
State Representative	2010	60,333	31,771	John Hochstetler
State Senate	2014	61,421	23,745	Terry Linden

Michigan House of Representatives
Preceded by Chris Kolb	Member of the Michigan House of Representatives for the 53rd District; 2007–2011	Succeeded by Jeff Irwin
Preceded by Adam Zemke	Member of the Michigan House of Representatives for the 55th District; 2019–present	Succeeded by Incumbent
Michigan Senate
Preceded by Elizabeth S. Brater	Member of the Michigan Senate for the 18th District; 2011–2019	Succeeded by Jeff Irwin
