= Lynn Rivers =

American politician (born 1956)

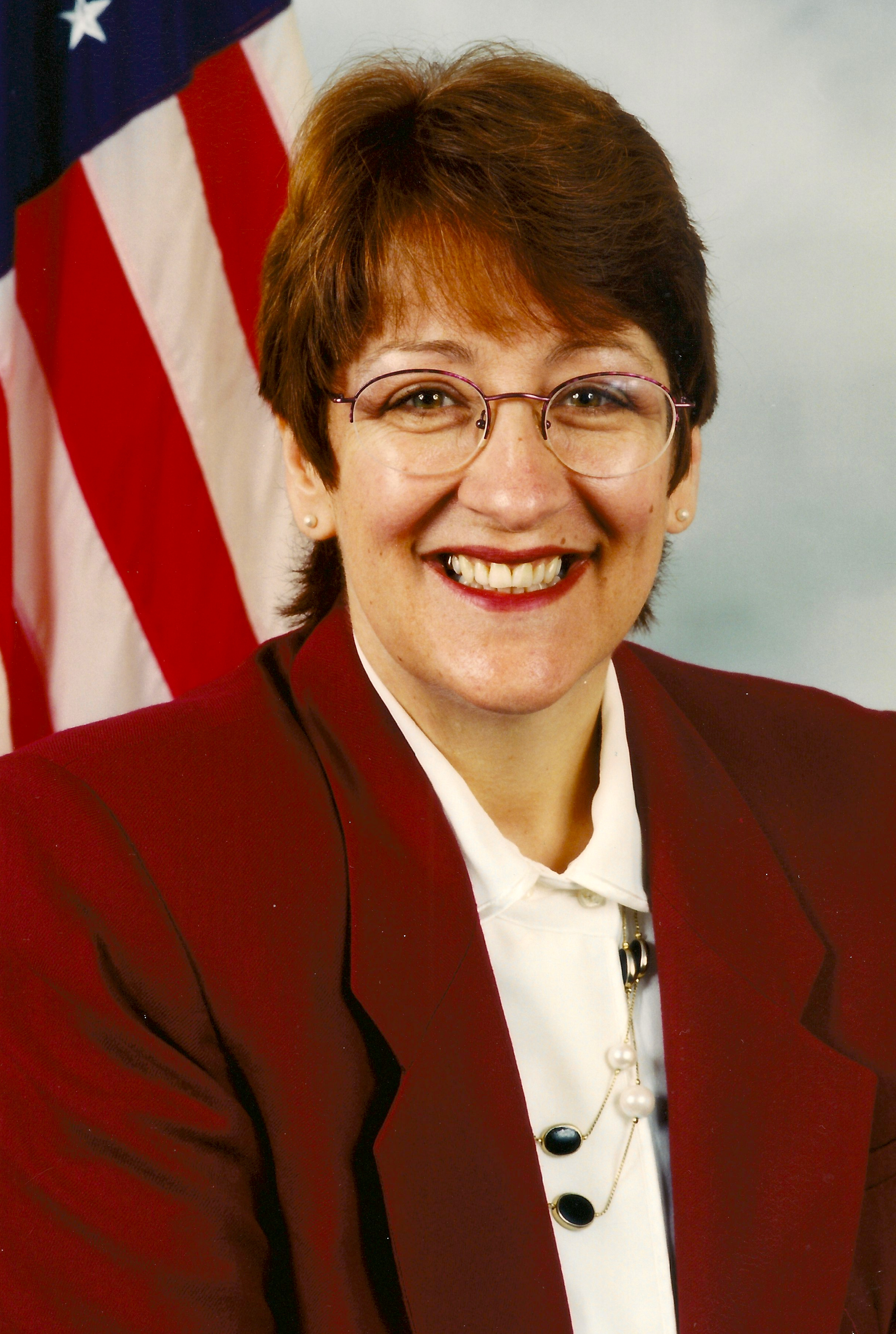

Member of the U.S. House of Representatives from Michigan's 13th district
- In office January 3, 1995 – January 3, 2003
- Preceded by: Bill Ford
- Succeeded by: John Dingell (redistricted)

Member of the Michigan House of Representatives from the 53rd district
- In office January 13, 1993 – January 11, 1995
- Preceded by: Perry Bullard
- Succeeded by: Elizabeth Brater

Personal details
- Born: Lynn Nancy Carruthers; December 19, 1956 (age 69) Au Gres, Michigan, U.S.
- Party: Democratic
- Education: University of Michigan (BA); Wayne State University (JD)

Lynn Nancy Rivers (née Carruthers; born December 19, 1956) is an American politician and lawyer from Michigan. She served four terms in the United States House of Representatives from 1995 to 2003.

== Early life and education ==
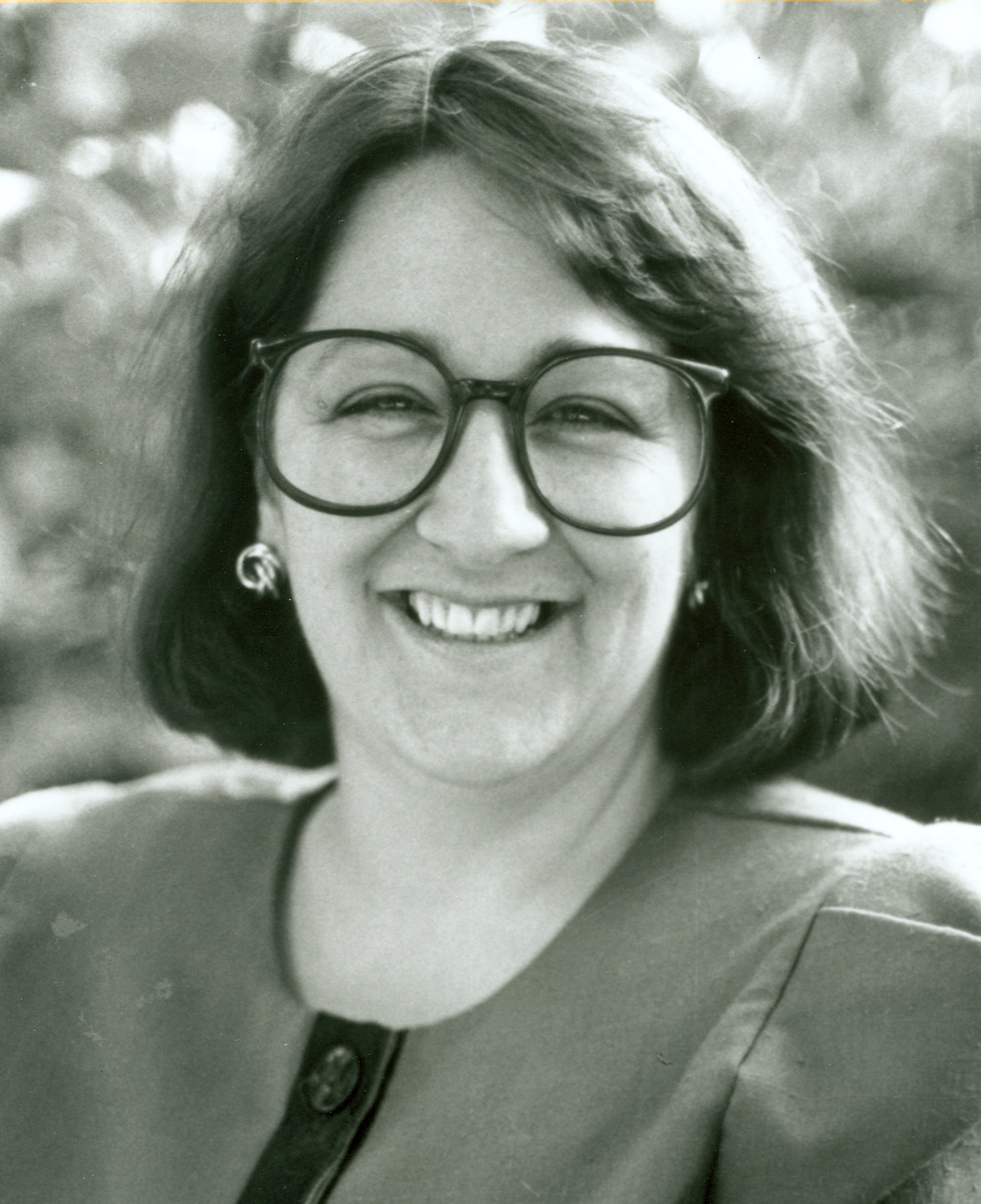
River's in 1999

Rivers was born in Au Gres, Michigan, and graduated from Au Gres-Sims High School, Arenac County, in 1975. She was married the day after graduation, and had two children by age 21.

She received a B.A. in biological anthropology from the University of Michigan in 1987 and a J.D. from Wayne State University in 1992.

== Career ==
She served as a trustee of the Ann Arbor board of education from 1984 to 1992. She was a member of the Michigan State House of Representatives between 1993 and 1994.

Rivers was elected as a Democrat from Michigan's 13th District to the United States House of Representatives for the 104th and to the three succeeding Congresses, serving from January 3, 1995, to January 3, 2003.

After Michigan lost a district in the United States 2000 Census reapportionment, much of her district was merged into a redrawn 15th District together with long-time incumbent John Dingell. Rivers challenged Dingell in the Democratic primary for the new 15th. However, running in a district that was over 65 percent new to her, she lost to Dingell by 18 points.

Immediately after leaving Congress, she taught political science at the University of Michigan and at Washtenaw Community College.

== Political positions ==
=== Mental health ===
During her first US House run in 1994, Rivers spoke publicly about her long struggle with bipolar disorder. She was about 21 when she was diagnosed. While in Congress she spoke about her condition on the House floor, making her the first openly bipolar member of Congress. In 1998, the National Mental Health Association (NMHA) named her "Legislator of the Year."

== See also ==
- Women in the United States House of Representatives

U.S. House of Representatives
Preceded by Bill Ford	Member of the U.S. House of Representatives from Michigan's 13th congressional district 1995–2003	Succeeded by Carolyn Cheeks Kilpatrick
U.S. order of precedence (ceremonial)
Preceded by William Brodhead as Former U.S. Representative	Order of precedence of the United States as Former U.S. Representative	Succeeded by Thaddeus McCotter as Former U.S. Representative
