= William S. Maynard =

American politician (1802–1866)

William Sumner Maynard (April 25, 1802 – June 18, 1866) was a politician from the U.S. state of Michigan, who served as mayor of Ann Arbor, Michigan from 1856 to 1858 and again from 1865 to 1866.

== Career ==
Maynard was born in Berkshire County, Massachusetts. His father Ezra Maynard was one of the earliest settlers in Ann Arbor.

Maynard had been Ann Arbor's biggest land developer, a member and organizer in 1836 of the Ann Arbor Land Company, which acquired the former Henry Rumsey farm east of town, conveying 40 acres thereof to the newly formed State of Michigan as the site of the future University of Michigan, while hoping to profit by subdividing and selling town lots adjacent to the campus. Maynard also developed much of the land west of Ann Arbor's Main Street, as far west as the present Seventh Street. His own landmark dwelling was on the northwest corner of Main and William Street, and the estate stretched west to the present Ashley street, and halfway up the block to Liberty. For many years he owned a grocery, drug and dry-goods store.

He was said to be one of the two wealthiest men in Ann Arbor, with real estate holdings worth $50,000. He had at least two servants.

== Personal life and death ==
Maynard's first wife was Julia Guiteau (d. 1856), whose nephew, Charles Julius Guiteau, assassinated President James Garfield on July 2, 1881. For a short while in 1859 Charles Guiteau lived with his uncle in Ann Arbor, while trying to gain admission to the University of Michigan.

He suffered from severe depression and (while still Mayor) killed himself in 1866 by an overdose of laudanum. Long notes of explanation were found in the pockets of his dressing gown, detailing Maynard's struggles with "The Evil One" (a synonym for Satan). The notes were published verbatim in Ann Arbor's several weekly newspapers.

His grave is in Forest Hill Cemetery in Ann Arbor.

Political offices
Preceded by James Kingsley	Mayor of Ann Arbor, Michigan; 1856–1858	Succeeded by Philip Bach
Preceded by Ebenezer Wells	Mayor of Ann Arbor, Michigan; 1865–1866	Succeeded by Oliver M. Martin
