= Wendell Hulcher =

American politician (1922–1999)

Wendell Ellsworth Hulcher (November 3, 1922 – May 6, 1999) was an American businessman, politician, and government bureaucrat. He served as mayor of Ann Arbor, Michigan from 1965 to 1969.

== Life and career ==
Hulcher served as a pilot in the United States Army Air Forces during World War II and graduated from Illinois Wesleyan University and Harvard Business School. During the early 1950s, he was employed as a consultant for McKinsey & Company, before taking a job as a manager at Ford Motor Company, which he held from 1954 to 1967.

Hulcher ran as a Republican for mayor of Ann Arbor, Michigan in 1965, defeating Democrat Eunice L. Burns, who was attempting to become the city's first female mayor. Hulcher won reelection to the mayor's office in 1967, defeating Democrat and anti-war activist Edward C. Pierce, who would go on to win a mayoral election in the mid-1980s. Hulcher decided not to run for a third term in 1969.

After his terms as mayor, Hulcher served in various agencies of the federal government through the 1970s. He was deputy director of the Office of Intergovernmental Relations from 1969 to 1971, and later a staff member for the American Revolution Bicentennial Commission (1975) and the Small Business Administration. From 1979 until his retirement in 1993, Hulcher was a professor of business and economics at Florida Southern College.

Hulcher died in 1999. His wife Violet Bell Hulcher died December 8, 2006. His personal papers are held at the Dwight D. Eisenhower Library, and papers from his time as Mayor of Ann Arbor are held at the Bentley Historical Library at the University of Michigan.

Preceded by Cecil O. Creal	Mayor of Ann Arbor, Michigan; 1965–1969	Succeeded by Robert J. Harris
