= Hash Bash =

Annual cannabis event in Ann Arbor, Michigan

- Status: Active
- Genre: Protest
- Frequency: Annually; first Saturday in April
- Venue: University of Michigan Diag
- Location: Ann Arbor, Michigan
- Country: United States
- Years active: 54
- Inaugurated: April 1, 1972; 54 years ago
- Most recent: April 4, 2026
- Next event: April 3, 2027
- Attendance: 8,000-15,000 (2015)
- Website: www.annarbor.org/cannabis/hash-bash/

Hash Bash is an annual cannabis event held on the University of Michigan campus in Ann Arbor, Michigan, featuring a series of speeches and live performances focus on the goal of legalizing marijuana at the federal, state, and local levels in the United States.

== History ==
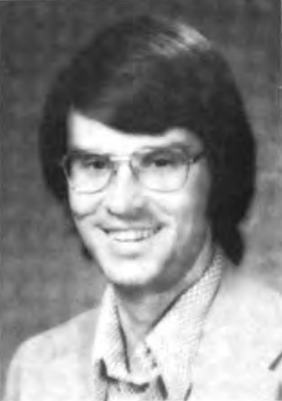
Perry Bullard, an early participant in Hash Bash and a proponent of marijuana legalization in Michigan

The first Hash Bash took place on April 1, 1972, as a reaction to the Michigan Supreme Court's ruling on March 9, 1972, which deemed unconstitutional the law that had been used to convict cultural activist John Sinclair for possessing two marijuana joints. The second annual Hash Bash, in 1973, attracted approximately 3,000 participants, including state representative Perry Bullard, a proponent of marijuana legalization.

Marijuana is openly consumed at the event, and in previous events, there have been few, if any, arrests. Before the state's legalization of recreational cannabis, the penalty for cannabis law violations in Ann Arbor was a $30 fine and $25 court costs for a total of $55, and was a civil infraction ticket. The campus falls under state, not city jurisdiction but "for decades, police had in the past exercised discretion and a general tolerance for public marijuana use at the annual Hash Bash. Protesters are commonly seen as consuming cannabis as a form of civil disobedience, anticipating minimal law enforcement intervention, which was largely the case until the seventh annual event in 1978, when local authorities began arresting participants suspected of using illegal substances.

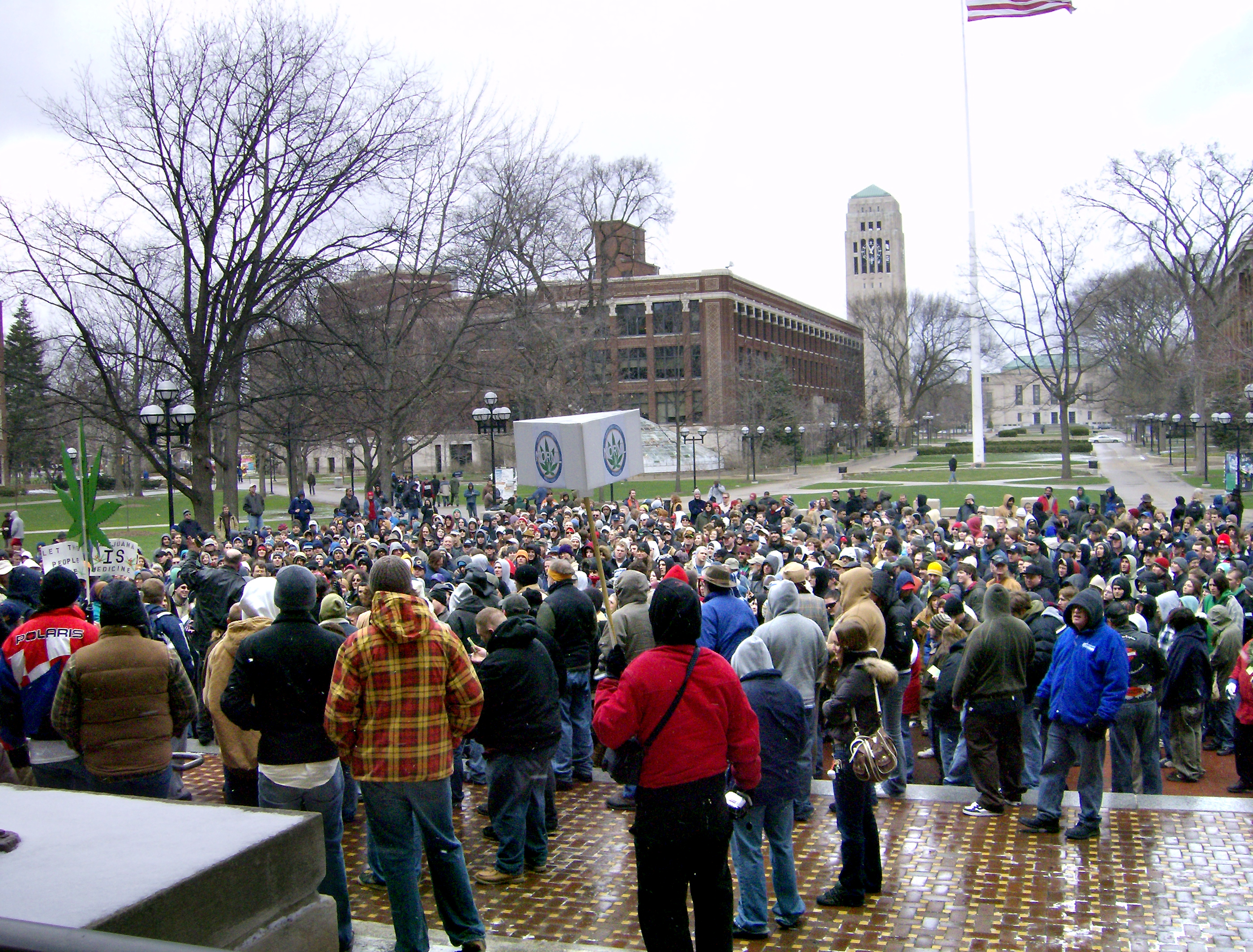
Hash Bash on April 7, 2007

By 1985, attendance at the Hash Bash had dropped to zero, but it soon revived. The 2009 Hash Bash celebrated the legalization of medical cannabis in Michigan through the Michigan Compassionate Care Initiative in 2008 and was the largest gathering that the event had seen in years, with an estimated 1,600 participants – an increased turnout which the Michigan Daily attributed to the "wider acceptance of recreational drug use both on campus and across the country". The 2010 Hash Bash had an estimated 5,000 attendees. The 2015 Hash Bash had a record 8,000–15,000 attendees. In 2019, Michigan Governor Gretchen Whitmer celebrated the state's recreational cannabis legalization in a video for Hash Bash attendees, having also attended the event the previous year while running for governor.

=== Recent and upcoming Hash Bash dates ===
- 2026: 55th annual - April 4
- 2025: 54th annual - April 5
- 2024: 53rd annual - April 6
- 2023: 52nd annual - April 1
- 2022: 51st annual - April 2
- 2021: 50th annual - April 3 (virtual event due to coronavirus)
- 2020: 49th annual - April 4 (canceled due to coronavirus)
- 2019: 48th annual - April 6
- 2018: 47th annual - April 7
- 2017: 46th annual - April 1
- 2016: 45th annual - April 2
- 2015: 44th annual - April 4
- 2014: 43rd annual - April 5
- 2013: 42nd annual - April 6
- 2012: 41st annual - April 7
- 2011: 40th annual - April 2
- 2010: 39th annual - April 3
- 2009: 38th annual - April 4
- 2008: 37th annual - April 5
- 2007: 36th annual - April 7
- 2006: 35th annual - April 1
- 2005: 34th annual - April 2
- 2004: 33rd annual - April 3
- 2003: 32nd annual - April 5
