= Perry Bullard =

American politician

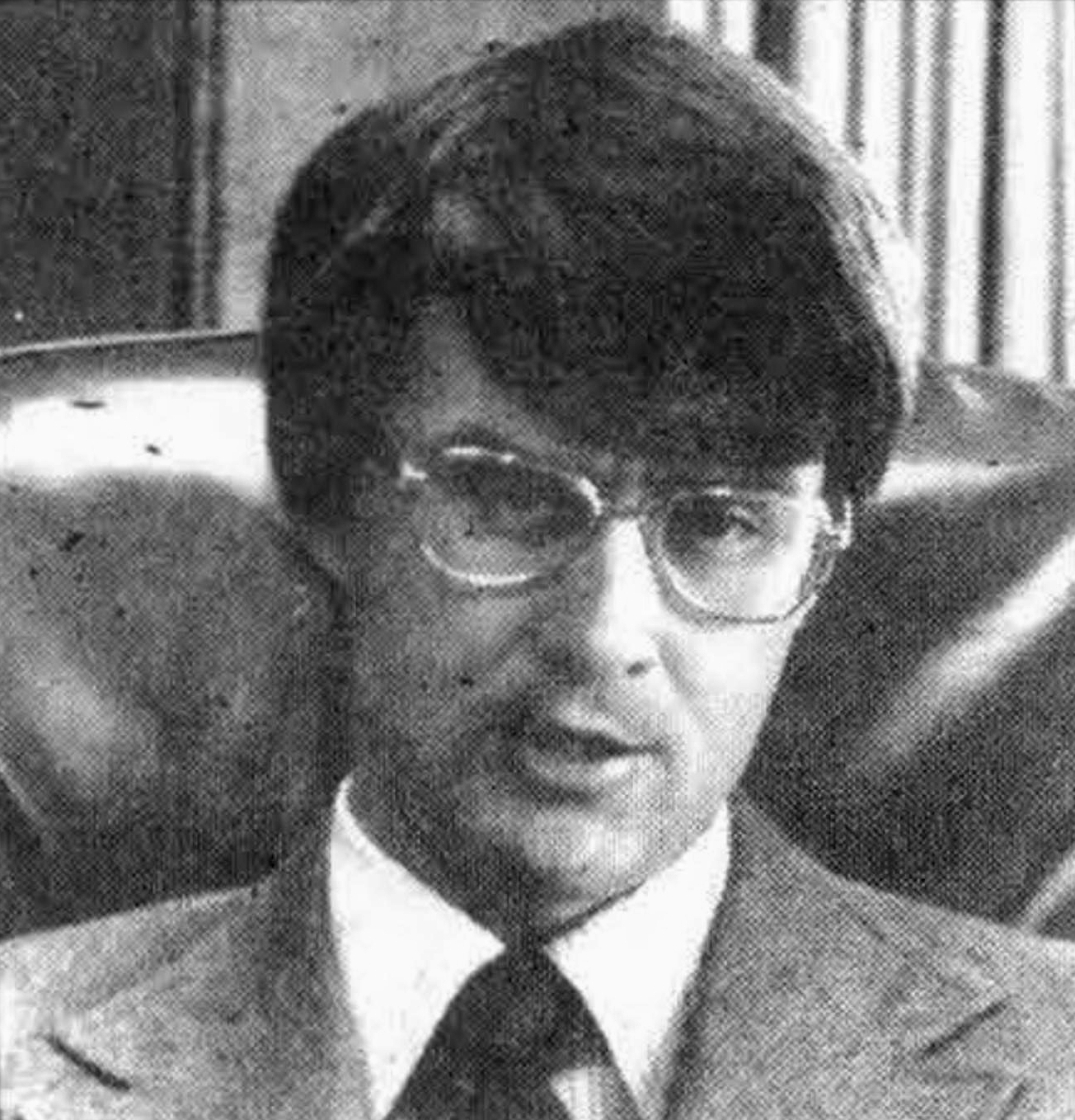
- Bullard c. 1980

Member of the Michigan House of Representatives from the 53rd district
- In office January 1, 1973 – December 31, 1992
- Preceded by: Raymond J. Smit
- Succeeded by: Lynn N. Rivers

Personal details
- Born: September 2, 1942 Cleveland, Ohio, U.S.
- Died: October 15, 1998 (aged 56) Canton, Michigan, U.S.
- Party: Democratic
- Education: Harvard University; University of Michigan Law School

Military service
- Allegiance: United States
- Branch/service: United States Navy
- Years of service: 1966–1967
- Battles/wars: Vietnam War

Winston Perry Bullard (September 2, 1942 – October 15, 1998), was a Democratic politician and lawyer in Ann Arbor, Michigan.

== Biography ==
Bullard was born in Cleveland, Ohio and attended Harvard University. After serving in the United States Navy during the Vietnam War, he obtained his law degree from the University of Michigan Law School. He then ran successfully for the Michigan House of Representatives in 1972. He continued to hold his 53rd district seat, representing Ann Arbor, until 1993.

Bullard was known for his strongly liberal stances and his passion for defending and expanding personal civil liberties. He was one of a few members of the Democratic Socialists of America to be elected to public office.

According to the Associated Press, Bullard was part of a group of young liberal representatives who, during the 1970s, were known as the "Kiddie Caucus"; other members included David Hollister of Lansing and Morris Hood of Detroit. Early in his tenure, Bullard was the subject of criticism after he was photographed using marijuana at the second annual Hash Bash, a rally promoting less restrictive marijuana laws. Bullard told reporters who surrounded him as he smoked that "there's nothing wrong with it." Bullard eventually came to chair the state house Judiciary Committee. He sponsored the Open Meetings Act, the Michigan Freedom of Information Act, and blocked legislation that would have brought the death penalty to the state of Michigan, which abolished it in 1846, and loosened requirements for police wiretaps. A decorated naval veteran of the Vietnam War, in which he served in 1966–67, he later renounced his 13 medals at an antiwar rally.

During the 1990s, after retiring from the state legislature, Bullard ran unsuccessfully for a state judgeship.

Bullard and his wife moved to Port St. Lucie, Florida in 1996, but both returned to Michigan in 1998. Bullard died in Canton Township, Michigan on October 15, 1998.

== See also ==
- List of Democratic Socialists of America who have held office in the United States

Preceded by Raymond J. Smit (R)	State Representative for Michigan's 53rd District; 1973–1993	Succeeded by Lynn N. Rivers (D)
