= Jeff Irwin (politician) =

American politician (born 1977)

Member of the Michigan Senate
- Incumbent
- Assumed office January 1, 2019
- Preceded by: Rebekah Warren
- Constituency: 18th district (2019–2022); 15th district (2023– )

Member of the Michigan House of Representatives from the 53rd district
- In office January 1, 2011 – January 1, 2017
- Preceded by: Rebekah Warren
- Succeeded by: Yousef Rabhi

Personal details
- Born: June 19, 1977 (age 49) Petoskey, Michigan, U.S.
- Party: Democratic
- Spouse: Kathryn
- Children: 2
- Education: University of Michigan

Jeff Irwin (born June 19, 1977) is an American activist, progressive and politician serving as a member of the Michigan Senate. A member of the Democratic Party, he served on the Washtenaw County Board of Commissioners from 1999 to 2010, and in the Michigan House of Representatives from 2011 to 2017.

From 2019 to 2022, in the Michigan Senate, he represented the 18th Senate district, which encompassed the cities of Ann Arbor, Saline, Ypsilanti, and Milan (portion) and the townships of Ann Arbor, Pittsfield, York, Augusta, Salem, Superior, and Ypsilanti. He replaced Rebekah Warren, who was term limited.

Irwin now represents the state senate's 15th district since the redistricting implemented in 2022. The 15th Senate district since 2022 encompasses the southern part of Washtenaw County, including part of Ann Arbor and all of Saline and Ypsilanti, as well as small parts of Lenawee County, and Monroe county.

== Early life and education ==
Irwin was born in Petoskey, Michigan in 1977 and resided in Sault Ste. Marie with his parents, Cynthia Williams and Mitch Irwin. His father, Mitch Irwin, was a state senator from that area from 1979-1990. His mother, Cynthia Williams, was a labor lawyer and CEO of MESSA. He graduated from East Lansing High School in 1995. After graduating from high school, he moved to Washtenaw County in 1995 to attend college at the University of Michigan. He graduated with a bachelor's degree in political science. Irwin lives in Ann Arbor and currently lives in Ward 3 with his wife, Kathryn, and their two children, Sylvia and Mackinac.

Prior to becoming an elected official, Irwin worked as a legislative aide to then State Senator Alma Wheeler-Smith. He also worked for the League of Conservation Voters Education Fund, organizing programs for local environmental and conservation organizations. After several years working at LCVEF, Irwin served as Executive Director for the Michigan League of Conservation Voters, advocating for clean air and clean water policies and holding elected officials accountable for their voting records in the state legislature.

== Public service ==
=== Washtenaw County Commission ===
Elected as a Washtenaw County Commissioner at age 22 in 1999, Irwin served for 11 years in Washtenaw County Government. On the commission, he was instrumental in building a new homeless shelter, increasing funding for human services and affordable housing, instituting a living wage policy, and helping to create the Washtenaw Health Plan, which extended health insurance to uninsured workers prior to the Affordable Care Act.

For his work, the Michigan Jaycees, a group providing development opportunities that empower young people to create positive change, named him “Best Young Government Leader of the Year” in 2000.

=== House of Representatives ===
After 6 terms on the County Commission, Irwin ran for Michigan’s 53rd House District in 2010. He was sworn in as a State Representative in 2011 and won 3 successive terms before being prohibited from running again due to term limits. As a State Representative, Irwin primarily focused on securing additional education funding for Michigan’s students, increasing healthcare coverage, criminal justice reform, and introducing legislation to protect the environment and natural resources. Irwin helped pass Medicaid expansion, extending Medicaid coverage to hundreds of thousands of Michiganders. He led opposition against fracking and in favor of clean energy, and introduced the first legislation to shut down Enbridge’s “Line 5”, a pipeline that runs through the Straits of Mackinac in Lake Michigan. Irwin also led the introduction of cannabis legalization and asset forfeiture reform.

In 2012, Irwin and five of his House Democratic colleagues filed a suit against the, at the time, Michigan House Republican Speaker Jase Bolger, Floor Leader Jim Stamas and Speaker Pro Tem John Walsh. This suit was in response to the passage of controversial legislation affecting graduate research assistants and the collection of union dues by public employers, and changes to the rules about petition signatures and ballot initiatives. The suit alleged that Republicans were violating the Michigan State Constitution by not granting requests for recorded roll call votes on whether legislation should take immediate effect.

The Ingham Circuit Court initially ruled in favor of Irwin and his colleagues granting an injunction against the legislation in question. This ruling was appealed to the Michigan Court of Appeals which overturned the lower court’s ruling.

In 2013, Irwin introduced a bill that would fully decriminalize marijuana, and sponsored legislation to legalize same-sex marriage in Michigan, recognize same-sex marriages that were licensed in other states, and reverse the state's ban on extending health benefits to domestic partners of public employees. Since introducing legislation on these topics in 2013, Michigan has legalized adult use of cannabis, dramatically reformed civil asset forfeiture, and begun the process to shutdown Line 5.

Irwin was ranked as the most liberal legislator in the Michigan House in 2014.

In 2016, Irwin spearheaded reducing the Michigan Department of Environmental Quality (DEQ) threshold for 1,4 dioxane from 85ppm to 7.2ppm, following the discovery of a family affected by numerous health conditions, found drinking and living with well water with high levels of dioxane. He also organized a DEQ Townhall on dioxane in Ann Arbor, bringing together experts like Roger Rayle, who had been tracking the spread of dioxane in the area for decades, precipitating the EPA SuperFund application by Washtenaw County.

In 2016, Irwin's budget amendment restoring $3.2 million in funding for the “Heat and Eat” program, which leverages federal heating assistance funds (LIHEAP) to qualify food assistance recipients for increased benefits from Supplemental Nutrition Assistance Program (SNAP). This funding helps 160,000 low-income families receive an average of $76 more a month for food benefits .

=== State Senate ===
In October 2017, Irwin announced his candidacy for the Michigan Senate in the 18th District. Other candidates in the Democratic primary were Michelle Deatrick, Anjua Rajendra, and Matt Miller. On August 8, Irwin became the Democratic nominee for state senate in the 18th District.

On November 7, Irwin defeated Martin Church, the Republican Senate nominee, in the general election by 70,271 votes.

As a State Senator, Irwin serves on the Appropriations, Judiciary and Public Safety and Oversight Committees, as well as the Joint Committee on Administrative Rules. In the Appropriations Committee, he serves as minority Vice-Chair of the Universities and Community Colleges subcommittee and on the Health and Human Services and General Government subcommittees.

In the Senate, Irwin has introduced legislation to tighten regulations against polluters, allow more juvenile offenders to seal their records, expunge all cannabis-related offenses, ban PFAS in food packaging and dramatically expand the Earned Income Tax Credit. He was also instrumental in securing statewide funding that increased direct care workers’ wages by $2.35.

During the 2019-2020 legislative session, five of Irwin’s bills were signed into law. Irwin’s legislation allowing juveniles to expunge traffic offenses and have certain offenses automatically expunged, and limiting the use of bench warrants for first-time failures to appear in court were both signed into law in 2021. So far, during the 2021-2022 legislative session, one of Irwin's bills has been signed into law. Irwin's legislation resolves a major issue that prevented legal Michigan residents from collecting federal pandemic unemployment assistance. This issue also caused the Michigan Unemployment Insurance Agency (UIA) to charge Michigan residents, who had lawfully collected federal pandemic unemployment assistance, with fraud.

In 2022, due to redistricting, Irwin was elected to the state senate's 15th district.

== Political beliefs ==
=== Campaign finance ===
Irwin has been an outspoken critic of public officials accepting and using corporate campaign donations. He strongly supports limiting the amount individuals can give to a political campaign and banning corporate political donations. In the House, Irwin introduced legislation to eliminate "pay-to-play" schemes by limiting the awarding of state contracts to campaign donors.

Following a 2016 investigative report which showed that Michigan lawmakers were evading campaign finance law prohibiting the contribution of corporate funds to individual candidates through a loophole allowing the establishment of a non-profit 527 administrative account that can accept corporate donations, Irwin described these accounts as “undisclosed slush funds”, further saying that candidates “are not allowed to take corporate checks” and even though there is a loophole that “doesn't mean that it's the right thing to do.”

The report had a large corporation that received a state tax-break had donated to a 527 administrative account belonging to the at-the-time Michigan Senate Majority Leader, Arlan Meekhof.

=== Consumer protection ===
As a member of the Michigan Senate, Irwin has introduced legislation that would remove pharmaceutical companies' lawsuit immunity by amending the Michigan Product Liability Act of 1995, saying that the Michigan "legislature took away our right to sue drug manufacturers when their product hurts or kills" consumers. The Michigan Product Liability Act of 1995 is recognized as the strictest product liability law as it grants pharmaceutical companies near absolute immunity from lawsuits. This law prevents residents of Michigan and the Michigan Attorney General from pursuing lawsuits against pharmaceutical companies, like Purdue Pharma and Johnson & Johnson, for their role in the Opioid Epidemic. In 2011, the Michigan Court of Appeals dismissed a lawsuit filed against Merck by former-Attorney General Mike Cox over the arthritis pain medication Vioxx. Vioxx caused heart attacks and strokes.

=== Criminal justice ===
In 2015, Irwin introduced legislation to prohibit civil asset forfeiture in Michigan unless a person is convicted of a crime. Since then, this reform has been made in Michigan law, and further reform has gained widespread support in Michigan.

In 2020, Irwin introduced legislation that would require all police officers, new and current, to receive training on implicit bias and violence de-escalation techniques, as well as take a mental health screening, as a part of their initial training and certification. It passed the Michigan Senate unanimously, but did not pass the Michigan House.

In 2014 and 2021, Irwin introduced legislation that would require parental consent before a child could be used by police as an informant

In 2021, his legislation that greatly expanded expungement for juveniles and automatically expunged certain non-violent offenses committed by juveniles was signed into law by Governor Gretchen Whitmer.

In 2022, Irwin led a bipartisan group of state senators to introduce legislation that would abolish juvenile life without parole in Michigan saying "Michigan law needs to recognize that juvenile offenders deserve a chance at rehabilitation". If passed this legislation would bring Michigan into alignment with the 2012 U.S. Supreme Court ruling in Miller v. Alabama, which held that sentencing juveniles to mandatory life without the possibility of parole is unconstitutional.

=== Education ===
Irwin believes that providing quality, free public education should be the most important priority of Michigan’s government. While serving on the Washtenaw County Board, he helped expand early childhood education. This expansion included the creation of the Eastern Washtenaw Head Start program.

In 2021, Irwin introduced legislation that would impact literacy performance in children, specifically pertaining to screening and treating aspects of dyslexia. The legislation would help identify students who are exhibiting problems with learning language and reading skills, and provide schools and educators with the necessary intervention and tiered support they need to help these students succeed. Irwin also introduced legislation that would prevent and reduce students being removed from school, while ensuring that their due process rights are protected during disciplinary actions.

=== Energy ===
Irwin introduced legislation that would prohibit gas utilities from charging Michigan residents for natural gas that was lost and unaccounted for (LAUF). LAUF gas can occur because of pipeline leaks, variations in temperature and meter reading timings, third-party damage, meter tampering, and/or when repairs and replacements are done to natural gas pipelines. Under Michigan law, natural gas utilities can recover the costs of LAUF gas by including it in consumers' monthly energy bills.

In the Michigan House, he and a bipartisan group of House members introduced "Energy Freedom" legislation that would have created policies for net metering, fair pricing, community-owned energy gardens, and energy grid improvements. This legislation would have also streamlined the process by which individuals, businesses, farmers or places of worship could offset energy costs by generating their own energy. It would have also ensured that energy producers received a fair and competitive price.

=== Environment ===
Irwin was an early and outspoken advocate for the shutdown of Enbridge’s Line 5 that runs through the Straits of Mackinac. After Governor Gretchen Whitmer moved to shut down Line 5, Irwin thanked her for taking action.

He has sponsored legislation to remove Michigan’s cap on residential solar production and require polluters to be held accountable for the cleanup costs of their pollution.

=== Healthcare ===
Irwin believes that everyone deserves access to medical care when they need it. [23] He is a supporter of Medicare for All.

In the Michigan House, Irwin supported the expansion of the Healthy Kids Dental program that now provides dental coverage to all Medicaid-eligible children under age 21 in Michigan, and he was instrumental in the statewide Medicaid expansion.

In 2019, Irwin introduced legislation aimed at reducing violence against nurses and healthcare workers.

During the COVID-19 pandemic, Irwin successfully led efforts to increase direct care workers' wages by $2.35.

=== Labor rights ===
Irwin supports policies that protect workers and wages, including paid time off, one fair wage, expanded parental leave, anti-discrimination in the workplace bills and pay equity. He has also worked against payroll fraud and the employer practice of misclassifying employees as independent contracts.

In 2012, Irwin voted against the legislation that made Michigan a “Right-to-Work” state saying that “the states that have the most dynamic, successful economies are states that respect their workers and that invest in education.”

Irwin supports repealing laws that weaken protections in the Tenure Act that ensure job and retirement security for educators. He opposes requiring schools to bid out and attempt to privatize services in the schools, efforts that increase costs and decreases the quality of the services in the long-term.

=== LGBTQIA+ rights ===
Irwin has been a longtime supporter of LGBTQ+ rights in Michigan. In 2000, Jeff Irwin was instrumental in expanding benefits for Washtenaw County employees to cover domestic partners. He supported marriage equality prior to the Obergefell decision and introduced legislation to make second-parent adoption available to same-sex partners in Michigan.

Irwin has supported numerous legislative attempts to expand the housing and employment protections in the Elliott-Larsen Civil Rights Act to include sexual orientation, gender identity and gender expression. In a 2018 interview, Irwin said that “it should be illegal to fire somebody or to deny them housing because of their gender expression or sexual orientation”.

In 2014, Irwin publicly supported Washtenaw County Clerk, Larry Kestenbaum, against then-Attorney General Bill Schuette’s legal defense of Michigan’s ban on same-sex marriage.

In the Michigan Senate, Irwin continues to sponsor legislation that would expand adoption rights to all LGBT couples in Michigan and is a co-sponsor of current efforts to expand laws preventing discrimination in housing, employment, and public accommodations.

=== Reproductive rights ===
Irwin is a strong supporter of reproductive rights and protecting access to abortion. He has been endorsed by multiple feminist and reproductive rights groups during his time in office. In his 2010 State House primary, Irwin was endorsed by Michigan National Organization for Women. He has also been endorsed by Planned Parenthood Advocates of Michigan in 2010, 2012, 2014 and 2018.

=== Voting rights and elections ===
Irwin has been a longtime supporter of expanding access to the right to vote and improving the system for voters. In the Michigan House, he introduced legislation to allow absentee voting for any reason and opposed efforts to institute strict voter ID laws that would have disenfranchised many elderly and poor voters.

In the Michigan Senate, he is on the Senate Oversight Committee which took testimony from individuals who falsely claimed that there was fraud in the 2020 Presidential Election. The Republican-led committee released a report showing that there was no fraud during or after the election, Irwin said he was glad that Republicans “are finally and definitely putting an end to ‘The Big Lie’ perpetuated by the former president.”

== Electoral history ==
=== 2018 ===
2018 Michigan State Senate, District 18, General Election
Party	Candidate	Vote %	Votes
Democratic	Jeff Irwin	76.6%	96,891
Republican	Martin Church	21%	26,620
Working Class Party	Thomas Repasky	2.3%	2,954
Total Votes			126,465

2018 Michigan State Senate, District 18, Democratic Primary
Candidate	Vote %	Votes
Jeff Irwin	35.6%	19,875
Michelle Deatrick	35.2%	19,634
Anuja Rajendra	26.3%	14,673
Matthew Miller	2.9%	1,597
Total Votes		55,779

=== 2014 ===
2014 Michigan House of Representatives, District 53, General Election
Party	Candidate	Vote %	Votes
Democratic	Jeff Irwin (Incumbent)	82.3%	21,004
Republican	John Spisak	17.7%	4,504
Total Votes			25,508

=== 2012 ===
2012 Michigan House of Representatives, District 53, General Election
Party	Candidate	Vote %	Votes
Democratic	Jeff Irwin (Incumbent)	80.9%	32,576
Republican	John Spisak	19.1%	7,672
Total Votes			40,248

2012 Michigan House of Representatives, District 53, Democratic Primary
Candidate	Vote %	Votes
Jeff Irwin (Incumbent)	88.4%	5,542
Thomas Partridge	11.6%	725
Total Votes		6,267

=== 2010 ===
2010 Michigan House of Representatives, District 53 General Election
Party	Candidate	Votes
Democratic	Jeff Irwin	23,440
Republican	Chad Ingersoll	5,692
Total Votes		29,132
