= John Hieftje =

American politician

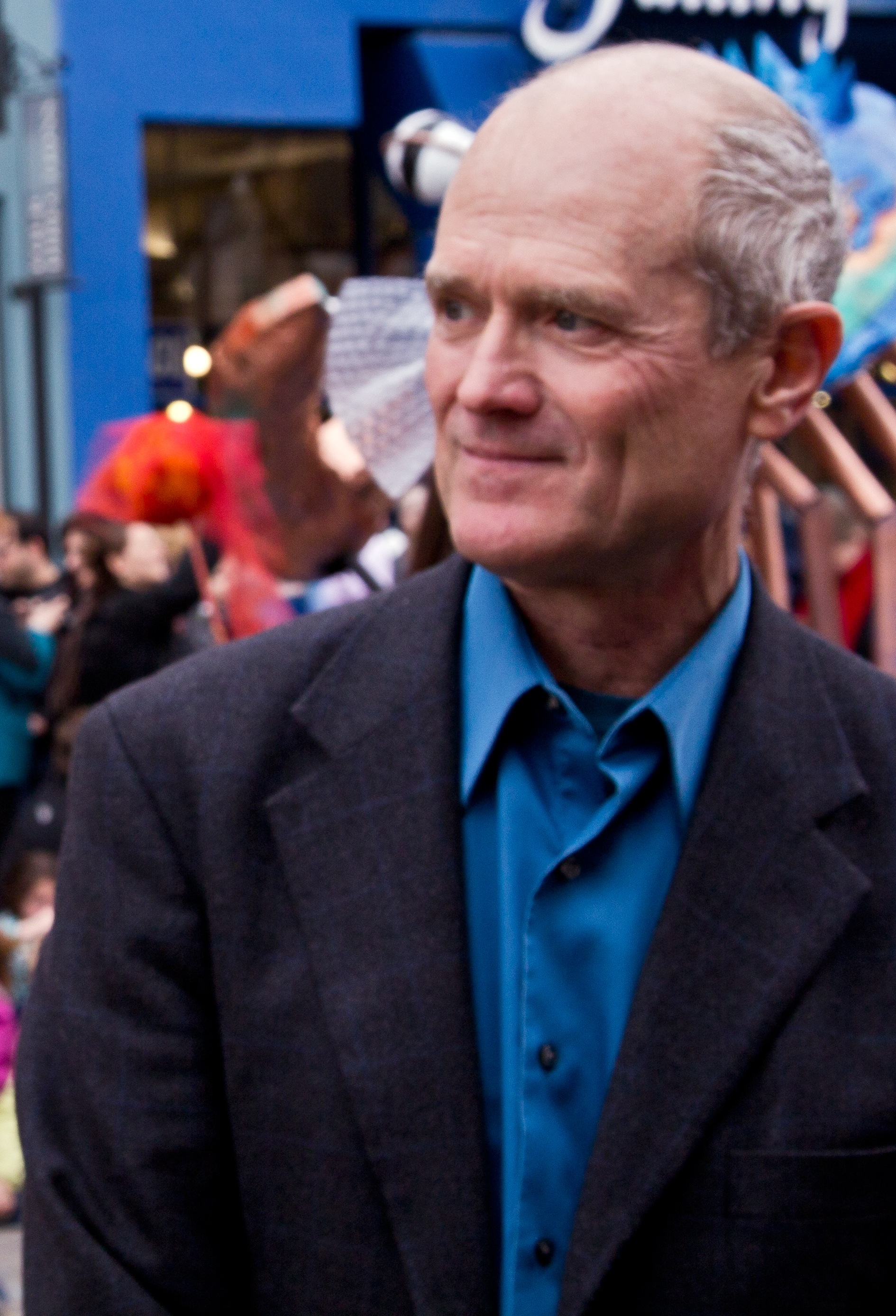
- Hieftje in 2012

60th Mayor of Ann Arbor
- In office November 13, 2000 – November 10, 2014
- Preceded by: Ingrid Sheldon
- Succeeded by: Christopher Taylor

Member of the Ann Arbor City Council from Ward 1
- In office November 8, 1999 – November 13, 2000
- Preceded by: Patricia Vereen-Dixon
- Succeeded by: Robert M. Johnson

Personal details
- Born: Battle Creek, Michigan, U.S.
- Party: Democratic
- Spouse: Kathryn Goodson
- Children: 1
- Education: Eastern Michigan University

John Hieftje (/ˈhiːftjɛ/ HEEFT-yeh, /-dʒə/ -jə) is an American politician who served as the 60th mayor of Ann Arbor, Michigan. Hieftje began his political career in 1999, when he was elected to the city council for Ann Arbor's 1st Ward as a Democrat. He was first as Mayor in 2000, and was re-elected in 2002, 2004, 2006, 2008, 2010 and 2012.

== Early life ==
Hieftje was born in Battle Creek, Michigan and grew up in Ann Arbor. Hieftje worked for the United States Forest Service and as a real estate agent. He graduated from Eastern Michigan University in Ypsilanti, Michigan in 1997.

== Environmentalist stance ==
Hieftje has campaigned as an environmentalist, advocating for various alternative energy, anti-sprawl, and parks measures. The largest of these was a 2003 ballot initiative in which Ann Arbor residents were asked to approve property tax increases to fund the Ann Arbor Parks and Greenbelt Program. This anti-sprawl program called for the purchase of conservation easements on up to 7,000 acres (28 km²) of land in and around the city in order to preserve farmland and open space. On November 4, 2003, Ann Arbor residents approved this program 2-1, generating about $35 million to purchase land.

Hieftje considers himself "an environmentalist and a fiscal conservative."

== Career and awards ==
Hieftje has served on the boards of the Ann Arbor Summer Festival, the Michigan Theater, the Huron River Watershed Council, and the Lake Superior Conservancy and Watershed Council. He has served as Co-Chair of the Washtenaw Metro Alliance and as Chair of Recycle Ann Arbor and of Urban Core Mayors of Michigan. He is a member of the Sierra Club, the Ecology Center of Ann Arbor, and the National Wildlife Federation (Great Lakes Office).

Hieftje has won several awards, including Local Elected Official of the Year Award from the Michigan Recreation and Parks Association, the Conservation Leadership Award from the Greater Detroit Audubon Society, the Conservation Award from the Huron Valley Group of Sierra Club, and the Preservationist of the Year Award from Washtenaw Land Trust.

== Electoral history ==
=== City Council ===
==== 1999 ====
1999 Ann Arbor City Council Ward 1 Democratic primary
Party	Candidate	Votes	%
Democratic	John Hieftje	818	69.91%
Democratic	Simone Lightfoot	350	29.91%
Write-in	Write-ins	2	0.17%
Total votes		1,170	

1999 Ann Arbor City Council Ward 1
Party	Candidate	Votes	%
Democratic	John Hieftje	1,090	87.62%
Libertarian	Charles Goodman	140	11.25%
Write-in	Write-ins	14	1.13%
Total votes		1,244	

=== Mayor ===
==== 2000 ====
2000 Ann Arbor mayoral election
Party	Candidate	Votes	%
Democratic	John Hieftje	34,111	68.34%
Republican	Stephen Rapundalo	13,946	27.94%
Libertarian	Charles Goodman	1,849	3.70%
Write-in	Audrey L. Jackson	9	0.02%

==== 2002 ====
2002 Ann Arbor mayoral election
Party	Candidate	Votes	%
Democratic	John Hieftje (incumbent)	26,495	75.05%
Republican	Marcia Higgins	8,764	24.83%
Write-in	Write-ins	43	0.12%
Total votes		35,302	

==== 2004 ====
2004 Ann Arbor mayoral election
Party	Candidate	Votes	%
Democratic	John Hieftje (incumbent)	38,067	68.65%
Republican	Jane Lumm	17,285	31.17%
Write-in	Write-ins	97	0.17%
Total votes		55,449	

==== 2006 ====
2006 Ann Arbor mayoral election Democratic primary
Party	Candidate	Votes	%
Democratic	John Hieftje (incumbent)	6,703	69.71%
Democratic	Wendy Ann Woods	2,913	30.29%
Write-in	Write-ins	0	0.00%
Total votes		9,616	

2006 Ann Arbor mayoral election
Party	Candidate	Votes	%
Democratic	John Hieftje (incumbent)	30,935	78.88%
Independent	Tom Wall	8,283	21.12%
Write-in	Write-ins	0	0.00%
Total votes		39,218	

==== 2008 ====
2008 Ann Arbor mayoral election
Party	Candidate	Votes	%
Democratic	John Hieftje (incumbent)	46,811	84.94%
Libertarian	Eric Plourde	8,001	14.52%
Write-in	Write-ins	300	0.54%
Total votes		55,112	

==== 2010 ====
2010 Ann Arbor mayoral election Democratic primary
Party	Candidate	Votes	%
Democratic	John Hieftje (incumbent)	10,058	83.91%
Democratic	Patricia Lesko	1,869	15.59%
Write-in	Write-ins	60	0.50%
Total votes		11,987	

2010 Ann Arbor mayoral election
Party	Candidate	Votes	%
Democratic	John Hieftje (incumbent)	27,957	81.99%
Independent	Steve Bean	5,983	17.55%
Write-in	Write-ins	159	0.47%
Total votes		34,099	

==== 2012 ====
2012 Ann Arbor mayoral election
Party	Candidate	Votes	%
Democratic	John Hieftje (incumbent)	42,262	84.11%
Independent	Albert Howard	7,652	15.23%
Write-in	Write-ins	335	0.67%
Total votes		50,249	

Political offices
Preceded by Ingrid Sheldon	Mayor of Ann Arbor, Michigan; 2000–2014	Succeeded by Christopher Taylor
