= Michigan's 53rd House of Representatives district =

American legislative district

Michigan's 53rd State House of Representatives district
Representative
Brenda Carter; D–Pontiac
- Demographics: 41.5% White; 30.3% Black; 18% Hispanic; 3.5% Asian; 0.2% Native American; 0.6% Other; 5.9% Multiracial
- Population (2024): 94,533

Michigan's 53rd House of Representatives district is a legislative district within the Michigan House of Representatives located in Oakland County. The district was created in 1965, when the Michigan Supreme Court ordered the reapportionment of state legislative districts from a county-based system to a proportional one following the Supreme Court case Reynolds v. Sims. It is currently represented by Democrat Brenda Carter of Pontiac.

== List of representatives ==
Representative	Party	Years	Residence	Notes
Marvin L. Esch	Republican	1965–1966	Ann Arbor	
Raymond J. Smit	Republican	1967–1972	Ann Arbor	
Perry Bullard	Democratic	1973–1992	Ann Arbor	
Lynn N. Rivers	Democratic	1993–1994	Ann Arbor	
Elizabeth Brater	Democratic	1995–2000	Ann Arbor	
Chris Kolb	Democratic	2001–2006	Ann Arbor	
Rebekah Warren	Democratic	2007–2010	Ann Arbor	
Jeff Irwin	Democratic	2011–2016	Ann Arbor	
Yousef Rabhi	Democratic	2017–2022	Ann Arbor	
Brenda Carter	Democratic	2023–present	Pontiac	

== Historical district boundaries ==
Map	Description	Apportionment Plan	Notes
	Washtenaw County (part): Ann Arbor; Ann Arbor Township	1964 Apportionment Plan	
	Washtenaw County (part): Ann Arbor; Ann Arbor Township (part); Pittsfield Township (part)	1972 Apportionment Plan	
	Washtenaw County (part): Ann Arbor (part); Ann Arbor Township	1982 Apportionment Plan	
	Washtenaw County (part): Ann Arbor (part); Ann Arbor Township (part); Pittsfield Township	1992 Apportionment Plan	
	Washtenaw County (part): Ann Arbor (part); Ann Arbor Township (part); Pittsfield Township (part); Scio Township (part)	2001 Apportionment Plan	
	Washtenaw County (part): Ann Arbor (part); Ann Arbor Township (part); Pittsfield Township (part); Scio Township (part)	2011 Apportionment Plan	
	Oakland County (part): Auburn Hills (part); Pontiac; Waterford Township (part)	2021 Apportionment Plan (Note: Referred to as the Hickory plan.)	

== Recent elections ==
=== 2020s ===
2026 Michigan House of Representatives election
Party	Candidate	Votes	%
Democratic	Brenda Carter (incumbent)	23,234	71.52
Republican	Melissa Schultz	9,253	28.48
Total votes		32,487	100
Democratic hold			

2024 Michigan House of Representatives election
Party	Candidate	Votes	%
Democratic	Brenda Carter (incumbent)	25,432	65.85
Republican	Melissa Schultz	13,189	34.15
Total votes		38,621	100
Democratic hold			

2022 Michigan House of Representatives election
Party	Candidate	Votes	%
Democratic	Brenda Carter	18,829	67.44
Republican	Anthony M. Bartolotta	9,092	32.56
Total votes		27,921	100
Democratic hold			

2020 Michigan House of Representatives election
Party	Candidate	Votes	%
Democratic	Yousef Rabhi (incumbent)	42,524	86.85
Republican	Jean E. Holland	6,436	13.15
Total votes		48,960	100
Democratic hold			

=== 2010s ===
2018 Michigan House of Representatives election
Party	Candidate	Votes	%
Democratic	Yousef Rabhi	33,701	86.87
Republican	Jean E. Holland	5,095	13.13
Total votes		38,796	100
Democratic hold			

2016 Michigan House of Representatives election
Party	Candidate	Votes	%
Democratic	Yousef Rabhi	35,502	80.40%
Republican	Samuel Bissell	7,176	16.25%
Green	Joseph Stevens	1,476	3.34%
Total votes		44,154	100.00%
Democratic hold			

2014 Michigan House of Representatives election
Party	Candidate	Votes	%
Democratic	Jeff Irwin	20,997	82.34
Republican	John Spisak	4,504	17.66
Total votes		25,501	100.0
Democratic hold			

2012 Michigan House of Representatives election
Party	Candidate	Votes	%
Democratic	Jeff Irwin	32,576	80.93
Republican	John Spisak	7,672	19.07
Total votes		40,248	100.0
Democratic hold			

2010 Michigan House of Representatives election
Party	Candidate	Votes	%
Democratic	Jeff Irwin	23,436	80.46
Republican	Chase Ingersoll	5,692	19.54
Total votes		29,128	100.0
Democratic hold			

2008 Michigan House of Representatives election
Party	Candidate	Votes	%
Democratic	Rebekah Warren	37,834	78.31
Republican	Christina Brewton	8,281	17.14
Green	Matt Erard	2,199	4.55
Total votes		48,314	100.0
Democratic hold			
