= List of mayors of Ann Arbor, Michigan =

This is a list of mayors of Ann Arbor, Michigan, beginning with Ann Arbor's incorporation as a city on April 4, 1851.

Mayors of Ann Arbor
Image	Mayor	Years	Political party
	George Sedgwick	1851–1855	Whig
	James Kingsley	1855–1856	Democratic
	William S. Maynard	1856–1858	
	Philip Bach	1858–1859	Republican
	Robert J. Barry	1859–1861	Republican
	John F. Miller	1861–1862	Democratic
	Charles Spoor	1862–1863	
	Ebenezer Wells	1863–1865	Democratic
	William S. Maynard	1865–1866	
	Oliver M. Martin	1866–1868	Republican
	Christian Eberbach	1868–1869	Republican
	Alfred H. Partridge	1869–1870	
	William D. Harriman	1870–1871	Democratic
	Silas H. Douglass	1871–1873	
	Hiram J. Beakes	1873–1875	Democratic
	Edward D. Kinne	1875–1877	Republican
	Densmore Cramer	1877–1878	Democratic
	Willard B. Smith	1878–1880	Republican
	John Kapp	1880–1883	Democratic
	William D. Harriman	1883–1885	Democratic
	John Kapp	1885–1886	Democratic
	John J. Robison	1886–1887	Democratic
	Willard B. Smith	1887–1888	Republican
	Samuel W. Beakes	1888–1890	Democratic
	Charles H. Manly	1890–1891	Democratic
	William G. Doty	1891–1893	Democratic
	Bradley M. Thompson	1893–1894	Democratic
	Cyrenus G. Darling	1894–1895	Republican
	Warren E. Walker	1895–1897	Republican
	Charles E. Hiscock	1897–1899	Republican
	Gottlob Luick	1899–1901	Democratic
	Royal S. Copeland	1901–1903	Republican
	Arthur Brown	1903–1905	Democratic
	Francis M. Hamilton	1905–1907	Republican
	James C. Henderson	1907–1909	Democratic
	William L. Walz	1909–1913	Democratic
	Robert G. MacKenzie	1913–1915	Republican
	Charles A. Sauer (died in office)	1915	Republican
	Ernst M. Wurster (acting mayor)	1915–1917	Democratic
	Ernst M. Wurster	1917–1921	Democratic
	George E. Lewis	1921–1925	Republican
	Robert A. Campbell	1925–1927	Republican
	Edward W. Staebler	1927–1931	Democratic
	H. Wirt Newkirk	1931–1933	Republican
	Robert A. Campbell	1933–1937	Republican
	Walter C. Sadler	1937–1941	Republican
	Leigh J. Young	1941–1945	Republican
	William E. Brown Jr.	1945–1957	Republican
	Samuel J. Eldersveld	1957–1959	Democratic
	Cecil O. Creal	1959–1965	Republican
	Wendell E. Hulcher	1965–1969	Republican
	Robert J. Harris	1969–1973	Democratic
	James E. Stephenson	1973–1975	Republican
	Albert H. Wheeler	1975–1978	Democratic
	Louis D. Belcher	1978–1985	Republican
	Edward C. Pierce	1985–1987	Democratic
	Gerald D. Jernigan	1987–1991	Republican
	Elizabeth S. Brater	1991–1993	Democratic
	Ingrid B. Sheldon	1993–2000	Republican
	John Hieftje	2000–2014	Democratic
	Christopher Taylor	2014–present	Democratic

== See also ==
- List of City Council members of Ann Arbor, Michigan
