= Christopher Taylor (politician) =

American politician

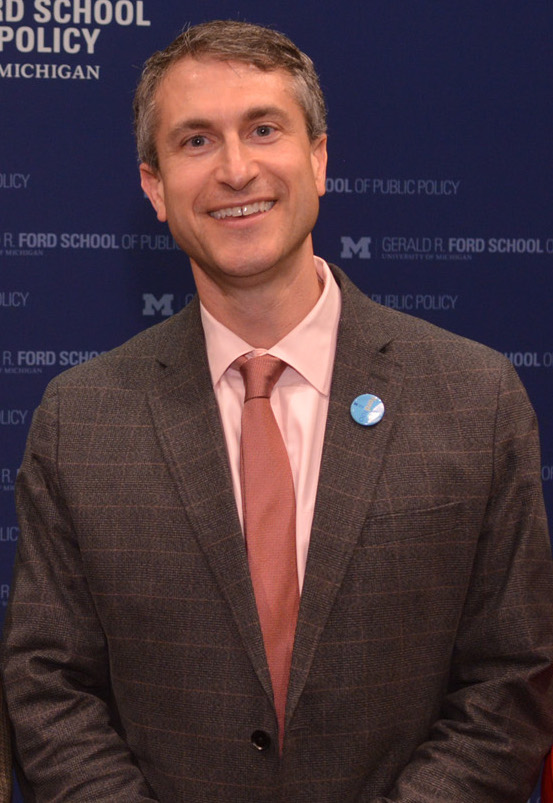
- Taylor, in 2014

61st Mayor of Ann Arbor
- Incumbent
- Assumed office November 10, 2014
- Preceded by: John Hieftje

Member of the Ann Arbor City Council from Ward 3
- In office November 10, 2008 – November 10, 2014
- Preceded by: Stephen Kunselman
- Succeeded by: Julie Grand

Personal details
- Born: 1967 (age 58–59) New York City, New York, U.S.
- Party: Democratic
- Spouse: Eva Rosenwald
- Children: 2
- Education: University of Michigan (BA, BMA, MA, JD)
- Website: City website Campaign website

Christopher Taylor (born 1967) is an American politician and attorney who has served as the 61st mayor of Ann Arbor, Michigan since 2014. A member of the Democratic Party, Taylor served from 2008 to 2014 as a member of the Ann Arbor City Council.

Taylor received two bachelor's degrees, a master's degree, and a Juris Doctor degree from the University of Michigan. Taylor worked as a corporate and commercial attorney before he was elected to the Ann Arbor City Council in 2008. He served a total of three terms before announcing his mayoral campaign in 2013. He was elected Mayor of Ann Arbor on November 4, 2014. He was re-elected for two more terms as mayor in 2018 and 2022. He ran for reelection in 2026, but was defeated in the primary by Washtenaw County commissioner Yousef Rabhi.

As mayor, Taylor has placed an emphasis on environmental sustainability, infrastructure, and increasing housing density. During his tenure, Ann Arbor has developed an unarmed public safety response program, built thousands of new affordable housing units, developed a Sustainable Energy Utility, and enacted the A2Zero plan for community-wide carbon neutrality by 2030.

== Early life and education ==
Taylor was born in 1967 in New York City, and moved to Illinois with his family in 1976. During his junior and senior years of high school, he attended the Interlochen Arts Academy, near Traverse City, Michigan.

In 1985, Taylor enrolled at the University of Michigan. He graduated from the university with four degrees: a Bachelor of Arts with a major in English, a Bachelor of Musical Arts in vocal performance, a Master of Arts in American history, and a Juris Doctor. He was president of the Inter-Cooperative Council at the University of Michigan, a housing cooperative counting 550 members, and served as editor-in-chief of the Michigan Law Review while attending the University of Michigan Law School.

== Career ==
Taylor is a corporate and commercial attorney, and he practices with the law firm Hooper Hathaway in Ann Arbor. Prior to joining Hooper Hathaway, he worked with Butzel Long, also in Ann Arbor, and Ropes & Gray in Boston; he was additionally a law clerk for Bruce Selya, a judge on the United States Court of Appeals for the First Circuit. Prior to being elected to public office, Taylor served on the boards of directors of the Ann Arbor non-profit organizations 826michigan, Ann Arbor in Concert, and FestiFools.

=== Private legal practice ===
Following his graduation from the University of Michigan Law School in 1997, Taylor was admitted to the Massachusetts bar in 1999. He began his legal career in Boston, practicing with the firm Ropes & Gray. He also served as a law clerk for Judge Bruce M. Selya on the United States Court of Appeals for the First Circuit.

Taylor later returned to Ann Arbor to join the law firm Butzel Long, and subsequently became a partner at Hooper Hathaway, where he currently practices. His legal work focuses primarily on business and commercial law, including intellectual property matters, start-up representation, corporate governance, and estate planning. He represents a variety of clients ranging from start-ups and software developers to manufacturers and non-profits, while also assisting individuals and families with probate and trust administration.

=== City Council ===
In 2008, Taylor ran for Ann Arbor City Council as a Democrat on a platform that included restraining spending, balancing development with the city's character, investing in infrastructure, protecting the city's parks and recreation offerings, and supporting residents. In the election, he defeated fellow Democrat Stephen Kunselman by a two-to-one margin for a seat on the council. Taylor served a total of three terms on Ann Arbor City Council, where he represented the city's Third Ward.

As a Council member, Taylor gained a reputation for supporting Ann Arbor's local crosswalk law, advocating for more commercial and residential recycling, maintaining zoning boundaries and downtown building height limits, opposing digital billboards, and subsidizing public art.

=== Tenure as mayor ===
Taylor was sworn in on November 10, 2014, at the city clerk's office. In a December 2014 interview, he outlined some of the most pressing issues facing the city and his administration: among them, the need for greater residential density downtown, making the city more affordable for the working class, better supporting the arts, and determining the future direction and development of Liberty Plaza, a downtown park.

During his first three terms, Taylor's administration focused heavily on increasing housing density, expanding transit infrastructure, and pursuing carbon neutrality. He frequently navigated a divided City Council, balancing his development priorities against a faction of council members focused on neighborhood preservation and basic infrastructure. Following the 2020 and 2022 council elections, Taylor secured a solid working majority of political allies, allowing him to advance his environmental and housing agenda more aggressively.

In 2024, Taylor and the City Council passed a resolution calling for a cease-fire in the Gaza–Israel conflict, with Taylor saying "when community groups are in deep pain, we speak in support of those who are suffering.”

==== Affordable housing and development ====
Affordable housing and housing density have been central policies for Taylor. As mayor, he has worked to protect renters against “junk waitlist fees" (officially termed pre-tenancy fees) and has helped usher in the construction of over 1,000 new units of affordable housing. Furthermore, Taylor has overseen widespread development projects, including rezoning transit corridors to enable more housing on bus routes, which has greatly increased the overall number of housing units, with over 600 added per-year.

===== 2026 Comprehensive Land Use Plan =====
In March 2026, the Ann Arbor City Council unanimously approved a new Comprehensive Land Use Plan.[20] The plan is intended to increase affordability in the city by changing zoning rules to allow for greater housing density and diversity citywide.

During the plan's drafting phase, Taylor co-sponsored two City Council resolutions in 2025 to shape its development based on community feedback. In April 2025, he sponsored a measure requesting that proposed "low-rise residential" zones be capped at three stories, or 35 feet, to ensure new construction scaled appropriately with existing neighborhoods. In July 2025, Taylor led a second resolution recommending the plan explicitly allow for widespread duplexes and triplexes in residential areas. The July resolution also called for an expedited permitting process alongside specific regulations—such as maximum lot coverage and height limits—to guarantee new developments fit harmoniously within their surrounding neighborhood context.

While the finalized plan received significant support from housing and affordability advocates, critics have expressed concerns that the plan will hurt property values.[21]

==== Sustainability ====
In June 2020, under his leadership, the city adopted the A2Zero plan to reach community-wide net-zero emissions by 2030. As of February 2026, total emissions have declined 15 percent, renewable energy consumption has more than doubled, and residential natural gas consumption has fallen by 28 percent. However, a number of key benchmarks are on track to be missed, a fact that Taylor has said is a result of a lack of cooperation from the federal government during the second presidency of Donald Trump.

In November 2024, in response to outages in the DTE Energy grid and a goal of reduced carbon-emissions, Ann Arbor voters approved a Sustainable Energy Utility (SEU), which was championed by Taylor. As part of the SEU, the city aims to build a local, renewable energy grid that is both cheaper and more reliable for city residents. Ann Arbor residents and businesses will be able to opt-in to use power from the SEU, but the infrastructure, which is planned to include both geothermal power and solar power, will be owned by the city. A pilot program for the SEU is expected to begin in mid-2026.

==== Infrastructure ====
Under Taylor's leadership, the city has devoted tens of millions of dollars to streets, sidewalks and bridges, as well as implemented stormwater management improvements to reduce flooding and eliminated water service lines with lead risks.

==== Public Safety ====
In April 2021, Taylor and the Ann Arbor City Council adopted resolution R-21-129 which began the process of implementing an unarmed crisis response program in the City of Ann Arbor. Instead of sending police officers, the program would send social workers to respond to emergency calls that relate to non-violent mental health issues. As of April 2026, the program is still in development.

In June 2023, Taylor and the City Council enacted an ordinance that restricted the Ann Arbor Police Department from conducting traffic stops for minor violations. The measure was intended to limit police targeting of Black and Latino drivers.

In the wake of the killing of Renee Good and Alex Pretti by U.S. Immigration and Customs Enforcement (ICE) and United States Customs and Border Protection agents in January 2026, Taylor pledged that the city of Ann Arbor would never cooperate with ICE, nor allow city resources to be utilized to support what he described as their “lawless agenda of hate.”

== Personal life ==
Taylor and his wife, Ann Arbor native Eva Rosenwald, live in the Burns Park neighborhood. The couple have two children. Taylor frequently performs with a number of community theaters and local choirs.

== Electoral history ==
=== City Council ===
==== 2008 ====
2008 Ann Arbor City Council Ward 3 Democratic primary
Party	Candidate	Votes	%
Democratic	Christopher Taylor	1,387	63.25%
Democratic	Stephen Kunselman	805	36.71%
Democratic	Write-ins	1	0.05%
Total votes		2,193	

2008 Ann Arbor City Council Ward 3
Party	Candidate	Votes	%
Democratic	Christopher Taylor	9,671	98.93%
Write-in	Write-ins	105	1.07%
Total votes		9,776	

==== 2010 ====
2010 Ann Arbor City Council Ward 3
Party	Candidate	Votes	%
Democratic	Christopher Taylor (incumbent)	5,763	98.09%
Write-in	Write-ins	112	1.91%
Total votes		5,875	

==== 2012 ====
2012 Ann Arbor City Council Ward 3
Party	Candidate	Votes	%
Democratic	Christopher Taylor (incumbent)	9,112	98.59%
Write-in	Write-ins	130	1.41%
Total votes		9,776	

=== Mayor ===
==== 2014 ====
Taylor officially announced his campaign for mayor on December 20, 2013. At the time, he was described as one of then-mayor John Hieftje's closest political allies. Hieftje called Taylor "incredibly competent and highly qualified" and opined that he would "make a fine mayor". In August 2014, Taylor took 47.57% of the vote and the party nomination in the Democratic primary in a highly contested race. On November 4, 2014, Taylor was elected Mayor of Ann Arbor, winning 84.21% and defeating independent candidate Bryan Kelly.

2014 Ann Arbor mayoral election Democratic primary
Party	Candidate	Votes	%
Democratic	Christopher Taylor	7,073	47.57%
Democratic	Sabra Briere	2,971	19.98%
Democratic	Stephen Kunselman	2,448	16.46%
Democratic	Sally Hart Petersen	2,364	15.90%
Democratic	Write-ins	13	0.09%
Total votes		14,869	

2014 Ann Arbor mayoral election
Party	Candidate	Votes	%
Democratic	Christopher Taylor	27,988	84.10%
Independent	Bryan Kelly	5,144	15.46%
Write-in	Write-ins	147	0.44%
Total votes		33,279	

==== 2018 ====
In August 2018, Taylor defeated challenger Jack Eaton in the Democratic primary, winning 58.85% of the vote. He went on to win the November general election with over 96% of the vote.

2018 Ann Arbor mayoral election Democratic primary
Party	Candidate	Votes	%
Democratic	Christopher Taylor (incumbent)	16,869	58.85%
Democratic	Jack Eaton	11,741	40.96%
Democratic	Write-ins	56	0.20%
Total votes		28,666	

2018 Ann Arbor mayoral election
Party	Candidate	Votes	%
Democratic	Christopher Taylor (incumbent)	42,705	96.11%
Write-in	Write-ins	1,729	3.89%
Total votes		44,434	

==== 2022 ====
In August 2022, Taylor defeated challenger Anne Bannister with over 60% of the vote in the Democratic primary, before defeating independent candidate Eric Lipson in the general election with 76.31% of the vote.

2022 Ann Arbor mayoral Democratic primary
Party	Candidate	Votes	%
Democratic	Christopher Taylor (incumbent)	15,310	61.85%
Democratic	Anne Bannister	9,327	37.67%
Write-in	Write-ins	119	0.48%
Total votes		24,756	

2022 Ann Arbor mayoral election
Party	Candidate	Votes	%
Democratic	Christopher Taylor (incumbent)	39,678	76.31%
Independent	Eric Lipson	12,113	23.30%
Write-in	Write-ins	203	0.39%
Total votes		51,994	

==== 2026 ====
In November 2025, Taylor announced he would be seeking a fourth and final term in office. Seeking to become the longest serving mayor in Ann Arbor history. Taylor had said in his next term, he would work to accelerate infrastructure work, expand housing options, and continue to implement a sustainable energy utility to reduce carbon emissions in the community. In the election he faced a challenge from Democratic Socialist and Working Families candidate, Washtenaw County commissioner Yousef Rabhi. In his re-election bid, Taylor was endorsed by Michigan Governor Gretchen Whitmer, U.S. Senator Elissa Slotkin, Laborers' Local 499 and Ironworkers Local 25, as well as State Representatives Jason Morgan, Jennifer Conlin, and Carrie Rheingans and all ten members of Ann Arbor's City Council, as well as former mayor John Hieftje. He lost the primary election to Rabhi, 55% to 45%.

Political offices
Preceded by John Hieftje	Mayor of Ann Arbor; 2014–present	Incumbent
