= Gerald Jernigan =

American politician

Gerald D. Jernigan (1942 in Flint, Michigan – July 18, 2006 in Ann Arbor, Michigan) was mayor of the city of Ann Arbor, Michigan, from 1987 to 1991.

== Political career ==
Jernigan served a four-year stint in the United States Air Force, then earned a B.S. in finance from Michigan State University and an MBA from Western Michigan University. He moved to Ann Arbor in the early 1970s to work as an investment officer at the University of Michigan, where he remained employed until his retirement in 2001.

Jernigan was elected to the Ann Arbor city council from the city's fourth ward in 1982. In 1987, Jernigan ran for Ann Arbor mayor as a moderate Republican. He defeated the perennial conservative mayoral candidate Paul S. Jensen in the Republican primary, and unseated the one-term Democratic incumbent mayor, Edward C. Pierce, in the April election.

Jernigan won reelection as mayor in 1989, beating back a challenge from Democratic candidate Raymond F. Clevenger, who had served as a U.S. Representative from Michigan's 11th district from 1965-67. During his second term, Jernigan successfully spearheaded a voter referendum to raise city penalties for marijuana possession to $25 for a first offense, after calling Ann Arbor's famously lenient "five-dollar pot law" an "embarrassment" to the city.

In 1991, Jernigan ran for a third term as mayor, but was defeated by Democratic city councilwoman Elizabeth Brater, who became Ann Arbor's first female mayor.

In November 2002, Jernigan was elected to a six-year term on the Board of Trustees for Washtenaw Community College. His wife, Carey Jernigan, is the Chief Operating Officer at ReGroup Inc. as of 2005.

On July 18, 2006, Jernigan died at his home in Ann Arbor, after playing a round of golf.

Preceded by Edward C. Pierce	Mayor of Ann Arbor, Michigan; 1987–1991	Succeeded by Elizabeth Brater
