= Elizabeth Brater =

American politician

Liz Brater

Member of the Michigan Senate from the 18th district
- In office January 1, 2003 – December 31, 2010
- Preceded by: Alma Wheeler Smith
- Succeeded by: Rebekah Warren

Member of the Michigan House of Representatives from the 53rd district
- In office January 1, 1995 – December 31, 2000
- Preceded by: Lynn N. Rivers
- Succeeded by: Chris Kolb

58th Mayor of Ann Arbor
- In office 1991–1993
- Preceded by: Gerald D. Jernigan
- Succeeded by: Ingrid Sheldon

Personal details
- Born: April 12, 1951 (age 75) Boston, Massachusetts, U.S.
- Party: Democratic
- Spouse: Enoch Brater
- Education: University of Pennsylvania (BA, MA)
- Profession: Writer, editor, university lecturer

Elizabeth Brater (born April 12, 1951) is a Democratic former member of the Michigan Senate, who represented the 18th district from 2003 to 2010, and served as the Assistant Minority Leader. Her district included the cities of Ann Arbor and Ypsilanti. She was previously a member of the Michigan House of Representatives from 1995 to 2000.

== Early life ==
Brater was born in Boston, Massachusetts. After graduating high school in 1969, she enrolled at the University of Chicago, where she remained for two years, but transferred to the University of Pennsylvania, completing her B.A. in English in 1973. She continued to receive an M.A. in History, magna cum laude, in 1976, and was a member of Phi Beta Kappa. She moved to Ann Arbor, Michigan in 1975, when her husband, Enoch Brater, took a job as an English professor at the University of Michigan. In Ann Arbor, she worked as an editor and writer, also teaching courses on local government and writing at the university. She is Jewish.

== Political career ==
Brater won election as a Democrat to the Ann Arbor city council from the city's Third Ward in 1988. She then ran for mayor of Ann Arbor in April 1991, defeating two-term incumbent Republican mayor Gerald D. Jernigan. Brater was the first woman to be elected mayor of Ann Arbor. As mayor, Brater established the city's extensive recycling program. After serving one two-year term, she was defeated in her mayoral reelection campaign, losing in April 1993 to the Republican challenger, former city council member Ingrid Sheldon, who went on to serve four two-year terms as mayor.

After her mayoral defeat, Brater ran successfully for the Michigan House of Representatives in November 1994. She served in the House from 1995 to 2000, representing Michigan's 53rd district. Term limits prevented Brater from running for a fourth term.

Brater was honored by the Michigan Sierra Club as its 1996 Environmentalist of the Year and by the Alliance for the Mentally Ill of Michigan as its 1998 Legislator of the Year.

In November 2002, Brater won election to the Michigan Senate. In the Democratic primary, she defeated a fellow member of the Michigan House, John Hansen of Dexter. In the general election, she triumphed easily over Republican candidate Gordon Darr, a Scio Township Trustee, and Green Party candidate Elliott Smith. In 2006, she was re-elected with more than 71% of the vote, but in 2010 was term-limited and thus barred from seeking re-election.

== Committees ==
In the Michigan Senate, Brater was a member of the Judiciary and Finance committees, the vice-chair of the Natural Resources and Environmental Affairs and the Agriculture, Forestry and Tourism committees. Brater also served as a member of the Governor's Land Use Leadership Council.

== Electoral history ==
- 2006 Election for the Michigan State Senate - 18th District

Name	Percent
Liz Brater (D)	71.5%
John Kopinski	28.5%

- 2002 Election for the Michigan State Senate - 18th District

Name	Percent
Liz Brater (D)	63.5%
Gordon Darr	33.3%
Elliott Smith (G)	3.2%

Political offices
Preceded by Gerald D. Jernigan	Mayor of Ann Arbor, Michigan; 1991–1993	Succeeded by Ingrid Sheldon
Preceded by Lynn N. Rivers (D)	Michigan House of Representatives, 53rd District; 1995–2001	Succeeded by Chris Kolb (D)
Preceded by Alma Wheeler Smith (D)	Michigan Senate, 18th District; 2003–2010	Succeeded by Rebekah Warren (D)
