= Edward C. Pierce =

American politician

Edward Charles Pierce (3 January 1930 – 4 July 2002) was a politician and physician from the U.S. state of Michigan.

== Life and career ==
Pierce was born in the town of Three Rivers, in St. Joseph County, Michigan. He moved with his family to Ann Arbor, Michigan, in 1940 at the age of ten and, after serving in the U.S. Air Force, studied at the University of Michigan, from which he earned a B.A. degree in 1955 and an M.D. degree in 1959.

Pierce served a two-year term on the Ann Arbor city council from 1964 to 1966. In spring 1967, Pierce made his first bid for the mayoralty of Ann Arbor, winning the Democratic nomination but losing the general election to incumbent Republican mayor Wendell E. Hulcher. In the late 1960s, Pierce also took part in activism against the Vietnam War. (and led the opposition to the Fermi 2 nuclear reactor)

Pierce ran unsuccessfully for the U.S. House of Representatives from Michigan's second district in 1974 and 1976, losing in the Democratic primary on his first attempt, and in the general election on his second attempt to Republican Carl Pursell. He was elected to the Michigan State Senate from the state's eighteenth district in 1978, and held the seat through 1982. In the State Senate, Pierce served as chairman of the Health and Social Services Committee and as vice chairman of the Senate Administration and Rules Committee and the Education Committee.

In 1985, Pierce again ran for Ann Arbor mayor. He won the Democratic nomination by defeating University of Michigan professor Bunyan Bryant, a liberal activist who was bidding to become the city's second African-American mayor, and he subsequently beat out Republican candidate Richard A. Hadler in the general election. Pierce served one two-year term as mayor, from 1985 to 1987, but was defeated in the April 1987 mayoral election by Republican city councilman Gerald D. Jernigan.

In his medical career, Pierce ran an Ann Arbor family practice until his 1996 retirement, served at St. Joseph Mercy Hospital (Michigan) as chair of the Family Practice Department, and established a free medical clinic, the Summit Medical Center, which lasted from 1968 to 1978 and was intended to provide care regardless of patients' ability to pay. In 1996, Pierce co-founded the group Merian's Friends, which promoted the legalization of physician aid in dying for terminally ill patients, and served as its volunteer chairman. The group vigorously campaigned for a 1997 Michigan ballot initiative to legalize the practice, but voters rejected the measure by a considerable margin.

Pierce died in Ann Arbor in 2002 and is survived by three daughters, Lynne, Amy and Jan, and one son, Paul. Lynne Pierce, a lawyer in Wayne County, Michigan, was elected to the Third Judicial Circuit Court of Michigan in 2008. Jan Pierce White founded the Boys & Girls Club of Rohnert Park, California in 1991. She is a guest teacher for Sonoma County schools as well as a singer/songwriter and judge for West Coast Songwriters. When last heard from Amy and Paul both lived in Florida.

Preceded by Louis D. Belcher	Mayor of Ann Arbor, Michigan; 1985–1987	Succeeded by Gerald D. Jernigan
