= Ann Arbor Summer Festival =

Annual event

Coordinates: 42.27896°N 83.73899°W

Ann Arbor Summer Festival (A2SF)
- Genre: performing arts, multidisciplinary, storytelling, music, circus, performance art, wellness, fitness,
- Dates: Daily beginning the second Friday of June (dark on Mondays)
- Location: Ann Arbor, Michigan
- Years active: 1984–
- Website: www.a2sf.org/

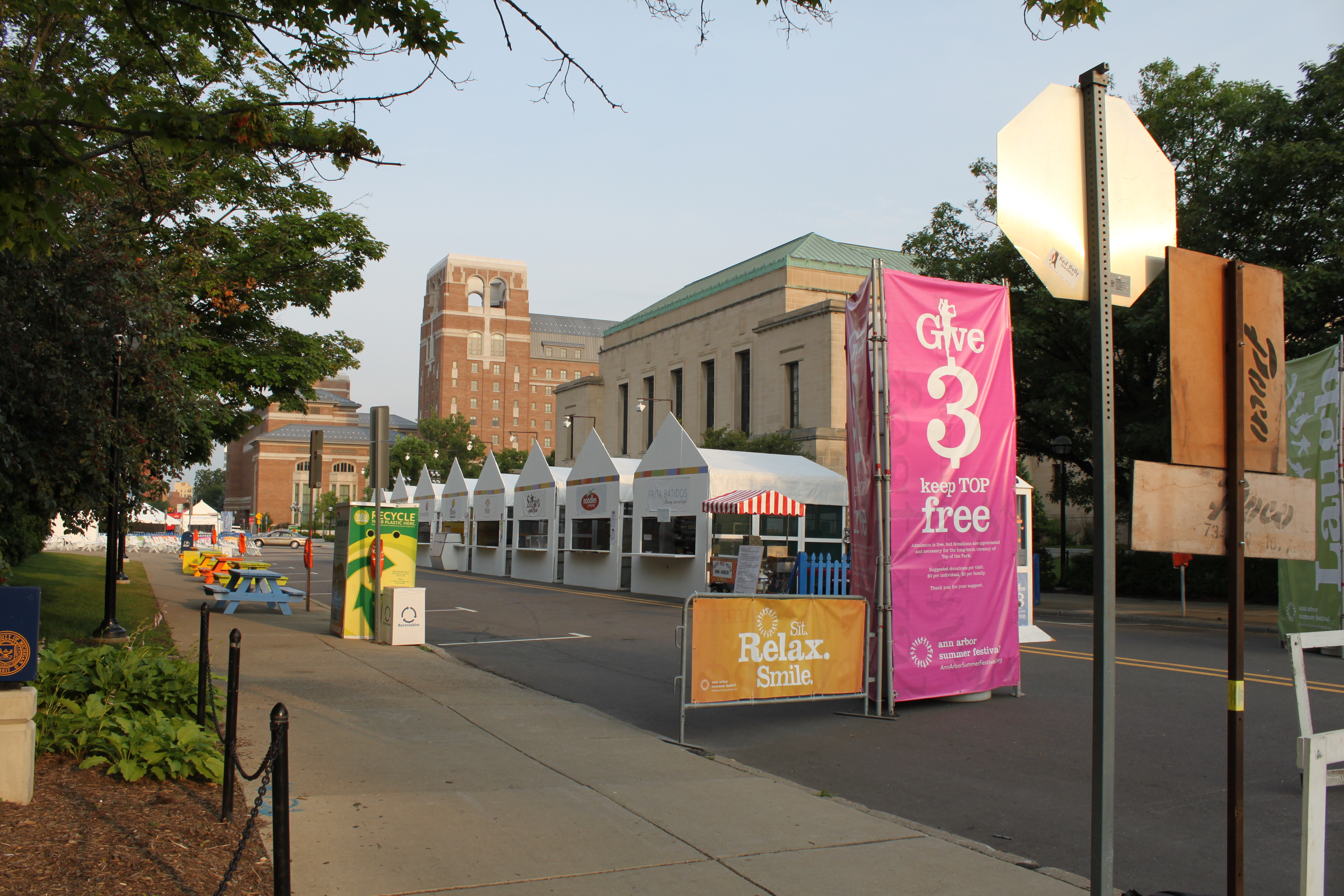
Food vendor booths on East Washington in front of Rackham building

The Ann Arbor Summer Festival (A2SF) is a nearly four-week festival each June that attracts a diverse audience of over 80,000 people and offers over 200 concerts, art exhibitions, kids activities, spectacle, and film screenings, as well as presenting 'experiences' throughout the year.

== History ==
Founded by Eugene Power, and established as partnership between the City of Ann Arbor and the University of Michigan, early seasons emphasized classical music and theater, but have since become more popular and diverse in nature, encompassing a breadth of performance genres. Today, the June festival offers two concurrent series. The outdoor centerpiece at Top of the Park offers admission-free concerts, movies, open-air spectacles, and family attractions held along a U-M campus green. The indoor, ticketed series features contemporary performance.

In addition to its mainstream presentations and regional artists, outdoor installations and performance offerings have included Australia's Strange Fruit, The Architects of Air, Transe Express, Wild bytes’ Superhero, The Dream Engine, Erth's Dinosaurs, Close Act Theatre's Saurus, Polyglot's Tangle, The Water Balloon Gladiators, David Zinn, March Fourth!, and Mucca Pazza.
