= List of Eastern Michigan University people =

This is a list of notable individuals who currently have or previously had an association with Eastern Michigan University. Eastern Michigan University was formerly known as Michigan State Normal School, Michigan State Normal College, and Eastern Michigan College.

== Notable alumni ==
=== Academia ===
- Charles Eugene Beatty – pioneer of Head Start educational program
- Gerry W. Beyer – Governor Preston E. Smith Regents Professor of Law at Texas Tech University School of Law
- Andrew Blackbird – historian and Ottawa tribe leader
- Lee E. Brasseur – Illinois State University professor, author and expert in field of visualization
- Nancy Jane Dean – Presbyterian missionary in Persia, head of the Fiske Seminary at Urmia
- Andrew Foster – first black deaf person to earn master's degree
- Elizabeth Wells Gallup – educator and exponent of Baconian theory of Shakespearian authorship
- Glenn Goerke – former president/chancellor of University of Houston, Houston-Clear Lake, Houston-Victoria, Indiana University East
- Jackie Jenkins-Scott – President of Wheelock College
- Elfrieda Knaak – schoolteacher
- Michael D. Knox (BA 1968) – chair and CEO of the US Peace Memorial Foundation and Distinguished Professor, University of South Florida
- William McAndrew – educator who served as superintendent of Chicago Public Schools
- Charles Edward St. John – astronomer
- Larry Soderquist – corporate and securities law expert, author, and Vanderbilt University professor

=== Arts, media, and entertainment ===
- Nagarjuna Akkineni – Indian actor
- John Edward Ames – novelist and short story writer
- Kim Antieau – novelist
- Martha E. Cram Bates (1839–1905) – writer, journalist, newspaper editor
- Dave Coverly – syndicated cartoonist of Speed Bump
- Warren Defever – rock musician
- Ryan Drummond – voice actor and comedian
- Loren D. Estleman – detective fiction and Western fiction writer
- Dann Florek – actor (Law & Order, Law & Order: Special Victims Unit)
- Zonya Foco – dietitian and author
- Gwen Frostic – artist
- John Hammink – musician, writer and linguist
- John Heffron – winner of NBC's Last Comic Standing 2 in 2004
- Eric Jackson – Panamanian journalist and radio talk show host
- Ella Joyce – stage actress
- Edward Knight – composer
- Greg Mathis – judge; TV personality of Judge Mathis
- Winsor McCay – pioneering cartoonist
- Josef Norris – artist and convicted felon
- Ann Purmell – children's author
- Gary Reed – comic book writer
- Michealene Cristini Risley – author, writer, award-winning director, blogger for the Huffington Post, producer of Tapestries of Hope
- Geo Rutherford – artist and TikToker
- Kevin Saunderson – DJ and producer, one of The Belleville Three, pioneers of Detroit techno
- Anouar H. Smaine – film director, producer, writer and actor
- Joseph Sobran – libertarian, author and syndicated columnist
- Philip Southern – photographer, winner of the 2009 YOBI.tv Pics grand prize
- Afton Williamson – actor, (The Rookie, Homeland, The Breaks, Banshee)
- Daniela Yaniv-Richter – Israeli ceramist and sculptor

=== Business ===
- Mohammed Al Gergawi – United Arab Emirates business leader
- Rufus T. Bush – 19th-century oil refining industrialist and yachtsman
- Ron Campbell – CEO of Tampa Bay Lightning of the National Hockey League
- Jesse Divnich – gaming and financial media industry executive, and co-founder of The simExchange and V.P. of EEDAR
- Bruce T. Halle – founder of Discount Tire Co., the largest independent tire dealer in North America
- John Harvey Kellogg – co-founder of the Kellogg Company; co-creator of corn flakes
- Michael G. Morris – president and CEO of American Electric Power
- Jack Roush – CEO and owner of Roush Racing NASCAR; chairman of the board of Roush Enterprises
- Kevin Saunderson – record producer
- Larry Warren – CEO of Howard University Hospital
- Elle Simone – chef, culinary producer, test cook, and food stylist
- Chuku Wachuku – Nigerian economist and management specialist
- Mary Collins Whiting (1835–1912) – lawyer, businesswoman, teacher

=== Politics, government, and armed forces ===
- Vallateen Virginia Dudley Abbington – African-American activist, educator, and social worker known for being the plaintiff in Abbington v. Board of Education of Louisville
- Edward P. Allen – Republican congressman from Michigan's 2nd congressional district
- Rick Baccus – US Army brigadier general
- Leland W. Carr – Michigan Supreme Court justice 1945–1963
- William W. Chalmers – U.S. representative from Ohio's 9th congressional district and president of the University of Toledo
- Brenda Clack – Democratic member of the Michigan State House of Representatives representing Genesee County
- Owen Cleary – chair of the Michigan Republican Party 1949–1953; Michigan secretary of state 1953–1954; unsuccessful Michigan gubernatorial candidate
- John G. Coburn – four-star general; commander of U.S. Army Materiel Command; chairman and CEO of VT Systems, Inc.
- Dr. Royal S. Copeland – mayor of Ann Arbor, Michigan; senator from New York
- Agnes Dobronski – Michigan legislator and educator
- Frederick B. Fancher – politician; seventh governor of North Dakota
- William Horace Frankhauser – Republican U.S. representative from Michigan's 3rd congressional district
- Barbara Gervin-Hawkins – Democratic member of the Texas House of Representatives
- Fred W. Green – mayor of Ionia, Michigan; 31st governor of Michigan 1927–1931
- Freman Hendrix – former chief of staff and deputy mayor of Detroit under former Mayor Dennis Archer; 2005 mayoral candidate in Detroit
- Dennis M. Hertel – Democratic congressman from Michigan's 14th congressional district
- John Hieftje – mayor of Ann Arbor, Michigan
- William H. Hinebaugh – Progressive congressman from Illinois, assistant attorney general of Illinois, and later president and general counsel of the Central Life Insurance Co., of Illinois
- George H. Hopkins – Civil War veteran, chair of the Michigan Republican Party and Republican congressman for Michigan
- Harry Humphries – United States Navy SEAL member of Richard Marcinko Seal Team 6; tactical instructor with Advanced Hostage Rescue Team at EMU
- Patrick H. Kelley – Republican U.S. representative from Michigan's 6th congressional district
- Marilyn Jean Kelly – Michigan Supreme Court chief justice 2008–present
- Sandra Love – Democratic representative in the New Jersey General Assembly
- Alfred Lucking – Democratic U.S. representative from Michigan's 1st congressional district
- Eduardo Maruri – former president of the Barcelona Sporting Club soccer team from Ecuador; former president of the Guayaquil Chamber of Commerce; founder of the UNO political party; former assembly member representing Guayas Province in the Ecuadorian Constituent Assembly
- Bill Patmon – Democratic member of Ohio House of Representatives
- Charles E. Potter – U.S. senator from Michigan
- Carl D. Pursell – Republican U.S. representative from Michigan's 2nd congressional district
- Marvin B. Rosenberry – chief justice of the Wisconsin Supreme Court
- Ingrid Sheldon – mayor of Ann Arbor, Michigan
- Rodney E. Slater – U.S. secretary of transportation under President Bill Clinton
- Henry F. Thomas – Republican U.S. representative from Michigan's 4th congressional district
- Frank W. Wheeler – Republican U.S. representative from Michigan's 10th congressional district and founder of Saginaw Shipbuilding Company

=== Sports and athletics ===
==== Baseball ====
- Brian Bixler – Major League Baseball player for the Houston Astros
- Jean Cione – All-American Girls Professional Baseball League player
- Terry Collins – Major League Baseball manager for the New York Mets
- Sam Delaplane (born 1995) – professional baseball pitcher
- Chris Hoiles – Major League Baseball player for the Baltimore Orioles, 1989–1998
- Bob Owchinko – Major League Baseball player
- Pat Sheridan – Major League Baseball player
- Matt Shoemaker – Major League Baseball player for the Los Angeles Angels
- Jim Snyder – Major League Baseball player, coach and manager
- Bob Welch – Major League Baseball pitcher, two-time All-Star, Cy Young Award winner (1990), and best-selling author

==== Basketball ====
- Earl Boykins – National Basketball Association (NBA) player, formerly for the Houston Rockets
- Laurie Byrd – basketball coach
- Fred Cofield – NBA player for the New York Knicks and Chicago Bulls
- Derrick Dial – NBA player, formerly with the San Antonio Spurs, New Jersey Nets and Orlando Magic
- Jessie Evans – University of San Francisco basketball coach
- Frank Douglas Garrett – All-America Basketball, Christian author, academic dean
- George Gervin – Hall of Famer of the National Basketball Association
- Stan Heath – head basketball coach, formerly with University of Arkansas and University of South Florida
- Grant Long – retired NBA player
- Harvey Marlatt – NBA player for the Detroit Pistons
- Kennedy McIntosh – 1970s NBA player for the Chicago Bulls and Seattle SuperSonics
- Charles Thomas – retired basketball player for the Detroit Pistons

==== Football ====
- John Banaszak – Pittsburgh Steelers defensive end and three-time Super Bowl champion
- Charlie Batch – National Football League (NFL) player, formerly with the Pittsburgh Steelers
- Ronald Beard – coach for the Prairie View A&M University Panthers
- David Boone – All-Star Canadian Football League defensive lineman
- Maxx Crosby – NFL player, Pro bowler Las Vegas Raiders
- Lional Dalton – player for the Houston Texans
- Éric Deslauriers – Canadian football Director of Football Operations for the Montreal Alouettes
- Ron Fernandes – NFL player
- Matt Finlay – Canadian football linebacker for the Calgary Stampeders
- Reggie Garrett – Pittsburgh Steelers wide receiver
- T. J. Lang – offensive lineman for the Detroit Lions
- Jereme Perry – defensive back for Cleveland Browns
- Chris Roberson – NFL player
- L. J. Shelton – offensive tackle for four NFL teams
- Barry Stokes – NFL player
- Bob Sutton – NFL defensive coordinator, currently with the Kansas City Chiefs
- Kevin Walter – NFL player, formerly with Houston Texans
- Andrew Wylie – NFL player, two-time Super Bowl champion

==== Track ====
- Tommy Asinga – Surinamese three-time Olympic track star
- Clement Chukwu – Nigerian Olympic track star
- Hasely Crawford – 1976 men's 100m gold medalist in Montreal
- Savatheda Fynes – Bahamian track and field Olympic gold medalist
- Earl Jones – 1984 Los Angeles Olympics 800 meters bronze medalist
- Hayes Jones – Tokyo Olympics 110-meter hurdles gold medalist
- Brittni Mason – multiple Paralympic medalist
- Paul McMullen – 1996 Olympics track star
- Jamie Nieto – 2004 Olympics track star

==== Other sports ====
- Zach Gowen – professional wrestler
- Dean Rockwell – Olympic team wrestling coach, 1964; World War II Normandy D-Day invasion hero
- Shirley Spork – co-founder of the LPGA
- Franki Strefling (Izzi Dame) – professional wrestler

=== Crime ===
- John Norman Collins – Michigan serial killer
- Daniel Holtzclaw – Oklahoma serial rapist

== Notable faculty ==
- Agnes Dobronski – educator and legislator
- Loren D. Estleman – author
- Michael Harris – scholar and leader
- Anthony Iannaccone – conductor, composer and professor of music
- John W Mills – British sculptor (visiting professor 1970–1971)
- Elmer Mitchell – "father of intramural sports"
- Tracie Morris – poet and literature professor
- Sandra Murchinson – director of the School of Art and Design
- Heather Neff – poet, author and literature professor
- Bessie Leach Priddy – educator, social reformer and leader of the Delta Delta Delta women's fraternity
- Barry Pyle – political scientist and professor
- Edward Sidlow – scholar of United States Congress
- Fatos Tarifa – Albanian diplomat
- John Texter – engineer
- Thomas Tyra – director of bands, composer and professor of music
- Ron Westrum – sociologist
- Stewart Tubbs – communication scholar

== Administration ==
=== Presidents ===
A total of 23 people have served as the president, 22 men and 1 woman. This includes previous presidents under the school's past names, Eastern Michigan College, Michigan State Normal College, and Michigan State Normal School.
