= Wachuku =

Wachuku may refer to:

- Josaiah Ndubuisi Wachuku, Nigerian royalty
- Jaja Wachuku (1918–1996), Nigerian governmental official
- Chuku Wachuku (born 1947), US-educated Nigerian economist
- Nwabueze Jaja Wachuku (born 1954), Nigerian-born United Kingdom-based lawyer
