= Geo storm =

Geo storm may refer to:

- Geo Storm, an automobile
- Geostorm, a 2017 American disaster film
- GunForce II, a 1994 Irem arcade game called Geo Storm in Japan

== See also ==
- Geomagnetic storm
- Geo (disambiguation)
- Magnetic storm (disambiguation)
- Storm (disambiguation)
- StormGeo, a weather forecasting company
