= Geo Television =

Geo Television may refer to:

- Geo Television (Germany), a German television documentary channel established in May 2014, owned by the RTL Group
- Geo TV, a Pakistani television network established in May 2002, owned by the Jang Media Group
  - Geo Entertainment, an entertainment television channel established in October 2002
  - Geo Kahani, another entertainment television channel
  - Geo News, a television news channel established in October 2002
  - Geo Super, a sports television channel
  - Geo Tez, another television news channel
- Jio TV, an Indian television streaming television service established in 2016, owned by Reliance Jio

== See also ==
- Geo (disambiguation)
- JIO (disambiguation)
