= Nwabueze Nwokolo =

Nigerian-born United Kingdom lawyer

Princess Nwabueze Nwokolo
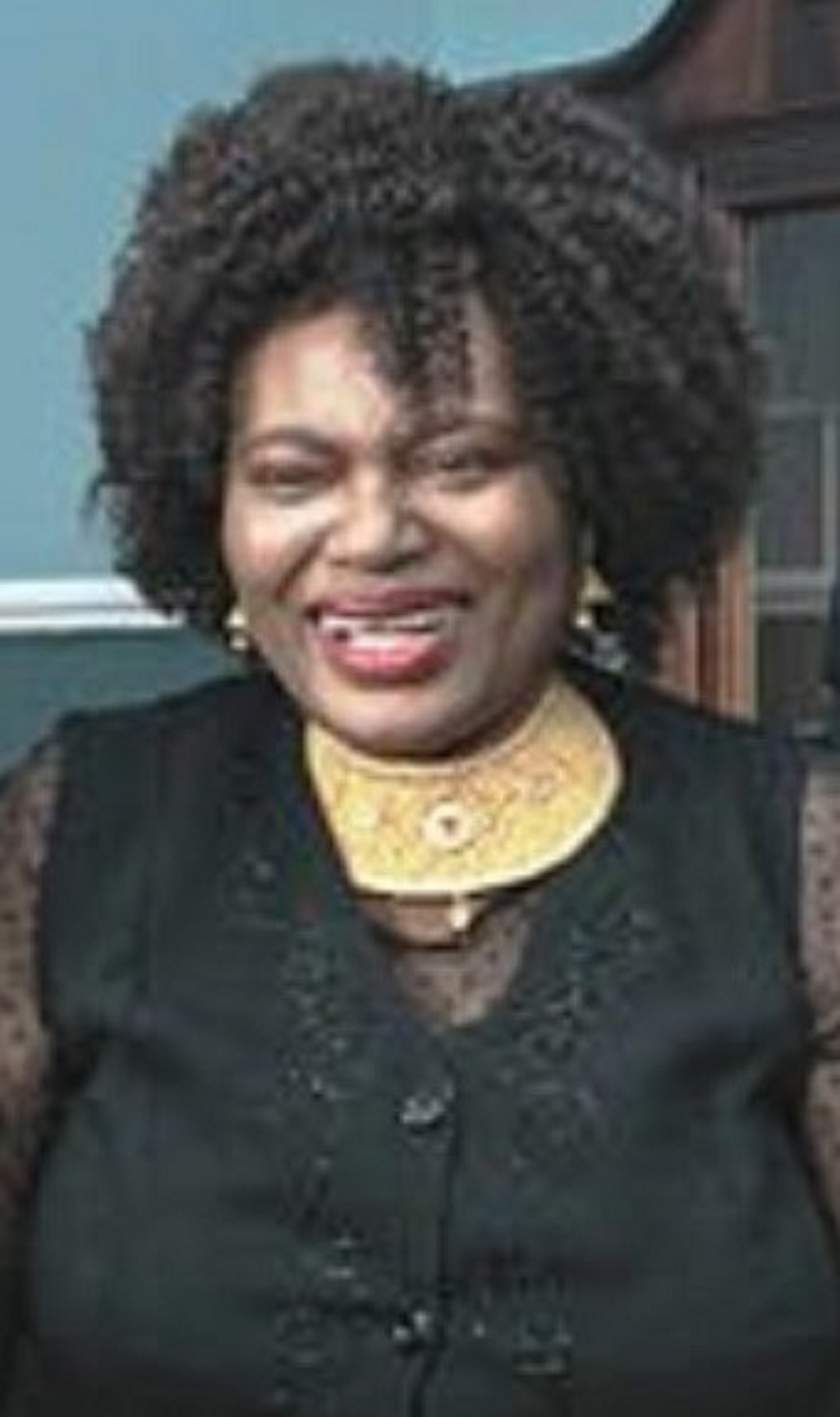
- Nwabueze Jaja Wachuku
- Born: 11 December 1954 (age 71); Abia State: Nigeria
- Education: Legal Studies: Law, Civil and Criminal Procedure, Mediation, etc.
- Alma mater: University of Nigeria, Nsukka, Nottingham Trent University, University of Law: United Kingdom
- Occupations: Council Member: Law Society of England and Wales, Chair: BSN: Black Solicitors Network: The Midlands: UK, Solicitor at Her Majesty's Courts of Justice of England and Wales: Supreme Court of the United Kingdom plus Barrister and Soilicitor: SCN: Supreme Court of Nigeria
- Title: Princess of Ngwa-Land
- Spouse(s): Professor Chuka Nwokolo: MD, FRCP, FRCPE, FEBGH, CBE
- Children: Munachiso Nwokolo, Idu Nwokolo
- Parent: Mother: Rhoda Wachuku. Father: Jaja Wachuku

Nwabueze Jaja Wachuku Nwokolo (born 11 December 1954), a royal princess of Ngwaland, is a Nigerian United Kingdom based lawyer who is council member at Law Society of England and Wales; including being a director and board chair of Great Britain's BSN: Black Solicitors Network, the largest membership organisation of its kind in Europe. Nwokolo is a member of the Law Society of England and Wales' Minority Ethnic Concerns Group. Also, she sits on the RAB: Regulatory Affairs Board of the Law Society.

Nwokolo is a humanitarian, multiculturalism and better family plus social justice advocate; as well as a mediation, philanthropy, nonprofit, servant leadership, community development, peacebuilding, equality, tolerance, inclusion and diversity expert. In November 2011, Nwokolo contributed to the Judicial Appointments Process in the House of Lords of the United Kingdom of Great Britain and Northern Ireland.

Nwokolo is the daughter of Jaja Wachuku: Nigeria's first Speaker of the House of Representatives; as well as first Nigerian Ambassador and Permanent Representative to the United Nations; and first Nigerian Minister for Foreign Affairs and Commonwealth Relations. She is a granddaughter of King Josaiah Ndubuisi Wachuku. In May 2013, Nwokolo was listed as a role model in Great Britain by BRM-UK: Black Role Models United Kingdom organisation headquartered in London.

== Early life and education ==
Born as Nwambeze or Nwabueze Jaja Wachuku in Nigeria during 1954 to Rhoda and Jaja Wachuku, Nwokolo attended Queen's School Enugu and the University of Nigeria, Nsukka (UNN) from 1973 to 1977 where she graduated with LLB: Bachelor of Laws; including law, civil and criminal procedure, etc. She was called to the Nigerian Bar as BL: Barrister at Law in 1978; and did her National Youth Service Corps programme from 1978 to 1979. At University of Nigeria, Nsukka, she was hall chair, as well as member of the badminton and swimming teams; including being a member of Kandel Klub-show the light.

In 1990, Nwokolo studied further by passing Nottingham Trent University's CPE: Common Professional Examination for law discipline practitioners in the United Kingdom. Also, she advanced higher in her legal studies by commendably graduating from College of Law Chester with LSF: The Law Society Finals in 1991. In 1999, she did PDT Family Mediation Training in the UK. In 2000, Nwokolo qualified for CeMAP: Certificate in Mortgage Advice and Practice; and in 2004, she got a Diploma in Mortgage Lending. Since 1978, Nwokolo has been a Barrister and Solicitor of SCN: Supreme Court of Nigeria; and from 1995, a Solicitor at Her Majesty's Courts of Justice of England and Wales or the Supreme Court of England and Wales- now called Supreme Court of the United Kingdom.

== Career ==
Having graduated and qualified in 1977 as a lawyer from the University of Nigeria, Nsukka, Nwokolo was called to NBA: Nigerian Bar in 1978. Later, in 1995, she enrolled as a solicitor in England and Wales. A council member of The Law Society with responsibility for Minority Ethnic Concerns, Nwokolo is presently chair of the Black Solicitors Network: BSN organisation in the United Kingdom of Great Britain. Accordingly, she represents BSN on the External Implementation Group (EIG) set up by the Solicitors Regulation Authority: SRA – in response to findings of adverse and disproportionate regulation of black and ethnic minority solicitors. As BSN chair, Nwokolo especially contributed to the Judicial Appointments Process in the House of Lords' Constitution Committee in November 2011.

=== Black Solicitors Network ===
Since 2005, she has been a director of BSN: Black Solicitors Network. Earlier, before her election in October 2010 as BSN national chair, she led the Midlands chapter; and had responsibility for pastoral care based upon her longstanding experience as family lawyer, ecumenical trustee and empathic mediator.

"As Black Solicitors Network chair, Nwokolo has been working smart to make sure that the general UK disappointment at the low rate in the number of lawyers of Black and African descent in the legal profession is improved for good in the interest of the country; in terms of better minority inclusion and worthy diversity".

Through many initiatives, which includes the Diversity League Table consultation, Nwokolo has led BSN to work consistently in the direction of widening meaningful participation and access to legal services in the United Kingdom. She is noted for progressive vision in the following words: "Working with our partners we're trying to move things forward in terms of creating a legal workforce drawn from the most meritorious. The inclusion of questions about the social background of lawyers, and lawyers to be, represents an important new phase of the consultation." This crucial Diversity League Table reporting has four main diversity areas; namely: gender, ethnicity, sexual orientation and disabilities. Focusing on the demographic composition of law firms and chambers, results are shown as a sequence of organisation profiles and successive leagues tables; ranking participants in major areas, and also showing an overall ranking on the complete Diversity League Table.

All her professional life, Nwokolo has advocated and campaigned for the elimination of any form of discrimination and unfair treatment of people in the United Kingdom, Nigeria and across countries of the world; and she affirms that "there is much work to be done" by all humankind in the years ahead. Nwokolo said: "We must lead the charge, and not follow in the wake of others who are not as well equipped as solicitors to provide and deliver legal services" for improved human rights, political freedom and survival of black and minority ethnic (BME) practices in the United Kingdom and globally.

In support of Nigerian lawyers, Nwokolo has been a strong advocate for better practices in the African country; and, also, for Nigerian-born lawyers in the United Kingdom, urging the SRA: Solicitors Regulation Authority to be humanely constructive and unbiased in terms of engaging BMES: Black and Minority Ethnic Solicitors in progressive programmes and activities. Also, over the years, Nwokolo has been a willing supporter of SRA through her service of helping specialist groups understand complexities and issues facing them on equality and diversity matters.

=== House of Lords ===
Representing women, disadvantaged people and ethnic minorities, in November 2011, at the House of Lords Constitution Committee, in her service as Black Solicitors Network Chair, Nwokolo favoured the renowned "plateau of merit" reality, concerning the process of appointing Judges in the United Kingdom. She affirmed: ""We don't want a judiciary that is not meritorious ... [but] you may be leaving out a lot of people who would benefit society as a whole." With the plateau of merit "you look at society as a whole and accept merit exists in many different places and identify merit where you wouldn't normally look."

At the House of Lords, Nwokolo is an acclaimed champion of: human welfare, valuable servant leadership vision, enduring tolerance, Intercultural communication, learning to live together , empathic knowledge transfer and making sure that appropriate training is given to those involved in the judicial appointments procedure. She is known to have stated that: "There is a need to expand the thinking around judicial appointments, including giving equality and diversity training to the people who make recommendations for appointments."

=== Law Society Council ===
In 2009, Nwokolo began her second term on the Council of the Law Society of England and Wales, and chaired the Law Society Group Equality and Diversity Committee for three years. Consequently, she continues as a member of the Legal Affairs and Policy Board (LAPB) and Black and Minority Ethnic Forum (BMEF) of the Law Society. In April 2011, she co-chaired the Minority Lawyers' Conference hosted by the Law Society.

Over the years, Nwokolo has been intimately involved in the visionary development and strategic growth of The Law Society's ethnic minorities division; and sees her efforts and service as "a work in progress."

Nwokolo has been a member of the following committees of The Law Society: National Executive: the Young Solicitors Group: 1999–2003, Council Committee: 2002–2005, Equality and Diversity: 2005–2007, Chair Equality and Diversity Committee: 2007–2010, Minority Ethnic Concerns Council: 2005 to date, Legal Affairs and Policy Board: 2007 to date and co-chair of the Minority Lawyers Conference: 2011. Also, she serves as a Member of the following relevant United Kingdom professional groups: Resolution: Solicitors Family Law Association: 1993 to date, SRA: Solicitors Regulation Authority External Implementation Group: 2007 to date, Association of Women Solicitors: 1995 to date and Lawyers with Disability: 2005 to date.

=== Legal education advocacy ===
"Concerning the affordability of legal education in the United Kingdom, Nwokolo has, also, been an unwavering advocate of smartly finding reasonable ways of bringing university education costs down to remove financial hindrance to aspiring black lawyers. She is a clear voice on the need for mentorship programmes and strategies of encouragement for young people interested in studying law".

Affirmatively advocating for an excellent, innovative and exemplary legal education system in the United Kingdom as Law Society Council Member for Minority Ethnic Concerns and Chair of the Law Society Group Equality and Diversity Committee, Nwokolo, said in 2009:

"The solicitors' profession continues to attract BME student lawyers despite the high cost of the academic, conversion and practice aspects of training to be a solicitor. It was easier in the past when grants were available from one's local authority even for the post university stage. The law is an extremely competitive profession as was emphasised by all our panellists. To succeed, you do not necessarily need a first from Oxbridge. What is required is a belief in yourself, passion, integrity, honesty, persistence and a capacity for hard work. You do need as many mentors as you can muster and all our panellists made themselves available to aspiring lawyers in need of help in this regard. A degree in law continues to be highly sought after and valued by employers. Young lawyers should therefore be ready to be innovative and creative in the use of their valuable training as legal professionals."

== Personal life ==
She is married to Chuka Uchemefuna Nwokolo, a medical doctor and professor of gastroenterology and nutrition at University of Warwick; plus CBE: Commander of the Most Excellent Order of the British Empire, they have two daughters: Munachiso and Idu. Solihull, United Kingdom is their home. Also, privately, Nwokolo does representative and racial justice work for the Methodist Church of Great Britain. She is a director, trustee and governor at Queen's Foundation: Edgbaston: Birmingham: England – an ecumenical training college.

AIMs: All Issues Mediation Service, which deals with conflict and dispute resolution in families and communities was founded by her. Notably, Nwokolo does numerous voluntary and nonprofit service to humankind through RIOJAWACH: Rhoda Idu Onumonu Jaja Wachuku, an NGO: Non-governmental organisation she set up in abiding memory of her parents Rhoda and Jaja Wachuku.

== See also ==
- Josaiah Ndubuisi Wachuku
- Jaja Wachuku
- House of Lords
- The Law Society
- Law of the United Kingdom
- Law of Nigeria
- Chuku Wachuku
