= Sidlow (surname) =

Sidlow can be a surname and occasional given name. Notable people with the name include:

- Adam Sidlow (born 1987), English rugby league player
- Cyril Sidlow (1915–2005), Welsh footballer
- Edward Sidlow (born 1952), American professor
- J. Sidlow Baxter (1903–1999), Australian-born pastor and theologian in England
