= Hammink =

Hammink is a surname. Notable people with the surname include:

- Geert Hammink (born 1969), Dutch basketball player and coach
- John Hammink (born 1970), American engineer, musician, artist, and linguist
- Shane Hammink (born 1994), Dutch basketball player, son of Geert
