= Albania–Nigeria relations =

- Nigeria: Albania

Diplomatic mission
- Albanian embassy Egypt: Nigerian embassy Rome

Albania and Nigeria established diplomatic relations in the 1990s when Albania began normalizing ties with African nations when she was seeking economic recovery and Western integration. Both countries are members of the United Nations (UN). Nevertheless, there is currently no Albanian embassy in Lagos or Abuja Nigeria and Nigeria as well does not have an embassy in Tirana, Albania. Instead, Albania has an embassy close to Nigeria, in Egypt and Greece, while Nigeria has an embassy close to Albania, in Rome.

Notwithstanding, the relationship between the two countries is cordial but low-volume, characterized by minimal direct trade, occasional cultural and security alignments, and shared interests in global development. No major conflicts or tensions exist between them, and interactions emphasize mutual support in multilateral settings.

== History ==
Albania's outreach after her colonization and Nigeria's expanding global diplomacy after her independence gave rise to their diplomatic relations. Albania was originally isolated under Enver Hoxha's regime until 1991, when she began normalizing ties with African nations seeking for economic recovery and Western integration. Nigeria, independent since 1960, pursued a pan-African and non-aligned foreign policy under leaders like Jaja Wachuku, fostering relations with newly decolonized countries.

== Economic and trade relations ==
Albania and Nigeria are in cordial trade relations. While Albania exports leather footwears, Non-Knit women's Suits, small machinery parts and Non-Knit Men's Shirts to Nigeria, Nigeria on the other hand exports petroleum and agricultural goods like spices, locust beans, seaweeds, sugar beet, sugarcane and flavored water to Albania.
