= Barry Pyle =

American legal scholar (born 1965)

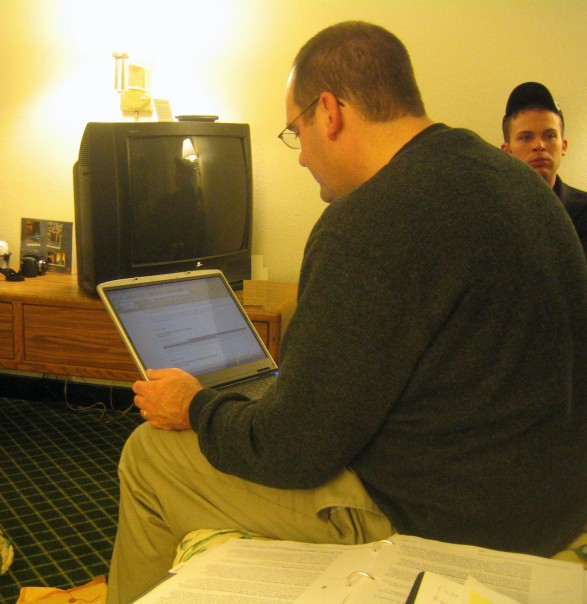
Barry Pyle reading

Barry Pyle (born June 17, 1965) is an associate professor at Eastern Michigan University in the United States who has written on the American judicial system. Along with Elaine Martin he has written "Gender and Racial Diversification of State Supreme Courts". This article was noted by Political Science Quarterly as "one of the best and most comprehensive works on ... the jurisprudence and gender stratification pervasive in the United States legal system."

Pyle attained his undergraduate education at Indiana University Bloomington receiving his degree in political science. He then received his Masters and Ph.D. from University of Missouri–St. Louis.
