= Chuku Wachuku =

Nigerian economist and politician

Prince Chuku Wachuku KSC, Uri Chindere of Nigeria
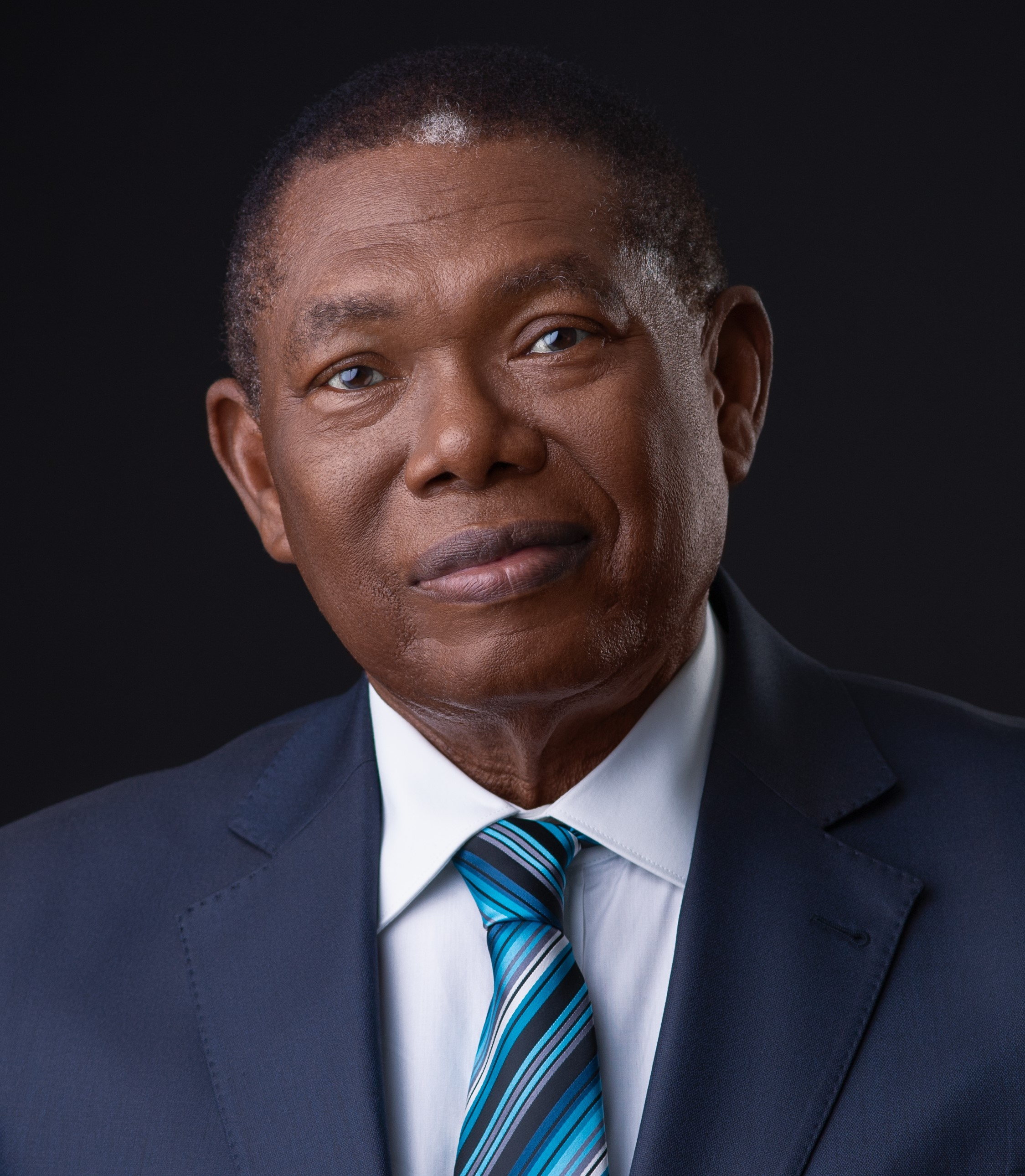
- Chukumere Wachuku
- Born: 13 August 1947 (age 79); Abia State, Nigeria
- Education: Economics and Management Studies
- Alma mater: Eastern Michigan University, Ypsilanti, Michigan
- Occupations: President + CEO: AIEN: Agriculture and Industrial Entrepreneurs of Nigeria
- Title: Chief
- Spouse: Ngozi Wachuku: née: Abengowe. Previously: Gayle Elaine Mcmillian
- Children: From Gayle: Chuku Wachuku, Jr. and Tuwuoanidiari Elaine Onyinyechi Wachuku. From Ngozi: Onyema Wachuku, Anaba Wachuku, Ikechukwu Wachuku, Kelechi Wachuku
- Parent: Mother: Lilly Wachuku. Father: Benjamin Wachuku

Chuku Wachuku // (born Chukumere "Anaba Ndubuisi" Wachuku, 1947), a royal prince of Ngwaland, is a United States educated Nigerian economist, politician, statesman, servant leader, business analyst, management expert and specialist on entrepreneurship development and SMEs: Small and Medium Enterprises. He is first director-general of Ngwa origin at Federal Government of Nigeria major parastatal; NDE: National Directorate of Employment.

Accordingly, Wachuku is president and chief executive officer of AIEN: Agriculture and Industrial Entrepreneurs of Nigeria. Wachuku was national president of NASSI: Nigerian Association of Small Scale Industrialists. He is chairman of research planning: Nigeria-China Business Council; including being an employee welfare and industrial relations consultant for ILO: International Labour Organization, a specialised agency of the United Nations in Geneva, Switzerland. By presidential appointment, he serves on the board of Nigeria's RMRDC: Raw Materials Research and Development Council.

In February 2014, President Goodluck Jonathan approved the selection of Wachuku by Abia State Government as a delegate representing south-east geo-political zone and Abia State at the Nigerian National Conference. Earlier, in July 2013, President Jonathan appointed Wachuku to serve on the governing board of NASENI: National Agency for Science and Engineering Infrastructure; as well as the governing board of SMEDAN: Small and Medium Enterprises Development Agency of Nigeria. Previously, Wachuku served as director-general of NDE: National Directorate of Employment.

Wachuku is a nephew of Jaja Wachuku, Nigeria's first speaker of the House of Representatives as well as first Nigerian ambassador and permanent representative to the United Nations; and first Nigerian minister for foreign affairs and commonwealth relations. He is a grandson of King Josaiah Ndubuisi Wachuku, who was paramount chief (Onye Isi), servant leader and Eze of Ngwa-land - in the then Aba Division of Eastern Nigeria: Africa: Commonwealth: Earth.

== Career movement ==
Over these years, since 1982, Wachuku has served humankind as follows: consultant economist and specialist on entrepreneurship development, agricultural entrepreneur, consultant on small-scale industrial advancement and strategy; commissioner for special duties and special adviser on economic affairs to the governor of old Imo State, Nigeria; chief executive officer, Development Finance and Investment Company, old Imo State; director of operations: NDE: National Directorate of Employment; and later, appointed director-general: NDE: National Directorate of Employment of the Federal Republic of Nigeria by then head of state, President Ibrahim Babangida. In 2007, he was Labour Party governorship candidate for Abia State.

He is president and chief executive officer of AIEN: Agriculture and Industrial Entrepreneurs of Nigeria. Also, Wachuku is president and chief executive officer at ICED: International Center for Entrepreneurship Development in Nigeria; as well as consultant economist on entrepreneurship development, small and medium scale enterprises in the informal sector for the Federal Government of Nigeria. He serves as an advisor and consultant on the US$6.2 million or ₦1 billion Naira Central Bank of Nigeria – Abia State Agricultural Empowerment Scheme.

Wachuku is executive chairman of Zara Limited, a Nigerian company involved in real estate development and construction, president and chief executive officer of Zara Homes Incorporated in Maryland, United States of America. He served as national president of NASSI: Nigerian Association of Small Scale Industrialists; including serving Nigeria's Abia State University in the following positions: Ranking Member, Governing Council; chairman, Finance and Budget Committee; chairman, Technical Committee of Tenders Board; chairman, Investments Committee; chairman, Founders Day Committee; Member, Development and Investment Limited; chairman: Investments and Finance Committee; chairman, Planning and Strategy; and chairman, Budget Committee.

In recognition of Wachuku's commitment and progressive service to Nigerians, President Goodluck Jonathan appointed him to be a constructive part of the following federal boards: RMRDC: Raw Materials Research and Development Council; SMEDAN: Small and Medium Enterprises Development Agency; NASENI: National Agency for Science and Engineering Infrastructure; and delegate to the 2014 Nigerian National Conference, representing South Eastern States – by recommendation and support of Abia State government.

== Senatorial election 2023 ==
To serve his people, on 21 March 2022, Wachuku declared his intention to run for Senate of Nigeria from Abia Central Senatorial District in 2023 election as a member of PDP: Peoples Democratic Party (Nigeria). On 1 June 2022, before primaries of PDP, Wachuku withdrew from the party's senatorial candidate contest "citing lack of transparency, non-compliance with due process, manipulations and non conduct of the three-man delegate congress in his district as reasons for his action."

On 3 June 2022, Wachuku was elected YPP: Young Progressives Party senatorial candidate for Abia Central ahead of 2023 General Election in Nigeria. On 25 February 2023, Wachuku lost Abia Central senatorial election to Darlington Nwokocha of Labour Party (Nigeria).

== AIEN executive presidency ==
Wachuku serves as president and chief executive officer of AIEN: Agriculture and Industrial Entrepreneurs of Nigeria. This association upholds Nigeria and African Union's Agenda 2063: The Africa We Want; adopted on 31 January 2015 at the 24th Ordinary Assembly of Heads of State and Governments of African Union in Addis Ababa, Ethiopia; especially Agenda 2063's Flagship Project 2 concerning: "formulation of a strategy for transforming the African economy from a supplier of raw materials to one that actively uses its own resources."

Also, Wachuku's AIEN: Agriculture and Industrial Entrepreneurs of Nigeria uplifts and adheres to all Global Goals: Agenda 2030, SDGs: Sustainable Development Goals of United Nations; basically SDG 2 on Zero Hunger: "End hunger, achieve food security and improved nutrition, and promote sustainable agriculture;" an agenda comprising 17 global goals created to be a "blueprint to achieve a better and more sustainable future for all" humankind and our planet; started in 2015 by United Nations General Assembly as a component of United Nations Resolution 70/1; and targeted to be achieved by 2030.

In 2018, Wachuku led AIEN: Agriculture and Industrial Entrepreneurs of Nigeria launched an initiative called Agricultural and Industrial Clusters in all 774 Local Government Areas of Nigeria, to create jobs and sustainable agriculture and viable means of livelihoods. With the RMRDC: Raw Materials Research and Development Council, Wachuku's AIEN signed a US$41 million (₦15 billion Naira) MoU: Memorandum of Understanding to fast-track agricultural industrialization, and availability of raw materials to boost sustainable agriculture, soil improvement, crop yield, innovation, agri-business, jobs creation, manufacturing, climate friendly, green, renewable farming methods, nutrition and food security in Nigeria.

== NASSI presidency ==
Wachuku's daily mission in caring servant leadership, during his service as National President of Nigerian Association of Small Scale Industrialists was proactively helping to grow the Nigerian economy. This was aimed towards poverty eradication among the citizens, and also protecting the interests of all marginalized small scale businesses. He made it an unwavering point of presidential calling to make sure that ideals for NASSI's existence were upheld and result oriented.

Established in 1978, NASSI: Nigerian Association of Small Scale Industrialists was meant to cater for the needs of the small scale business industrialist through the provision of social, political and economic support for its members. NASSI organises knowledge transfer workshops, conferences, exhibitions, trade-fairs and study tours, including the provision of advisory services for all relevant groups and individuals in business. Also, the association provides information on required global manufacturing standards, sources of raw materials, market situations, available plants and equipment. NASSI grants micro credit facilities to members and sometimes stands as sureties for verified and trusted SMEs in their relationship with finance institutions. The association connects its members to diverse opportunities within Nigeria and internationally. Serving as a strong advocate for its members against disadvantageous public policies is, also, part of the work of NASSI.

=== Guarantee project ===
In March 2011, Wachuku announced in Lagos, that NASSI was launching a guaranteed project of action for its member firms, saying that the program was aimed at filling gaps for members who lacked collateral to support their credit proposals to banks. He affirmed that NASSI would work out the critical minimum requirement for accessing credit by small industries, emphasising that NASSI was already looking at ways of accessing the US$1.2 billion or ₦200 billion naira SMSEs: Small and Medium Scale Enterprises fund put up by the Central Bank of Nigeria. Wachuku stated: "I want to make sure that government understands that the engine of growth of any economy rests on SMEs. It is my duty to initiate and tell people that the policy direction of NASSI is to make loans available to SMEs. I want to ensure that lack of collateral by our members is addressed such that concessionary interest rate is given to small scale borrowers."

=== NERFUND agreement ===
In December 2011, Wachuku led NASSI to go into favorable agreement with Nigeria's National Economic Reconstruction Fund (NERFUND), to help finance projects for NASSI members. A memorandum of understanding was signed between the managing director of NERFUND, Alhaji Baba Maina Gimba and Wachuku. Under the agreement, NASSI was required to present projects that needed funding to NERFUND, accordingly, NERFUND was to evaluate and disburse helpful funds; as well as insuring all business deals. At the signing ceremony, Wachuku questioned “a country of 167 million people with some 59 million small scale industries, having only three functional Development Finance Institutions (DFIs)", stating that it was clearly inadequate, and calling for more DFIs.

=== Stable power espousal ===
Strategically, Wachuku has always pushed for the realization of stable power supply in Nigeria; maintaining that since the 1999 arrival of democracy in the country, many companies have been operating below capacity because of unstable power supply, insufficient financial resources and alarming labor costs.

He stated that gross inadequate power supply has increased businesses' expenses, reduced productivity and stunted economic growth in Nigeria, forcing the closure of many companies or/and relocation of some others to neighboring countries. Wachuku pointed out that: "blackouts are negatively impacting the economy, which is grappling with a combination of slow growth, a weak currency, high inflation and the effect of flooding that is expected to drive up food prices."

=== Jobs for youths advocacy ===
Making sure that government upholds conducive ways and capacities for the private sector to empower and create jobs for the youth in Nigeria has been one of Wachuku's abiding principles of service.

In a November 2011 lecture titled: Investment Climate: What is the Weather in Nigeria, presented at Ikeja, Lagos based SOFFE: Sam Ohuabunwa Foundation for Economic Empowerment , Wachuku reflected on his vision and mission of creating jobs for Nigerian youths. According to him,

"the private sector should be given more autonomy to direct matters that deal directly with youth empowerment and job creation. In this regard, NASSI will lead a networking initiative that will include value chain-related organisations along with states and local governments. NASSI will, through this partnership, adequately address issues and factors that militate against the growth of SMEIs and work out positive and workable frameworks that will once and for all ensure the growth of SMEIs. Government can not create jobs in a sustainable way. There is need to boost production and ensure that small-scale industries contribute 90 to 95 per cent to GDP. That is why I ask you, can government actually create jobs? To this particular question, my answer is no! And I speak as an expert on this matter. The other sustainable way I know is to create a powerful private sector-driven entrepreneurial base, propelled and predicated on small and medium scale industries and the informal sector."

Again, in a June 2012 interview by Nigeria's Vanguard Daily Newspaper, Wachuku stressed the crucial need for jobs and youth empowerment, in the following words: "Nigeria needs to create not less than five million jobs yearly to meet employment needs of her growing population."

=== SMEs and banks ===
With objective consistency, Wachuku has usually let the world know that Nigerian banks pay "lip service" towards effectively funding SMEs: Small and Medium Enterprises in the so-called "giant" African country. He maintains that, in any nation, banks should be helpful partners in sustainable economic development to the viable benefit of emerging businesses and general population. In a February 2014 interview he granted The Punch, Wachuku stated:

"We want to add value through skills acquisition. But in doing this, we have found out that the main problem is getting finance at affordable interest rates. The Federal Government talks about this and banks also talk about it. But I want to state here that Nigerian banks have not been helpful. They always say money is available. Where is the money? There is no small scale industrialist who walks into a bank and gets a loan. It is difficult for SMEs to get loans from banks because they always demand for collaterals. The collateral they ask for is over and above the worth of the loan. So, banks are not keen on lending to small scale businesses at all. They say this sub-sector is risk infested. They may claim that they have given some amount of money as loans to SMEs; but you will find out that this is not true. For instance, what can a loan that is given to 2,000 people in a nation of about 167 million people do? The last statistics conducted by the National Bureau of Statistics showed that there were about 17 million small scale industrialists in Nigeria and you are talking about empowering 2,000 people with loans. What is that? So, Nigerian banks are paying lip service to funding SMEs."

=== CBN Governor ===
As a respected financial expert and constructive economist, Wachuku was, in February 2014, called on by the media to comment on President Goodluck Jonathan's suspension of Central Bank of Nigeria's governor, Sanusi Lamido Sanusi. He shared his economic and political view as follows:

"Sanusi should not have been publicly singing a different tune from that of the President. As a senior government official who has done an outstanding job in the country’s banking sector, what he should have done was talk to his principal and advise him in private. It was wrong for him to rush to the media to sing divergent tunes. No president anywhere in the world will allow that. However, Sanusi's suspension is likely to create micro-economic distortions and cause some shivers in the economy."

=== First Bank MoU ===
In October 2012, Wachuku concluded Memorandum of Understanding arrangements for a new SMEs funding program between Nigerian Association of Small Scale Industrialists and First Bank of Nigeria. Concerning the new program, Wachuku explained: "lack of access to loan-able funds at cheap and profitable interest rates had been the bane of Small and Medium Scale Enterprises in the country. I commend First bank of Nigeria for their trail-blazing action. Before we got to First Bank, we had approached a number of banks, but their concern was primarily and solely the profit motif. It is, therefore, a major achievement that First Bank, as the leading bank, truly, agreed to our proposal. This gesture from First Bank is one laced with patriotic zeal, as it had the potential to revolutionize operations of small scale industrialists, and by extension the economy of Nigeria as a whole. The current Group Managing Director of the bank, Mr. Bisi Onasanya, gave unqualified support to the project. Onasanya saw it as a key corporate social responsibility activity with multiplier effects on the economy.The government itself agreed that the private sector contributes about 90 per cent to the nation's Gross Domestic Product. With SMEs forming about 65 per cent of private sector operations, one can only imagine what effects this new move by the First Bank will be on the economy." Continuing, he said "banks in the country, for a long time, had been part of the problem of the real sector, saying they would rather get involved in round-tripping and short-term lending for commercial activities, than to lend to businesses with manufacturing operations. It is in this light that the new twist is commendable of emulation by other banks. First Bank, through its current General Managing Director, has shown an unusual disposition to the plight of small scale industrialists. I think Mr. Onasanya deserves all kudos."

== Family of Chuku ==
Late High Chief, Mrs. Lilly Wachuku, was the mother of Chukumere Anaba Ndubuisi Wachuku, and his siblings: Obimndi Wachuku, Nne Wachuku, Mrs. Nne Stanley Onyemerekeya, Okey Wachuku and Anaba Wachuku. High Chief Benjamin Anaba Ndubuisi Wachuku, the son of King Josaiah Ndubuisi Wachuku, was the father of Chukumere Anaba Ndubuisi Wachuku and his siblings.

Wachuku is married to former Miss Ngozi Abengowe, now Mrs. Ngozi Wachuku, and they have four children, all boys namely: Onyema Wachuku, Anaba Wachuku, Ikechukwu Wachuku and Kelechi Wachuku. From 2019 to 2021, Chuku Wachuku's second son, Onyema, was commissioner for small and medium enterprises development in Abia State Nigeria, and at 35 years of age, as of 2019, was the youngest Commissioner in Abia State, Nigeria.

Wachuku was previously married to Gayle Elaine Mcmillian. The marriage produced two children: his first son, Chukumere Wachuku, Jr., and his only daughter, Tuwuoanidiari Elaine Onyinyechi Wachuku.

== See also ==
- Economy of Nigeria
- Josaiah Ndubuisi Wachuku
- Jaja Wachuku
- Nwabueze Jaja Wachuku
