= J10 =

J10 may refer to:

== Vehicles ==
=== Aircraft ===
- Chengdu J-10, a Chinese fighter aircraft
- Junkers J 10, a German ground attack aircraft

=== Automobiles ===
- Jeep J10, an American pickup truck
- Karsan J10, a Turkish minibus
- Subaru J10, a Japanese hatchback

=== Locomotives ===
- LNER Class J10, a class of British steam locomotives

== Other uses ==
- Gyroelongated square pyramid (J_{10}), a Johnson solid
- Malaysia Federal Route J10
- Sony Ericsson J10, a mobile phone

== See also ==
- JIO (disambiguation)
