= Magnetic storm (disambiguation) =

A magnetic storm is a temporary disturbance of the Earth's magnetosphere caused by a solar wind shock wave.

Magnetic storm can also refer to:

- Magnetic Storm, a 1984 book by Roger Dean
- "Magnetic Storm", an episode of Nova documentary TV series, 2003

== See also ==
- Solar storm
