= Philip Southern =

Philip David Southern
- Born: November 5, 1986 (age 39); Pennsylvania, United States
- Known for: Photography
- Notable work: "Lee Plaza"
- Awards: YOBI Pics Photographer of the Year

Philip Southern is a freelance prize-winning photographer from Warren, Michigan.

== History ==
Southern has worked as a freelance photographer for Michigan newspapers in. He has also shot products for companies such as General Motors in Detroit and done photojournalism in Thailand and Brazil. He graduated in April from Eastern Michigan University with a degree in Business. He recently moved to Los Angeles and is currently doing set photography for "It's Me Again" featuring Della Reese.

== YOBI.tv ==
In 2009, while still a senior at Eastern Michigan University, Southern won the YOBI Pics contest from YOBI.tv's first season for his entry "Lee Plaza." He won $10,000.00 and tickets for two to a grand opening of a major collection showing at the Annenberg Space for Photography in Los Angeles and VIP access to the lecture series and workshops at the museum.

== Winning Entry ==
"Lee Plaza" is a photo depicting a broken piano inside of a broken down building in Detroit. In describing the prize-winning photo, Southern indicated that he loves, "thinking about the history of the place. Who used to come there and what their lives were like."
