= Josef Norris =

American artist (born 1965)

Anthony Josef Norris
- Born: April 14, 1965 (age 61); Mount Dora, FL
- Occupation: Artist

Josef Norris (full name Anthony Josef Norris, born April 14, 1965) is an American artist who has made public murals and mosaic portraits.

== Work ==
Norris has created more than 100 murals throughout the United States. He has been commissioned to create murals for Starbucks Coffee Company, the Philadelphia Mural Arts Program, San Francisco Neighborhood Beautification Fund, the City of Oakland, MUNI, and the San Francisco Department of Recreation and Parks.

He was commissioned in 1998 by Starbucks to create a mural at a San Francisco location, and by the Neighborhood Beautification Fund to paint a mural on top of Harvey Milk's camera shop. In 2004 he was commissioned by the Philadelphia Mural Arts Program to create "Camilla's Dream". In 2003 he created the "Performing Arts Mural" located at the Performing Arts Garage at Gough and Fulton Streets. Others, including the 2008 "Jalisa", are located in neighborhoods throughout the San Francisco Bay Area.

Norris was the founder and director of Kid Serve, a non-profit organization that worked with youth to create public art in their communities. In 2008 Kid Serve won an award from San Francisco Beautiful for the mosaic murals created with high school students along Geary Boulevard, including the mural A Sign of Hope. Kid Serve did more than 80 youth mural projects with Bay Area kids from 1999 to 2011, including the Fell Street Mural Project in 2009 with students from San Francisco's Ida B. Wells High School.

== Arrest and sentencing ==
On June 2, 2011 Norris was arrested by US FBI agents for possessing child pornography; over 600 pornographic images of children were found on his home computer, according to an arrest warrant affidavit filed in federal court in San Francisco. Norris' personal web site and Kid Serve site were subsequently deactivated. Norris pleaded guilty to the charges, and in March 2012 he was sentenced to six years in prison.
