= Ann Purmell =

American children's book author (born 1953)

- Born: November 15, 1953 (age 73); Ann Arbor, Michigan, U.S.
- Education: Eastern Michigan University
- Occupation: Author
- Children: 2
- Writing career
- Genre: Children's literature

Ann Purmell (born November 15, 1953, in Ann Arbor, Michigan) is an American children's book author.

Purmell published her first book, Apple Cider Making Days, in 2002, followed by Where Wild Babies Sleep in 2003. Her next book, Christmas Tree Farm (2006), won the 2007 Ohio Farm Bureau Federation's Children's Literature Award. The award goes to children's books with an agricultural subject. Her 2008 book, Maple Syrup Season, continued with her agricultural themes.

Purmell was a psychiatric nurse for children, having received her nursing degree from Eastern Michigan University in 1979. Purmell is married to a dentist and has two children.

== Publications ==
- Purmell, Ann (2002). Apple Cider Making Days. Illustrated by Joanne Friar. Millbrook. ISBN 0-7613-2364-3.
- Purmell, Ann (2003). Where Wild Babies Sleep. Illustrated by Lorianne Siomades. Boyds Mills. ISBN 0-7613-2364-3.
- Purmell, Ann (2006). Christmas Tree Farm. Illustrated by Jill Weber. Holiday House. ISBN 0-8234-1886-3.
- Purmell, Ann (2008). Maple Syrup Season. Illustrated by Jill Weber. Holiday House. ISBN 978-0-8234-1891-6.
