= Geo =

Geo- is a prefix derived from the Greek word γη or γαια, meaning "earth", usually in the sense of "ground or land”.

GEO or Geo may also refer to:

== Arts, entertainment, and media ==
- GEO (magazine), a popular scientific magazine
- Geo (Ninjago), character from Ninjago
- Geo Stelar, the protagonist in Mega Man Star Force
- GEO Television (disambiguation)

== Brands and enterprises ==
- Geo (automobile), a defunct brand of entry-level cars produced by General Motors
- Georgetown University, abbreviated as Geo. in Bluebook
- GEO Group, a prison corporation

== Computing and science ==
- Geo (microformat), a microformat for marking up geographical coordinates in (X)HTML
- Generative engine optimization, the marketing practice of influencing the results provided by large language models
- Gene Expression Omnibus, or GEO, a National Center for Biotechnology Information database for gene expression
- GEO 600, a detector for gravitational radiation
- Geo URI, an IETF proposed standard for making URIs for physical locations
- Geosynchronous Equatorial Orbit, an orbit used for satellites that remain at a fixed position above the ground

== Groups and organizations ==
- General Education Officer, the basic rank of teachers of the Ministry of Education in Singapore
- Group on Earth Observations, an intergovernmental organization
- Grupo Especial de Operaciones, a special SWAT division of the Spanish police

== People ==
- Geo Bogza, Romanian poet and essayist
- Geo Dumitrescu, Romanian poet
- Geo Rutherford, American artist and TikToker
- George (given name), commonly abbreviated Geo.
- Christian Geo Heltboe, Danish comedian known by his middle name

== Places ==
- Geo (landscape), a creek (inlet) or gulley in the Orkney and Shetland Islands
- GEO, the IOC country code and three letter country code for Georgia (country), in Eurasia
- GEO, the IATA code for Cheddi Jagan International Airport, Timehri, Guyana
- Estadio Casas GEO, stadium in Mexicali, Mexico

== See also ==
- JIO (disambiguation)
