= JIO =

JIO or Jio may refer to:

- Joint Intelligence Organisation (Australia)
- Joint Intelligence Organisation (United Kingdom)
- Jio, a 4G data services company in India, owned by Reliance Industries
- jio, ISO 639 code for the Jiamao language

== See also ==
- Geo (disambiguation)
- J10 (disambiguation)
- Geo Television (disambiguation)
- Jiyo, a smartphone app by Deepak Chopra
