= Jaja Wachuku =

Nigerian lawyer, politician and diplomat (1918–1996)

The Right Honourable Jaja Wachuku Ugo Ngwa, LL.D, CFR

Minister for Foreign Affairs and Commonwealth Relations
- In office 1961–1965
- Prime Minister: Abubakar Tafawa Balewa
- Preceded by: position established
- Succeeded by: Nuhu Bamalli

Permanent Representative of Nigeria to the United Nations
- In office 1960–1961
- Governor-General: Nnamdi Azikiwe
- Prime Minister: Abubakar Tafawa Balewa
- Preceded by: position established
- Succeeded by: Muhammad Ngileruma

Speaker of the House of Representatives of Nigeria
- In office 1959–1960
- Prime Minister: Abubakar Tafawa Balewa
- Preceded by: Sir Frederic Metcalfe
- Succeeded by: Ibrahim Jalo Waziri

Senator Representing Aba Zone Nigeria
- In office 1 October 1979 – 1 October 1983
- Preceded by: position established
- Succeeded by: Position abolished

Personal details
- Born: 1 January 1918 Nbawsi, Southern Region, British Nigeria (now in Abia State, Nigeria)
- Died: 7 November 1996 (aged 78) Enugu, Nigeria
- Party: National Council of Nigeria and the Cameroons; Nigerian People's Party
- Spouse: Rhoda Idu Oona Onumonu
- Education: Trinity College Dublin
- Profession: Lawyer

Jaja Anucha Ndubuisi Wachuku // (1 January 1918 – 7 November 1996) was a Pan-Africanist and a Nigerian statesman, lawyer, politician, diplomat and humanitarian. He was the first Speaker of the Nigerian House of Representatives; as well as the first Nigerian Ambassador and Permanent Representative to the United Nations. Also, Wachuku was the first Nigerian Minister for Foreign Affairs. Notably, Wachuku was a Royal Prince of Ngwaland, "descendant of 20 generations of African chiefs in the Igbo country of Eastern Nigeria".

Wachuku, who was "widely respected" as Foreign Affairs Minister, intervened with the South African government and helped save Nelson Mandela and others from the death penalty at the 1963–64 Rivonia Trial. A year earlier, in his 1962 diary, from Lagos: Nigeria, Nelson Mandela wrote: "Friday 18 May 1962: 1pm: We meet Mr Jaja Wachuku and his staff and have a profitable discussion. Saturday 19 May 1962: We have lunch with Jaja Wachuku."

In 2010, President Goodluck Jonathan conferred on Wachuku a posthumous special Golden Jubilee Independence Anniversary Award; Wachuku was honoured by Jonathan again in 2014 as a Hero of the Struggle for Nigeria's Independence from Great Britain and a Pioneer Political Leader for the 100-year anniversary of Nigeria.

== Biography ==
=== Family ===
Jaja Wachuku

Jaja Anucha Wachuku's father, King Josaiah Ndubuisi Wachuku, was the Eze, Paramount Chief, Servant Leader and Head of all Ngwa of the then Aba Division of Eastern Nigeria. Jaja's mother, Queen Rebecca Ngwanchiwa Wachuku (née Nwaogwugwu), was a pioneer women's rights advocate and humane royal land-owner.

His apical ancestor Mgbawa had moved from Umulolo, Eziama Ntigha, in Nigeria's present-day Abia State, in about the last quarter of the 17th century to settle in their present Nbawsi homeland. His paternal grandfather Wachuku Ogbaraegbe, a distinguished statesman and Merchant Prince, was involved in the palm oil trade of that time with King Jaja of Opobo. It was in memory of the friendship, partnership and association of the Wachuku family with King Jaja of Opobo that he was named Jaja. His second name, Anucha, in full in the Igbo language, is Anucha mba agaa n'ama ha, meaning "after celebrating victory over a people, you parade through their town or village main square."

=== Early education ===
For his primary education, Wachuku attended Infant School at St. Georges NDP Umuomainta, Nbawsi, Abia State. He was school band leader and prefect at Government School Afikpo, Ebonyi State. He left there in 1930, having come first in the whole of Ogoja Province in the First School Leaving Certificate Examination. This first position got him an automatic scholarship for his secondary school education at Government College Umuahia, Abia State, from 1931 to 1936. Wachuku was a House Prefect. He played tennis and cricket, and was in the first eleven of the college's football team: Also, Wachuku acquired vocational skills in carpentry, farming and metal works at Government College Umuahia.

From 1936 to 1937, Wachuku was on scholarship to Yaba Higher College, Lagos. He was withdrawn from Yaba by his father Josaiah Ndubuisi Wachuku and sent to Gold Coast People's College, Adidome. From there, he went to New Africa University College, Anloga, in preparation for further studies abroad. While at New Africa University College, he won a Foundation Scholarship and also won the First National Prize for the Gold Coast (now Ghana) in the World Essay Competition offered by the New History Society of New York (led by Mirza Ahmad Sohrab), on the subject: "How Can the People of the World Achieve Universal Disarmament?" From New Africa University College, Wachuku left for the University of Dublin's Trinity College in Ireland.

=== Dublin years ===
Wachuku was the first African medallist, laureate in Oratory of Trinity College Dublin, Ireland. He matriculated at Trinity College in 1939, and was, in 1941, elected Executive Member of the College Historical Society. Wachuku represented University of Dublin during the 1943 Inter-University Debate held at University of Durham. He was called to the Irish bar association – Kings Inn – in November 1944. He was fully involved in Nigeria's constitutional conferences and struggle for independence from Great Britain. Wachuku practised law in Dublin for three years, before returning to Nigeria in 1947. He graduated first-class BA legal science and was LL.B Prizeman in Roman Law, Constitutional Law and Criminal Law. He was also a research fellow at the Department of International Law, Trinity College Dublin – with the topic: "The Juristic Status of Protectorates in International Law." From 1947 to 1996, Wachuku served as barrister and solicitor of The Supreme Court of Nigeria. He also practised at the West African Court of Appeal.

While in Dublin, Wachuku was an executive member of the Student Christian Movement (SCM). He lectured on various subjects at the SCM Summer Schools in Great Britain and Ireland; and delivered the last seven lectures at Swanwick, Hampshire, on the subject: "Africa in the Post-War World." From 1939 to 1943, Wachuku was secretary of the Association of Students of African Descent (ASAD) in Ireland. 1944 saw him elected president of the ASAD. In 1945, he represented ASAD at the fifth Pan-African Congress held in Manchester, UK; the event was partly organised by Kwame Nkrumah and attended by names such as W. E. B. Du Bois, Jomo Kenyatta and Hastings Banda to name just a few.

From 1943 to 1945, Wachuku was founder, organiser and secretary of the Dublin International Club. He was president of the club from 1945 to 1947 and resigned when he returned to Nigeria in 1947 to fight for an end to colonial rule and independence of Nigeria from Great Britain. In 1947 also, Wachuku was, for six weeks, Legal and Constitutional Adviser to the National Council of Nigeria and the Cameroons (NCNC) Pan-Nigeria Delegation that went to London to press for constitutional reforms in Nigeria. He was awarded LL.D (Honoris Causa) by Trinity College Dublin.

Wachuku [left: capped] as First indigenous Speaker of the Nigerian House of Representatives [during Nigeria's Independence Ceremonies on 1 October 1960] with Prime Minister Balewa and Princess Alexandra of Kent

=== Return to Nigeria and politics ===
Wachuku returned to Nigeria in 1947, travelling in the same ship with Nnamdi Azikiwe; and was present at Takoradi, Gold Coast (present-day Ghana) when Azikiwe spoke to Joseph B. Danquah, leader of the United Gold Coast Convention – concerning the organizational ability of Kwame Nkrumah. Azikiwe then urged Joseph B. Danquah to invite Nkrumah back home from England. In the same year of his return to Nigeria, Wachuku joined the NCNC, and was elected the Party's Legal Adviser and Member of the National Executive Committee. He soon got involved in the nationalist agitation of that period and was a favoured lecturer at the Glover Memorial Hall, Lagos. Among other responsibilities, Wachuku was Principal Secretary of the Igbo State Union from 1948 to 1952. In 1949, he founded a radical youth movement, the New Africa Party, and affiliated it to the NCNC in 1950. NCNC was later called: National Council of Nigerian Citizens. Concerning Wachuku's New Africa Party, in a letter from London, dated 29 May 1951, sent to W. E. B. Du Bois, and later included in The Correspondence of W. E. B. Du Bois, George Padmore said: "Enclosed are a few clippings from West Africa. You will no doubt remember Jaja Wachuku who was a delegate to the Fifth Pan-African Congress. He has recently started a Pan-African Party in Nigeria to spread the ideas of which you are the worthy father...."

Wachuku was co-founder and original shareholder, with Nnamdi Azikiwe, of the African Continental Bank (ACB), and first regional director of the bank, from 1948 to 1952. As ACB Director, he facilitated the opening of branches in Aba, Calabar, Port Harcourt and Enugu. Wachuku started his political career from the grassroots. In 1948, he was first nominated village councillor and later to the Nsulu Group Council. From 1949 to 1952, he was a Member of the Ngwa Native Authority, Okpuala Ngwa. In 1951, he entered regional politics and was elected Second Member for Aba Division in the Eastern Nigeria House of Assembly. From 1952 to 1953, Wachuku was elected Deputy Leader of the NCNC and Chairman of the Parliamentary Party when there was crisis in Nigeria's Eastern Region – resulting in the dissolution of the Eastern House of Assembly. Also, from 1952 to 1953, he was Chairman of the Eastern Regional Scholarship Board and Member of the Finance Committee in the House of Representatives of Nigeria. Wachuku went to the 1953 Constitutional Conference in London as Alternate Delegate and Adviser to the Nigerian Independence Party (NIP) – a break-away faction that was formed following the NCNC crisis of 1953.

In 1954, Wachuku lost the Eastern Regional election and ceased to be a member of the House of Representatives. Later on in 1954, when the principle of direct election to the House of Representatives was introduced, he was re-elected first member for the Aba Division in the House of Representatives; as well as member of United Nigeria Independence Party – amalgamation of NIP and another party. In 1957, Wachuku became Deputy Leader of opposition when he joined the NCNC. From 1957 to 1959, he was a board member of the Electricity Corporation of Nigeria. Also, in 1957, for the following three years, he was appointed member of the Local Education Authority and chairman of the board of Education in the Eastern Region of Nigeria. During the same period, Wachuku was also Chairman of Aba Divisional Committee of the NCNC.

Accordingly, in 1957, Wachuku was the Leader of the Nigerian Federation Delegation to the Commonwealth Parliamentary Association Meeting held in India, Pakistan and Ceylon, now Sri Lanka. He also represented Nigeria in Liberia during the opening of the New Parliament Building in Monrovia. From 1958 to 1959, Wachuku was chairman of the Business Committee in the House of Representatives of Nigeria. He was also a member of the Parliamentary Committee on the Nigerianization of the Federal Civil Service. He wrote the committee's Report assisted by Michael O. Ani. In 1959, Wachuku was re-elected into the House of Representatives from Aba Division; and was, subsequently, elected the first indigenous Speaker of the Nigerian House of Representatives.

Rhoda and Jaja

=== Marriage ===
In 1951, Wachuku married fellow Nigerian: Rhoda Idu Oona Onumonu (1920–1994). She fondly called her husband "Anucha." She attended primary school in Oguta, Imo State; and, later, went to Women Training College, Umuahia; as well as Achimota College, Gold Coast (Ghana). Also, she studied at Glasgow and West of Scotland College of Domestic Science.

Wachuku and Rhoda had five children, namely: Chinedum, Nwabueze (married to Professor Chuka Nwokolo and now Mrs. Nwabueze Nwokolo), Ndubuisi (married to Ukachi, née Offurum), Emenuwa (married to Ijeoma, née Ekwulugo) and Idu. Also, after the devastating Nigerian–Biafran civil war, Wachuku adopted numerous orphans, including: John Ochiabuto, James Ikechukwu, Nwaobilor, Ebere, Nkemdilim, Sylvia Amama, Efuru, etc.

=== First Speaker of the House ===
Wachuku in Speaker of the House Regalia

From 1959 to 1960, Wachuku was the first indigenous Speaker of the House of Representatives of Nigeria. Wachuku replaced Sir Frederic Metcalfe of Great Britain, who was Speaker of the House from 1955 to 1959; and during Wachuku's Speakership, "State Opening of Parliament" was "on October 3, 1960, by her Majesty’s Special Representative, Princess Alexandra of Kent." Notably, as First Speaker of the House, Wachuku received Nigeria's Instrument of Independence – also known as Freedom Charter, on Saturday 1 October 1960 from Princess Alexandra of Kent – Queen Elizabeth II of Great Britain's representative at the Nigerian Independence ceremonies. On a 1960 United States tour as the House of Representatives Speaker, Wachuku was honoured and presented with the City of Philadelphia, Pennsylvania Blue Seal and Key to the City of Atlanta, Georgia. As Speaker of the House; and subsequently, Wachuku, during the civil rights movement, unwaveringly supported African Americans plus all Americans and humankind of goodwill who saw the humane, enriching need for true and respectful racial equality.

During this period, and during his tenure as Nigeria’s first Minister of Foreign Affairs, Wachuku was reported to have developed personal and professional relationships with several prominent international figures, including U.S. Presidents Dwight D. Eisenhower, John F. Kennedy, and Lyndon B. Johnson. Sources have also described him as having associations with individuals such as Sam Rayburn, Adlai Stevenson II, Martin Luther King Jr., Marian Anderson, Nelson Rockefeller, Henry Ford II, Israel’s Golda Meir, and Soviet leader Nikita Khrushchev, among others.

Wachuku with US President John F. Kennedy and Martin Luther King Jr.

=== First Ambassador to the United Nations ===
Notably, Time magazine described him as "Nigeria's dynamic U.N. Ambassador" – stating that because of his worthy, very lively and enthusiastic diplomatic style with a lot of energy, wisdom and determination: "Nigeria, less than two months after winning its independence, is on its way to becoming one of the major forces in Africa."

From 1960 to 1961, Wachuku served as first Ambassador and Permanent Representative of Nigeria to the United Nations in New York, as well as Federal Minister for Economic Development. He hoisted Nigeria's flag as the 99th member of the United Nations on 7 October 1960. Accordingly, Wachuku was instrumental to Nigeria becoming the 58th Member State of United Nations Educational, Scientific and Cultural Organization (UNESCO) on Monday 14 November 1960. Also, as First Ambassador of Nigeria to the United Nations, Wachuku represented the country at the independence celebrations of Tanganyika – now known as United Republic of Tanzania. He pretended to sleep during UN meeting in 1960 after he had been denied the opportunity to express his dissatisfaction with a racial remark. At the United Nations, with support from UN Secretary General Dag Hammarskjöld, the member nations elected Wachuku the first African to chair a United Nations Conciliation Commission, making him Chairman of the Conciliation Commission for the Congo from January to March 1961. Initial proposal and nomination of Wachuku to be mediator in Congo came from Paul-Henri Spaak of Belgium, to which "Wachuku responded favorably on condition that U Thant, Cyrille Adoula and Moïse Tshombe agree."

Following a cabinet reshuffle at Nigeria's independence, Wachuku was appointed Minister of Economic Development and Member of the First Nigerian Delegation on the admission of Nigeria to the United Nations. On the eve of his departure from New York, the Prime Minister Sir Abubakar Tafawa Balewa invited Wachuku to his hotel suite and told him that he was leaving him behind as Leader of the Delegation and Ambassador plus Permanent Representative of Nigeria to the United Nations. Wachuku protested to Prime Minister Balewa – saying that he did not join the Delegation with the intention of staying in New York, and that he told his wife, Rhoda, that he would be away for only one week. Balewa replied: "Never mind, I will tell her when I arrive Lagos."

At the United Nations, he soon stood out in service to humankind, including a speech to the General Assembly which national and international media commended for his lambasting of the Eastern and Western Blocs for not ending their differences and quarrels when he stated: "I am losing confidence in the great powers. They are climbing from the pedestal of greatness to the pedestal of insanity. We expect leadership from them; they give us destruction. We expect wisdom from them; they give us lack of knowledge...."

Under Wachuku's leadership at the United Nations, both the Nigerian Army and the Nigerian Police Force made their début with the UN peacekeeping effort. During his time at the United Nations, Nigeria's Major-General Johnson Aguiyi-Ironsi was appointed Commander of the United Nations Peacekeeping Force in the Congo. Also, the first Nigerian Permanent Secretary, Mr. Francis Nwokedi, was retained by the United Nations to help in the reorganisation of the Civil Service in the Congo. Wachuku also secured the appointment of the first African Under-Secretary-General of the United Nations – Nigeria's Godfrey K. J. Amachree – who became UN Under Secretary-General for Trusteeship and Non-Self-Governing Territories.

=== Minister for Foreign Affairs ===
In 1961, Wachuku was appointed Nigeria's inaugural Minister of Foreign Affairs and Commonwealth Relations. Wachuku served in the role until 1965. Prior to Wachuku's tenure, Prime Minister Balewa doubled as the country's foreign affairs advocate.

Concerning Wachuku becoming Minister for Foreign Affairs and Commonwealth Relations, the last colonial Governor-General of Nigeria, Sir James Wilson Robertson, sent a report to Iain Macleod, UK Secretary of State for the Colonies, stating that:

"It seems unlikely that the Prime Minister will make many changes in his Cabinet on independence. I believe he intends to recommend Mr. Jaja Wachuku to me to be the Foreign Minister; not Mallam Maitama Sule, who has been rumoured as a possibility. Mr. Wachuku is a lawyer from the Eastern Region and is at present Speaker of the House of Representatives. He is an intelligent young man who has held somewhat extreme nationalist views, but is now settling down. If the Prime Minister can keep him in reasonable control, he might do very well. He will probably associate with him a Northerner as Minister of State."

On 14 July 1962, Wachuku was decorated with the insignia of the Commander of the Order of the Niger Republic, in recognition of "services to the People of the Republic of Niger" by President Hamani Diori. As Foreign Affairs Minister, Wachuku organised the Afro/Asian group of States and worked to get Liberia voted into the United Nations Security Council, and Ethiopia into the UN Economic and Social Council. He also worked towards the amendment of the United Nations Charter – increasing the Security Council from eleven to fifteen – taking into account African nations.

It was concerning this period in Nigeria's history that Ambassador Owen W. Roberts, United States' 1964 to 1965 Political Officer in Lagos, said:

"Nigerians, whatever their tribe, are a very strong, very assertive group. Foreign Minister Jaja Wachuku was a surprise for many American diplomats because he considered himself as having a status equivalent to the British, French, German, or Russian Ministers. Wachuku demanded that much attention and respect. The Nigerians were, and have been, very independent. Senior U.S. echelons weren't used to dealing with Africans as assertive and as strong minded as the Nigerians were. I found this nice because the Nigerians were absolutely always open with you, and would hit you over the head with whatever the problem was. They were entitled to respect and helped gain it for Africans. Ambassador Matthews was not the kind of person to go in and tell Prime Minister Balewa or Foreign Minister Jaja Wachuku how to do things...."

Wachuku as Foreign Affairs Minister of Nigeria preferred quiet diplomacy, especially with the two major Anglo-American powers: Great Britain and the United States – in search of solutions to continental and international problems. For example, there was a lot of hue and cry as a result of the Rivonia Trial in South Africa in 1963 following the arrest of Walter Sisulu, Ahmed Kathrada, Govan Mbeki, Denis Goldberg, Raymond Mhlaba, Andrew Mlangeni, Lionel Bernstein and others. They and Nelson Mandela, who was serving term on his 1962 conviction, were charged with "sabotage and ... conspiracy to overthrow the Government by revolution and by assisting an armed invasion of South Africa by foreign troops." These charges were treasonable and carried the death penalty. Wachuku quietly invited Lord Head, the British High Commissioner in Lagos and also United States' Ambassador Joseph Palmer II – and strongly urged them to intercede with their governments to prevail on the apartheid regime in South Africa – not to impose the death penalty on Nelson Mandela and others. Wachuku employed the same quiet consultation on the matter with US Secretary of State Dean Rusk and British Foreign Secretary Lord Home. Subsequently, Lionel Bernstein was acquitted and Mandela and the rest were given life imprisonment terms.

Humane and successful diplomatic efforts by Wachuku to save Mandela and others from death penalty at the Rivonia Trial were given more light by University of North Carolina at Chapel Hill Henry Brandis Professor of Law Emeritus: Kenneth S. Broun, in his published book: Saving Nelson Mandela: The Rivonia Trial and the Fate of South Africa . Professor Broun points out that Sir Hugh Stephenson, United Kingdom's Ambassador to South Africa, met with Foreign Minister Hilgard Muller of South Africa with regard to "the Wachuku request" that Mandela and others must not be sentenced to death. When Stephenson mentioned Wachuku's stand to Muller, Muller responded by saying that Wachuku's position was "very interesting." Muller went on to say that the South African government had utmost respect for Wachuku and that at the United Nations General Assembly, Wachuku had made a oneness-of-humankind, "helpful speech" wherein Wachuku stated that "white people were also Africans." Afterwards, Stephenson reported to the British government and Wachuku that his impression was that "death sentences would not be carried out" on Nelson Mandela and others based on the request by Wachuku.

Wachuku and Golda Meir: Prime Minister of Israel

Wachuku, like Hegel's historical individual, had the capacity to stand outside the confines of his time, place and intuiting history. He sought his vindication in historical reality. The Right Honourable Prime Minister Sir Abubakar Tafawa Balewa recognised and appreciated Wachuku's outstanding essence; and used to tell him that he was ten or more years ahead of his Government cabinet colleagues. Wachuku's uncanny historical intuition was evident from the start when, in 1947, he proclaimed Lagos an All-Nigerian city – long before that city became a federal territory. Wachuku also foresaw the danger of recognising military coup as a way to change government. In Ethiopia, he strongly refused to accord recognition to the Nicolas Grunitzky Government in Togo after 13 January 1963 first coup in that country. Wachuku believed that if that first African coup by the Togolese army was recognised as a way to change government, then, coup-making would spread in Africa.

In Addis Ababa, during the Inaugural Conference of the Organization of African Unity (OAU), Emperor Haile Selassie I of Ethiopia sat Wachuku down in the presence of Prime Minister Abubakar Tafawa Balewa and begged Balewa to plead with Wachuku to accept that the Togolese government be admitted to take part in that first OAU Conference. Wachuku jokingly reminded Emperor Haile Selassie and Prime Minister Balewa that, as Foreign Minister, he was only number three in the Nigerian Government, and that coup plotters go for numbers one and two – President or Head of State and Prime Minister. Wachuku added that by the time coup makers got to number three, he would be resting in his village.

At the end, Wachuku refused to change his diplomatic position of not allowing Togo to participate because the Togolese Government came to power by coup. Therefore, Togo became the only independent African country that was not represented at the Inaugural Conference of the OAU. History has already told us whether Wachuku was right or wrong. Even Kwame Nkrumah who was one of the most vocal supporters of the Togolese government of coup makers, later fell victim of the coup contagion. As for Wachuku, he had resigned from the Nigerian parliament and government at midday of 14 January 1966 – twelve hours before the first Nigerian military coup of 15 January 1966 led by Major Chukwuma Kaduna Nzeogwu.

Wachuku and US President Dwight D. Eisenhower

In a public lecture titled "Nigeria: The Blackman's Burden", delivered on 24 February 2005 at the Nigerian Institute of International Affairs to mark the 28th Anniversary of the Black and African Festival of Arts and Culture and the 2005 Black History Month, it was also concerning Wachuku at the founding period in Nigeria's Foreign Policy that Professor Bolaji Akinyemi (1985 to 1987 Nigerian External Affairs Minister) said:

Karl Marx must have had Togo in mind when he wrote in the Eighteenth Brumaire of Louis Napoleon, "Hegel says somewhere that all great events and personalities in world history reappear in one fashion or another. He forgot to add: the first time as tragedy, the second as farce". In 1963, when President Sylvanus Olympio was assassinated, Wachuku condemned the action and added that, for security reasons, the Nigerian boundary was the Togo–Ghana boundary. He was roundly condemned. Looks like he was just speaking forty years out of turn. He would be pleased to know that Nigeria had caught up with him. And that should also be a lesson to those who think that Nigerian foreign policy started and ended up with them.

As Foreign Affairs Minister, Wachuku attended the third annual conference of the American Society of African Culture (AMSAC), held in Philadelphia in 1960. Concerning Wachuku's impact at that AMSAC conference, historian Michael Crowder later wrote:

Continuing interest among the black intelligentsia in African culture was signalled by the creation of the American Society of African Culture (AMSAC) in 1956, which restricted membership to persons of African descent.... Its third annual conference, in Philadelphia in 1960, devoted itself to the discussion of 'African Unities and Pan-Africanism', and can be regarded as an event in the history of the movement. Some of those present had strong links with the Pan-Africanist past, notably Rayford W. Logan, who had played an important part in the era of Pan-African congresses after the First World War; Jean Price-Mars, Haitian diplomat, philosopher of négritude, and President of the Société Africaine de Culture in Paris; and Jaja Wachuku, who had been at the 1945 Pan-African Congress, and who was in 1960 foreign Minister of Nigeria....

=== Aviation minister and 1966 coup ===
Subsequently, from 1965 to midday 14 January 1966, Wachuku was Specific First Minister for Aviation of Nigeria. With most of the aviation laws in Nigeria bearing his signature, Wachuku initiated training programmes for Nigeria's first crop of Flight and Ground Officers. The Aviation Training Centre, Zaria was established during his tenure.

Notably, Wachuku's visionary and upright zeal, however, did not go well with his party, the NCNC – a party which saw Mr. A. K. Blankson, Nigeria Airways Board chairman and also the party's Central Working Committee chairman, as representing NCNC's interest in the spoils system. From the Chairmanship of the Nigeria Airways Board, Wachuku fired and removed Blankson who felt himself beyond ministerial control. His party, the NCNC demanded the reinstatement of Blankson – otherwise the party would withdraw its Ministers from the coalition government. Thus, Nigeria was faced with a potential crisis which would have compounded the already grave state of emergency in the country.

The Prime Minister, Sir Abubakar Tafawa Balewa, pleaded with Wachuku to reinstate the Nigeria Airways Board chairman and accept another ministry. Wachuku refused. Balewa even asked his wife Rhoda Idu Jaja Wachuku to plead with him, yet he refused and tendered his resignation from Parliament and as an Executive Member of Government midday 14 January 1966. Balewa was yet to accept Wachuku's resignation when the army struck by mid-night; barely 12 hours later – thus ushering in the era of military coups in Nigeria. Wachuku's official residence, at 7, Okotie-Eboh Street Ikoyi, Lagos, was surrounded by soldiers. His younger brother: Kennedy Madu Wachuku, father of Ugonna Wachuku was with him that day, Wachuku looked through the window in the early hours of the morning and asked the soldiers: "What are you boys doing here?" One of the soldiers replied: "Good morning, Sir. But haven't you heard what is happening in the country?" To which Wachuku replied: "Yes. I know you boys have taken over the Government." And the soldier said: "Do not be afraid, Sir. We have come to protect you for being an honest Government Minister." Wachuku survived the military coup.

=== Civil war in Nigeria ===
Wachuku retired to his home town, first to Aba and subsequently to Nbawsi, his village when Aba fell during the Nigerian – Biafran war that lasted from July 1967 to January 1970. During the Biafran war, he participated in the struggle of his Igbo people for freedom and justice against a country that had rejected them by not protecting them from genocide and brutality by its marauding soldiers and citizens. Later, during the war, Wachuku fell out with the Government of Chukwuemeka Odumegwu Ojukwu because he spoke out against the recruitment of child soldiers. He was arrested and detained by the Ojukwu Government. And was, at the end of the Biafran war released by a young Nigerian Army Officer called Theophilus Danjuma.

The Nigerian soldiers were shocked and dismayed that their first Speaker of the House of Representatives, first Ambassador to the United Nations and first Foreign Affairs Minister was in detention for exercising his freedom of speech and fundamental human rights. So, Theophilus Danjuma and his military battalion gave Wachuku adequate protection and security. Wachuku was escorted home by Nigerian soldiers. And he managed to prevent the looting and destruction of his library located at his country home in Nbawsi Abia State. Wachuku's library was described as the biggest one man library in West Africa by regional and national media. Prime Minister Abubakar Tafawa Balewa used to call Wachuku the most "Bookish Minister".

After the Biafran war, Wachuku was involved in Community development affairs while practising his law profession. From 1970 to 1978, he served as Chairman of Nbawsi and Umuomainta Town Council, and also chairman Nsulu Community Council. He was also a Founding Member of the Movement for the creation of Imo State, and leader, until his death, of the Movement for the creation of Aba State.

=== Second Republic politics ===
Jaja Wachuku

During Nigeria's second republic (1979 to 1984), Wachuku was, on the platform of the Nigerian Peoples Party (NPP), twice (1978 and 1983) elected Senator representing Aba Senatorial Zone of Africa's most populous country. At the Senate of Nigeria, he became NPP Leader and chairman of the Senate Foreign Relations Committee. During this period, he made various dangerous secret trips to South Africa for meetings with President Pieter Willem Botha to put pressure on him for the dismantling of the obnoxious apartheid system; including the unconditional pardon and release of Nelson Mandela and other political prisoners.

It was during this period that, on the floor of the Nigerian Senate, Wachuku made his famous, prophetic statement that the defeat of apartheid in South Africa "shall flow from the barrels of dialogue and contact, not from the barrels of isolation and guns...". He was later removed from the Foreign Relations Committee because of officially calling for dialogue with South Africa. During the 1990 years, when Nigeria started diplomatic relations with South Africa, most prominent politicians and historians in the country called for an apology to Wachuku. In 1983, he was re-elected to the Nigerian Senate until the military coup of December 1983.

== Honours and awards ==
Wachuku received many honours during his lifetime. In Nigeria, he was the holder of the chieftaincy title of Ugo Ngwa (meaning Eagle and Pride of Ngwa People). This title was first conferred on him by the entire Ngwa nation in 1949, but he was only able to be formally invested in 1971. Other honours included: City of Philadelphia, Pennsylvania Blue Seal, Key to the City of Atlanta, Georgia: USA: United States of America presented to Wachuku by Mayor: William B. Hartsfield of Atlanta during the week of Wednesday 6 July 1960, Time "Pride of Africa" Commendation, Commander of the Order of Niger Republic, CFR Nigeria: Commander of the Order of the Federal Republic of Nigeria, LL.D: Doctor of Laws Honoris Causa by Trinity College, University of Dublin, Ireland, KSC: Knight of Saint Christopher by the Anglican Church Nigeria, Enyi Abia (or Elephant of Abia, symbolizing wisdom, memory and strength) - an Abia State chieftaincy title; plus a Merit Award by the Government of Abia State.

Jaja Wachuku receiving Key to the City of Atlanta from Mayor William B. Hartsfield on Wednesday: 6 July 1960

Posthumous special Golden Jubilee Independence Anniversary Award was conferred on Wachuku by President Goodluck Jonathan of Nigeria on 30 September 2010. Hero of the Struggle for Nigeria's Independence from Great Britain and a Pioneer Political Leader Honour for Wachuku by President Jonathan on 28 February 2014 during Nigeria's 100-year anniversary celebrations. Friday 6 March 2020 "Prominent Portrait" Honour from College Historical Society: Trinity College Dublin: University of Dublin: Ireland on Two Hundred and Fifty Years Anniversary of the college's Historical Society: 1770–2020.

28 April 2025 "Trinity Monday Discourse" with "Jaja Wachuku" honoured as "Subject" by University of Dublin in a Presentation by Professor Patrick Geoghegan, Director of Trinity College Dublin Long Room Hub for History. On 1 January 2026, Abia State Government led by Governor Alex Otti honoured Wachuku with a 108th Posthumous Birthday Ceremony; including the opening of Wachuku's rebuilt Country Home, containing his extensive Library; plus the redesigned Tomb of Wachuku and that of his Wife: Rhoda within their compound

== Death ==
Born in 1918, Wachuku was 78 years on his death at the University of Nigeria Teaching Hospital in Enugu, during the late morning of Thursday, 7 November 1996. Wachuku's nephew, author Ugonna Wachuku, wrote a poetic dedication to his uncle titled: Some Memories Never Die. On 20 October 1961, Time wrote an article and news report on Wachuku and his diplomatic activities at the United Nations entitled "Pride of Africa."

== See also ==
- Nigerian First Republic
- Nigerian Second Republic
- Chuku Wachuku
- Nwabueze Jaja Wachuku
- History of Nigeria

== Sources ==
- American Aviation Publications. World Aviation Directory, American Aviation Publications, 2000
- Anyaoku, Emeka. The Missing Headlines: Selected Speeches, Liverpool University Press, 1997
- Australia Department of External Affairs. Current Notes on International Affairs, Department of Foreign Affairs of Australia, 1972
- Barros, Romeo Julius. African States and the United Nations Versus Apartheid: The Efforts of the African States to Affect South Africa's Apartheid Policy Through the United Nations, Carlton Press, 1967
- Black, Joseph E.; Thompson, Kenneth W. Foreign Policies in a World of Change, Harper & Row, 1963
- Boyd, Andrew. Fifteen Men on a Powder Keg: A History of the U.N. Security Council, Stein and Day, 1971
- Broun, Kenneth S. Saving Nelson Mandela: The Rivonia Trial and the Fate of South Africa (Pivotal Moments in World History), Oxford University Press USA, 2012
- Burns, Eedson Louis Millard Defence in the Nuclear Age: An Introduction for Canadians, Clark, Irwin, 1976
- Chatterjee, Dwarka Nath Storm Over the Congo, Vikas, 1980
- Clark, Trevor. A Right Honourable Gentleman: Abubakar From the Black Rock: A Narrative Chronicle of the Life and Times of Nigeria's Alhaji Sir Abubakar Tafawa Balewa, Edward Arnold, Sevenoaks, Kent, 1991
- Dar es Salaam Institute of Public Administration University College. Case Studies in African Diplomacy, Oxford University Press, 1969
- Doro. Marion E.; Maynard Stultz, Newell. Governing in Black Africa: Perspectives on New States, Prentice.Hall, 1970
- Dudziak, Mary L. Cold War Civil Rights: Race and the Image of American Democracy, Princeton University Press, 2002
- Eisenhower, Dwight David, United States President [1953–1961]. Dwight David Eisenhower: Containing the Public Messages, Speeches, United States Government Printing Office, 1960
- Gordenker, Leon. The UN Secretary-General and the Maintenance of Peace, Columbia University Press, 1967
- Great Britain Colonial Office. Annual Report on Nigeria, Her Majesty's Stationery Office, 1961
- Great Britain: Office of Commonwealth Relations. The Commonwealth Relations Office Year Book, Her Majesty's Stationery Office, 1966
- Gyorgy, Andrew; Gibbs, S.Hubert. Problems in International Relations, Prentice-Hall, 1962
- Harris, Joseph E. Global Dimensions of the African Diaspora, Howard University Press, 1993
- Hovet, Thomas. Africa in the United Nations, Northwestern University Press, 1963
- India Ministry of Information and Broadcasting. Jawaharlal Nehru: Homage, Ministry of Information and Broadcasting, India, 1964
- Indian Political Science Association. The Indian Journal of Political Science, Volume 35, Number 4: October to December 1974
- Lipsky, Mortimer. Never Again War: The Case for World Government, A. S. Barnes, 1971
- Marvin, David Keith. Emerging Africa in World Affairs, Chandler Publishing Company, 1965
- Maynard, Newell Stultz; Doro, Marion E. Governing in Black Africa: Perspectives on New States, Prentice-Hall, 1970
- Mazrui, Al'Amin; Ostergard, Robert L.; Laermont, Ricardo Rene. Power, Politics, and the African Condition: Collected Essays of Ali A. Mazuri, Africa World Press, 2004
- Nwokolo, Nwabueze [nee Wachuku – Jaja Wachuku's daughter]. Wachuku Jaja Anucha C.R.N., C.F.R, Ugo Ngwa, K.S.C, Enyi Abia: 1918 – 1996 – Jaja Wachuku's Funeral Booklet, DLF Services, Solihull, England, 1997
- Office of the Historian: United States Department of State: Search results for Wachuku
- Okochi, Ibe N. A. Nigeria's Africa Policy – A Study of Her Role in the African Unification Movement (1960–1973), Cross Continent Press Limited, Lagos, Nigeria, 1990.
- Passin, H; Jones-Quartey, K. A. B. Africa: The Dynamic of Change, Ibadan University Press, 1963
- Peters, Joel. Israel and Africa: The Problematic Friendship, I.B. Tauris Publishers, 1992
- Rikhye, Indar Jit. Military Adviser to the Secretary-General: United Nations Peace Keeping and the Congo Crisis, International Peace Academy, 1993, page 180
- Royal Institute of International Affairs. Chronology of International Events, Royal Institute of International Affairs, 1956
- Schlegel, John P. Deceptive Ash: Bilingualism and Canadian Policy in Africa: 1957 – 1971 University Press of America, 1978
- Segal, Ronald; Hoskyns, Catherine; Ainslie, Rosalynde. Political Africa: A Who's Who of Personalities and Parties Frederick A. Praeger, 1961
- Stolper, Wolfgang F.; Gray, Clive S. Inside Independent Nigeria: Diaries of Wolfgang Stolper, 1960–1962, Ashgate Publishing, Ltd., 2003
- Tewary, Indra Narayan. The Peace-keeping Power of the United Nations General Assembly, S. Chand, 1974
- "1851 to Present". The New York Times.
- Theobald, Robert. The UN and Its Future, H.W. Wilson, 1963
- UNESCO. UNESCO Chronicle, United Nations Educational, Scientific and Cultural Organization, 1980
- United Nations. Delegations to the General Assembly, United Nations, 1972
- United States Congress: Senate Committee on Foreign Relations. Executive Sessions of the Senate Foreign Relations Committee, Supt. of Docs., 1976
- United States Department of State. Department of State News Letter, Bureau of Administration, American Diplomatic and Consular Service, 1980
- United States of America Department of State. Educational and Cultural Diplomacy, United States Department of State, 1962
- Wachuku, Alozie N. Jaja Anucha Wachuku: A Profile. Programme and Order of Funeral Service, Saturday 15 February 1997
- Wachuku, Jaja; Millar MacLure; Douglas George Anglin; et al. Africa: the political pattern [essays], University of Toronto Press, 1961
- Wachuku, Ugonna Onuabuchi. Some Memories Never Die, Postpoems.org, 2001
- Wachuku, Ugonna. The Great Place: A Soulful Celebration of the Beautiful South African People, Publish America Incorporated, 2004
- Wachuku, Ugonna American Galaxy: Celebrating the People and the Land of the Free and the Home of the Brave. 2012
- Wallerstein, Immanuel. Africa: The Politics of Independence and Unity, University of Nebraska Press, 2005
- Walraven, Klaas van. Dreams of Power: The Role of the Organization of African Unity in the Politics of Africa, 1963–1993, University of Michigan, Ashgate, 1999.
- Waziri, Mahmud. Stewardship, My Vision for Nigeria: Collected Speeches of a Nigerian Senator, Sahel Publishers, 1987
- West African Court of Appeal [WACA]. Selected Judgments of the West African Court of Appeal, Government Printing Department, 1960
- Woodson, Carter Godwin; Whittingham, Rayford Logan. The Journal of Negro History, Association for the Study of Negro Life and History, United Publishing Corp., Washington, D.C. [1969]
- Zartman, William. International Relations in the New Africa, Prentice-Hall, 1966
