= Ron Campbell (ice hockey) =

Ronald Campbell, M.Sc, BBA (born 1957 in Detroit, Michigan) is the former President and Alternate Governor of the Tampa Bay Lightning of the NHL. He previously worked for the Detroit Pistons of the NBA.

== Early life ==
Ronald Campbell was born in Detroit, Michigan and received a B.B.A. from Eastern Michigan University in 1977 and in December 1990, earned his M.S. in Finance from Walsh College.

== Career ==
Campbell started working for the Detroit Pistons in 1984 and became the Executive Vice President for Palace Sports & Entertainment in 1992.

Campbell became president for the Lightning in 1999 upon purchase of Lightning by William Davidson.

In 2008, Campbell assumed role as senior advisor to the ownership of the Lightning during transition of new ownership (upon death of William Davidson), Oren Koules, Len Barrie while continuing his role of Executive Vice President for Palace Sports & Entertainment.

Campbell was named in a sexual harassment suit from a former employee of a Belleair Bluffs financial services firm in February, 2020.

He is currently COO for Seminoles Companies. Campbell also serves on many Tampa Bay area boards, including the board of The Moffitt Cancer Foundation, The Copperheads Charities Valspar Championship, and The Tampa Bay Sports Commission.

== Awards and achievements ==
- 2004 Stanley Cup championship (Tampa Bay)
- Selected in the summer of 2000 by United States Secretary of Defense William S. Cohen to participate in the prestigious Defense Department Joint Civilian Orientation Conference.

== Personal life ==
Ronald was charged with DUI in Tampa, Florida in 2007.
