= Daniela Yaniv-Richter =

Israeli ceramist and sculptor

Daniela Yaniv-Richter דניאלה יניב-ריכטר
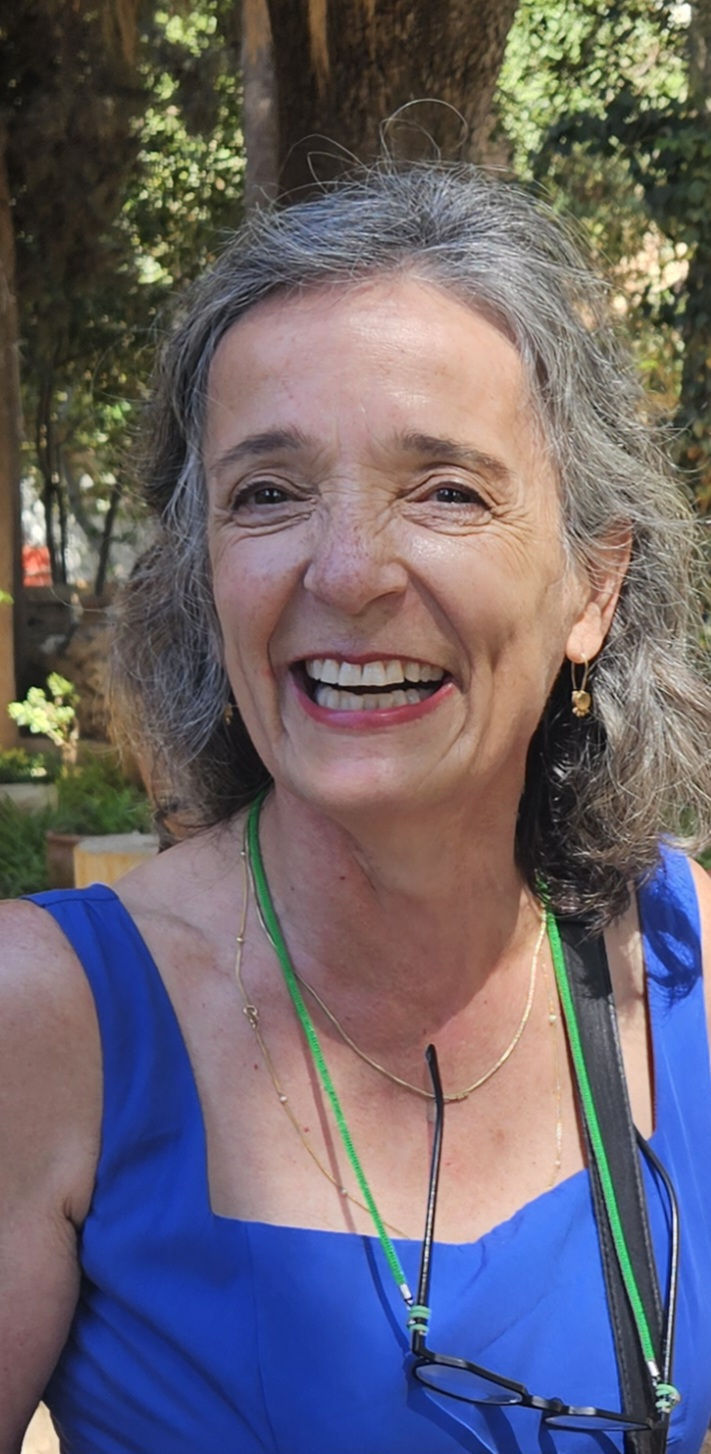
- Born: Daniela Richter; 1956 (age 69–70); Zurich, Switzerland
- Education: Bezalel, University of Michigan
- Known for: Ceramic art
- Movement: Israeli art

Daniela Yaniv-Richter (Hebrew: דניאלה יניב-ריכטר; born November 5, 1956) is an Israeli ceramist and sculptor.

== Biography ==
Yaniv-Richter was born in Zürich, Switzerland, and made aliyah to Israel in 1975. She graduated from the Bezalel Academy of Arts and Design, Jerusalem in 1982. She studied further in the Eastern Michigan University till 1983, then proceeded to MFA studies at the University of Michigan, Ann Arbor. She received her MFA in 1985.

Among other subjects, her works deals with the replication of natural and man-made objects. In the past years Yaniv-Richter has put aside ceramics – her known medium of choice – and started printing textures of different materials on paper and textile.

Yaniv-Richter resides and works in Jerusalem.

== Publications ==
- Gispan-Greenberg, Tamar. "Natural Process: Daniela Yaniv-Richter", Ceramics Art and Perception, Issue 94, Dec 2013, p. 26–29 ISSN 1035-1841
- Gispan-Greenberg, Tamar. "Natural Process", Exhibition Catalog. Jerusalem Artists' House, 2012.
- Zommer, Raya. "Ready-mades from clay", Ceramics Technical, Issue 19, 2004 ISSN 1324-4175
