= Vallateen Virginia Dudley Abbington =

American civil rights activist and educator

- Born: 1907; Indiana
- Died: October 13, 2003 (aged 95–96); Los Angeles, California
- Occupations: Activist, educator, social worker

Vallateen Virginia Dudley Abbington (1907 – October 13, 2003) was an African American activist, educator, and social worker. She is known for being the plaintiff in Abbington v. Board of Education of Louisville, where she fought for the equalization of teacher's salaries in Louisville, Kentucky.

== Personal life and education ==
Vallateen Virginia Dudley Abbington was born in rural Indiana in 1907 and was one of eight children. She attended Michigan State Normal College, where she joined the sorority Alpha Kappa Alpha. Once she completed college she married Jesse Matthew Abbington and the pair eventually moved to Louisville and later to St. Louis, Missouri. While in Missouri, Abbington completed a Master's in social work.

Abbington died on October 13, 2003, in Los Angeles, California, and is buried in the Jefferson Barracks National Cemetery in St. Louis.

== Civil rights ==
While living in Louisville, Abbington taught at Jackson Junior High School. She noted that she and other African American teachers were paid far less than their white peers, which led her to join forces with the NAACP to bring the issue to court in the 1940 case Abbington v. Board of Education of Louisville. Prior to this the NAACP had experienced issues with locating a teacher willing to go forward with a lawsuit, as many black teachers were afraid of losing their jobs during the Great Depression. In the suit she argued for pay equality, as Abbington and other African American teachers earned from $1,490 while white teachers earned $1,750. The lawsuit went to the Federal District Court and the school board informed Abbington that they would provide equal pay for all if she dropped her case against them, which they did in 1941. This was the third such case for the NAACP and the first such case in Kentucky.

After moving to St. Louis, Abbington continued to remain active with civil rights and tried to desegregate both the area's low-income public housing and her church, Trinity Episcopal.
