= Larry Warren =

American businessman

Larry Warren, M.A., on February 12, 2013, was named interim CEO of Trinity Health System in Livonia, Michigan.

Warren was appointed as the new CEO of Howard University Hospital, as of August, in Washington, D.C. He formerly served as executive director of UMHHC, and as associate vice president of the U-M Health System, since March 1998. Before his full appointment, he served nearly two years as interim executive director.

In addition to his new four-year term, he will receive a new title, director and chief executive officer of UMHHC, on March 12, 2004. The reappointment also continues his current title within the UMHS leadership, and his adjunct professorship in the U-M School of Public Health.

Warren has 30 years of experience in human resource management and hospital administration, including 26 years at the UM. Before becoming interim executive director in 1996, he served as a personnel representative and compensation analyst, employment manager, assistant personnel administrator, associate hospital director, and chief operating officer.

He earned a bachelor's degree in business administration in 1972 and a master's degree in education administration in 1973 from Eastern Michigan University.

Warren holds the following external committee/board appointments:

- State of Michigan Hospital Advisory Commission, Appointed by the governor to a three-year term, 2002–2005
- American Red Cross board of directors
- Michigan Health & Hospital Association Executive Committee and board of directors
- Michigan Hospital Association Participating Hospital Agreement Steering Committee
- Council of Teaching Hospitals board of directors
- University Health System Consortium board of directors
- Greater Detroit Area Health Council board of directors
- Chelsea Community Hospital board of directors

Warren is also an active participant in the following community service organizations:

- Vice chair, Eastern Michigan University Foundation
- Ann Arbor Chamber of Commerce board of directors and executive committee
- 100 Black Men of Greater Detroit, Inc.
