= Heather Neff =

American novelist

- Born: January 1957 (age 69) Akron, Ohio, U.S.
- Occupation: Writer
- Education: Cass Technical High School; University of Michigan (BA); University of Basel; University of Zurich

Website
- heatherneffbooks.net

Heather Neff (born January 1957) is an American writer and university professor. Born in Akron, Ohio, at the age of 13 her family moved to Detroit, Michigan, where she graduated from Lewis Cass Technical High School in 1975 with a degree in music. She earned a B.A. from the University of Michigan, Ann Arbor. After graduating in 1978 she studied French at the University of Paris VII, Censier and then lived in Switzerland, where she studied at the University of Basel and the University of Zurich. She received a licentiate in English Literature and Linguistics, Comparative Literature and French Linguistics in 1987, and in 1990, a Doctorate in English Literature from the University of Zurich. Her master's thesis was on James Baldwin. Her doctoral dissertation, Redemption Songs: Protest in the Voice of Afro-Americans, 1760-1880, focused on poetry written by enslaved African Americans. While living in Zurich Neff served as a translator and English instructor for Shell Oil of Switzerland, Swiss Air and Condor Film Studios. She subsequently taught at the University of the Virgin Islands in St. Croix, United States Virgin Islands. Currently Neff is a professor of English at Eastern Michigan University in Ypsilanti, Michigan, where she specializes in the literature of the African Diaspora. Neff is the author of eight novels and has published her short stories and poetry. The founder of Whittaker Road Works, a creative writing collective in Ypsilanti, she has also edited three anthologies of the group's writing. Neff currently serves as the director of the Eastern Michigan University McNair Scholars Program, one of the U.S. Department of Education's TRiO programs, and serves as editor of the Eastern Michigan University McNair Scholars Research Journal.

== Publications ==
=== Fiction ===
- Blackgammon (2000) by One World/Random House "Blackgammon" follows twenty-five years in the lives of two Black women and artist and a scholar, who make their lives in England and Paris.
- Wisdom (2002), by One World/Random House, tells the story of a woman with ovarian cancer who travels to St. Croix to learn about her family and uncovers a remarkable history of duplicity, heritage and her own lost identity. Wisdom was named an Honor Book by the American Library Association’s Black Caucus.
- Accident of Birth (2004) by Harlem Moon/Doubleday. The novel delves into the lifelong love between an African American woman and a Liberian student, whose cultural differences both unite them and tear them apart.
- Haarlem (2005) by Harlem Moon/Doubleday. A book set in the Netherlands, Haarlem tells the story of an African American man in search of his mother, while struggling to remain sober in a world which reveals unexpected challenges to his life and his heart.
  - Review, Black Issues Book Reviews
- Leila: The Weighted Silence of Memory. (August, 2009)/Booksurge. A modern day slave narrative set in Morocco, "Leila" depicts the desperate challenges faced by a 12-year-old girl sold into slavery by her father.
- "Leila II: The Moods of the Sea" (September, 2014)/Createspace. This sequel to "Leila: The Weighted Silence of Memory," describes Leila's attempts to overcome the physical, emotional and sexual trauma of her past, while finding the strength to confront her former captors.
- Blissfield (January 2019)/Booksurge. A tale of family trauma, lost love, and the quest to recover one's past in order to create the future, Bethany Celeste Castle struggles to overcome the physical and emotional damage caused by her viciously abusive father, and to seek out the brother and sister whose love made her whole.
- Saffron Bloom (forthcoming, 2021)/Booksurge. A coming-of-age story in which a young woman undertakes a journey from Detroit's Cass Corridor through the hallowed halls of the Ivy League and on to our nation's capital, while wrestling with the love of two very different men who have shaped her past, her present, and perhaps her future.

=== Academic ===
- Redemption Songs: The voice of protest in the poetry of Afro-Americans. (Franke Verlag, 1990),

and a number of articles:

- "Decoding Mixed Signals: Surviving the Demise of Affirmative Action"
- "Creating Sanctuary: The Ideal of Europe on the Writing of African Americans"
- "Heritage, Heresy and Relevance: Recontextualizing the Canon"
- "Strange Face in the Mirror: The Ethics of Cultural Diversity in Children's Film"

== Achievements ==
- Distinguished Faculty Award for Excellence in Teaching, (2000) the highest instructional honor offered by Eastern Michigan University
- Michigan Distinguished Professor (2007)
- Eastern Michigan University Alumni Association Teaching Excellence Award (2008)
