= Lee E. Brasseur =

American academic

Lee Ellen Brasseur is an American Professor of technical communication at the Department of English at the Illinois State University, and expert in the field of visualization, known from her 2003 book "Visualizing Technical Information: A Cultural Critique".

== Biography ==
Brasseur received a B.A. from Western Michigan University, an M.A. at Eastern Michigan University, and a D.A. from the University of Michigan in Ann Arbor.

In 1990 she started working at the Department of English at the Illinois State University. Until 2005 she has been teaching courses in visual rhetoric and technical writing. From 1998 to 1999 she was Director of the Technical Writing Program at Illinois State University. She served as Associate Chair, Department of English at Illinois State University. She has been working as consultant for several publishing firms. And since 1999 she is Editorial Reviewer for the journal Technical Communication Quarterly.

In 1994 Brasseur received a Nomination for University Research Initiative Award by the College of Arts and Sciences, Illinois State University. In 2004 she received a College of Arts and Sciences Outstanding Research Award in the Humanities in 2004 also from the Illinois State University.

== See also ==
- Diagram

== Publications ==
Lee E. Brasseur has written several articles and a book.

- 1997. New American families : Chinese daughters and their single mothers : adoption stories about hope and love from Our Chinese Daughters Foundation. Compiled and edited with Jane A. Liedtke. Bloomington, IL : Our Chinese Daughters Foundation.
- 2003. Visualizing Technical Information: A Cultural Critique. Amityville, NY : Baywood Publ.

Articles, a selection:

- 2001. "Critiquing the Culture of Computer Graphing Practices". In: Journal of Technical Writing and Communication. Vol 31, nr.1. pp. 27–39.
- 2004. "Contesting the Objectivist Paradigm: Gender Issues in the Technical and Professional Communication Curriculum". In: Central Works in Technical Communication. Edited by Johndan Johnson-Eilola and Stuart A. Selber. Oxford press.
- 2005. "Florence Nightingale's Visual Rhetoric in the Rose Diagrams." In: Technical Communication Quarterly 14: 2.
