= Elaine Martin =

British chemical engineer, statistician and academic

- Education: University of Glasgow; University of Strathclyde
- Awards: OBE (2007)
- Scientific career
- Workplaces: Newcastle University; University of Leeds

Elaine Barbara Martin is a chemical engineer and statistician and Head of School at the University of Leeds. She is a Fellow of the Institution of Chemical Engineers, Royal Statistical Society and Royal Academy of Engineering.

== Early life and education ==
Martin is from Glasgow. She studied Civil Engineering at the University of Glasgow, earning a Bachelor's degree in 1992. She specialised in statistics and the environment, and earned a second Bachelor's degree in statistics. She remained at Glasgow for her graduate studies, earning a PhD in statistics.

== Research ==
Martin served as a Professor of Industrial Statistics and Director of the Biopharmaceutical Bioprocessing Technology Centre at the Newcastle University. She worked on statistical process control using the M^{2} statistic. They demonstrated that the projection to latent structures is a robust multivariate linear regression technique. She compared Wold's R criterion with the Akaike information criterion. She led a project with GlaxoSmithKline, looking at microbiological techniques for pharmaceutical processes. She contributed to the 1999 book Statistics and Neural Networks: Advances at the Interface. Throughout her career she has been involved with the Engineering and Physical Sciences Research Council, and remains on their strategic advisory team.

In 2015 Martin was appointed head of school of Chemical and Process Engineering at the University of Leeds. She joined the trustee board of the Royal Academy of Engineering in 2015. She serves on the Research Committee, providing strategic oversight on UK research activity. She set up two national hubs intended to transform British manufacturing and ensure the country becomes more competitive; the Manufacture Using Advanced Powder Processes hub and the Continuous Manufacturing and Advanced Crystallisation hub. She is also Chairman of the Heads of Chemical Engineering UK, She is part of the Centre for Process Innovation (CPI) National Formulation Centre, where has worked on liquid products, developing sensors and control elements.

She serves on the governing body of the University Technical College Leeds. She is a member on the Innovation Strategy Board of the innovate UK Knowledge Transfer Network. She has judged the UK Parliamentary and Scientific Committee STEM for Britain competition.

=== Awards and honours ===
2012 Fellow of the Royal Academy of Engineering

2012 Institution of Chemical Engineers Outstanding Achievement in Chemical and Process Engineering award

2010 Institution of Chemical Engineers Project of the Year

2007 Order of the British Empire for Services to science
