= Edward Sidlow =

Edward I. Sidlow (born November 15, 1952) is associate professor of Political science at Eastern Michigan University in Ypsilanti, Michigan, United States. He also is the Political Science Department's Honors Advisor.

Sidlow has published three books, America at Odds, Freshman Orientation: House Style and Home Style, and Challenging the Incumbent. The former is a textbook co-authored with Beth Henschen, and the latter is the story of Lance Pressl's unsuccessful 2000 challenge to Rep. Phil Crane's seat in the United States House of Representatives. The book chronicles the advantages of incumbency and the struggles of the Congressional challenger.
