= John Hammink =

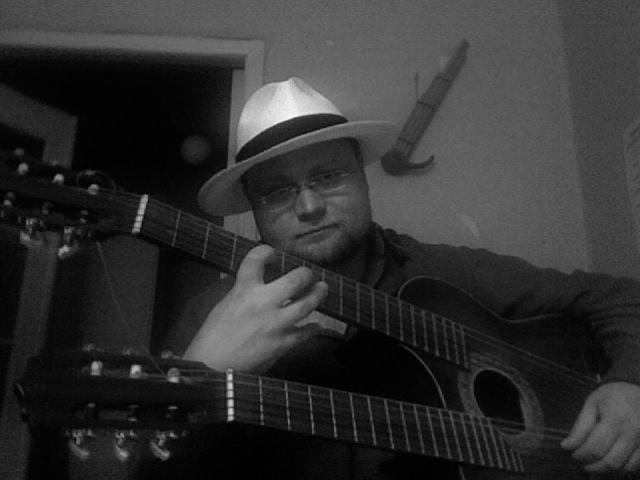
- John Hammink, with his Ecuadorian guitar

Background information
- Born: 1 May 1970 (age 56); Cleveland, Ohio, United States
- Genres: Acoustic rock rock pop world music electro Poetry; Spoken Word; Performance Art
- Instruments: Vocals, Guitar, Banjo, Contrabass, Fretless Electric bass, Drums, Percussion, Dulcimer, Drum machine, Synthesizers
- Years active: 80's–present
- Label: Studio Höör
- Website: www.Johnhammink.com

John Hammink (born May 1, 1970) is an American engineer, musician, artist and linguist.

== Biography ==
Hammink was born in Cleveland, Ohio, and graduated from Eastern Michigan University in 1993 with a B.A. in Linguistics. He emigrated to Finland in 1996 to lecture at Jyväskylä and Kajaani Polytechnics, and to Estonia in 2003. As of 2007, he has taught topics related to Product Realization and testing for software and consumer electronics at Universidad Técnica Federico Santa María in Valparaíso, Chile; Escuela Superior Politecnica del Litoral in Guayaquil, Ecuador and has advised startup companies worldwide. As of 2011, he worked at Mozilla, where he led early Quality Assurance efforts on Firefox OS.

In 2008, after a long campaign, he found a company willing to support his work on a managed care system for diabetic patients.

Hammink established a certification program for Voice over IP provider Skype, which aims to measure the quality of the user experience for all facets of hardware and software products that integrate with Skype's open API. The Skype Certification program merges practical application of the Metaphysics of Quality as proposed by Robert M. Pirsig and principles of Software inspection as proposed by Tom Gilb.

He has also toured and recorded extensively as a solo acoustic guitarist, bassist and vocalist with Russian record producer Peter Coon. During 2008 and 2009 John recorded extensively in the now defunct studio called "Studio Höör" with record producer and sound technician Daniel Westin (now founder and owner of Studio Zero Latency Records). In November 2010, he performed with Vepsian language lineup Jousnen Jarved at Liet minority-language music festival in Lorient, France.
