= Geo Rutherford =

American artist, educator, and TikToker

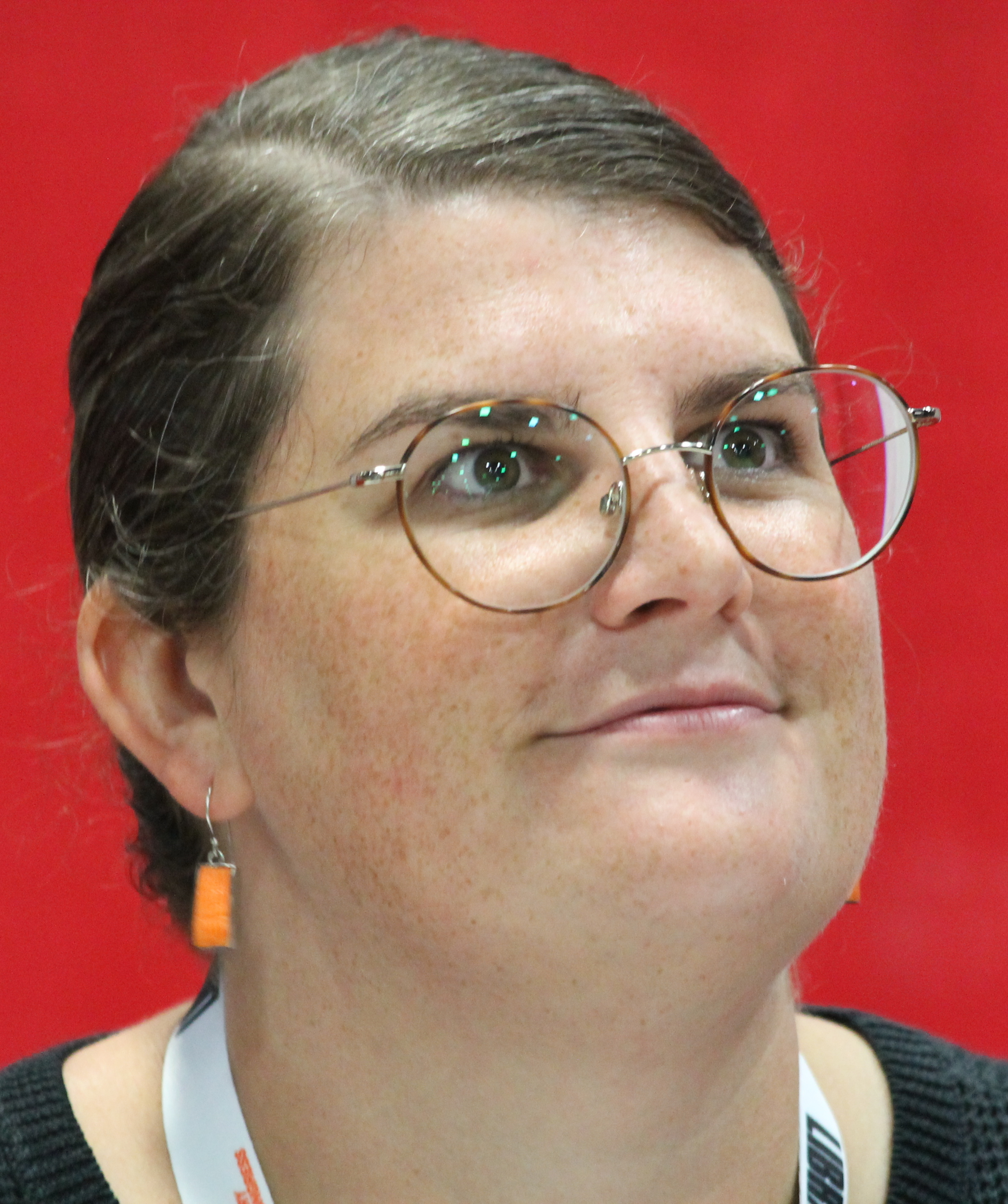
- Rutherford at the 2026 National Book Festival
- Education: Eastern Michigan University (B.A); University of Wisconsin–Milwaukee (M.A.)

TikTok information
- Page: Geo
- Years active: 2020–present
- Genre: Educational
- Followers: 1.9 million
- Last updated: October 12, 2025

Geo Rutherford (born 1984 or 1985) is an American artist, educator, and TikToker based in Milwaukee, Wisconsin. She considers herself to be a hobbyist limnologist.

== Early life and education ==
Rutherford was raised in Boulder, Colorado and Dexter, Michigan. Her mother had a PhD in geology (which was the inspiration for Rutherford's first name) and taught at Eastern Michigan University.

Rutherford first took a printmaking class in middle school, but didn't become passionate about art until high school.

After earning a bachelor's degree in art education at Eastern Michigan University, Rutherford worked as a high school art teacher in Chelsea, Michigan for five years. Although she enjoyed the job, she returned to graduate school in 2019 in hopes of finding a teaching job that paid better. She attended the University of Wisconsin–Milwaukee, where she graduated with a Master of Fine Arts. Her graduate thesis show, which she exhibited in May 2021, focused on the Great Lakes.

In 2021, she worked as an adjunct lecturer at the University of Wisconsin-Milwaukee.

== Art ==
Rutherford is a printmaker and book artist.

Many of Rutherford's pieces are related to the environment and climate change. One of her inspirations is beach trash, which she collects for some of her prints and found object works. She particularly likes using glass tubes, which she fills with found objects.

In 2021 she had a solo exhibition, entitled Geo Rutherford: On the Threshold of the Great Lakes at Rahr West Art Museum in Manitowoc, Wisconsin. The following year, she was included in the exhibition Approaching Water at Constellation Studios in Lincoln, Nebraska.

== Online presence ==
Rutherford began posting on TikTok after the onset of the COVID-19 pandemic. She began posting about her art and about the Great Lakes, which would become a frequent subject. Her first video on the Great Lakes, and second video ever, was posted in August 2020 and received 4 million views. More largely, Rutherford's TikToks tend to focus on hydrology.

As of October 2023, Rutherford had 1.6 million followers on TikTok.

Rutherford has an annual series, Spooky Lake Month, which takes place in October. During the month, Rutherford posts a new video on a "haunted hydrology" story each day. Rutherford has said she tries to avoid topics like true crime, conspiracies, or the supernatural in her content, and to instead focus on centering the environment and the power of nature.

== Book ==
Following the success of Spooky Lake Month 2021, several literary agents reached out to Rutherford, with interest in her publishing a book on hydrology. In 2022, Rutherford signed a book deal for Spooky Lakes, a middle-school non-fiction book which she wrote and illustrated herself. The book released in September 2024 through Abrams.
