= Josaiah Ndubuisi Wachuku =

Nigerian monarch

Josaiah Ndubuisi Wachuku (also spelled Josiah Wachukwu; died 1950) was king, paramount chief, servant leader and Eze of Ngwa-land – in the then Aba Division of Eastern Nigeria – during British colonial times.

He was the father of Jaja Wachuku, the first Nigerian speaker of the House of Representatives of Nigeria, the first Nigerian ambassador and permanent representative to the United Nations, and first Nigerian minister of foreign affairs.
