= Servant leadership =

Leadership philosophy

Servant leadership is a leadership philosophy in which the goal of the leader is to serve. A servant leader shares power, puts the needs of the employees first and helps people develop and perform as highly as possible. Instead of the people working to serve the leader, the leader exists to serve the people. As stated by its founder, Robert K. Greenleaf, a servant leader should be focused on "Do those served grow as persons? Do they, while being served, become healthier, wiser, freer, more autonomous, more likely themselves to become servants?"

When leaders shift their mindset and serve first, they benefit as well as their employees in that their employees acquire personal growth, while the organization grows as well due to the employees' growing commitment and engagement. Since this leadership style came about, a number of different organizations including Starbucks and Marriott International have adopted this style as their way of leadership.

According to a 2002 study by Sen Sendjaya and James C. Sarros, servant leadership is being practiced in some of the top-ranking companies, and these companies are highly ranked because of their leadership style and following. Further research also confirms that servant leaders lead others to go beyond the call of duty.

== History ==
Before the modern popularity of the concept of "leadership", the autocratic enlightened absolutist King Frederick II ("the Great") of Prussia (r. 1740–1786) famously portrayed himself as "the first servant of the state".

The roots of the concept can be seen in much earlier texts. For instance, the Bible contains the following teaching of Jesus Christ:

And Jesus called them to him and said to them, "You know that those who are considered rulers of the Gentiles lord it over them, and their great ones exercise authority over them. But it shall not be so among you. But whoever would be great among you must be your servant, and whoever would be first among you must be slave of all. For even the Son of Man came not to be served but to serve, and to give his life as a ransom for many."

— Mark 10:42–45 ESV

Robert K. Greenleaf first popularized the phrase servant leadership in "The Servant as Leader", an essay published in 1970. In this essay, Greenleaf explains how and why he came up with the idea of servant leadership, as well as defining a servant leader. Larry Spears, CEO of the Greenleaf Center for Servant Leadership, stated in an interview:

"Greenleaf credited his reading of Hesse's 1932 book, Journey to the East, as the personal source of inspiration in his coining the term, 'servant-leader' in his 1970 essay, The Servant as Leader."

In Journey to the East, the main character, named Leo, is a servant just like all the others. All the servants work well together, until one day when Leo disappears. When the servants realize that things are not the same without Leo, they came to the realization that Leo was far more than a servant – he was actually their leader.

Greenleaf came to the realization that a newfound leader should be someone that servants or workers can relate to. Leo was seen as a servant, but when the other servants realized that things fell apart without him, he became far more than just a servant to them. This is Greenleaf's idea of what a servant leader should be. Greenleaf first put his idea of servant leadership to use in an organizational sense while he was working as an executive at AT&T.

Servant leadership entered the arena of research in 1998 with the publication of the first peer-reviewed servant leadership scale, and since then, over 270 peer-reviewed articles have been published across 122 academic journals. The year 2008 was a significant year in servant leadership research with the publication of two seminal papers by Sen Sendjaya, James C. Sarros, and Joseph C. Santora as well as Liden, Wayne, Zhao, and Henderson, and the first publications using Ehrhart's (2004) measure.

== Greenleaf's original formulation ==
The most important characteristic in being a servant leader, according to Greenleaf, is making one's main priority to serve rather than to lead. According to Ginny Boyum, Greenleaf proposed that servant leaders should serve first, make the needs of others their main priority, and find success and "power" in the growth of others; summarily, "A servant can only become a leader if a leader remains a servant". In simpler terms, servant leaders should seek to be servants first, to care for the needs of all others around them, to ensure growth of future leaders. These traits indicate one is a servant leader because, overall, they are causing the ones they serve to become healthier and wiser, guiding others toward self-improvement. Eventually, the served are driven to possess the traits of a servant leader as well, continuing the spread of the leadership style.

Greenleaf believed the betterment of others to be the true intention of a servant leader: "I serve" in opposition of the traditional "I lead" mentality. The "I serve" mentality is evident in politicians who define their role through public service. From the "I serve" mentality come two premises:

- I serve because I am the leader, and
- I am the leader because I serve

The first premise signifies the act of altruism. Altruism is defined as the belief in or practice of disinterested and selfless concern for the well-being of others. Greenleaf declares that servant leadership begins with the natural feeling of wanting to serve first. The act of leadership is in the context of serving others and to serve others. Only through the act of serving does the leader lead other people to be what they are capable of. The second premise of servant leadership ("I am the leader because I serve") begins with a rooted ambition to be a leader or personal ambitions of a leader.

Greenleaf's definition left much room for speculation because it lacks specifics. Servant leadership is handled throughout the literature by many different dimensions. Servant leadership represents a model of leadership that is both inspirational and contains moral safeguards, and in their paper, Mulyadi Robin and Sen Sendjaya proposes that servant leadership serves as a holistic paradigm for leadership as not only is it transformative and ethical, but also engages followers in workplace spirituality.

Despite several conceptual papers on the topic of servant leadership, there is no consensus on empirical research for the servant-leadership construct until a state-of-the-art review published in 2020 by Nathan Eva, Mulyadi Robin, Sen Sendjaya, Dirk van Dierendonck, and Robert C Liden in the Leadership Quarterly.

== Formulations after Greenleaf ==
=== Scales and servant leadership extensions ===
Numerous different researchers and leadership experts have created scales and dimensions to differentiate between the levels of Servant Leadership practices as well as evaluate Servant Leadership behaviors.

- One major extension was Larry Spears's 10 characteristics of the servant leader. Similar to other leadership experts, Spears believed that servant leaders should have these 10 traits: empathy, listening, healing, awareness, persuasion, conceptualization, foresight, stewardship, commitment to the growth of people, and building community. Leadership experts such as Bolman, Deal, Covey, Fullan, Sergiovanni, and Heifitz also reference these characteristics as essential components of effective leadership.
- Likewise, Joe Iarocci, author of Servant Leadership in the Workplace, identifies three key priorities (developing people, building a trusting team, achieving results), three key principles (serve first, persuasion, empowerment) and three key practices (listening, delegating, connecting followers to mission) that distinguish servant leadership in the workplace context.
- Researchers Barbuto and Wheeler created a dimension called "the natural desire to serve others", by combining the 10 characteristics of Spears. These researchers developed operational definitions and scales to measure 11 potential characteristics of servant leadership. Factor analyses reduced this scale to five unique dimensions: altruistic calling (four items), emotional healing (four items), wisdom (five items), persuasive mapping (five items), and organizational stewardship (five items). This framework specified the fundamentals to servant leadership and was consistent with Greenleaf's original message. Among these five dimensions, altruistic calling is most aligned with ethics.
- There are also researchers such as Russell and Stone who reviewed the literature and proposed nine 'functional' attributes of servant leadership (vision, honesty, integrity, trust, service, modeling, pioneering, appreciation of others, and empowerment) and eleven 'accompanying' attributes (communication, credibility, competence, stewardship, visibility, influence, persuasion, listening, encouragement, teaching, and delegation). They also argued that the servant leader must be a teacher to develop their followers, and that values and core personal beliefs were the antecedents to servant leadership.
- Researcher Patterson also developed a more spiritual conceptualization of servant leadership around leader values including: agapé love, humility, altruism, creating 21 visions for followers, being trusting, serving, and empowering their followers. This work was exploratory in nature. No confirmatory analysis was performed, no criterion was posited to establish validity, and convergent/divergent validity was not established.
- Sendjaya, Eva, Butar-Butar, Robin and Castles' (2019) six-item composite of the Servant Leadership Behavior Scale (SLBS-6) which uniquely contributes a spiritual dimension, a distinguishing feature that makes servant leadership a truly holistic leadership approach relative to other positive leadership approaches. The inclusion of spirituality faithfully reflects Greenleaf's (1977) initial, and Graham's (1991) theorizing, that servant leadership relies on spiritual insights and humility as its source of influence.

=== Thoughts on servant leadership and further definitions ===
In addition to some early definitions and distinct characteristics of servant leaders, researchers and leadership experts have used research to add on to these. James Sipe and Don Frick, in their book The Seven Pillars of Servant Leadership, state that servant-leaders are individuals of character, those who put people first, are skilled communicators, are compassionate collaborators, use foresight, are systems thinkers, and exercise moral authority. Similarly, researcher Akuchie explored the religious and spiritual articulations of the servant leadership construct. Akuchie examined a single Bible passage related to servant leadership and suggested that the application of this lesson is for daily life. However, Akuchie did not, in any way, clarify servant leadership as distinct from other forms of leadership or articulate a framework for understanding servant leadership.

In their review of the servant leadership literature, Eva, Robin, Sendjaya, van Dierendonk and Liden argued that for research, servant leadership should be defined as "an (1) other-oriented approach to leadership (2) manifested through one-on-one prioritizing of follower individual needs and interests, (3) and outward reorienting of their concern for self towards concern for others within the organization and the larger community."

The authors proposed three key elements that captures the essence of servant leadership and set it apart from other leadership styles – namely the motive (the underlying personal motivation for taking up a leadership responsibility, requiring a strong sense of self, character, and psychological maturity), the mode (that they lead by prioritizing subordinates' needs above the organization's bottom line), and the mindset (that servant leaders are stewards who reorient their followers' focus towards others). In essence, servant leadership comprises the following: (1) someone or something other than the leader, (2) one-on-one interactions between leaders and followers, and (3) an overarching concern towards the wellbeing of the wider organizational stakeholders and the larger community.

The appeal or, or preference to engage in, servant leadership may be influenced by leaders' personalities. The altruistic-nurturing personality type, as measured by the Strength Deployment Inventory show a strong positive correlation with servant leadership at 0.708. While leaders with different types showed correlations with other leadership styles. The assertive-directing type correlated with transformational leadership, analytic-autonomizing leaders correlated with transactional leadership, and those with a flexible-cohering type correlated with situational leadership.

== Critiques of servant leadership ==
=== Critiques of Greenleaf ===
Various critiques of servant leadership have been made. In one such critique, Sendjaya and Sarros used the same Bible account as Akuchie, and made the claim that Jesus Christ, not Greenleaf, introduced the notion of servant leadership to everyday human endeavor. They argued that this leadership principle was so important to Christianity that it was captured by all four authors of the Canonical Gospels. The researchers argued that servant leaders have a particular view of themselves as stewards who are entrusted to develop and empower followers to reach their fullest potential. However, Sendjaya and Sarros' research work did not propose a testable framework nor did this work distinguish between this and other leadership styles.

Feminist scholars have noted that servant leadership is based on patriarchal approaches to leadership, noting that leadership discourse in general is attributed with masculinity. Similarly, Black scholars have pointed out how notions of servants as being subjugated and mistreated is largely absent from servant leadership discourse. Black scholars also note that although Greenleaf attributes his ideas to Hermann Hesse, Martin Luther King Jr. preached similar approaches and was a contemporary of Greenleaf in the United States, but King is never mentioned in any of Greenleaf's original works.

=== Critiques of the approach ===
Researchers Farling, Stone, and Winston noted the lack of empirical evidence for servant leadership. The researchers presented servant leadership as a hierarchical model in a cyclical process. This consisted of behavioral (vision, service) and relational (influence, credibility, trust) components. However, this conceptualization made by these researchers did not differ from leadership theories such as transformational leadership. Researcher Polleys distinguished servant leadership from three predominant leadership paradigms: The Trait, Behavioral, and Contingency approaches to leadership. Polleys's views aligned with transforming leadership but, once again, made no distinctions among charismatic, transformational, and servant leadership.

Risks and limitations of servant leadership with regard to ethical questions

In the leadership literature, servant leadership is often presented as a particularly ethical leadership style. A 2021 paper published in the Journal of Management History explained why servant leadership poses a number of risks and limitations, particularly with regard to ethical issues and dilemmas. The researchers identified four main risks:

1. The risk that the servant leader may have too narrow an understanding of "service".
2. Servant leadership's ambiguity about morality/the moral content.
3. The fact that servant leadership "relies on the moral framework" of the followers.
4. The risk that servant leadership without the leader's motivation to serve will remain "up in the air", i.e., "detached from a clearly defined moral compass".

== Experimental research and theory ==
=== Theoretical foundations ===
Servant leadership predominately draws on two social theories to explain how it influences follower behavior: social learning and social exchange theory. In servant leadership literature, the use of social learning theory argues that servant leaders are influencing their followers, as their followers observe and emulate the leader's positive behaviors. In contrast, social exchange theory is used to argue that a servant leader's followers are exhibiting positive behaviors due to the reciprocal relationship they develop with their leader.

=== Employee organization commitment ===
While organizations thrive based on the work produced by the employees, the commitment of the employees to the organization is a major contributor to how well an organization functions. Research shows that management style is a main factor in sales person turnover. When put into practice, servant leadership has a positive effect on a salesperson's turnover intentions because turnover is mainly associated with "the quality of the salesperson–supervisor relationship." Due to servant leaders making their employees their main priority and placing their well-being above everything else, including the organization, the employees feel a sense of trust and a need to return the commitment and obligation that their employer has for them to the organization. Likewise, servant leadership has a direct effect on employer brand perception, which in turn reduces employee job turnover. According to Kashyap and Rangnekar, servant leadership molds organizations and builds a positive image for the organization. This leads to turnover intention reduction in that the employees "... take pride in what they do and enjoy the company of people they work with". Servant leaders are also seen as good role models in the eyes of their employees. Because of this, employees begin to act as servant leaders themselves, and portray great commitment to the organizations where they see these behaviors and how they affect others around them. The employees also stay at the organization so that they can see and learn more from their employer.

=== Employee life ===
Servant leadership practices appear to have an effect on the life of the employee, outside of the organizations that they are affiliated with. It has been concluded that employee perceptions of servant leadership practices and the support of employers and co-workers has a positive effect on an employee's family life. Having their employer cater to their needs, in conjunction with supportive co-workers and staff, aids in lowering stress levels, which produces the desire to go home and cater to their family's needs. In addition, servant leadership being the foundation of organizations is said to lead to employees having positive experiences and satisfaction in the work place, which in turn leads to "a transfer of positive experiences from the work role to the family role". Servant leadership being practiced is said to decrease emotional exhaustion, which is the leading cause of employee burnout. Servant leadership lessens the feeling of being "drained of inner resources", so employees experience an increase in work-to-family positive spillover (WFPS). This decreased emotional exhaustion also leads to stronger marital relationships. Moreover, employees feeling that their needs are made a priority in the workplace, as well as the feeling of being satisfied with their interactions at work on a daily basis, has an impact on their family's experience with them as they shift from the work role to the family role.

=== Job performance ===
Servant leadership also contributes to employees' goal achievement and success. As defined before, a servant leader's goal is to build upon the skills of their employees and make them better people. With this trait, studies have shown that servant leaders have the ability to influence their employees to achieve their own goals as well as their work goals due to their leaders empowerment, and this plays a major role in their continued success and growth. This outcome is expected because the servant leader's main concern is the well-being of their employees. Likewise, servant leaders managing the work environment and things such as "rewards, deadlines, work allocation and performance evaluations" has a positive effect on the well-being and satisfaction of employees because the practices of a servant leader deals with these aspects in a way that benefits the employees in every way possible. Studies have also shown that leadership as a whole has an effect on employees' psychological health. Studies have shown this in that the less strain on the employee and the more they assimilate at the organization, the better their psychological health. Research has shown that though many organizations believe that the "top-down" way, or the leader prioritizing themselves and the organization and then the employees, is the best way to engage employees in their work, servant leadership's "bottom-up" style, or prioritizing the needs of the employees first, causes employees to be more engaged in their work in that they feel that they have social support from their leader as well as their colleagues. Overall, employees feeling a sense of support, as well as having a leader who does everything in their power to do things that are beneficial for the employees, contributes to heightened employee job performance.

=== Community citizenship behavior ===
Similar to servant leadership having an effect on employees' stress levels, it also affects them emotionally as well. According to previous research, servant leadership seems to have an effect on the emotional health of the employees because the servant leaders' reliance on "one-on-one communication to understand the abilities, needs, desires, goals, and potential of those individuals" aids in the employees' ability to express themselves in the workplace. In turn, this nurturing leads to them returning the same nurturing towards their co-workers and making the workplace a suitable environment for employee growth, as well as the production of good quality work to grow the organization. Organizations that do not practice servant leadership may discourage employees expressing their feelings in the workplace; however, servant leaders encourage this expression in order to prevent conflict. Servant leaders also make a safe emotional work environment for employees by making acceptance a major goal. Acceptance refers to having different personalities, personal views, and values as employees, and understanding that employees are not perfect. They also create a psychologically ethical climate. By doing this, servant leaders create a safe space where employees are able to be themselves and express their feelings, knowing that they can trust their leader to be non-judgmental. Lastly, servant leaders are able to manage employees' behaviors by being forgiving. Some employees may have personalities and/or characteristics that may lead to them doing or saying things to their leader that are unacceptable. However, servant leaders' being forgiving, and more importantly understanding, leads to employees being able to learn from their mistakes, hence their personal growth and changed behavior within the organization.

== Implications ==
Some argue that servant leadership is still going through the process of being accepted as a leadership theory because of Greenleaf's belief that servant leadership is a way of life rather than a systematized technique with a specific outline. Although servant leadership was proposed many years ago, it is still considered a "newer" theory among many other theories because of the switch in focus from the traditional leadership theories.

However, as demonstrated by Eva, Robin, Sendjaya, van Dierendonck, and Liden's review, research has established servant leadership as a valid construct that is worthwhile researching and implementing. The authors state:

The review has demonstrated that the servant leadership field has made progress in the last 20 years, however, the field of servant leadership still has its critics. Namely, as there are still lingering questions the conceptual and empirical overlap between servant leadership and transformational, ethical and authentic leadership and there are criticisms about how much the existing research in this field can tell us as it is restricted by its own limitations in research design. Our view is that it would be premature to hit the restart button on the field. Many of the problems have arisen from poor construct clarity, poor measurement, and poor design. We hope by heeding the advice offered in this review to resolve these problems, the servant leadership research can move forward and continue to offer significant insights to the leadership field over the next 20 years.

== See also ==
- Authentic leadership
- John Adair (author)
- Servant of the servants of God, title of the Roman Catholic Pope
- Son of man came to serve, a passage in the New Testament where Jesus describes servant leadership
- Three Levels of Leadership model
