= LGBTQ history in Michigan =

== 1700s ==
From 1660 to 1763, Michigan was part of the Royal Province of New France, which included France's laws making sodomy a capital offense. In 1763, Michigan was transferred to Great Britain's Indian Reserve and adopted British buggery statute that mandated a sentence of death for male-male buggery. The Quebec Act of 1774 incorporated Michigan into the Province of Quebec. When Quebec split into Lower and Upper Canada in 1791, Michigan was part of Kent County, Upper Canada. In 1796, under terms negotiated in the 1794 Jay Treaty, Britain withdrew from Michigan and it was adopted into the Northwest Territory. The Northwest Territory had adopted a statute in 1795 that received all of the common law of England as well as all English statutes adopted prior to the English settlement of North America in 1607. This included the English buggery statute that mandated a sentence of death for male-male buggery.

== 1800s ==
In 1800, Michigan became part of the Indiana Territory. None of the original laws of the Territory is known to exist today. In 1805, most of Michigan became a separate territory and enacted its own criminal code. It made no reference to sodomy. In 1809, a part of Michigan became part of the Illinois Territory, which adopted a statute of all laws of the Indiana Territory. This included penalty of up to five years in prison, a fine of $100–$500, and up to 500 lashes for sodomy. In 1810, the Michigan Territory decided to go its own way with law, enacting a statute that abrogated all laws of Great Britain, Canada, French, the Northwest Territory, the Indiana Territory, and all laws enacted by itself between specified dates in 1807 and 1810. It is unclear from the missing Code of 1800 if this law or a similar one had been in force in Michigan, but, if so, it was repealed as of this date.

The first official prohibition of sodomy occurred in 1816, when a new criminal code weighed sodomy as being of lesser heinous effect than murder, manslaughter, and treason and ahead of rape. The penalty was decreed as an unspecified fine and solitary imprisonment at hard labor for up to 21 years. In 1818, all of Michigan was incorporated into the Michigan Territory. In 1820, added a new code which specified the fine for sodomy at a maximum of $300 and reduced the maximum penalty to three years, still at solitary hard labor. In 1846, a new code of laws adopted the penalty for sodomy was raised to a maximum of 15 years, and the provision for a fine was eliminated. The legislature did not retain the language about the crime being complete upon penetration only.

In 1892, the first sodomy trial to go to the Michigan Supreme Court was People v. Graney, which upheld a sodomy conviction on appeal. Later in 1892, the Michigan Supreme Court decided People v. Hodgkin, where the court decided that the failure of the legislature to retain the language about penetration completing an act of sodomy in the 1846 code meant that proof of emission had to be established in order to convict. In 1897, Michigan enacted a unique ancillary law that prohibited the debauching of boys, which had two separate sections dealt with female and male violators.

== 1900–1970 ==
In 1903, a "gross indecency" law was enacted by the Michigan Legislature, further criminalizing non-heterosexual activity. In 1922, the Michigan Supreme Court upheld the gross indecency law in the case of People v. Carey. In 1923, the sodomy law was amended to eliminate the need to prove emission of semen to prove the crime. In 1931, the crimes against nature sodomy law was amended to add that even the slightest penetration was sufficient to complete the crime. The gross indecency law was changed to lower the maximum fine from $5,000 to $2,500.

In 1935, Michigan became the first state in the nation to enact a "psychopathic offender" law. The law established a procedure to refer those convicted of "indecent crimes" to state hospitals if certain criteria were met. The indecent crimes included not only sodomy and gross indecency, but also "indecent language in the presence or hearing of any woman or child," "any disorderly conduct involving sex," or "any other crime or offense of like nature." In 1936, the Michigan Supreme Court, in the case of People v. Schmitt, ruled that the term "crime against nature" did not embrace fellatio and that the latter crime could be prosecuted only under the "gross indecency" law, which provided a maximum penalty of five years in prison, versus the 15 years for the sodomy law.

In 1938, the Michigan Supreme Court, in a 5-3 vote, found in the case of People v. Frontczak, that the psychopathic offender law was unconstitutional. In 1939, the "gross indecency" law was expanded to cover two females and a male and a female and the psychopathic offender law was rewritten to get around the objections of the court. The specific reference to sodomy and gross indecency and all references to sex degenerates and sex perverts disappeared from the law and were replaced by those "with criminal propensities to the commission of sex offenses." The 1960s saw a continuation of the firing and ostracism of homosexual residents in Michigan as an aftereffect of McCarthyism. In 1965, Michigan enacted a law permitting any person convicted of most crimes, including sodomy and gross indecency, prior to turning 21 years old to have judgement of conviction set aside if requested five years or more after conviction and if the person had been convicted on not more than one offense. A judge was permitted to enter such an order if "the circumstances and behavior of the applicant" warranted it. In 1967, the Michigan Court of Appeals, deciding the case of People v. Askar, ruled that the sodomy law applied to heterosexuals. The constitutionality of the sodomy law was upheld by the Court of Appeals in 1968 in People v. Green. Also in 1968, the psychopathic offender law was repealing it outright.

== 1970–1979 ==
=== Organized activism ===
January 15, 1970, is regarded as the beginning of organized LGBT rights activism in Michigan. Following the Stonewall riots six months before, a "Gay Meeting" was advertised to be held at the St. Joseph's Episcopal Church in Detroit, a church which was known to be sociopolitically liberal in its orientation. The meeting attracted people from as far as Ann Arbor, and led to the foundation of the Detroit Gay Liberation Movement, of which then-organist of St. Joseph's Jim Toy was a founding member. Toy also helped start an Ann Arbor chapter in March of that year, and came out as gay at an anti-Vietnam War rally in April. Gayle Rubin, also a resident of Ann Arbor at the time, helped establish a group for lesbians in the local area.

On March 17, 1970, the University of Michigan chapter of the Gay Liberation Front was established by Jim Toy. In September 1971, Toy, a graduate of the University of Michigan, co-founded with Cynthia Gair the Human Sexuality Office (HSO) (later Lesbian-Gay Male Programs Office (LGMPO) and currently the Spectrum Center) at the University of Michigan in Ann Arbor, which was one of the first LGBT student centers ever established in the United States. He was appointed to the Diocesan Commission on Homosexuality in 1971 by Bishop Richard Emrich of the Episcopal Diocese of Michigan; the group published the Report & Recommendations of the Commission on Homosexuality (1973), one of the earliest church documents in this country to support the concerns of lesbian and gay people. The 1976 case of People v. Howell left a legal puzzle. Two of the eight members of the Michigan Supreme Court did not sit. The remaining six split 3-3 on the question of the constitutionality of the gross indecency law as applied to private, consensual activity between males, although the opinion of the court reads as though the decision went in favor of the striking of the law.

=== Local level anti-discrimination ordinances (1972–present) ===
Map of cities and counties that have sexual orientation and/or gender identity anti–employment discrimination ordinances Sexual orientation and gender identity with anti–employment discrimination ordinance Sexual orientation with anti–employment discrimination ordinance and gender identity solely in public employment Sexual orientation and gender identity solely in public employment^{1}^{1}Ingham, Washtenaw, and Wayne counties also prohibit discrimination on the basis of sexual orientation or gender identity in government employment.

The East Lansing chapter of the Gay Liberation Movement (now the Alliance of Queer and Ally Students) was formed on the campus of Michigan State University. It protested continued firings of openly gay city workers and successfully pressured the East Lansing City Council to pass the first-ever anti-discrimination ordinance inclusive of sexual orientation in U.S. history on March 7, 1972.

The April 1972 election of Jerry DeGrieck and Nancy Wechsler to the Ann Arbor city council on the Human Rights Party ticket would signal changes for LGBT rights in the state. The first-ever "Lesbian-Gay Pride Week Proclamation" by any government body in the country was issued by the city council in June. The groundbreaking Ann Arbor anti-discrimination ordinance passed by the council following the election was amended by December 1972 to include sexual orientation, making Ann Arbor the second city in the state to pass an LGBT-inclusive anti-discrimination ordinance. Both the proclamation and amendment were co-authored by Jim Toy.

Both Wechsler and DeGrieck came out as homosexual during their terms on city council, thus becoming the first openly homosexual public-office holders in the United States. When Wechsler declined to run for reelection in 1974, her seat was won by HRP candidate Kathy Kozachenko, who became the country's first openly gay or lesbian candidate to win public office.

Municipality	Sexual orientation	Gender identity	Employment protections	Housing protections	Date
Adrian	Yes	Yes	Yes	Yes	April 21, 2014
Albion	Yes	Yes	Yes	Yes	2015
Ann Arbor	Yes (Note: While East Lansing was the first community in the United States to enact civil rights protections that included sexual orientation, Ann Arbor was the first to pass comprehensive protections that included employment, housing, and public accommodations.)	Yes (1999)	Yes	Yes	July 1972
Battle Creek	Yes	Yes	Yes	Yes	September 3, 2013
Bay City	Yes	Yes	Yes	Yes	2016
Birmingham	Yes	No	No	Yes	1992
Buchanan	Yes	Yes	Yes	Yes	June 10, 2019
Cadillac	Yes	Yes	Yes	Yes	September 17, 2018
Canton Township	Yes	Yes	Yes	Yes	June 11, 2014
Chelsea	Yes	Yes	Yes	Yes	2016
Dearborn Heights	Yes	Yes	Yes	Yes	2006
Delhi Township	Yes	Yes	Yes	Yes	October 1, 2013
Delta Township	Yes	Yes	Yes	Yes	October 21, 2013
Detroit	Yes	Yes (2008)	Yes	Yes	1979
Douglas	Yes	Yes	Yes	Yes	1995
East Grand Rapids	Yes	Yes	Yes	Yes	March 26, 2015
East Lansing	Yes (Note: East Lansing was the first community in the United States to enact civil rights protections that included sexual orientation.)	Yes (2005)	Yes	Yes (1986)	March 7, 1972
Farmington Hills	Yes	Yes	Yes	Yes	2014
Fenton	Yes	Yes	Yes	Yes	June 9, 2014
Ferndale	Yes (Note: Ferndale voters passed the measure in 2006 after three voter referendums since the time it was first proposed in 1991.)	Yes	Yes	Yes	2006
Flint	Yes	No (Note: An ordinance expanding its non-discrimination ordinance was passed in 2012. However, when the Emergency Financial Manager (EFM) law was voted down statewide, all ordinances enacted in Flint by the EMF were removed, including the non-discrimination ordinance. Their previous non-discrimination ordinance is still in effect, but the gender identity component is not.)	No	Yes	1990
Grand Ledge	Yes	No	Yes	Yes	2000
Grand Rapids	Yes	Yes	Yes	Yes	1994
Holland	Yes	Yes	Yes	Yes	August 19, 2020
Howell	Yes	Yes	Yes	Yes	2016
Huntington Woods	Yes (Note: In 2001, the City Council approved the measure, but opponents gathered enough signatures to force a citywide ballot question on the ordinance. In November 2001, voters then approved the measure, 1,982 to 896.)	Yes	Yes	Yes	2001
Jackson	Yes	Yes	Yes	Yes	2017
Kalamazoo	Yes (Note: The ordinance was first passed in December 2008. It was repealed in January 2009 when opponents submitted petitions to force a public vote. The city drafted language that offered a compromise, including the exemption for religious organizations. The City Council voted unanimously in June 2009 to pass it. Groups opposed to including sexual orientation and gender identity in the ordinance again submitted petitions — 1,273 signatures were needed, 2,088 were gathered. On November 4, 2009, the ordinance was upheld with 7,671 people voting “yes” and 4,731 voting “no” — 60% to 37%.)	Yes	Yes	Yes	2009
Kalamazoo Township	Yes	Yes	Yes	Yes	July 22, 2013
Lake Orion	Yes	Yes	Yes	Yes	2016
Lansing	Yes	Yes	Yes	Yes	2006
Lathrup Village	Yes	Yes	Yes	Yes	February 24, 2014
Linden	Yes	Yes	Yes	Yes	September 12, 2013
Marquette	Yes	Yes	Yes	Yes	December 14, 2015
Meridian Township	Yes	Yes	No	Yes	July 10, 2013
Mount Pleasant	Yes	Yes	Yes	Yes	July 9, 2012
Muskegon	Yes	Yes	Yes	Yes	March 12, 2012
Oshtemo Township	Yes	Yes	Yes	Yes	August 27, 2013
Pleasant Ridge	Yes (Note: On March 4, 2013 the Pleasant Ridge City Commission passed a human rights ordinance in a 6–1 vote which included sexual orientation. On April 9, 2013, the Commission voted unanimously to also prohibits biases based on HIV status and gender identity.)	Yes	Yes	Yes	March 4, 2013
Portage	Yes	Yes	Yes	Yes	2016
Royal Oak	Yes (Note: In March 2013, the Royal Oak City Commission voted 6-1 to enact a human rights ordinance inclusive of gender identity and sexual orientation. Opponents collected more than 1,000 petition signatures to override the commission’s vote and put the issue before Royal Oak voters in the November 2013 election. Royal Oak voters rejected a similar human rights ordinance in 2001 by a 2-1 margin, but passed the ordinance in 2013 by a margin of 6,654 votes for and 5,670 votes against the measure.)	Yes	Yes	Yes	November 5, 2013
Saginaw	Yes	No	No	Yes	1984
Saint Joseph	Yes	Yes	Yes	Yes	March 11, 2019
Saline	Yes	Yes	Yes	Yes	March 5, 2018
Saugatuck	Yes	Yes	Yes	Yes	2007
Saugatuck Township	Yes	Yes	Yes	Yes	2007
Southfield	Yes	Yes	Yes	Yes	2015
Traverse City	Yes (Note: On October 4, 2011, the Traverse City Commission approved the measure to prevent discrimination based on sexual orientation or gender identity. Opponents of the law collected signatures to require a referendum. On November 8, 2011, Traverse City residents voted 63% to 37% in favor of retaining the city ordinance.)	Yes	Yes	Yes	October 4, 2010
Trenton	Yes	Yes	Yes	Yes	November 12, 2013
Union Township	Yes	Yes	Yes	Yes	October 11, 2012
Wayland	Yes	Yes	Yes	Yes	2015
Ypsilanti	Yes	Yes	Yes	Yes	1997

== 1980–1989 ==
In 1983, House Bill 5000 was introduced, the first to seek adding "sexual orientation" to the state's Elliott-Larsen Civil Rights Act, co-sponsored by Republican representative Jim Dressel, who later came out as gay. In 1987, in People v. Kalchik, the Court of Appeals upheld the constitutionality of the gross indecency law but still overturned the conviction. In another case from 1989, People v. Lynch, another Court of Appeals panel decided to follow Howell that consenting adults could not be prosecuted under the gross indecency law but allowed the conviction to stand because it occurred in a public restroom.

== 1990–1999 ==
Michigan's crime against nature and gross indecency laws was briefly overturned in Wayne County by Michigan Organization for Human Rights v. Kelley when MOHR won the case in Michigan's Wayne County Circuit Court on July 9, 1990. While the state did not appeal the ruling, the laws was upheld, in a 10-3 vote, by the Michigan Court of Appeals, in People v. Brashier on December 29, 1992, effectively reversing MOHR v. Kelly. In 1991, the Ann Arbor City Council unanimously enacts the first domestic partnership ordinance in the state. In 1994, the Michigan Supreme Court, by a 5-3 vote, ruled that the Court of Appeals erred in Brashier in deciding that "gross indecency" could be decided by triers of fact under a "common sense of the community." In June 1996, the Michigan House of Representatives voted 88-14 to ban same-sex marriage in the state, while the Michigan State Senate voted 31-2 in favor of the ban. Also in June, the Michigan House also approved, in a 74-28 vote, a bill banning recognition of out of state-same-sex marriages. The Michigan Senate also approved of this bill. Both bills where signed into law by Governor John Engler.

== 2000–2009 ==
In 2001, after the arrest of a Detroit state judge for exposing himself in a restroom, County Prosecutor Mike Duggan announced that "[w]e are not going to charge and prosecute consenting adults." In 2003, the U.S. Supreme Court decision Lawrence v. Texas invalidated all laws against consensual sodomy throughout the United States. However, the law has not been formally repealed by the Michigan Legislature as of present. On December 23, 2003, Governor Jennifer Granholm issues an executive order prohibited employment discrimination in public sector employment on the basis of sexual orientation.

In 2004, voters approved a constitutional amendment, Michigan State Proposal – 04-2, that banned same-sex marriage and civil unions in the state. It passed with 58.6% of the vote. The Michigan Supreme Court later ruled that public employers in Michigan would not be legally allowed to grant domestic partnership benefits based on the recently passed measure. On November 22, 2007, Governor Jennifer Granholm extended her executive order to include gender identity. This executive order would be extended under Governor Rick Snyder.

== 2010–present ==
On September 15, 2011, the Michigan House of Representatives, in a 64-44 vote, approved of a bill that would banned most public employers, though not colleges and universities, from offering health benefits to the domestic partners of their employees. It did not extend to workers whose benefits are established by the Michigan Civil Service Commission. On December 7, 2011, the Michigan State Senate, in a 27-9 vote, approved of the bill. On December 22, 2011, Governor Rick Snyder signed the bill into effect. On January 23, 2012, a lesbian couple filed a lawsuit known as DeBoer v. Snyder in federal district court, challenging the state's ban on adoption by same-sex couples so they can jointly adopt their children. In December 2012, the Michigan Court of Appeals ruled that the state's courts have jurisdiction to grant second parent adoptions by same-sex couples. The ruling stopped short of offering an interpretation of the code to allow for courts to grant such adoptions.

On March 14, 2013, the Michigan State Senate passed, by a 37-0 vote, an emergency harbor dredging funding bill that made private marinas ineligible for a new loan program if they discriminate based on sexual orientation. On March 20, 2013, the Michigan House of Representatives passed the bill by a vote of 106-4. On March 27, 2013, Governor Rick Snyder signed an emergency harbor dredging funding bill that made private marinas ineligible for a new loan program if they discriminate based on sexual orientation. On June 28, 2013, U.S. District Judge David M. Lawson issued a preliminary injunction blocking the state from enforcing its law banning local governments and school districts from offering health benefits to their employees' domestic partners.

The state of Michigan legalized same-sex marriage on March 21, 2014, when U.S. District Judge Bernard Friedman struck down the state's ban, finding it unconstitutional. Attorney General Bill Schuette filed for an emergency stay. In the interim, gay and lesbian couples began to apply for licenses and marry as early as the morning of Saturday, March 22, 2014, when the clerks' offices opened. That same day the appeals court imposed a stay in the case until March 26. In March 2023, the Governor of Michigan signed a bill into law that passed both houses of the Michigan Legislature in the same month - formally codifies both sexual orientation and gender identity into civil rights laws and preventing LGBT discrimination against individuals within Michigan.

== LGBT people from Michigan ==
- Forman Brown (born in Otsego), one of the world's leaders in puppet theatre in his day, as well as an important early gay novelist
- Cookie Buffet (born in Ann Arbor), drag queen, gay rights activist
- David Burtka (born in Dearborn), actor and chef
- Lynn Conway, computer scientist and trans activist
- James K. Dressel, state representative in the Michigan legislature in the late 1970s and early 1980s
- Ruth Ellis, activist and inspiration for Ruth Ellis Center
- Feloni, rapper
- Marilyn Frye, feminist theorist, teaches feminist philosophy, metaphysics, and philosophy of language at Michigan State University since 1974
- LZ Granderson (born in Detroit), journalist and commentator
- David M. Halperin, scholar
- Quentin Harris (born in Detroit), house music producer, remixer and DJ
- James Leo Herlihy (born in Detroit), novelist, playwright and actor.
- Holly Hughes, (born in Saginaw), performance artist
- Chris Kolb (born in Ann Arbor), former member of the Michigan State House of Representatives for the 53rd district
- Lisa Kron (born in Ann Arbor), actress, playwright.
- Kathy Kozachenko, won a seat on the Ann Arbor City Council in 1972, first openly gay or lesbian candidate to run successfully for political office in the United States
- Lawrence La Fountain-Stokes, author, scholar, and performer
- W. Dorr Legg, trained as a landscape architect at the University of Michigan at Ann Arbor, one of the founders of the United States gay rights movement
- Holly Miranda, singer-songwriter and musician
- Peter McWilliams (born in Allen Park), writer and self-publisher of best-selling self-help books
- Gary Miller, conductor, graduated from University of Michigan with a Master of Music in choral conducting
- Jeffrey Montgomery (born in Detroit), activist and co-founder of Triangle Foundation (now Equality Michigan)
- Steven Piziks, novelist
- Charles Pugh (born in Detroit), television journalist, radio personality and politician best known for his work at WJBK in Detroit from 1999 to 2009, elected council president of Detroit City Council in 2009
- Alma Routsong, poet
- Gayle Rubin, scholar
- Nate Silver (born East Lansing), statistician and writer who analyzes in-game baseball activity and elections
- Jon Stryker, architect, philanthropist and activist for social and environmental causes
- Jim Toy, co-author of the first official "Lesbian-Gay Pride Week Proclamation" in U.S. history (in Ann Arbor), founded the Spectrum Center at the University of Michigan

== See also ==
- LGBT rights in Michigan
