= Finizio =

Finizio is a surname. Notable people with the surname include:

- Daryl Justin Finizio (born 1977), American politician
- Gino Finizio (1941–2022), Italian designer and architect
