= List of first openly LGBTQ politicians in the United States =

This is a list of the first openly LGBTQ people to have held political office in the United States. No openly LGBTQ person has served as President, Vice President, Speaker of the House of Representatives, or as a justice on the Supreme Court. However, all 50 states have elected openly LGBTQ people to political office in some capacity, and 49 states have elected openly LGBTQ people to either or both chambers of their state legislature.

A total of five openly LGBTQ people have served in the Cabinet of the United States or in a cabinet-level office: Scott Bessent, Pete Buttigieg, Demetrios Marantis, Richard Grenell, and Vince Micone.

A total of ten states and one territory have elected a total of fourteen openly LGBTQ people to statewide or territorywide elected offices: Jared Polis, Maura Healey, Tina Kotek, Kate Brown, Tammy Baldwin, Kyrsten Sinema, Dana Nessel, Kris Mayes, Ricardo Lara, Kevin Lembo, Josh Tenorio, Benjamin Cruz, Sarah McBride, and John S. Arrowood.

A total of three of the eight most populous cities in the United States have elected a total of three openly LGBTQ people as mayor: Todd Gloria, Lori Lightfoot, and Annise Parker.

== Federal ==
=== Executive ===
In addition to the politicians listed below, Jenny Durkan, who served as United States attorney for the Western District of Washington from 2009 to 2014, is believed to be the first openly gay United States attorney. Furthermore, in 2013, Demetrios Marantis became the first openly LGBTQ person to serve in a cabinet-level position in the Cabinet of the United States, serving in the Cabinet of Barack Obama as the acting United States trade representative following the departure of Ron Kirk.

| Image | Name | Party | Entered office of first | Departed office of first | Office of first | Notes | President(s) |
|---|---|---|---|---|---|---|---|
| Portrait of Roberta Achtenberg | Roberta Achtenberg | Democratic | 1993 | 1995 | Assistant Secretary of Housing and Urban Development for Fair Housing and Equal Opportunity | Achtenberg is the first openly LGBTQ person appointed to a federal position requiring confirmation by the United States Senate. She later became a commissioner for the United States Commission on Civil Rights in 2011. | Bill Clinton (1993–2001) |
| Portrait of James C. Hormel | James C. Hormel | Democratic | September 8, 1999 | January 1, 2001 | United States ambassador to Luxembourg | Hormel was the first openly gay man to represent the United States as an ambassador. | Bill Clinton (1993–2001) |
| Portrait of John Berry | John Berry | Democratic | April 13, 2009 | April 13, 2013 | Director of the Office of Personnel Management | Berry is the first openly gay head of a federal agency. | Barack Obama (2009–2017) |
| Portrait of Sharon Lubinski | Sharon Lubinski | Democratic | January 2010 | December 2016 | United States marshal for the District of Minnesota | Lubinski was the first openly gay United States marshal. | Barack Obama (2009–2017) |
| Portrait of Chai Feldblum | Chai Feldblum | Democratic | March 27, 2010 | July 1, 2018 | Commissioner of the Equal Employment Opportunity Commission | Feldblum is the first openly LGBTQ commissioner of the Equal Employment Opportunity Commission. | Barack Obama (2009–2017) |
| Portrait of Eric Fanning | Eric Fanning | Democratic | May 18, 2016 | January 20, 2017 | Secretary of the Army | Fanning is the first openly gay leader of a U.S. military service. | Barack Obama (2009–2017) |
| Portrait of Pete Buttigieg | Pete Buttigieg | Democratic | February 3, 2021 | January 20, 2025 | Secretary of Transportation | Buttigieg is the first openly LGBTQ Cabinet member confirmed by the U.S. Senate. Buttigieg was the first openly gay person in the presidential line of succession, ranking 14th. | Joe Biden (2021–2025) |
| Portrait of Rachel Levine | Rachel Levine | Democratic | March 26, 2021 | January 20, 2025 | Assistant Secretary for Health | Levine is the first openly transgender official to be confirmed by the U.S. Senate. | Joe Biden (2021–2025) |
| Portrait of Scott Bessent | Scott Bessent | Republican | January 28, 2025 | Incumbent | Secretary of the Treasury | Bessent is the first openly gay treasury secretary and is also the highest-ranking openly LGBTQ person in the presidential line of succession, ranking 5th. | Donald Trump (2025–present) |

=== Legislative ===
==== House of Representatives ====
| Image | Name | Party | Start of first congressional term | End of last congressional term | Congressional district | Notes |
|---|---|---|---|---|---|---|
| | Gerry Studds | Democratic | Jan 3, 1973 | Jan 3, 1997 | MA-12 (until 1983) | Studds came out as gay as a result of his implication in the 1983 congressional page sex scandal. He became the first openly LGBTQ person to win election to Congress with his reelection in 1984. |
| | Gerry Studds | Democratic | Jan 3, 1973 | Jan 3, 1997 | MA-10 (until 1997) | Studds came out as gay as a result of his implication in the 1983 congressional page sex scandal. He became the first openly LGBTQ person to win election to Congress with his reelection in 1984. |
| Portrait of Tammy Baldwin | Tammy Baldwin | Democratic | January 3, 1999 | January 3, 2013 (Note: Baldwin went on to become a United States senator on this date.) | WI-2 | Baldwin is the first openly LGBTQ member of Congress to have come out at the time of her first election into the legislative branch. |
| Portrait of Jared Polis | Jared Polis | Democratic | January 3, 2009 | January 3, 2019 | CO-2 | Polis is the first openly gay male congressman to have come out at the time of his first election into the legislative branch. |
| Portrait of Kyrsten Sinema | Kyrsten Sinema | Democratic | January 3, 2013 | January 3, 2019 (Note: Sinema went on to become a United States senator on this date.) | AZ-9 | Sinema is the first openly bisexual member of Congress. |
| Portrait of Mark Takano | Mark Takano | Democratic | January 3, 2013 | Incumbent | CA-41 (until 2023) | Takano is the first openly LGBTQ Asian American member of Congress. |
| Portrait of Mark Takano | Mark Takano | Democratic | January 3, 2013 | Incumbent | CA-39 (since 2023) | Takano is the first openly LGBTQ Asian American member of Congress. |
| Portrait of Sharice Davids | Sharice Davids | Democratic | January 3, 2019 | Incumbent | KS-3 | Davids is the first openly LGBTQ Native American member of Congress. |
| Portrait of Mondaire Jones | Mondaire Jones | Democratic | January 3, 2021 | January 3, 2023 | NY-17 | Alongside Ritchie Torres, Jones is the first openly LGBTQ African American member of Congress. |
| Portrait of Ritchie Torres | Ritchie Torres | Democratic | January 3, 2021 | Incumbent | NY-15 | Alongside Mondaire Jones, Torres is the first openly LGBTQ African American member of Congress. Torres is also the first openly LGBTQ Latino member of Congress. |
| Portrait of Sarah McBride | Sarah McBride | Democratic | January 3, 2025 | Incumbent | DE-AL | McBride is the first openly transgender member of Congress. |

==== Senate ====
| Image | Name | Party | Start of first congressional term | End of last congressional term | State | Notes |
|---|---|---|---|---|---|---|
| Portrait of Tammy Baldwin | Tammy Baldwin | Democratic | January 3, 2013 (Note: Baldwin had previously served in the United States House of Representatives.) | Incumbent | Wisconsin | Baldwin is the first openly LGBTQ United States senator. |
| Portrait of Kyrsten Sinema | Kyrsten Sinema | Democratic (2019–2022) | January 3, 2019 (Note: Sinema had previously served in the United States House of Representatives.) | January 3, 2025 | Arizona | Sinema is the first openly bisexual United States senator. |
| Portrait of Kyrsten Sinema | Kyrsten Sinema | Independent (2022–2025) | January 3, 2019 | January 3, 2025 | Arizona | Sinema is the first openly bisexual United States senator. |
| Portrait of Laphonza Butler | Laphonza Butler | Democratic | October 3, 2023 | December 8, 2024 | California | Butler is the first openly LGBTQ African American United States senator. |
| Portrait of Chris Pappas | Chris Pappas | Democratic | January 3, 2027 | Incumbent | New Hampshire | Pappas is the first openly gay male United States senator. |

== State ==
=== Overall firsts ===
| Image | Name | Party | Entered office of first | Departed office of first | Office of first | State | Notes |
|---|---|---|---|---|---|---|---|
| Jerry DeGrieck in 1973 | Jerry DeGrieck | Human Rights | 1972 | 1974 | Member of the Ann Arbor City Council from Ward 1 | Michigan | Became the first openly gay elected official in the United States after coming out while in office. |
| Nancy Wechsler in 1973 | Nancy Wechsler | Human Rights | 1972 | 1974 | Member of the Ann Arbor City Council from Ward 2 | Michigan | Became the first openly lesbian elected official in the United States after coming out while in office. |
| Kathy Kozachenko in 1973 | Kathy Kozachenko | Human Rights | 1974 | 1976 | Member of the Ann Arbor City Council from Ward 2 | Michigan | First openly LGBTQ person to run and win an election in the United States. |
| Elaine Noble circa 1975 | Elaine Noble | Democratic | 1975 | 1979 | Member of the Massachusetts House of Representatives from the 6th Suffolk district | Massachusetts | First openly LGBTQ person elected to state legislature. |
| Harry Britt in 1985 | Harry Britt | Democratic | 1989 | 1990 | President of the San Francisco Board of Supervisors | California | First openly LGBTQ president of a city council. |
| Portrait of Althea Garrison in 1993 | Althea Garrison | Republican | 1993 | 1995 | Member of the Massachusetts House of Representatives from the 5th Suffolk District | Massachusetts | First transgender person elected to a state legislature; involuntarily outed after her election. |
| Harry Britt in 1985 | Ed Flanagan | Democratic | 1993 | 2001 | Vermont Auditor of Accounts | Vermont | First openly LGBTQ statewide official; came out in 1995. |
| | Allan Spear | Democratic | 1993 | 2001 | President of the Minnesota Senate | Minnesota | First openly LGBTQ state senate president. |
| | Tony Miller | Democratic | 1994 | 1995 | Secretary of State of California (acting) | California | First openly LGBTQ state secretary of state. Appointed in 1994 but lost reelection. |
| Dale McCormick in 2021 | Dale McCormick | Democratic | 1997 | 2005 | Maine State Treasurer | Maine | First openly LGBTQ state treasurer; elected by the Maine legislature. |
| Jim McGreevey in 2009 | Jim McGreevey | Democratic | 2002 | 2004 | Governor of New Jersey | New Jersey | First LGBTQ governor; came out in 2004 during his resignation speech. |
| | Jim Roth | Democratic | 2007 | 2009 | Member of the Oklahoma Corporation Commission | Oklahoma | First openly LGBTQ statewide official in the US South. Appointed by the governor of Oklahoma but lost reelection. |
| Gordon Fox Portrait | Gordon Fox | Democratic | 2010 | 2014 | Speaker of the Rhode Island House of Representatives | Rhode Island | First openly LGBTQ state house speaker. |
| | John S. Arrowood | Democratic | 2017 | present | Judge of the North Carolina Court of Appeals | North Carolina | First openly LGBTQ person elected to statewide office in the US South. Previously appointed to complete an expired term from 2007–2008. |
| Portrait of Maura Healey in 2023 | Maura Healey | Democratic | 2015 | 2023 | Attorney General of Massachusetts | Massachusetts | First openly LGBTQ state attorney general. |
| Kate Brown in 2022 | Kate Brown | Democratic | 2015 | 2023 | Governor of Oregon | Oregon | First openly LGBTQ and bisexual person elected governor. |
| Danica Roem in 2017 | Danica Roem | Democratic | 2018 | 2024 | Member of the Virginia House of Delegates from the 13th district | Virginia | First openly transgender person elected to state legislature. |
| Portrait of Josh Tenorio in 2025 | Josh Tenorio | Democratic | 2019 | present | Lieutenant Governor of Guam | Guam | First openly LGBTQ lieutenant governor. |
| Jared Polis in 2026 | Jared Polis | Democratic | 2019 | present | Governor of Colorado | Colorado | First openly gay man elected governor. |
| James Roesener in 2025 | James Roesener | Democratic | 2022 | present | Member of the New Hampshire House of Representatives from the Merrimack 22nd district | New Hampshire | First openly transgender man elected to state legislature. |
| Portrait of Maura Healey in 2023 | Maura Healey | Democratic | 2023 | present | Governor of Massachusetts | Massachusetts | First openly lesbian governor, along with Tina Kotek. |
| Tina Kotek in 2021 | Tina Kotek | Democratic | 2023 | present | Governor of Oregon | Oregon | First openly lesbian governor, along with Maura Healey. |

=== State officers by state ===
==== Constitutional officers ====
- Arizona:
  - Attorney general: Kris Mayes (D) – elected 2022
- California:
  - State insurance commissioner Ricardo Lara (D) – elected 2018
- Connecticut:
  - State comptroller: Kevin Lembo (D) – elected 2010
  - Commissioner of the Connecticut Office of Early Childhood: Beth Bye (D) - appointed January 2019
- Maine:
  - State treasurer – Dale McCormick (D), Maine – elected (by the legislature) 1996
- Michigan:
  - Attorney general: Dana Nessel (D) – elected 2018
- Oklahoma:
- Oregon:
  - Secretary of State: Kate Brown (D) – elected 2008

==== Legislative officials ====
- California:
  - Senate President pro Tempore: Sen. Toni Atkins (D) – elected 2018
  - House speaker: Rep. John Pérez (D) – elected 2010
- Colorado:
  - House speaker: Mark Ferrandino (D) (2012)
  - House minority leader: Mark Ferrandino (D) (2011)
- Hawaii:
  - House majority leader: Rep. Blake Oshiro (D) – elected 2008, came out 2010
- Maine:
  - House speaker: Rep. Ryan Fecteau (D) – elected 2020
- Massachusetts:
  - Senate minority leader: Sen. Richard Tisei (R) – elected 2007, came out 2010
  - Senate majority leader: Sen. Stan Rosenberg (D) – elected 2013, came out 2009
- Minnesota:
  - Senate president: Sen. Allan Spear (D) (1993)
- Missouri:
  - Senate minority floor leader: Sen. Jolie Justus (D) (2012)
- Oregon:
  - Senate minority leader: Sen. Kate Brown (D) (1998)
  - Senate majority leader: Sen. Kate Brown (D) (2003)
  - House speaker: Rep. Tina Kotek (D) – America's first openly lesbian House speaker (elected as Oregon's House speaker in 2012)
- Rhode Island:
  - House speaker: Rep. Gordon D. Fox (D) (2010)
- Vermont:
  - President pro tempore: Sen. Becca Balint (D) (2021)
- Washington:
  - Senate minority leader: Sen. Ed Murray (D) (2012)
- Wyoming:
  - House minority leader: Rep. Cathy Connolly (D) (2016)

=== State legislators ===
As of the 2020 elections, the legislatures of 49 states have had at least one openly LGBT member; the first out person to serve in each of those states is listed here. The sole remaining state that has never had an openly LGBT state legislator is Louisiana.

- Alabama:
  - Rep. Patricia Todd (D) – elected 2006 (female)
  - Rep. Neil Rafferty (D) – elected 2018 (male)
- Alaska:
  - Rep. Johnny Ellis (D) – elected 1986, came out 2016
- Arizona:
  - Ken Cheuvront (D) – served in both the Arizona House of Representatives and the Arizona Senate between 1994 and 2010 (male)
  - Paula Aboud (D) – elected to the Arizona Senate in 2006 (female)
- Arkansas:
  - Rep. Kathy Webb (D) – elected 2006
- California:
  - Assemblywoman (later Sen.) Sheila Kuehl (D) – elected 1994 to House; elected to Senate in 2000 – California's first openly gay state legislator
  - The 2004 elections in California sent six openly LGBT people to the California State Legislature: four lesbians (Assemblywoman Jackie Goldberg, Senator Sheila Kuehl, and Senator Carole Migden, Senator Christine Kehoe), and two gay men (Assemblyman Mark Leno and Assemblyman John Laird).
  - Rep. John Pérez (D) – first openly LGBT person to serve as speaker of the California State Assembly (appointed 2010) Pérez was succeeded as speaker by Assemblywoman Toni G. Atkins (D) (elected 2014), the second openly LGBT person (and the first lesbian) to hold the post.
- Colorado General Assembly:
  - Rep. (later Sen.) Jennifer Veiga (D) – Elected to the state House in 1996; became Colorado's first openly LGBT state legislature when she came out in 2002; subsequently reelected and served as House minority leader in 2003 (first LGBT person to hold this post); later elected to the state Senate.
  - Rep. Mark Ferrandino (D) – appointed October 2007, became first openly gay man to serve in the General Assembly. In 2012, Ferrandino became Colorado's first openly LGBT speaker of the Colorado House of Representatives.
  - Sen. Lucía Guzmán (D) – elected 2010; first LGBT person to serve as president pro tem of the Colorado Senate
  - In 2012, the first major state race in which both major-party candidates were LGBT occurred when Pat Steadman (D) and Michael Carr (R) ran against each other in Colorado's 31st state Senate district.
  - Rep. Leslie Herod (D) – elected 2016; first LGBT African-American to be elected to Colorado's state legislature.
  - Rep. Brianna Titone (D) – elected 2018; first openly transgender woman to be elected to Colorado's state legislature.
- Connecticut General Assembly:
  - Rep. Joseph Grabarz (D) – Connecticut's first openly LGBT state legislator; first elected in 1988; came out in December 1990.
  - Rep. Evelyn Mantilla (D) – came out as America's first openly bisexual state official in 1997.
- Delaware:
  - Sen. Karen E. Peterson (D) – came out 2013
  - Sen. Sarah McBride (D) – first openly transgender state senator
- Florida:
  - Rep. David Richardson (D) and Rep. Joe Saunders (D) – first openly gay Florida state legislators, both elected in 2012
- Georgia:
  - Rep. Karla Drenner (D) – elected 2000
  - Rep. Rashad Taylor (D) – elected 2008, came out 2011
  - Rep. Sam Park (D) – elected 2016
- Hawaii:
  - Rep. Joe Bertram (D) – elected 2006
  - Rep. Georgette Jo Jordan (Dem) – appointed January 2011; elected November 2012
  - Rep. Blake Oshiro (D) – first House majority leader, came out 2010
- Idaho:
  - Female: Rep. (later Sen.) Nicole LeFavour (D) – elected 2004
  - Male: Rep. John McCrostie (D) – elected 2014
- Illinois:
  - Rep. Larry McKeon (D) – elected 1996
  - Rep. Deb Mell (D) – elected 2009
  - Sen. Mike Simmons (D) – appointed 2021
- Indiana:
  - Sen. J. D. Ford (D) – elected 2018
- Iowa:
  - Male: Sen. Matt McCoy (D) – came out 2001
  - Female: Rep. Liz Bennett (D) – elected 2014
  - Norman Jesse and Dan Johnston, who were first elected to the state house in 1967, were not out during their careers in politics, but came out in retirement and revealed that they had been a couple.
- Kansas:
  - Susan Ruiz (D) – elected 2018
  - Brandon Woodard (D) – elected 2018
  - Rep Stephanie Byers (D) – elected 2020; first openly transgender person to serve in the Kansas Legislature; first transgender Native American person elected to public office.
- Kentucky:
  - Sen. Ernesto Scorsone (D) – came out 2003
  - Rep. (later Sen.) Keturah Herron (D) – elected to House 2022, elected to Senate 2024
- Maine:
  - Sen. Dale McCormick (D) – elected 1990
- Maryland:
  - Del. Maggie McIntosh (D) – came out 2001
  - Del. Richard Madaleno (D) – elected 2002
- Massachusetts:
  - Rep. Elaine Noble (D) – elected 1974
  - Rep. (later Sen.) Jarrett Barrios (D) – elected to House 1999, elected to Senate 2003
  - Rep. Althea Garrison (R) – elected 1993, first transgender person elected to a state legislature in the United States.
  - Sen. Cheryl Jacques (D) – elected 1993
- Michigan:
  - Rep. Chris Kolb (D) – elected in 2000
- Minnesota:
  - Sen. Allan Spear (D) – elected 1972, came out December 1974
  - Rep. Erin Maye Quade (D) – elected in 2016, ran for lieutenant governor with Erin Murphy in 2018 and is the first LGBTQ person to be endorsed on the ticket of a major Minnesota political party
  - Rep. Karen Clark (D) – elected 1981, out when first elected and was the longest serving openly lesbian member to serve in a state legislature in the United States
  - Sen. Paul Koering (R) – elected 2002; came out 2005; re-elected in 2006
  - Sen. Scott Dibble (D) – elected in 2000, out when first elected
  - Rep. Susan Allen (D) – elected in 2012, out when first elected and first openly lesbian Native American woman to win office in any state legislature
  - Rep. Leigh Finke (D) - elected in 2022. The first out transgender state legislator elected in Minnesota.
- Mississippi:
  - Rep. Fabian Nelson (D) - elected in 2023
- Missouri:
  - Rep. Tim Van Zandt (D) – elected 1994; first openly gay person elected to the Missouri House of Representatives
  - Rep. Jeanette Oxford (D) – elected 2004; first openly gay woman in the Missouri House of Representatives
  - Rep. Zachary Wyatt (R) – elected 2010; came out 2012 and first openly gay republican in the Missouri House of Representatives
  - Rep. Tom Hannegan (R) – elected 2016; out when first elected and first openly gay when elected republican in the Missouri House of Representatives
  - Sen. Jolie Justus (D) – elected 2007; first openly gay person elected to the Missouri Senate
  - Rep. Randy D. Dunn (D) – elected 2012; first openly gay African American in the Missouri House of Representatives
  - Rep. Ashley Bland Manlove (D) – elected 2018; first openly gay African American woman in the Missouri House of Representatives
  - Sen. Greg Razer (D) – elected 2020; first openly gay man elected to the Missouri Senate
- Montana:
  - Rep. Diane Sands (D) – appointed 1996
  - Rep. Bryce Bennett (D) – elected 2010
  - Rep. Zooey Zephyr (D) – elected 2022; first openly transgender legislator in Montana
- Nebraska:
  - Sen. Megan Hunt – elected 2018; first openly bisexual person elected to the Nebraska Legislature
  - Sen. John Fredrickson – elected 2022; first openly gay man elected to the Nebraska Legislature
- Nevada:
  - Assemblyman (now Sen.) David Parks (D) (male) – elected 1996
  - Senator Patricia Spearman (female) (D) – elected 2012
- New Hampshire:
  - Rep. Raymond Buckley (male) (D) – elected 1986
  - Rep. Marlene DeChane (female) (D) – elected 1994
  - Sen. David Pierce (D) – elected 2012, first open LGBT person ever elected to the New Hampshire Senate
  - Chris Pappas (D) – elected 2012, first LGBT person ever elected to the New Hampshire Executive Council
  - Sen. Dan Innis (male) (R) – elected 2016, first Republican open LGBT person ever elected to the New Hampshire Senate
  - Reps. Gerri Cannon and Lisa Bunker (D) – elected 2018, first openly transgender people ever seated in the New Hampshire House of Representatives
- New Jersey:
  - Assemblyman Reed Gusciora (D) – came out 2006
- New Mexico:
  - Sen. Liz Stefanics (female) (D) – elected 1992
  - Sen. Jacob Candelaria (male) (D) – elected 2012
- New York:
  - Rep. Deborah Glick (female) (D) – elected 1990, first openly lesbian or gay person elected to the NY State Legislature
  - Sen. Thomas Duane (male) (D) – elected 1998, first openly gay and/or HIV positive person elected to the NY State Senate
  - Rep. Daniel J. O'Donnell (male) (D) – elected 2002
  - Rep. Micah Kellner (male; bisexual) (D) – elected 2007
  - Rep. Harry Bronson (male) (D) – elected 2010, first LGBT legislator elected from upstate New York
  - Sen. Jabari Brisport (male) (D) – elected 2020, first gay male legislator of Black African ancestry and from Brooklyn elected to NY Legislature
- North Carolina:
  - Sen. Julia Boseman (D) – elected 2004
  - Rep. Marcus Brandon (male) (D) – elected 2010
- North Dakota:
  - Rep. Joshua Boschee (D) – elected 2012
- Ohio:
  - Rep. Nickie Antonio (D) – elected 2010
  - Rep. Tim Brown (R) – elected 2012
- Oklahoma:
  - Rep. (then Sen.) Al McAffrey (male) (D) – elected 2006; elected first state senator 2012
  - Rep. Kay Floyd (female) (D) – elected 2012
  - Rep. Mo Turner (D) – elected 2020, first openly non-binary state legislator in the United States
- Oregon:
  - Rep. Gail Shibley (D) – appointed 1991; elected 1992
  - Rep. George Eighmey (D) – appointed 1993; elected 1994
  - Rep. Chuck Carpenter (R) – elected 1994, first openly gay Republican legislator in the nation
  - Rep. Kate Brown (D) – appointed 1991; elected 1992, 1994
  - Sen. Kate Brown (D) – elected 1996
  - Rep. Tina Kotek (D) – elected 2006; first openly lesbian speaker of the House
- Pennsylvania:
  - Rep. Mike Fleck (R) – elected 2007, came out 2012
  - Rep. Brian Sims (D) – elected (while out) 2012
  - Sen. Jim Ferlo (D) – came out 2014
  - Rep. Malcolm Kenyatta (D), first gay person of color to serve in either house of the Pennsylvania state legislature.
- Rhode Island:
  - Sen. William P. Fitzpatrick (D) – elected 1992, ran as openly gay; statewide publicity after election
  - Rep. Mike Pisaturo (D) – elected 1996
  - Rep. Nancy Hetherington (D) – elected 1994, came out in 2001
  - Sen. Donna Nesselbush (D) – elected 2010
- South Dakota:
  - Sen. Angie Buhl (D) (bisexual) – elected 2011, came out 2012
- South Carolina:
  - Rep. Jason Elliott (R) – elected 2016
- Tennessee:
  - Rep. Torrey Harris (D) – elected 2020
  - Rep. Eddie Mannis (R) – elected 2020
- Texas:
  - Rep. Glen Maxey (D) – elected 1991
  - Rep. Mary Gonzalez (D) – elected 2012; first openly pansexual elected official in the United States
  - Rep. Jolanda Jones (D) – elected 2022; first openly gay African American elected to the Texas legislature.
  - Rep. Christian Manuel (D) – elected 2022; along with Venton Jones, first openly gay African American man elected to the Texas legislature.
  - Rep. Venton Jones (D) – elected 2022; along with Christian Manuel, first openly gay African American man elected to the Texas legislature. First openly HIV positive person elected to the Texas legislature.
  - Sen. Molly Cook (D) – elected 2024; first openly bisexual and openly LGBTQ+ member of the Texas Senate
- Utah:
  - Rep. Jackie Biskupski (D) – elected 1998
  - Sen. Scott McCoy (D) – elected 2005
- Vermont:
  - Rep. Ron Squires (D) – elected 1990
  - Rep. Suzi Wizowaty (D) – elected 2008
  - Sen. Ed Flanagan (D) – elected 2005
  - Rep. Taylor Small (D, Progressive) – elected 2020; first openly transgender Vermont legislator
- Virginia:
  - Del. (now Sen.) Adam Ebbin (D) – elected 2003; elected first state senator 2011
  - Del. Dawn Adams (D) – elected 2017
  - Del. Danica Roem (D) – elected 2017; first openly transgender person to be elected to a state legislature in the United States.
  - Del. Joshua G. Cole (D) – elected 2019; first LGBT person of color and first openly bisexual legislator in VA
  - Del. Rozia Henson (D) – elected 2023; first gay black man elected to the Virginia legislature.
- Washington State:
  - Rep. (later Sen.) Cal Anderson (D) – appointed 1987
  - Rep. Laurie Jinkins (female) (D) – elected 2010
- West Virginia:
  - Rep. Stephen Skinner (D) – elected 2012
- Wisconsin:
  - Rep. (later Sen.) Tim Carpenter (D) – elected to Assembly in 1984, came out in 2001, elected to Senate in 2002
  - Rep. (later U.S. rep) Mark Pocan (D) – elected 1998
  - Rep. (later U.S. sen.) Tammy Baldwin (female; lesbian) (D) – elected 1993
  - Rep. JoCasta Zamarripa (female; bisexual) (D) – elected 2010; came out 2012
- Wyoming:
  - Rep. Cathy Connolly (D) – elected 2008
  - Rep. Dan Zwonitzer (R) – elected 2005

=== Territorial legislators ===
- District of Columbia
  - Jim Graham
  - David Catania
- Guam:
  - Sen. Benjamin Cruz (D) – elected 2008

== Local ==
=== Nationwide firsts ===
- Largest city (in the country) with an openly lesbian mayor: Lori Lightfoot, Chicago, Illinois (2019) (Formerly held by Annise Parker, Houston, Texas (2009))
- Largest city with an openly gay male mayor: Todd Gloria, San Diego, California (2020)
- First openly LGBT members of a city council: Nancy Wechsler and Jerry DeGrieck, both elected as members of the Human Rights Party to the Ann Arbor City Council in 1972; both came out in 1973.
- First openly gay person (male or female) elected to public office (city council): Kathy Kozachenko, Ann Arbor, Michigan (1974)
- First openly gay man elected to a U.S. city council (incumbent): Jim Yeadon, Madison, Wisconsin (1977)
- First openly gay or lesbian elected official in California: Harvey Milk, member of the San Francisco Board of Supervisors; elected 1977, assassinated in 1978 by Dan White shortly after White killed Mayor George Moscone.
- First directly elected openly gay mayor in the U.S.: Gene Ulrich, Bunceton, Missouri (1980)
- First openly gay black person elected to public office in the United States: Keith St. John, elected to Albany, New York common council in 1989.
- First openly gay Hispanic person elected to public office in the United States: Ricardo Gonzalez, Madison, Wisconsin (1989)
- First openly transgender member of a city council: Joanne Conte (Arvada, Colorado) – trans woman, served on Arvada City Council from 1991 to 1995. Also the first openly transgender person elected to any office in the United States.
- First openly gay mayor of a U.S. state capital: David Cicilline, Providence, Rhode Island (2002)
- First openly gay president of a city council: Cathy Woolard, Atlanta City Council President from 2002 to 2004.
- First openly gay City Council speaker: Christine Quinn (elected 2006)
- First openly transgender mayor: Stu Rasmussen, Silverton, Oregon (2008)
- First openly bisexual member of a city council: Marlene Pray, joined Doylestown, Pennsylvania, council in 2012, resigned 2013 (also first openly bisexual office holder in Pennsylvania).
- First openly gay married couple to serve elected public office together for the same municipality (Borough Council): Thos Shipley and Joe DeIorio, Roselle Park, New Jersey, 2018.

=== By state ===
- Alaska
  - Mayor of Anchorage: Austin Quinn-Davidson, 2020
- Arizona
  - Tempe
    - Mayor: Neil Giuliano, 1994–2004
- California
  - Ron Galperin was the first openly gay citywide elected official in Los Angeles when he was elected city controller in 2013. Galperin was re-elected to a second term in 2017.
  - Vivian Romero was the first openly gay citywide elected official in Montebello when she was elected city councilmember in 2013. She was also the first openly gay female Mayor in 2018.
  - Robert F. Gentry was elected mayor of Laguna Beach, in 1982, becoming the first openly gay mayor in California and the first openly gay elected official in southern California.
  - John Laird was elected mayor of Santa Cruz in 1983.
  - Danny Wan was appointed member of the Oakland City Council in 1999, and elected in the post in 2002, becoming the city's first openly gay politician.
  - Ron Oden was elected mayor of Palm Springs in 2003; he became the first openly gay black man elected mayor of an American city and was the first openly gay mayor of Palm Springs.
  - Mike Gin was elected mayor of Redondo Beach in 2005, becoming the first openly gay Asian-American mayor elected in the US and the first Republican gay mayor elected in California.
  - Todd Gloria was elected mayor of San Diego in 2020, becoming the first gay and first person of color to serve as mayor of the 8th largest city in America as well as the first Native American and Filipino-American to serve as mayor of a city of more than one million people.
  - Christopher Cabaldon was elected mayor of West Sacramento in 1998 and came out in 2006, making him the first openly gay Filipino elected as mayor in the US. As of 2016, he is the longest-serving LGBT mayor.
  - Evan Low was elected mayor of Campbell in 2009, at the age 26, making him the youngest gay mayor (and the youngest Asian-American mayor) nationwide at the time. Low was reelected in 2013.
  - Joe Mosca took office as mayor of Sierra Madre in 2010, becoming the first openly gay mayor in the San Gabriel Valley. By 2010, there were four openly gay mayors in Los Angeles County: Mosca, John Heilman of West Hollywood, Mitch Ward of Manhattan Beach, and Mike Gin of Redondo Beach.
  - Bao Nguyen was elected mayor of Garden Grove, in 2014, at the age 34, making him the first gay mayor and first Vietnamese mayor of Garden Grove, as well as the youngest mayor in Orange County. He also became the first Vietnamese Democratic mayor in the United States.
  - Gerrie Schipske, was elected to Long Beach Community College Board of Trustees, 1992–1996, served as president, and was elected to Long Beach City Council, 2006–2014, in each case becoming the first openly lesbian elected official.
  - Gary Miller was elected to the Robla Elementary School District Board in 1987 and became the first openly Gay local elected official in Sacramento and Sacramento County. Miller won re-election many times and served on the board from 1987 to 2006. Mr Miller was also the first openly Gay local elected official in Placer County where he won a seat on the Roseville City School Board in 2008, won re-election in multiple races, and served until 2020.
  - Shannon Moon was elected as Sheriff-Coroner of Nevada County California in 2018 She claimed the title as the first openly gay sheriff in California history. She is currently serving as of 2024.
- Connecticut
  - Pedro Segarra was the first openly gay mayor of Hartford. Segarra, the former president of the city council, became mayor in 2010 after his predecessor Eddie A. Perez resigned from office. Segarra won a full term in the 2011 election.
  - Daryl Justin Finizio was the first openly gay mayor of New London (elected 2011).
- Delaware
  - The first openly gay elected official was John Brady as Sussex County Register in Chancery (chief clerk of court) in 2000. Brady also served as the Sussex County recorder of deeds and Sussex County clerk of the peace (Marriage Bureau chief official) before retiring after 14 years of Service
  - The first openly gay mayor in Delaware was John Buchheit of Delaware City (elected 2011).
- Florida
  - Richard A. Heyman – elected mayor of Key West in 1983, becoming the first openly LGBT mayor in Florida and one of the first openly LGBT mayors in the United States (Robert F. Gentry of Laguna Beach, California, and John Laird of Santa Cruz, California, were both elected the same year).
  - J.P. Sasser – mayor of Pahokee; came out in 2006, while in his third term in office
  - Ken Keechl – first openly LGBT person to serve on the Broward County Commission (elected 2006), and to serve as vice mayor (2008) and mayor (2009) of Broward County (mayor and vice mayor are chosen by vote on commissioners)
  - Craig Lowe – first openly LGBT mayor of Gainesville (and of any north Florida city); elected 2010
  - Teri Johnston – first openly lesbian mayor of Key West and first openly lesbian mayor in Florida in 2018.
  - Justin Flippen – first openly gay mayor of Wilton Manors in 2018.
  - Dean Trantalis – first openly gay mayor of Fort Lauderdale in 2018.
  - Jane Castor – first openly lesbian mayor of Tampa in 2019.
  - J. Tyler Payne – first openly gay mayor of Treasure Island, Florida in 2021.
- Georgia
  - Cathy Woolard was elected to the Atlanta City Council in 1997, becoming the first openly LGBT elected official in the state of Georgia. She went on to become council president.
  - Ben Ku was elected to the Gwinnett County Board of Commissioners in 2018, becoming the first openly LGBT official to be elected to the Gwinnett County Board of Commissioners.
  - Stephen Wimberly was elected to the Fulton County Democratic Committee in 1990, becoming one of the first openly LGBT elected committee members. Stephen ran the campaign as an openly LGBT man, running unopposed. Stephen was a board member with "LEGAL" Legislate Equality for Gays And Lesbians, a group dedicated to change politics from within.
- Hawaii
  - Tim Riley was elected to the Waianae neighborhood board in February 2019.
- Illinois
  - Lori Lightfoot, was elected Mayor of Chicago in April 2019, making her the first openly gay mayor of Chicago and making Chicago the largest US city ever to elect an openly gay mayor.
- Indiana
  - Pete Buttigieg, first major political party candidate for president; before that mayor of South Bend – publicly announced that he was gay in 2015, while in his first term in office; first openly LGBT executive official in Indiana.
  - Veronica Pejril – Indiana's first transgender elected official, Greencastle city council, elected 2019.
- Iowa
  - Bill Crews – mayor of Melbourne; came out while in office (reelected 1995)
- Kansas
  - Longest-serving LGBTQ elected official: Henry Schwaller, elected 1999 – city commissioner, Hays, Kansas
  - Mayor: C.C. Smith (female), elected 2017 – Linn Valley, Kansas
  - Kansas has six openly-LGBT city councillors/commissioners, including in two of the state's ten biggest cities: Shawnee and Manhattan.
- Kentucky
  - Lexington
    - Mayor: Jim Gray
- Maine
  - Geo Soctomah Neptune – elected 2020; first trans, non-binary, and two-spirit person elected to public office in Maine
- Massachusetts
  - Attleboro
    - Mayor: Cathleen DeSimone, elected 2023
    - Mayor: Kevin Dumas, elected 2003
    - City Council: Laurie Sawyer, elected 2023
    - School Committee: Dianne Sawyer, elected 2013
  - Cambridge
    - Kenneth Reeves (male), elected 1992
    - E. Denise Simmons (female), elected 2008
  - Lynn
    - City Council President: Constantino "Coco" Alinsug, elected 2021
    - School Committee: Dr. Brenda Ortiz McGrath, elected 2025
    - School Committee: Tristan Smith, Esq., elected 2025
  - Revere
    - Steven Morabito (male), elected 2013
    - E. Denise Simmons (female), elected 2008
  - Worcester
    - Thu Nguyen (nonbinary), elected 2022
- Michigan
  - Ferndale
    - Mayor: Craig Covey
- Minnesota
  - Minneapolis
    - Andrea Jenkins elected in 2017, first openly transgender black woman elected to public office in the United States
    - Phillipe Cunningham elected in 2017, first openly transgender black man elected to a city council in the United States
  - Richard Carlbom- First openly gay mayor of a city in Minnesota. He served as the mayor of St. Joseph from 2005 to 2007.
  - Mary Moriarty elected 2023, first LGBT Hennepin County attorney
- Mississippi
  - Pike County
    - Board of Supervisors: Justin Lofton, elected in 2023, first out LGBTQ county supervisor in the state of Mississippi
  - Southaven
    - Mayor: Greg Davis (came out in 2011)
- New Hampshire
  - Nashua
    - Board of Education: Tim Nickerson, elected 1997, First openly gay person elected at any level in NH. Others previously elected came out after his election
- New Jersey
  - Chatham Borough
    - Mayor: Bruce Harris, elected 2011
  - Maywood
    - Mayor: Tim Eustace
- New Mexico
  - Santa Fe
    - Mayor: Javier Gonzales
- New York
  - Eddie Sundquist, elected 2019, is the first openly gay mayor of Jamestown, New York.
    - Daniel L. Stewart – First openly gay elected mayor in New York State history: 1999 Plattsburgh, NY (3-terms)
    - First openly gay council member Plattsburgh, NY (3-terms)
    - First executive branch appointed chairman of a state correctional regulatory over-site agency, NYSCOC. Served 4 Governors, (R) and (D)
- North Carolina
  - Wake County (NC capital county, incl. Raleigh)
    - Commissioner Greg Ford, first openly gay county commissioner in Wake County and first openly gay board chairman (elected 2019) and vice chairman (elected 2018) in North Carolina. Elected in 2016. Reelected in 2018.
  - Carrboro
    - Mayor Michael R. Nelson, elected 1995 (first openly gay mayor elected in NC)
  - Chapel Hill
    - Town councilman Joe Herzenberg, elected 1987 (first openly gay elected official in the South)
    - Mayor Mark Kleinschmidt, elected 2009
  - Raleigh
    - Raleigh city councilman: Saige Martin, elected 2019
- Oregon
  - Portland
    - Sam Adams
  - Silverton
    - Stu Rasmussen (transgender)
- Pennsylvania
  - Erie
    - Tyler Titus, a transgender man, became the first openly transgender person elected to public office in Pennsylvania when he was elected to the Erie School Board in 2017.
- Rhode Island
  - Providence
    - Mayor: David Cicilline, elected November 2002, assumed office January 2003
- South Carolina
  - Laurens
    - Mayor (Any City): Nathan Senn, first openly gay mayor; elected 2019, assumed office March 2019, re-elected 2023
- Texas
  - San Antonio
    - Councilman (District 2): Jalen McKee-Rodriguez, elected June 5, 2021, assumed office June 15, 2021
    - Mayor: Gina Ortiz Jones, elected and assumed office in June 2025
  - Houston
    - Mayor: Annise Parker, elected 2009, assumed office January 2010
  - Kemp
    - Mayor: Matthew Ganssle, elected 2009, assumed office May 2009
  - New Hope
    - Mayor: Jess Herbst, appointed 2016, came out as transgender 2017
- Utah
  - Willy Marshall, a member of the Libertarian Party, became the first openly gay mayor in Utah when he was elected mayor of Big Water in 2001.
- Virginia
  - Joe Cobb, first openly gay Mayor of the City of Roanoke, Virginia, elected in 2024, and first openly gay Vice-Mayor of Roanoke, Virginia, serving July 1, 2018 - December 31, 2020 and January 1, 2023 - December 31, 2024.
  - Jay Fisette, elected member of Arlington County Board, Virginia, as openly gay in 1997. Served until 2017.
  - Joel McDonald, member of the Virginia Beach School Board, elected 2012. First openly gay candidate to be elected in Hampton Roads.
  - Lawrence Webb, elected member of Falls Church City School Board, Virginia. First openly gay elected African American in Virginia in 2008 to Falls Church City Council. Current member of the Falls Church City School Board.
- Washington
  - Seattle
    - Mayor: Ed Murray (male)
    - Mayor: Jenny Durkan (female)
- West Virginia
  - Harpers Ferry
    - Mayor: Joe Anderson (2011–2013)
- Wisconsin
  - Satya Rhodes-Conway – mayor of Madison.

== Judicial ==
=== National ===
| Image | Name | Entered court of first | Departed court of first | Title of first | Notes |
|---|---|---|---|---|---|
| Portrait of Deborah Batts | Deborah Batts | May 9, 1994 | April 13, 2012 | Judge of the United States District Court for the Southern District of New York | Batts was the nation's first openly LGBTQ federal judge. She was appointed by President Bill Clinton to the District Court for the Southern District of New York and confirmed by the United States Senate in a voice vote in 1994. Judge Vaughn Walker of the Northern District of California served from 1989 to February 2011 but did not come out until April 2011, after his retirement. |
| | J. Paul Oetken | July 20, 2011 | Incumbent | Judge of the United States District Court for the Southern District of New York | Oetken is the first openly gay man to serve as an Article III judge. |
| Portrait of Michael W. Fitzgerald | Michael W. Fitzgerald | March 15, 2012 | Incumbent | Judge of the United States District Court for the Central District of California | Fitzgerald is the first openly LGBTQ federal judge to serve on a California court. |
| Portrait of Pamela K. Chen | Pamela K. Chen | March 5, 2013 | Incumbent | Judge of the United States District Court for the Eastern District of New York | Chen is the first LGBTQ Asian American to serve as a federal judge. |
| Portrait of Michael J. McShane | Michael J. McShane | May 30, 2013 | Incumbent | Judge of the United States District Court for the District of Oregon | McShane is the first openly LGBTQ federal judge to serve on an Oregon court. |
| Portrait of Nitza Quiñones Alejandro | Nitza Quiñones Alejandro | June 19, 2013 | Incumbent | Judge of the United States District Court for the Eastern District of Pennsylvania | Quiñones is the first lesbian Latina to serve as a federal judge. |
| Portrait of Todd M. Hughes | Todd M. Hughes | September 24, 2013 | Incumbent | Judge of the United States Court of Appeals for the Federal Circuit | Hughes is the first openly gay judge on a federal appellate court. |
| Portrait of Judith E. Levy | Judith E. Levy | March 14, 2014 | Incumbent | Judge of the United States District Court for the Eastern District of Michigan | Levy is the first openly lesbian federal judge to serve on a Michigan court. |
| Portrait of Staci M. Yandle | Staci M. Yandle | June 19, 2014 | Incumbent | Judge of the United States District Court for the Southern District of Illinois | Yandle is the first openly gay judge to serve in the Seventh Circuit. |

=== State and municipal ===
The first openly gay judge in the United States was Stephen M. Lachs, appointed by Governor Jerry Brown to the Los Angeles County Superior Court in 1979. Before leaving office in 1981, Brown appointed three more gay and lesbian judges to the California courts, including the nation's first openly lesbian judge, Mary Morgan, who served on the San Francisco municipal court.

In 1994, Thomas R. Chiola became the first openly gay judge in Illinois (and the first openly gay elected official in Illinois) when voters elected him to the Circuit Court of Cook County.

The first openly LGBT justice of a state supreme court was Rives Kistler, appointed to the Oregon Supreme Court in 2003, and retained by voters the following year. The next gay or lesbian state supreme court justices were Virginia Linder (Oregon Supreme Court, 2006); Monica Márquez (Colorado Supreme Court, 2010); Barbara Lenk (Massachusetts Supreme Judicial Court, 2011); Sabrina McKenna (Supreme Court of Hawaii, 2011); Beth Robinson (Vermont Supreme Court, 2011). In 2017, Paul Feinman became the first openly gay judge to sit on the New York Court of Appeals.

Benjamin Cruz of Guam was the first openly gay judge of a territorial supreme court; he came out in 1995 and was appointed to the Supreme Court of Guam in 1997. Cruz served as associate justice from 1997 to 1999 and as chief justice from 1999 until his retirement in 2001.

The first openly bisexual judge in the United States is Mike Jacobs, a state court judge in DeKalb County, Georgia, who came out publicly in 2018.

- State judge of compensation claims: Rand Hoch, Flagler, Seminole and Volusia counties, Florida – appointed 1992
- Transgender judge: Victoria Kolakowski, Superior Court of Alameda County, California – elected 2010
- Superior Court judge Victor Carlson, 3rd Judicial District State of Alaska at Anchorage – appointed 1975 served until 1985 when he lost a retention election that was held in the shadow of his coming out.

== See also ==
- List of the first openly LGBTQ holders of political offices
- List of non-binary political office-holders
- List of LGBT politicians in the United States
- List of the first women holders of political offices in the United States
- List of transgender public officeholders in the United States
