= Robert J. Harris (mayor) =

American politician and lawyer (1930–2005)

Robert J. "Bob" Harris (October 5, 1930 – July 9, 2005) was a lawyer, professor, and mayor of the city of Ann Arbor in the U.S. state of Michigan.

== Life and career ==
Harris was born in Boston, Massachusetts. He was educated at Wesleyan University, where he was elected to Phi Beta Kappa. He was then a Rhodes Scholar and went on to Yale Law School, where he was a member of the Law Review and Order of the Coif. He served in the U.S. Army during the Korean War. He came to Ann Arbor, Michigan in 1959 as a professor in the University of Michigan Law School, where he taught full-time from 1959 to 1974.

Harris was elected Mayor of Ann Arbor on the Democratic ticket on April 7, 1969, defeating Republican candidate Richard E. Balzhiser. He was re-elected on April 5, 1971, defeating Republican Jack J. Garris. During his second term in office, Harris worked with a liberal/radical coalition on city council, composed of four Democrats and two members of the local, left-wing Human Rights Party (HRP), who held the balance of power beginning in 1972. Harris supported HRP efforts to decriminalize marijuana use in Ann Arbor (see Cannabis laws in Ann Arbor, Michigan), telling the Washington Post: "In this town, it was the only way to go. ... We've made a great effort to get a decent relationship between the kids and the cops. Now at least we'll get the police out of the marijuana business." In 1973, after two two-year terms in the mayor's post, Harris chose not to run for another term. That year, the liberal/radical coalition lost power, as Republican James E. Stephenson won the mayoralty and local Republicans took control of seven seats on the ten-seat city council.

After 1974, Harris continued as an adjunct faculty member at the law school, while practicing law as the senior partner of an Ann Arbor law firm he founded. The firm included, at various times, Bob Guenzel (later Washtenaw County Corporation Counsel, and then County Administrator), Ed Goldman (later general counsel of the University of Michigan Hospitals), and Jerry Lax (former Ann Arbor city attorney and candidate for a federal judicial appointment during the Clinton administration).

Harris served on many community boards and was a founding member of Friends of Legal Aid, which provides support to Legal Services of South Central Michigan. He also did extensive pro bono work for indigent individuals and for numerous groups, including Ozone House, Perry Nursery School and S.O.S. Community Services.

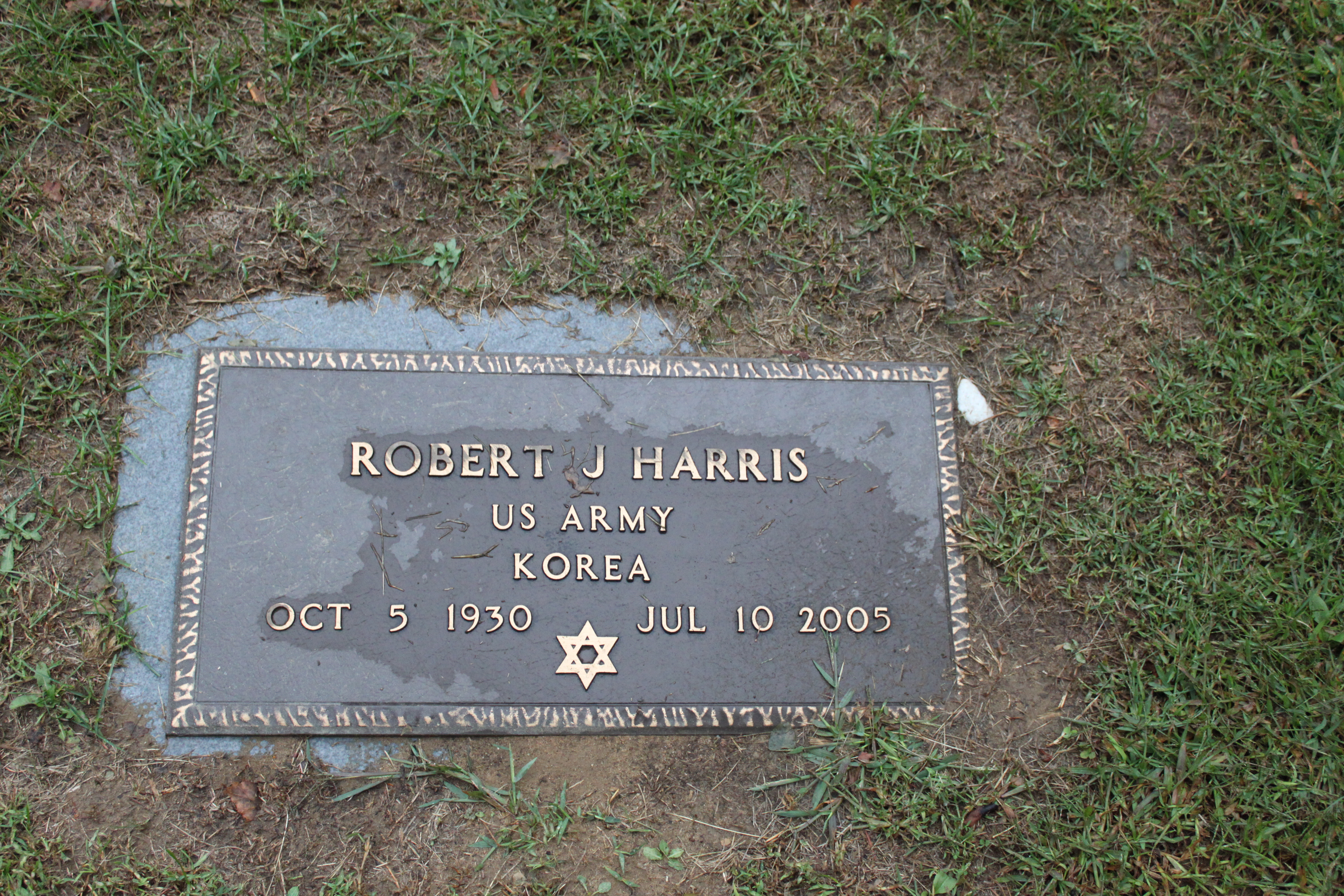
Harris grave

In his retirement, Harris tutored children in reading and volunteered for Food Gatherers. He also had a passion for model airplanes and jazz.

Harris, who was Jewish, was at times a member of Temple Beth Emeth (Reform) in Ann Arbor.

He died in 2005 at the age of 74 from brain lymphoma, and is interred in Arborcrest Cemetery in Ann Arbor.

Preceded by Wendell E. Hulcher	Mayor of Ann Arbor, Michigan; 1969–1973	Succeeded by James E. Stephenson
