= Cannabis laws in Ann Arbor, Michigan =

Since the 1970s, the college town of Ann Arbor, Michigan, has enacted some of the most lenient laws on marijuana possession in the United States. These include measures approved in a 1971 city-council ordinance, a 1974 voter referendum making possession of small amounts of the substance merely a civil infraction subject to a small fine, and a 2004 referendum on the use of medical marijuana. The passage of the Michigan Regulation and Taxation of Marihuana Act in November 2018 has made recreational marijuana legal not only in Ann Arbor but throughout the entire state.

== Marijuana ordinance of 1971 ==
Through the 1960s and early 1970s, as Ann Arbor played host to a number of radical organizations—including formative meetings of Students for a Democratic Society, the establishment of the White Panther Party, and the local Human Rights Party—public opinion in the city moved steadily to the left on the criminalization of marijuana possession. The Michigan Daily, the main student newspaper at the University of Michigan, gained national press coverage by urging the legalization of marijuana as early as 1967. However, two more specific factors pushed the city towards the eventual adoption of marijuana enforcement provisions that proved to be among the most liberal in the country.

The first factor was local reaction to the state penalties, which provided for a year's imprisonment for possession of two ounces (57 g) or less, four years' imprisonment for the sale of marijuana, and harsher penalties for repeat offenses. These penalties received national attention when poet and activist John Sinclair was sentenced to ten years in prison for possession of two joints, a sentence that sparked the landmark John Sinclair Freedom Rally at Ann Arbor's Crisler Arena on December 10, 1971. The event brought together proponents in left-wing politics, including pop musicians John Lennon, Stevie Wonder, and Bob Seger, jazz artists Archie Shepp and Roswell Rudd, and speakers Allen Ginsberg, Rennie Davis, Jerry Rubin, and Bobby Seale. Three days after the rally, Sinclair was released from prison after the Michigan Supreme Court ruled that the state's marijuana statutes were unconstitutional.

The second factor was the April 1972 election to Ann Arbor city council of two candidates from the Human Rights Party (HRP), an organization that promoted local progressive and radical causes. In September 1972, several months after they took their seats on council, the HRP's two council members spearheaded a bill that would reduce city penalties for possession of less than two ounces of marijuana to a $5 civil-infraction ticket. (The city penalty had previously been identical to the state penalty.) City police would then charge violators under the city ordinance rather than the state statute. The HRP representatives, by garnering the support of Democratic council members, quickly managed to pass the ordinance over the objections of council Republicans. In supporting the new ordinance, Democratic mayor Robert J. Harris told The Washington Post, "In this town, it was the only way to go. ... We've made a great effort to get a decent relationship between the kids and the cops. Now at least we'll get the police out of the marijuana business."

Outside observers characterized the ordinance as the most lenient in the country. In press interviews, the city attorney, Jerold Lax, described the penalty as "sort of like a parking ticket", explaining that violators could mail the ticket, with a guilty plea and the fine, back to city hall in order to dispose of the charge. City police and prosecutors agreed to use the $5 city ordinance, rather than the still-applicable state laws, as the tool for enforcement against violators. The city police chief, however, promised to continue to pursue large-scale drug dealers aggressively, using the harsher state laws against this class of violator.

Shortly after the measure's adoption, The New York Times reported: "Under the trees on the University of Michigan campus, in the back rows of movie theaters—even, it is said, in the public gallery of the City Council chamber itself—young people are increasingly lighting up marijuana in public these days." However, both police and independent academic observers asserted in national media articles that the amount of marijuana smoked in the city had not increased; the locations had merely switched to include more public spaces.

== Charter amendment of 1974 ==
Within weeks of its adoption, the new marijuana ordinance had sparked outrage in many parts of the state. The director of the Michigan State Police, for instance, immediately threatened to move his troopers into Ann Arbor in order to enforce the state codes against possession of marijuana. In the first test case, decided on September 29, 1972, a district court judge ruled the ordinance unconstitutional as an "intrusion of Ann Arbor in the judicial functions of the State of Michigan." City voters responded in November by electing Perry Bullard to the Michigan House of Representatives on a platform that called for full legalization of the possession, but not sale, of marijuana by adults throughout the state.

Despite the adverse court ruling, the city's marijuana ordinance remained in place until June 1973, when it was repealed by the city council. The local debate attracted attention from a number of national media outlets, including CBS and NBC television news programs and The New York Times. During the council's vote to repeal, about 150 spectators packed council chambers to light up joints in protest, and one protester hurled a cherry pie at Mayor James Stephenson.

On April 2, 1974, voters in Ann Arbor overruled the council's decision by amending the city charter with the famous Section 16.2, which, in somewhat altered form, remains in effect today. The charter section reinstated the $5 civil-infraction penalty for possession, use, giving away, or selling of marijuana and prohibited city police from enforcing the more stringent state laws. The same day, the neighboring city of Ypsilanti adopted a similar measure. In adopting the charter amendment, Ann Arbor voters asserted that the provisions were necessary to ensure the "just and equitable legal treatment of the citizens of this community, and in particular of the youth of this community present as university students or otherwise."

Part of Section 16.2 declared that no city police officer "shall complain of the possession, control, use, giving away, or sale of marijuana or cannabis to any other authority except the Ann Arbor city attorney; and the city attorney shall not refer any said complaint to any other authority for prosecution." In doing so, the provision effectively denied state courts the opportunity to declare the measure unconstitutional, as had occurred in 1972, since a test-case opportunity would thus never come before a state judge.

The perception of the city as a haven for marijuana permeated the local culture. In January 1975, the countercultural Ann Arbor Sun newspaper held a "Win a Pound of Colombian" giveaway contest of marijuana. Meanwhile, John Sinclair ran a local, pro-legalization radio program entitled Toke Time on Ann Arbor's WNRZ.

== Tightening the marijuana law in 1990 ==
During the 1980s, pressure grew from Ann Arbor Republicans to eliminate the city's lenient marijuana city-charter section. In a 1983 referendum, Ann Arbor voters rejected a proposed repeal of the section, with 61.7 percent of voters opposing the proposed tightening of marijuana codes. By the late 1980s, however, moderate GOP mayor Gerald D. Jernigan was calling the marijuana code an "embarrassment" to the city. In January 1990, the city council approved holding a referendum on increased penalties for possession, use, or sale of marijuana. In the resulting referendum, held in April 1990, 53 percent of voters agreed to amend Section 16.2 of the city charter with heightened penalties, raising the fine from $5 to $25 for a first offense, $50 for a second offense, and $100 or more for further offenses. The offense, however, remained a civil infraction rather than a misdemeanor or felony.

In the same election, using a tactic modeled on the city's original $5 marijuana law, voters approved a charter amendment intended to protect access to abortion in Ann Arbor if it ever became illegal in the state of Michigan. Voters mandated that, should abortion ever become illegal, a city ordinance would come into force under which abortion would be punishable in Ann Arbor solely by a $5 fine. Local judges would thus have the ability to assess the $5 fine rather than any more punitive state penalties. Crafted as the state legislature debated increased restrictions on abortion in Michigan, including the adoption of a parental-consent bill, the measure declared the city a "zone of reproductive freedom." The legality of the charter amendment remains unclear, since it has never been tested.

One local activist expressed disappointment with the voters' marijuana decision, telling USA Today: "The people were clearly pro-choice on abortion, and I expected them to be pro-choice on marijuana as well." However, even with the new fine, possession of small amounts of the substance remained largely decriminalized in Ann Arbor, since the penalty continued to consist only of a civil-infraction ticket similar to a traffic fine. Indeed, the Ann Arbor Observer reported in 2012 that assistant city attorney Bob West could remember "only two times in the last five years that possession of non-medical marijuana has resulted even in a formal court hearing—and then only because the users contested tickets received under the city’s lenient marijuana law."

== Medical-marijuana referendum of 2004 ==
On November 2, 2004, voters in Ann Arbor approved the Ann Arbor Medical Marijuana Initiative authored by city resident Rich Birkett. This ballot initiative amended Section 16.2 of the city charter to allow the growing and use of marijuana for medical purposes. The measure also capped fines for the third and subsequent offenses for non-medical uses or sale at $100. The measure passed with 74 percent approval among voters. The Ann Arbor initiative was only one of several similar measures on local and state ballots that day: Columbia, Missouri, another college town, approved a similar law on medical marijuana, as did the state of Montana, while Oregon voters rejected an initiative to loosen its existing medical-marijuana program, and Alaska voters rejected total decriminalization of marijuana possession.

However, what had been a relatively uncontroversial measure during the election proved controversial following its passage. Shortly after its approval, the Ann Arbor city attorney Steve Postema characterized the initiative as "unenforceable," citing its conflicts with federal and state law. Likewise, city police chief Dan Oates announced that his police force would disregard it and continue normal enforcement practices. Activists who had worked to put the initiative on the ballot quickly expressed their outrage. But since medical-marijuana users in Ann Arbor are very rarely prosecuted, and because the penalty for first-time possession remains a $25 civil-infraction fine, both the 2004 ballot measure itself and Oates's subsequent statements on enforcement may prove to be more symbolic than substantive.

== Michigan Medical Marijuana Act of 2008 ==
In November 2008, Michigan voters passed the Michigan Medical Marijuana Act. The new state law supports the Ann Arbor City charter by offering protection from state law enforcement for qualifying patients and their assigned primary caregivers under the law that took effect on April 4, 2009. Under the law, a patient with a qualifying condition and a signed statement from an attending physician, can register for an identification card under the Michigan Department of Community Health managed program for legal medical marijuana use in Michigan. After registration, the patient and primary caregiver can legally be in possession of marijuana according to State law. The primary caregiver may provide assistance for using medical marijuana or even be assigned responsibility for cultivating the patient's legally protected maximum of 12 marijuana plants, for a fee.

Even though the legal use of medical marijuana was allowed for in the Ann Arbor City Charter, it was still illegal in the State of Michigan, allowing for arrest by state police and other state law enforcement agencies. With this new protection under the Michigan state law, the only remaining threat to a registered patient or caregiver in Ann Arbor is from the untested nature of the new state law and the acts of the D.E.A and other federal law enforcement agencies.

== In popular culture ==
Graham Nash's "Prison Song" from his 1974 album, Wild Tales, references Ann Arbor's lenient marijuana laws with the chorus:
Kids in Texas smoking grass,
Ten year sentence comes to pass
Misdemeanor in Ann Arbor,
Ask the judges why?

== See also ==
- Decriminalization of marijuana in the United States
- Legal history of marijuana in the United States
- Hash Bash
- Human Rights Party (United States)
