= Eric Jackson (journalist) =

American journalist (born 1952)

Eric Jackson (born 1952 in Colón, Panama) is a politician, journalist, and radio talk show host. He is the chief editor of The Panama News and host of the Wappin' Radio Show, both of which are made in Antón, Panama.

== History ==
Jackson was born in Colón, Panama, on December 29, 1952, where he lived with his family in the Panama Canal Zone until after his father's death, when his family moved to Bloomfield Hills, Michigan, in June 1966.

He became a radical activist, dropping out of high school and joining Motor City SDS Weathermen in 1969 and later living in Yippie communes. In 1971, Jackson got into trouble with the law for destroying a Marine recruiter's literature table in protest against the Vietnam War. As a result, he spent 30 days in jail and was ordered to go back to school by a judge.

As Jackson did not have a high school diploma, he was admitted as a special student to Washtenaw Community College, where he took computer programming and black studies courses. Later he transferred to Eastern Michigan University and earned a Bachelor of Science in Political Science and History.

After graduation, he went on to study law at the Detroit College of Law, where he received his Juris Doctor.

After spending about 28 years in the United States, he returned to Panama in 1994 to cover that year's Panamanian election campaign, and later that year became the founding editor of The Panama News.

== Public office ==
While Jackson was in Michigan, he became involved with the Human Rights Party and in 1974 was elected to the Ypsilanti, Michigan, city council! In 1976 he was re-elected to the position.

He was also elected as a Democratic precinct delegate eight times and was appointed as a member of the Ypsilanti Building Code Board of Appeals by both Democratic and Republican mayors.

== Literature ==
While in Panama, Jackson started working for The Panama News, an English-language newspaper, that was in printed form at the time. The paper went on to become the online version of The Panama News.

In 2000, Jackson released a book entitled, 9°N. The book's title derives from the approximate latitude of Panama.

== The Panama News ==
The English reading community in Panama had been on a steady decline after the closing of the US Army bases, making it hard for an English newspaper to survive in a country where the main language is Spanish.

The Panama News started out as a small English newspaper that catered to a small group, and as more and more of the hard-copy newspapers were dying out, The Panama News launched its own website in hopes of recovering some of its readership, thus taking the newspaper to a place where it could be reached from anywhere in the world.
