= Kathy Kozachenko =

American politician (born 1953)

- Kozachenko in January 1973

Ann Arbor City Council, Second Ward (Michigan)
- In office 1974–1976
- Preceded by: Nancy Wechsler (HR)
- Succeeded by: Earl W. Greene (D)

Personal details
- Born: 1953 (age 72–73) Alexandria, Virginia, U.S.
- Party: Human Rights Party
- Education: University of Michigan

Kathleen Kozachenko (born 1953) is an American lesbian politician who was the first openly LGBT candidate to successfully run for political office in the United States. Kozachenko ran on the ticket of the Human Rights Party (HRP), the local, left-wing third party, which had already succeeded in winning two Ann Arbor, Michigan, council seats in 1972.

== Biography ==
Born in Alexandria, Virginia, Kozachenko moved around during her youth. From Toledo, Ohio, she would eventually make it to Plymouth, Michigan. She joined the Human Rights Party (HRP) in the early 1970s. Kozachenko is of Ukrainian descent.

Kozachenko was an out student at the University of Michigan, where she received support for her progressive agenda, which included a fine of no more than five dollars for possession of small amounts of marijuana. Another part of her platform included "a ceiling on the amount of profit a landlord could make from rents on a building".

Running solely against a liberal Democrat, the 21-year-old Kozachenko was elected to the Ann Arbor City Council on April 2, 1974. She won the seat "representing the city's second ward by fifty-two votes".

Kozachenko's HRP predecessors on the city council, Nancy Wechsler and Jerry DeGrieck, had both come out during their first and only terms on the city council, thus becoming the first openly LGBT public-office holders in the United States; however, neither Wechsler nor DeGrieck ran for office as an openly lesbian/gay individual.

== Political career ==
On April 2, 1974, she was elected to the Ann Arbor City Council, representing the Second Ward. Her win was important because she became the first openly lesbian/gay candidate to successfully run for and win public office in the United States.

During her two-year term (1974–1976), Kozachenko focused on progressive issues central to the HRP platform. Her campaign focused on enforcement of Ann Arbor’s Human Rights Ordinance, which protected gay and lesbian residents from discrimination in housing and employment. She also supported workers rights, the United Farm Workers boycott, and the increasing of funding for social service programs. She continued to be a vocal promoter of economic justice even though her campaign for rent control eventually failed at the elections.

In her second year on the council, Kozachenko had the swing vote. She utilized this position to negotiate increased funding for social services. She also attempted to introduce legislation to overturn a law she believed was used to unfairly arrest student protesters, but the bill did not pass.
