= Spectrum Center (community center) =

LGBT-oriented student affairs office at the University of Michigan

- Formation: September 1971; 55 years ago
- Type: Student Affairs Office
- Location: Michigan Union, 3020
- Region served: Ann Arbor, Michigan
- Director: Jesse Beal
- Parent organization: University of Michigan
- Website: spectrumcenter.umich.edu

The Spectrum Center is an office at the University of Michigan in Ann Arbor that is dedicated to providing education, outreach, and advocacy for the lesbian, gay, bisexual, transgender, queer, and allied (LGBTQA) community. Since the organizations' creation in 1971, the Spectrum Center's mission statement has been to "enrich the campus experience and develop students as individuals and as members of the LGBTQA community." The organization achieves this through student-centered education, outreach, advocacy and support.

== History ==
Initially, on March 17, 1970, following the creation of the Detroit Gay Liberation Movement a few weeks earlier, both students and members of the larger community came together to initiate the University of Michigan chapter of the Gay Liberation Front (GLF), seeking to battle stereotypes of gay people, fighting homophobic prejudice, and invalidating the mental illness model of homosexuality.

After increased pressure from both the GLF and Michigan students, the University established a one-room office in September 1971, provided funding for 2 quarter-time positions to be filled by a lesbian and gay male and a small budget, to deal with gay and lesbian issues on campus. Jim Toy and Cindy Gair, a leader of the Radicalesbians an offshoot of GLF, were hired to fill the available positions, titled Human Sexuality Advocates, at the University of Michigan's "Human Sexuality Office" (HSO). This achievement was monumental, in that it was officially the first staff office for queer students in an institution of higher learning in the United States. Following the establishment of the office, Jim and Cindy set up a system of peer-advisors to speak with the counseling office and aid in training them how to best counsel lesbian and gay individuals. By early 1973, the office had formed its first Speakers' Bureau, which consisted of gay and lesbian students and members from the community, and worked with other student groups, in order to educate students concerning gay and lesbian issues. By 1972, the office had made one class presentation; today the Spectrum Center provides eighty or more workshops to classes and seminars each year.

In January 1977, the advocacy positions were upgraded to half-time positions and then again in 1987, when they received full-time appointments; both changes were primarily the result of advocacy for the office by students, staff, faculty, and religious leaders from the campus and Ann Arbor communities. During the 1980s, the University of Michigan administration finally agreed to allow identity terms in the office name and the Office of Human Sexuality became the University of Michigan "Lesbian & Gay Male Programs Office". In addition, the 1980s brought about increased outreach and services to bisexual people and people of color in support of their concerns.

In 1994, the University administration reduced the two positions to one position, with positions for support staff being added over the years. During this time, Jim Toy stepped down and Ronnie Sanlo was hired as Interim Director. Within a month, Ronnie conducted a CAS assessment for the office. As a vision for the office was being developed, the office added bisexuality to the title to acknowledge inclusion of more sexual minorities at the University, thus becoming the "Lesbian-Gay-Bisexual Programs Office". In 1995, the office began to learn more about transgender issues and began to include these issues in office education programs. In addition, the office expanded the speakers bureau to include allies, founded Lavender Graduation, and expanded the title of the office to include transgender individuals, becoming the "UM Office of Lesbian, Gay, Bisexual & Transgender Affairs".

In 1997, the central goals for the office were to increase transgender inclusion and education concerning transgender issues, increase education on campus in general, making the education coordinator position a full-time job and increased inclusion for students of color. During that period of time Frederic MacDonald-Dennis held the Interim Director position and continued the development and expansion of various programs.

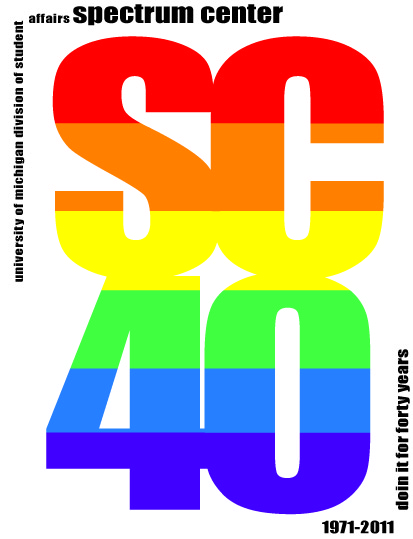
40th Anniversary Logo (2011)

Thanks to MacDonald's work, the University created a gender-identity working group that focused on gaps in services for transgender individuals, made recommendations for inclusion, and began to examine the current climate on campus for LGBT people. In addition, Transforum was established by students as a group for alumni, students, & faculty of the University of Michigan that provides discussion, support, and resources and is committed to advancing the equal rights, health care access, and safety of transgender people. During this time, there was an increase in the number of participants, speaking engagements and training in the speakers bureau, as well as the development of Color Splash, an event for LGBT people of color and a Coming Out Group.

In 2005, the office developed the Ally Training Program, which educates people how to be better allies to the LGBT community. In the fall of that year, Jackie Simpson took over as office Director and began the process to change the office's name to a more inclusive name: the "Spectrum Center".

In 2011, the Spectrum Center celebrated this important milestone in its history. In February, the University of Michigan hosted the annual MBLGTACC conference- the largest queer college conference in the country. And in November, the Spectrum Center hosted an "alumni weekend", in which past and present students and friends of the Spectrum Center gathered together to celebrate the past and plan for the future.

In recent years, the office has collaborated with University Housing to help them develop a gender-neutral housing policy. In addition, the office is supporting efforts by students for increased inclusion of gender-identity and an amendment to include "gender identity" and "gender expression" in the University bylaws. The office continues to focus on concerns for civil rights, addressing concerns and the inclusion of students on campus and looks forward to continued progress and transformation of the office towards the betterment of the LGBT student's college and life experience.

== Programs ==
=== Education & Training ===
In March 2005, the University of Michigan joined more than 140 other colleges and universities by implementing an Ally Training Program through the Spectrum Center. Ally Program participants attend a one-day, six-hour training designed to strengthen their ability to serve as allies to lesbian, gay, bisexual, transgender, and queer students, staff, and faculty at the University of Michigan. Spectrum also has a Speakers Bureau program where speakers share their experiences and growth, thereby promoting knowledge, compassion, and understanding about LGBTQ identities, issues and concerns.

=== Support ===
Spectrum Center runs two coming out programs: GPS, and closed coming out groups. The GPS Program provides students with Guidance to helpful information and resources, Perspective of a fellow student who has experience with coming out, and Support for coming out. Coming out groups are closed and confidential ten-week discussion and support groups which help participants explore a variety of coming-out issues. Spectrum also offers three support groups relating to gender identity: Partners of transfolk, Gender Explorers, and Mgender.

=== Outreach ===
Spectrum Center holds many events throughout the year to celebrate and recognize National Coming Out Day, Transgender Day of Remembrance, Celebrate Bisexuality Day, and Pride week. Spectrum also organizes an annual "Lavender Graduation" which recognizes queer and allied graduates of the University of Michigan.

== See also ==
- LGBT history in Michigan
- List of LGBT rights organizations
- University of Michigan
- List of LGBT community centers in the United States
- LGBT student centers
