= Jim Toy =

American LGBTQ activist (1930–2022)

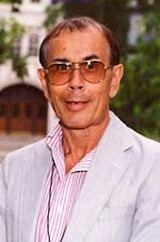
- Born: James Willis Toy; April 29, 1930; New York City, U.S.
- Died: January 1, 2022 (aged 91); Ann Arbor, Michigan, U.S.
- Education: Denison University; University of Michigan
- Occupations: US lesbian, gay, bisexual and transgender (LGBT) activist and educator
- Known for: Gay Liberation Front, Lesbian-Gay Male Programs Office at the University of Michigan, Episcopal Diocese of Michigan Commission on Homosexuality

James Willis Toy (April 29, 1930 – January 1, 2022) was a long-time American activist and a pioneer for LGBT rights in Michigan.

Toy earned his B.A. at Denison University in 1951. He graduated with a master's degree in Clinical Social Work from the University of Michigan and served as a pro bono counselor and therapist. At Michigan, Toy helped establish the Human Sexuality Office in 1971, and was later affiliated with the campus Office of Institutional Equity.

In June 2001, Denison awarded Toy with the Alumni Citation, the school's highest alumni honor, and in 2013, he was featured as an early LGBT alumnus in the college's history.

== Michigan activism ==
Toy identified as being gay during his speech at an anti-Vietnam War rally in Kennedy Square, Detroit, in April 1970. At the rally, he was representing the Detroit Gay Liberation Front, of which he was a founding member.

=== Ann Arbor and University of Michigan ===
Toy was a founding member of the Ann Arbor Gay Liberation Front. In 1971, he helped establish the Human Sexuality Office (HSO) at the University of Michigan in Ann Arbor, Michigan. The HSO was the first staffed office at an institution of higher learning in the United States, and presumably the first of its kind in the world, to address and support sexual minorities. Toy served as its Co-Coordinator, and Gay Male advocate, from 1971 until 1994. The HSO, now named the Spectrum Center, has named its library in Toy's honor. The Jim Toy Library (JTL) currently hosts a collection of over 1500 titles and supports LGBTQA student development by exposing students to, and engaging them in the rich cultural, social, historical, psychological, political, and relational aspects of LGBTQ people, identities, experiences, and communities.

In 1972, Toy co-authored the first official "Lesbian-Gay Pride Week Proclamation" by a U.S. governing body, the Ann Arbor City Council. The same year, he co-authored the city's non-discrimination policy on sexual orientation. He participated (1973–1993) in the successful efforts to amend the University of Michigan's non-discrimination bylaw to include sexual orientation as a protected category. He engaged in the campaigns to create and retain the City of Ypsilanti's non-discrimination ordinance (1997–1998). In 1999, Toy and Dr. Sandra Cole, former Director of Michigan Medicine's Comprehensive Gender Services Program, wrote the language of Ann Arbor's non-discrimination policy regarding gender identity. With many others, Toy advocated successfully (1993–2007) for the amendment of the University of Michigan's non-discrimination bylaw so as to include gender identity and gender expression as protected categories.

=== Episcopal Diocese of Michigan ===
In 1971, Bishop Richard Emrich of the Episcopal Diocese of Michigan appointed Toy a founding member of the Diocesan Commission on Homosexuality. The group published the Report & Recommendations of the Commission on Homosexuality (1973), one of the earliest church documents in the United States to support the concerns of lesbigay people.

From 1975, Toy served as the Secretary of the Diocesan Church & Society Committee. He was a co-author of the Diocesan Human Sexuality Curriculum and was Secretary of the Diocesan Committee on Transgender/Bisexual/Lesbian/Gay/Concerns.

He was a founding board member of the Oasis TBLG Outreach Ministry of the Diocese and served as the secretary.

On Sunday, October 27, 2019, he was seated as Canon Honorary at the Cathedral Church of St. Paul, Detroit, at an Evensong for the Feast of Saints Simon and Jude.

=== LGBT health and wellness ===
Toy co-founded the Ann Arbor Gay Hotline in 1972 and served as its Coordinator and Trainer until 1985.

In 1986, he helped found the Wellness Networks/Huron Valley, now known as Unified: HIV Health and Beyond. He became the first Co-Coordinator of HIV/AIDS Education for the Episcopal Diocese of Michigan in 1987. He served as a certified Pre- & Post-Test HIV/AIDS Counselor and as a support group facilitator and volunteer trainer for Unified: HIV Health and Beyond. He was a founding member of the City of Ann Arbor HIV/AIDS Task Force and of two four-county HIV/AIDS prevention and resource-provision groups.

=== Additional organizations ===
Toy was a founding member of the Washtenaw County LGBT Retirement Center Task Force, PFLAG/Ann Arbor, GLSEN/Ann Arbor-Ypsilanti Area, Washtenaw Rainbow Action Project (WRAP), Transgender Advocacy Project (TAP), American Friends Service Committee (AFSC) Inclusive Justice Program, Washtenaw Faith Action Network, Ypsilanti Human Rights PAC, Ypsilanti Rainbow Neighbors, and the Out Loud Chorus (1995). He was a former executive board member of Guild House ("A Campus Ministry").

He was a trained mediator and trainer for the American Friends Service Committee Inclusive Justice Program's non-violent-dialogue training ("LARA"). He was a member of the Program Committee of the AFSC Michigan's Inclusive Justice Program. He served on Equality Michigan's Board of Advisors and the WikiQueer Global Advisory Board. He was a founding member of the gay Baroque trio, Rosetta Stoned, & The Higheroglyphics.

== Acknowledgements ==
The Washtenaw Rainbow Action Project (WRAP) is a local Ann Arbor resource center that exists to provide information, education, social events, and advocacy by and for the Queer and Ally community in the Washtenaw County area. In his honor, the center was renamed the Jim Toy Community Center (JTCC) in 2010.

His archives are housed in the James W. Toy Papers at the University of Michigan's Bentley Historical Library. He was included in the Gallery of the LGBT Religious Archives Network (LGBT-RAN).

== Personal life and death ==
Toy was born in New York City on April 29, 1930. He died in Ann Arbor on January 1, 2022, at the age of 91.

== See also ==
- LGBT history in Michigan
