= Nancy Wechsler =

American activist, politician, and writer

- Wechsler in September 1973

Ann Arbor City Council, Second Ward
- In office 1972–1974
- Preceded by: Robert E. Weaver (R)
- Succeeded by: Kathy Kozachenko (HR)

Personal details
- Party: Human Rights Party
- Education: University of Michigan
- Profession: Activist, politician, writer

Nancy Wechsler is an activist, writer, and former member of the Ann Arbor City Council, where she came out as a lesbian while serving her term. Elected to the City Council alongside fellow Human Rights Party candidate Jerry DeGrieck, both Wechsler and DeGrieck came out while serving, and are typically cited as the first openly LGBT elected officials in the United States.

== Ann Arbor City Council ==
Wechsler and Jerry DeGrieck were elected to the Ann Arbor City Council as members of the Human Rights Party on April 3, 1972. Political observers did not believe the third party had much chance of winning any seats, but the party's liberal platform appealed to young voters and beat university professors running as Democrats in the 1st and 2nd wards. At the time of the election, Wechsler was 22, a recent University of Michigan graduate, and an employee of a local college bookstore.

During her time in office, Wechsler worked together with DeGrieck to champion numerous progressive policies. These included banning discrimination in housing, employment, supporting efforts for prison inmates to unionize and public accommodations on the basis of sexual preference, formally declaring a Gay Pride Week in Ann Arbor, and decriminalizing marijuana possession at the local level.

In 1973, while serving on the council, Wechsler came out as a lesbian and DeGrieck as a gay man in response to an anti-LGBT incident at a local restaurant. The incident in question involved Wechsler and several lesbian friends being kicked out of the Rubaiyat when they were seen slow dancing and kissing.

In 1974, rather than seek re-election, Wechsler moved to Boston, Massachusetts where she went on to become a writer and photographer for the Gay Community News among other publications. She also worked at political organizations including the Resist Foundation and the American Friends Service Committee.

Out lesbian Kathy Kozachenko was elected to fill Wechsler's seat on the council, becoming the first openly LGBT politician to win an election in the United States.

== Personal life ==
Wechsler is a native of Brooklyn, New York. Before transferring to University of Michigan where she majored in General Studies, she attended a year of college at Colorado College in Colorado Springs.
