= Alliance of Queer and Ally Students =

LGBT organization at Michigan State University

- Alliance of Queer and Ally Students logo
- Founded: Early 1970s
- Purpose: LGBT and straight ally students of Michigan State University
- Location: East Lansing, Michigan
- Region served: Michigan State University
- Website: http://msualliance.weebly.com/
- Formerly called: Gay liberation movement

The Alliance of Queer and Ally Students is a student organization for LGBT and straight ally students of Michigan State University. One of the oldest Lesbian, Gay, Bisexual and Transgender groups in Michigan, it began in the early 1970s. First dubbed the Michigan State Gay Liberation Movement (GLM), some sources state the organization began in 1970, while others state it began in 1972.

On March 7, 1972, the city council of East Lansing, Michigan passed an LGBT anti-discrimination ordinance, after petitioning from the GLM. Since then, the group has advocated for policy changes on campus, such as policies around preferred names, gender neutral housing, and gender neutral bathrooms.

== About ==
=== Ten Point Plan ===
Found on the Alliance’s Twitter page, the group put together a ten-point plan on inclusion of diversity, bettering equality, and inclusion of all students. The list reads:

1. We demand the revitalization of the Office of Cultural & Academic Transitions office, its programming, and the Intercultural Aide program by Fall 2020.

2. We demand a mandatory general education course for all students on race, ethnicity, racism, and gender be implemented into curriculum by Fall 2020.

3. We demand cultural, racial and religious sensitivity training for all University faculty, staff, contractors, and police officers as outlined by a student selected group by Fall 2020.

4. We demand that the Black & Minority faculty and staff demographics in each department reflect the current national demographics by December 2021.

5. We demand that Michigan State University become registered as a sanctuary school.

6. We demand the addition of reflection rooms in all campus neighborhoods.

7. We demand that a freestanding multicultural building be placed on campus.

8. We demand that Michigan State University increase the number of gender inclusive housing options and restrooms on campus by 75% by the start of the Fall 2020 semester.

9. We demand that the flat-rate tuition price be dropped to the price of 12 credit hours by the start of the Winter 2020 semester.

10. We demand that Student Affairs create a designated fund for the Council of Progressive Students (COPS).

== History ==
When first registered as a student organization, the group called itself the Michigan State University Gay Liberation Movement. The name of the group was changed several times over the decades, reflecting the political and social context of the era. The 1980’s saw several adjustments: to the MSU Gay Liberation Council, then the MSU Lesbian/Gay Council, and finally, the Alliance of Lesbian-Bi-Gay Students. The early 1990’s saw the formal inclusion of transgender individuals into the group, which then became the Alliance of LBGT students. In 2005, the group became the Alliance of Lesbian, Bisexual, Gay, Transgendered, and Straight Ally Students. They adopted Alliance of Queer and Ally Students in 2010.

Through the 1980’s and the mid-1990’s, the Alliance provided opportunities for MSU students, faculty and staff, and people from the surrounding metropolitan area, to meet, learn, and organize. A variety of student-initiated support and discussion groups created safe places for LGBT individuals to share their experiences and build community. These weekly meetings included the Gay Support Group, Lesbian Support Group, and the Coming Out Support group. They were facilitated by one consistent individual, usually representative of the participants. The support and discussion groups attracted many members. The Coming Out Support Group had grown so large and diverse that by 1991, two facilitators, a male and a female, led the group, which continued to expand until it was divided and met on a second day.

The Alliance also provided local and regional schools, governmental units, hospitals, churches, non-profits, and even other colleges and universities, as well as MSU classes, dormitories, fraternities and sororities, among others, with LBGT+ individuals for Panel Q&A discussions. Panels consisted of four members, usually MSU students trained by their peers for the events. The Alliance would occasionally pair with other related groups, such as PFLAG (Parents and Friends of Lesbians and Gays) and MOHR (the Michigan Organization for Human Rights), to add their perspectives to the panels. Over the period, thousands of people from the Mid-and-Southern Michigan areas were afforded an opportunity to meet openly LGBT+ people, ask questions, and discuss issues.

The Alliance organized on-campus protests and marches, participated in the annual Lansing Pride Parade, and facilitated MSU student, faculty, and staff participation in special events, such as the 1993 March on Washington. Alliance members conducted local and regional media outreach, and provided representatives to speak to journalists from newspaper, radio, and television news providers.

Throughout the 1980’s and 90’s, the Council, and then the Alliance, maintained an ongoing commitment to HIV/AIDS education, awareness, and prevention. Effective therapies for controlling HIV were still years away, making HIV/AIDS prevention an urgent priority. Members provided free AIDS awareness and education materials, condoms and dental dams, etc., hosted informational seminars and member trainings, and made themselves available to answer questions and provide referrals across the spectrum of the services and events they were involved with. Michigan State University itself played a crucial role by consistently providing the funds necessary to support these efforts.

=== Engagement with Civil Rights ===
The group has a history with its members engaging in protests and coming into conflict with local and University authorities over LGBT rights. Tim Retzloff once conducted several oral history recordings, and stated later that the MSU GLM had participated in protests against the Vietnam War. These recorded interviews were with people who had been active in Michigan’s historical gay liberation actions and organizations. One man interviewed, Leonard Graff, talked about a blockade formed on the intersection of Grand River and Michigan “for days”. The recordings also revealed that MSU had once barred the GLM from hanging a banner on a local street for Gay Pride Week.

=== First Anti-Discriminatory Ordinance ===
On March 7, 1972, the city council of East Lansing, Michigan, passed an ordinance against discrimination based on sexual orientation when hiring employees, stating that they would hire the best applicant to fill the job, “without regard to race, color, creed, national origin, sex or homosexuality.”

== Notable Members ==
Don Gaudard - A member of the GLM in 1994, he helped to put a stop to traffic on the intersection of Grand River and Michigan by pretending to drop his contact lens.

Leonard Graff – Was interviewed, gave a history of the blockade formed to protest American involvement in the Vietnam war.

Tim Retzloff – Currently teaching history and LGBTQ studies at Michigan University, interviewed and recorded several past members of the GLM.

=== Current E-Board ===
Chairperson – Mady Gildea

Vice Chairperson – Sean Wolski

Office Manager – Emily Pelky

ASMSU Representative – Colin Wiebrecht

RHA Representative – Katrine Weismantle

Public Relations Coordinator – Sydney Cronkhite

Conference Coordinator – Jenna B.
