= Jim Dressel =

American politician (1943–1992)

Member of the Michigan House of Representatives from the 95th district
- In office January 1, 1979 – December 31, 1984
- Preceded by: Melvin DeStigter

Personal details
- Born: October 14, 1943 Holland, Michigan
- Died: March 24, 1992 (aged 48) Lansing, Michigan
- Party: Republican
- Education: University of Michigan
- Occupation: Air Force pilot

Captain James K. Dressel (October 14, 1943 – March 24, 1992) was an Air Force pilot, and a Michigan politician in the 1970s and early 1980s. Although he was a conservative Republican, in 1983 he co-sponsored the state's first bill to protect gay and lesbian people from discrimination in employment and housing. He was profiled in Randy Shilts' book Conduct Unbecoming in the chapter "Heroes".

== Biography ==
Dressel was born in Holland, Michigan, to German and Dutch parents, and raised in the United Methodist Church. He graduated from Hope College in 1967, then enlisted in the air force. Beginning in 1970, he served a tour of duty in the Vietnam War, piloting fighter jets and bombing enemy supply runs from a base in Thailand, receiving the Distinguished Flying Cross and other decorations.

Following his military service, he became a member of the Air National Guard and began a career in politics as a Republican. He was elected to the Ottawa County Commission, and served as county treasurer before being elected to the Michigan House of Representatives in 1978, serving the 95th District. Although he was a conservative Goldwater Republican, he cooperated with Democratic legislators on programs to aid the city of Detroit and other practical issues facing the state.

He surprised his constituents in October 1983 by co-sponsoring House Bill 5000, an amendment to the state's Elliott-Larsen Civil Rights Act to prohibit discrimination based on "sexual orientation" in employment and housing. A 40-year-old bachelor, he was subsequently speculated to be gay, but refused at the time to confirm or deny it, citing the principle he was trying to demonstrate: that it shouldn't matter. He was soundly defeated in the Republican primary for re-election in 1984, by a candidate he had easily out-polled in the previous primary.

He was later somewhat more open about his homosexuality, and became active in advocating civil rights protection for gay and lesbian people, including a stint leading the Michigan Organization for Human Rights. He died of AIDS-related pneumonia in 1992, at the age of 48. The Michigan Legislature passed a resolution honoring him upon his death.
