= Daryl Justin Finizio =

American lawyer

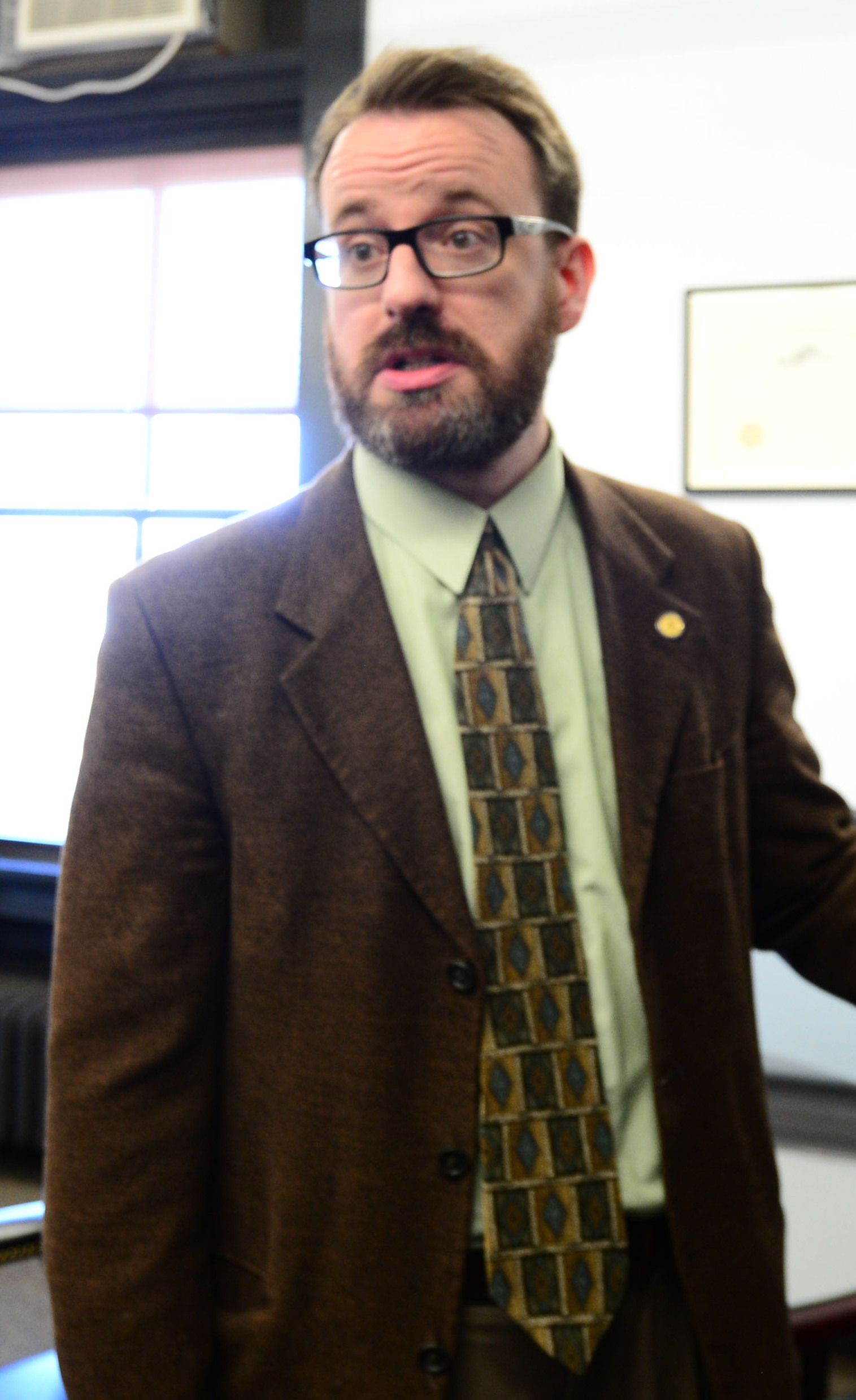

Mayor of New London, Connecticut
- In office December 5, 2011 – December 5, 2015

Personal details
- Born: July 20, 1977 (age 49) Westerly, Rhode Island, U.S.
- Party: Democratic
- Education: University of Rhode Island (BA); New York University (MPA); Roger Williams University (JD); Northeastern University (MS)
- Profession: attorney, politician

Daryl Justin Finizio (born July 20, 1977) is an American politician, and was the first strong mayor of New London, Connecticut. As a Democrat, he won the mayoral election in November 2011 with 46% of the vote in a 6-way race (an almost 2:1 margin to the next highest vote getter).

== Early life, education, and career ==
Finizio was born in Westerly, Rhode Island. An alumnus of the University of Rhode Island, Finizio served as the first openly gay student body President, as well as a student delegate to the Rhode Island Board of Governors for Higher Education. During his time at URI, he was the recipient of the prestigious Harry S. Truman Scholarship, awarded to students who demonstrate leadership potential and a commitment to public service.

After graduating from URI, Finizio went on to attend the Robert F. Wagner Graduate School of Public Service at New York University, where he received a master's degree in public administration. At this time, he also worked for the New York City Council as a criminal justice policy analyst. In 2005, Finizio received his J.D. from Roger Williams University. He is currently a licensed attorney in both the State and Federal courts in Rhode Island and Connecticut, as well as being licensed to practice in front of the United States Supreme Court.

In 2006, Finizio returned to Westerly, Rhode Island, and won election to the Westerly Town Council. While serving on the town council, he received a full merit fellowship to attend Northeastern University for a PhD program in the Department of Law and Public Policy. While studying and teaching at Northeastern University, Finizio moved to New London, Connecticut, where he was elected mayor in 2011. In 2015, he lost the Democratic primary to current mayor Michael Passero. In 2021, he declared his intention to run for the Connecticut State Senate to replace retiring Republican senator Paul Formica.

== Personal life ==
Finizio was invited to attend the White House LGBTQ Pride Month Receptions in 2013 and 2014.

In 2013, he was a recipient of the Southeastern Connecticut "40 Under Forty" award.

== See also ==
- Endorsements for the Democratic Party presidential primaries, 2016 - Bernie Sanders
- List of the First LGBT Holders of Political Offices in the United States - Connecticut
