= Jerry DeGrieck =

American public health official

- DeGrieck in September 1973

Ann Arbor City Council, First Ward
- In office 1972–1974
- Preceded by: John P. Kirscht (D)
- Succeeded by: Colleen S. McGee (D)

Personal details
- Party: Human Rights Party
- Education: University of Michigan
- Profession: Public health and public policy

Gerald C. DeGrieck is a public health manager and policy advisor in Seattle, Washington. He and Nancy Wechsler served together on the Ann Arbor City Council, 1972–1974, while they were graduate students at the University of Michigan. In 1973, they simultaneously became the first openly gay elected officials in the United States.

== Ann Arbor City Council ==
DeGrieck and Wechsler were elected to the Ann Arbor City Council as members of the Human Rights Party on April 3, 1972. Political observers did not believe the third party had much chance of winning any seats, but the party's radical platform appealed to young voters and beat university professors running as Democrats in the 1st and 2nd wards.

At the time of their election, DeGrieck and Wechsler were 22-year-old history students at University of Michigan, the first student members of the city council. In 1973, DeGrieck and Wechsler became the first openly gay male and openly lesbian elected officials in the United States when they came out together, at a press conference held in response to a homophobic incident at a local restaurant.

After finishing his term in 1974, DeGrieck moved to Seattle, Washington, where he went on to be active in LGBTQ politics and worked in a variety of health and human services positions in local government. He eventually became a public health manager and policy advisor to the City of Seattle. He retired in 2021 from his Deputy Division Director position in the King County Department of Public Health.

== Personal life ==
DeGrieck had a daughter, born in 1981, and a son, born in 1990, with lesbian friends, and coparented with his long-term male partner. He has not sought elected political office since his term on the Ann Arbor City Council, but has remained politically active in LGBTQ politics and progressive causes.
