= Human Rights Party (United States) =

American political party

- A Human Rights Party button
- Founders: Zolton Ferency
- Founded: 1970
- Dissolved: 1977
- Merged into: Socialist Party of Michigan
- Ideology: Social justice Social democracy Democratic socialism Youth politics
- Political position: Left-wing

The Human Rights Party (HRP) was a left-wing political party that existed in Michigan from 1970 to 1977. The party achieved electoral success in Ann Arbor and Ypsilanti. It eventually expanded to include several other Michigan cities with large student populations. In 1975, the HRP became the Socialist Human Rights Party (SHRP). The party later merged with the Socialist Party of Michigan.

== Origins ==
Ferency in 1978

The organization was established in 1970 under the leadership of Zolton Ferency. It quickly gained strength following the 1971 ratification of the Twenty-sixth Amendment to the Constitution, which gave 18-year-olds the right to vote.

In October 1971, the Radical Independent Party of Ann Arbor, Michigan (RIP), which had been formed by members of the Students for a Democratic Society (SDS), the New University Conference, and local International Socialists (IS), merged with the HRP.

== Ideology ==
The Human Rights Party’s platform included calls for the immediate withdrawal of all U.S. military forces from foreign soil, the end of the ROTC and Selective Service, repeal of laws against homosexuality and prostitution, the closure of all state prisons, and provision of daycare and health care based on ability to pay.

== History ==
=== First campaigns in Ann Arbor ===
Working to gain electoral votes among the city's large population of students at the University of Michigan, the HRP succeeded in electing two candidates to the Ann Arbor city council in 1972; the party successfully defended one of the seats in 1974. Building support through rock concerts, local radio spots, and coverage in the underground press, the HRP won 25 percent of the 30,000 ballots cast in the 1972 Ann Arbor municipal election. The party's victors in the city-council races – Jerry DeGrieck, a history student at the University of Michigan, and Nancy Wechsler, a U-M graduate, both 22 years of age – defeated two professors, both of whom were Democrats, and one of whom was an incumbent member of the City Council. As DeGrieck later noted, the party garnered substantial support not only from students, but also from low-income voters and factory workers. In two other Ann Arbor wards, reported the New York Times, "the Human Rights Party drew off enough votes from the Democratic candidates to help conservative Republicans win." In the next-door city of Ypsilanti, the HRP elected two city council members in 1974, both of whom were re-elected in 1976.

During the 1972 election, the HRP chose a fifteen-year-old Sonia Yaco, an activist affiliated with Youth Liberation of Ann Arbor, as its Ann Arbor school-board candidate. Yaco's demands for a student voice in school governance earned her 1,300 votes as a write-in candidate, or eight percent of the total, and indirectly influenced the establishment of the experimental alternative Community High School later that year. One of the first HRP candidates was Lawrence ("Larry") Pallozola, who unsuccessfully ran for school board in Garden City, Michigan, in the early 1970s.

=== Ann Arbor City Council ===
DeGrieck and Wechsler in October 1972

From April 1972 to April 1973, the two Human Rights representatives were able to significantly influence the decisions of the Ann Arbor city council, since no political party held a majority. In addition to the HRP members, there were five Republicans and four Democrats. During their time on the city council, HRP members successfully pushed for several progressive ordinances, including the city's famously lenient "five-dollar pot law," which had the effect of decriminalizing the possession of small amounts of marijuana for personal use (see Cannabis laws in Ann Arbor, Michigan). In addition, the HRP led a push for a citywide anti-discrimination ordinance, which banned discrimination based on race, national origin, sex, age, and religion. The ordinance was the first of its kind in Michigan. In 1972, the pioneering ordinance was amended to add sexual orientation, and to require affirmative-action measures by city contractors.

On zoning issues, the party worked to restrict the construction of fast-food chains in the city's downtown area. Alongside its electoral work, the HRP put on several protests, supported area workers' strikes, organized city tenants, and aided the anti-war movement. As Nancy Wechsler told the Wall Street Journal, the HRP also fought successfully to set aside federal revenue-sharing dollars for health and child care at a time when "most cities are spending revenue-sharing money for more police cars."

At a joint press conference following a homophobic incident at a local restaurant, both of the 1972 HRP winners, Nancy Wechsler and Jerry DeGrieck, came out as gay and lesbian during their term on city council. Thus, they simultaneously became the first openly lesbian and openly gay elected public officials in the United States. When Wechsler declined to run for reelection in 1974, her seat was won by HRP candidate Kathy Kozachenko. Already publicly known to be a lesbian, she thus became the first openly gay or lesbian candidate to be elected to public office in the United States.

=== Instant-runoff voting in Ann Arbor ===
HRP Ann Arbor mayoral candidate Carol Ernst in March 1975

With the introduction of a strong third party in Ann Arbor, concerns grew among Democrats and HRP supporters that the city's progressive vote would be split, thus allowing Republicans to win offices on pluralities. This scenario came to pass soon after the emergence of the HRP. In 1973, Republican James E. Stephenson won the mayoral office with a plurality, defeating Democratic candidate Franz J. Mogdis and HRP candidate Benita Kaimowitz despite garnering only 47% of the vote. To head off a repeat of this result, the HRP spearheaded a petition campaign to place the Instant-runoff voting (IRV) system on the city ballot in the spring of 1974. Most Democratic and HRP voters supported the proposal, which passed with 52% approval.

In April 1975, during the first (and only) Ann Arbor mayoral race using IRV, the Republican incumbent James E. Stephenson received 49% of the first-choice ballots, leading his Democratic challenger Al Wheeler, who received 40%, and the HRP candidate Carol Ernst with 11%. However, since most HRP voters had ranked Wheeler as their second choice, these votes moved to the Democrat's column, and Wheeler won the election by a slim 121 votes, becoming the city's first African American mayor. The election represented the first use of IRV in a U.S. mayoral contest.

The IRV system survived a court challenge by Republicans, but Ann Arbor voters repealed the system in an April 1976 special election. The IRV system was not again used in a United States election until San Francisco began using a similar system in 2004.

=== Ypsilanti City Council ===
In 1974 the HRP activists in Ypsilanti helped to pass the Ypsilanti Marijuana Initiative, a $5 fine for marijuana use or possession. In the same election, the HRP elected council members Eric Jackson and Harold Baize to their first term of office. Jackson and Baize championed anti-discrimination, fair rental practices, women's rights, and environmental issues. When Ypsilanti police ignored the voter's mandate by enforcing State marijuana laws rather than the Ypsilanti Marijuana Initiative, Jackson and Baize called for an emergency meeting of the city council to deal with the issue. Although most of the other members of the city council boycotted the meeting, hundreds of citizens did not, resulting in a near riot.

=== Demise ===
With the nationwide decline in student activism, the Human Rights Party's power waned in the mid-1970s.

In Ann Arbor, the Democratic-HRP governing coalition lost power in 1973, as Republican James E. Stephenson won the mayoralty and Republicans also took control of seven of the ten council seats. In 1976, the Ann Arbor HRP chapter lost its last remaining city council seat.

In Ypsilanti, HRP city council members Eric Jackson and Harold Baize were re-elected in 1976 and continued their struggles for progressive policies. Following the loss of ballot status for the Michigan HRP, Harold Baize was elected to a third term as a Democrat in 1978. The Ypsilanti HRP changed its name to the Democratic Socialist Caucus and elected other members to the city council as well as electing Peter Murdock as mayor. At one point, the DSC controlled nine of the eleven city council seats as well as the mayor's position. The DSC ceased to exist in 1986.

In 1975, the HRP became the Socialist Human Rights Party (SHRP). In 1977, SHRP merged with the Socialist Party of Michigan. Some members joined the Democratic Party.

Several of the HRP's landmark initiatives, notably the Ann Arbor anti-discrimination ordinance and the lenient municipal marijuana penalties, survive in modified form to this day.

== See also ==
- Cannabis in the United States
