= Barbara Jordan (disambiguation) =

Barbara Jordan (1936–1996) was an American politician and civil rights leader. Jordan has had a number of institutions and pieces of artwork named for her, including:

- Barbara Jordan Career Center
- Barbara Jordan Health Policy Scholars
- Barbara Jordan – Mickey Leland School of Public Affairs
- Statue of Barbara Jordan (Austin–Bergstrom International Airport)
- Statue of Barbara Jordan (University of Texas at Austin)

Barbara Jordan may also refer to:

- Barbara Jordan (poet) (born 1949), American poet
- Barbara Jordan (tennis) (born 1957), American tennis player
- Barbara Jordan (skier), Austrian para-alpine skier
- Barbara Wilson (sprinter), née Jordan, Australian sprinter
