= Paul Mohai =

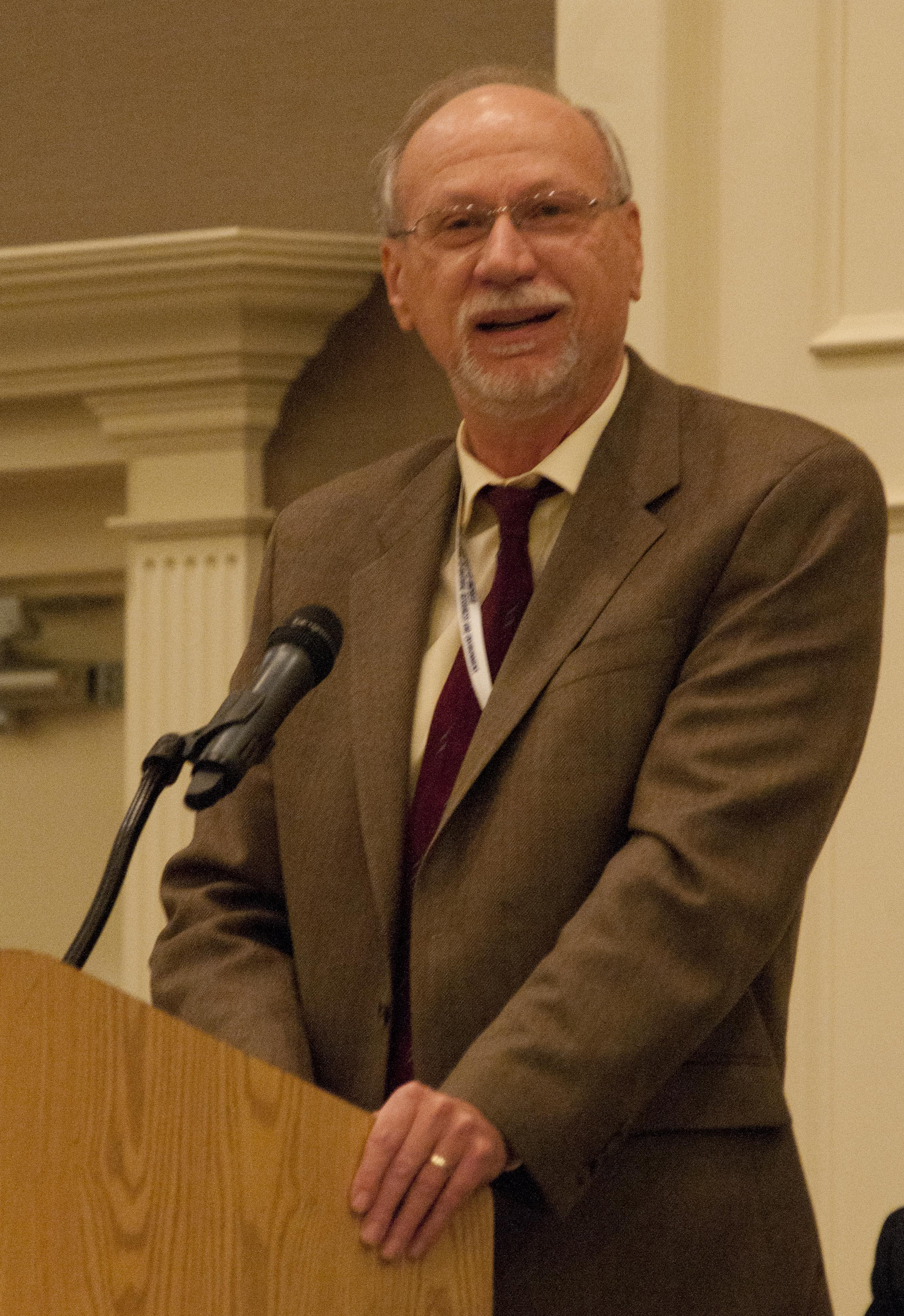
- Mohai in 2012

Academic background
- Education: BA., 1971, University of California, Berkeley; MS., State University of New York College of Environmental Science and Forestry; PhD, 1983, Pennsylvania State University
- Thesis: Actual and apparent elitism in the environmental-conservation movement: analysis through a theoretical model of political participation. (1983)

Academic work
- Institutions: Utah State University; University of Michigan

Paul Mohai is a Professor and Chair of the Resource Policy and Behavior Concentration at the University of Michigan. He co-established the University of Michigan's Environmental Justice Program and co-published one of the first major scholarly books that explored the links between race, class, and environmental hazards.

== Early life and education ==
Mohai attended the University of California, Berkeley for his Bachelor of Arts degree and later enrolled in the State University of New York College of Environmental Science and Forestry and Pennsylvania State University for his graduate degrees.

== Career ==
Following his PhD, Mohai worked as an assistant professor at Utah State University in their College of Natural Resources. He eventually joined the faculty at the University of Michigan and co-established the school's Environmental Justice Program.

In 1990, Mohai and Bunyan Bryant co-published Race and the Incidence of Environmental Hazards, which was one of the first major scholarly books that explored the links between race, class, and environmental hazards. He was also appointed the Principal Investigator of the University of Michigan's Detroit Area Study (DAS). The study focused on "issues and problems facing residents of Detroit and the surrounding metropolitan area."

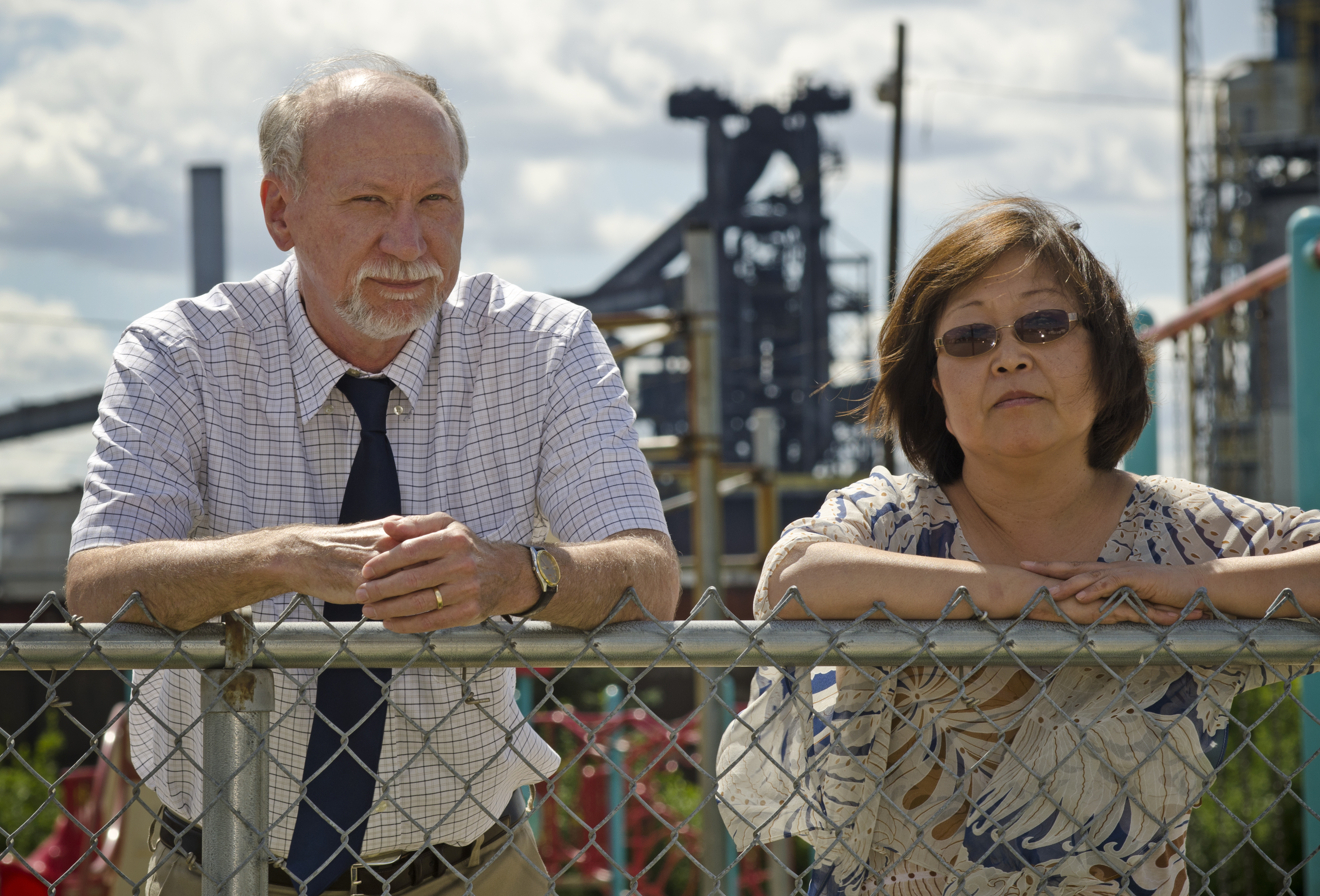
Mohai with Byoung-Suk Kweon in 2011 studying one of Detroit's most polluted areas.

Following the signing of Executive Order 12898, "Federal Actions to Address Environmental Justice in Minority Populations and Low-Income Populations," Bryant, Mohai, and Jerry Poje co-facilitated a symposium on Health Research and Needs to Ensure Environmental Justice. The symposium included 1,100 community leaders, scientists, legal experts, and federal representatives. In 1998, he co-published Is there a "race" effect on concern for environmental quality? with Bryant. The article focused on the different concerns black individuals had regarding their environment compared to their white counterparts; such as a larger emphasis on pollution than nature preservation issues.

In 2002, Mohai was re-appointed Principal Investigator of the University of Michigan's Detroit Area Study (DAS). With his findings, Mohai published a study titled Dispelling Old Myths: African American Concern for the Environment, which was considered the first comprehensive examination of environmental concerns and actions of African Americans. A few years later, he co-authored a report with Robert Bullard titled Toxic Wastes and Race at Twenty, 1987-2007: Grassroots Struggles to Dismantle Environmental Racism in the United States, which examined how people of color disproportionality lived in hazardous waste hotspots which were not protected by environmental law. As a result of his report, Mohai was appointed to the United States Environmental Protection Agency's National Environmental Justice Advisory Council.

In 2013, he was awarded the Harold R. Johnson Diversity Service Award from the University of Michigan in recognition of his "leadership in the environmental justice field of study." The following year, he was the recipient of the 2014 Damu Smith Power of One Leadership Award. Ten years after the publication of Toxic Wastes and Race at Twenty, 1987-2007: Grassroots Struggles to Dismantle Environmental Racism in the United States, Mohai was selected to sit on Michigan's Environmental Justice Work Group. In 2019, Mohai and graduate students Laura Grier, Delia Mayor, and Brett Zeuner co-published a report titled Assessing the State of Environmental Justice in Michigan. The researchers evaluated Detroit citizen's exposure to toxic air pollutants using census tracts.
