= 1966 Texas Senate election =

- November 8, 1966

All 31 seats in the Texas Senate 16 seats needed for a majority
	Majority party	Minority party
Party	Democratic	Republican
Last election	31	0
Seats won	30	1
Seat change	▼1	▲1
Popular vote	1,071,981	201,459
Percentage	83.40%	15.67%
Swing	▼1.26%	▲0.33%
- Senate results by district Democratic hold Republican gain
President pro tempore before election
Democratic
Elected President pro tempore
Democratic

The 1966 Texas Senate election was held on November 8, 1966, to determine which party would control the Texas Senate for the following two years in the 60th Texas Legislature. All 31 seats in the Texas Senate were up for election to either two- or four-year terms, due to mid-decade redistricting to rectify egregious malapportionment among Senate districts. This had been spurred by the U.S. Supreme Court decision Reynolds v. Sims. These districts greatly increased the voting power of the state's growing urban and suburban areas. Republicans won a seat in the Senate for the first time since 1924, and Barbara Jordan became the first African American member of the chamber elected since the 1890s, and the first African American woman ever elected.

== Background ==
Democrats had controlled the Texas Senate since the 1872 elections. Since the implementation of Jim Crow voting restrictions in the early 1900s, Democrats had held unanimous or nearly unanimous control of the entire state legislature. These legislators were almost exclusively White men, with White women and Hispanic men winning office from time to time. No African American had won any election to the legislature in the entire 20th century up to this point.

=== Redistricting ===
Several senate districts had wildly disproportionate populations, with ratios as large as 9:1 in the most extreme cases. The Texas Constitution explicitly limited counties to a maximum of one senator each, even if their populations would have called for more than one in an equally-apportioned system. Due to this, any attempts to challenge the maps on these grounds in state courts were denied. Voting rights advocates shifted their efforts to federal courts, and after the landmark U.S. Supreme Court decision Reynolds v. Sims, the judges overseeing the challenge to the state's legislative maps in Kilgarlin v. Martin issued a summary judgement striking down them down. They refused to impose their own maps, however, leaving that role to the state legislature, who passed new maps in their 1965 legislative session. Despite challenges to the map for the House of Representatives, no substantial court challenge emerged against the map for the Senate.

The new maps passed by the legislature marked a drastic departure from the previous balance of power in the chamber despite efforts to gerrymander the new maps to favor non-Hispanic White Democratic incumbents. These changes were most pronounced in the state's urban areas. Harris County gained three Senate seats, Dallas County gained two, and Bexar County gained one. Dallas, Bexar, and Tarrant Counties also gained portions of an additional district each.

== Results ==
Democrats maintained near-complete control of the chamber, but they lost one seat to the Republicans, breaking the unanimous control they had held since the 1928 elections. Barbara Jordan became the first African American elected to the Senate during the entire 20th century. The new districts led to an immediate shift in the geography of political power in the state, greatly benefiting the state's urban and suburban areas by increasing their representation.
