= Andrew I.E. Ewoh =

Andrew I.E. Ewoh is a professor of Political Science and Public Administration in the Barbara Jordan - Mickey Leland School Of Public Affairs at Texas Southern University.

Prior to his employment at TSU, Ewoh was the Director of the Master of Public Administration Program, co-director of the MBA/MPA Dual Degree Program, and Professor of Public Administration at Kennesaw State University. He has long-term research and teaching interests in public administration, public policy, governance, human resource management, public-private partnerships, and political economy. His articles have appeared in Review of Policy Research, Review of Public Personnel Administration, International Review of Public Administration, Politics & Policy, Public Works Management & Policy, and numerous scholarly journals. He has authored several book chapters and some of his scholarly contributions are part of required readings in various American as well as foreign universities and colleges. Most of his scholarly contributions are cited in other scholars’ research and funded projects.

Before joining the faculty at KSU in 2008, he was a professor of Political Science and Program Coordinator at Prairie View A&M University. Ewoh served as an adjunct professor of Public Administration at Texas Southern University, and on the faculty of School of Business and Public Administration at the University of Houston–Clear Lake. He was a visiting professor of Public Administration in the National School of Political Studies and Public Administration, Bucharest, Romania in 2010. He received his PhD and MA in political economy from the University of Texas at Dallas, an MPA in public administration from Southern University, Baton Rouge, Louisiana, and a BS in business administration from the University of Louisiana at Lafayette. Ewoh currently serves as the editor-in-chief of the African Social Science Review, the Managing Editor of the Journal of Public Management & Social Policy, and is a Fellow of the Academy of Political Science. He is also a Fulbright Specialist for the Council for International Exchange of Scholars, and a visiting professor of Public Administration for the University of Fort Hare, South Africa.
