= Dumping in Dixie =

1990 book by Robert D. Bullard

- Cover of third edition
- Author: Robert D. Bullard
- Language: English
- Subject: Economics, Environmental justice
- Publisher: Westview Press (first and second edition), Routledge (third edition)
- Publication date: October 16, 1990
- Publication place: United States
- Media type: Print (Paperback)
- Pages: 165 (first edition)
- ISBN: 978-0-8133-7954-8 (Paperback- first edition)

Dumping in Dixie is a 1990 book by the American professor, author, activist, and environmental sociologist Robert D. Bullard. Bullard spotlights the quintessence of the economic, social, and psychological consequences induced by the siting of noxious facilities in mobilizing the African American community. Starting with the assertion that every human has the right to a healthy environment, the book documents the journey of five American communities of color as they rally to safeguard their health and homes from the lethal effects of pollution. Further, Bullard investigates the heterogeneous obstacles to social and environmental justice that African American communities often encounter. Dumping in Dixie is widely acknowledged as the first book to discuss environmental injustices and distill the concept of environmental justice holistically. Since the publication of Dumping in Dixie, Bullard has emerged as one of the seminal figures of the environmental justice movement; some even label Bullard as the "father of environmental justice".

== Publication history ==
Dumping in Dixie has three editions. Westview Press published the first edition on October 16, 1990 and launched the second edition on July 1, 1994. Routledge released the third and latest edition on March 24, 2000.

== Summary of chapters ==
Seven chapters compose Bullard's book.

=== Chapter 1 - Environmentalism and Social Justice ===
The introductory chapter of Bullard's book chronicles the rise of the environmental movement in the United States, exposes the void of existing literature examining the intersection of environmentalism and social justice, and details methodologies employed to actualize the novel.

=== Chapter 2 - Race, Class, and the Politics of Place ===
The second chapter considers the intersection of race, class, and place. In particular, Bullard alludes to four cases (Chemical Waste Management, SCA Services, Industrial Chemical Company, and Warren County PCB Landfill) to depict how the siting of toxic waste facilities and landfills often burdens communities with high percentages of poor, elderly, young, and minority (mainly black) residents.

=== Chapter 3 - Dispute Resolution and Toxics: Case Studies ===
In the third chapter, Bullard examines five case studies from diverse settings (Houston, Dallas, Virginia, Louisiana, and Alabama) to highlight the conflicts and unfairness surrounding "unwanted land uses."

=== Chapter 4 - The Environmental Justice Movement: Survey Results ===
Bullard commences the fourth chapter by revealing a gap in the existing literature—while studies underlining how unwanted land uses disproportionately jeopardize poor or minority communities are burgeoning, information regarding how victims cope with such ecological threats is limited. Correspondingly, Bullard presents the results of his survey study investigating environmental dispute-resolution strategies employed by black residents, deriving from 523 responses from 5 locations.

=== Chapter 5 - Environmental Racism Revisited ===
Through chapter five, Bullard unpacks the concept of environmental racism—how public policies and industrial practices emanate benefits for white people while shifting costs to people of color—by depicting the economic transition of southern states like Louisiana.

=== Chapter 6 - Environmental Justice as a Working Model ===
In essence, the sixth chapter delves into the contemporary environmental protection model while simultaneously advancing an alternative framework, the national environmental justice framework, for addressing the wants and concerns of disenfranchised communities

=== Chapter 7 - Action Strategies for the Twenty-First Century ===
The seventh chapter provides a brief recapitulation of Bullard's chief findings on people-of-color environmentalism. Further, it outlines action strategies necessary to enhance the environmental justice movement and environmentalism in this generation.

== Reaction ==
=== Favorable ===
Bailus Walker Jr.'s review in the Journal of Public Health Policy commends Bullard's "sensibility" and "style". Moreover, Walker Jr. labels Bullard as a "master at reaching relevant conclusions" while simultaneously lauding Dumping in Dixie's uniformity and clarity. Similarly, accentuating the book's "unusual approach", H.H. Fawcett posits that Dumping in Dixie is "a book well worth considering" in a review in the Journal of Hazardous Materials. Finally, Daniel Suman's review in Ecology Law Quarterly ascertains that Bullard's Dumping in Dixie "is an important contribution" to the burgeoning field of environmental equity and racism.

=== Mixed ===
Eddie Girdner's review proposes that Dumping in Dixie is a "valuable contribution to the literature on the hazardous waste issue and the environmental movement." Nevertheless, shortly after, Girdner cautions readers that Bullard's book reaches an "overly optimistic conclusion." Akin, Robert Collin's review published in the Journal of the American Planning Association maintains that Bullard's book presents "both original research and good descriptive data" regarding "an important land-use issue." However, Collin also warns that "although Dumping in Dixie is successful in targeting a general audience, planners will find themselves with unanswered questions" by dint of the book's lack of specificity. Finally, Bruce Wade, writing in Contemporary Sociology, notes that Dumping in Dixie is a "timely book on an old topic: environmental pollution." Besides, Wade commends the book's "lucid" writing style and "logical" organization, further adding that Bullard's commentary "provides valuable insight into the different processes that foster social protest." Regardless, Wade asserts that Bullard's advanced solutions are "mundane and traditional." All in all, Wade concludes that - "As an explanation, Bullard's work falls short; his description, however, is provocative and helpful."

=== Unfavorable ===
Lawrence Hamilton's review in Social Forces denounces Dumping in Dixie's "narrow" solutions imbued by the NIMBY (Not In My Backyard) ideology to the waste management problem. In particular, Hamilton emphasizes that Bullard "misses a chance to connect local activism with larger environmental issues." Similarly, Texas A&M University professor John Thomas posits that Dumping in Dixie is excessively "laden with human exploitation, suffering, apathy, and pain." Furthermore, Thomas holds that Bullard has made a "commitment to prod our consciences."

== Aftermath ==
Since the release of Dumping in Dixie, Bullard has continued his activism and points to situations of environmental injustice emerging in his current work. In 1991, after the book’s release, Bullard was involved in planning the First National People of Color Environmental Leadership Summit. He also assisted in passing an executive order which attempted to ensure that environmental justice had to be considered by government bodies. Additionally, he has gone on to release many other books including several contributions from other leading activists. Environmental justice continues to be an ongoing struggle exemplified in events across the United States such as Hurricane Katrina, which Bullard has focused on through his continued body of work.

== Awards ==
- National Wildlife Federation (NWF) Conservation Achievement Award in Science (1990)

== See also ==
- Flammable: Environmental Suffering in an Argentine Shantytown (2008)
- Black Faces, White Spaces (2014)
- Salvage the Bones (2011)
- Toms River (2013)
- A Civil Action (1995)
