= Robert D. Bullard =

American sociologist, activist, and university administrator (born 1946)

Robert Bullard
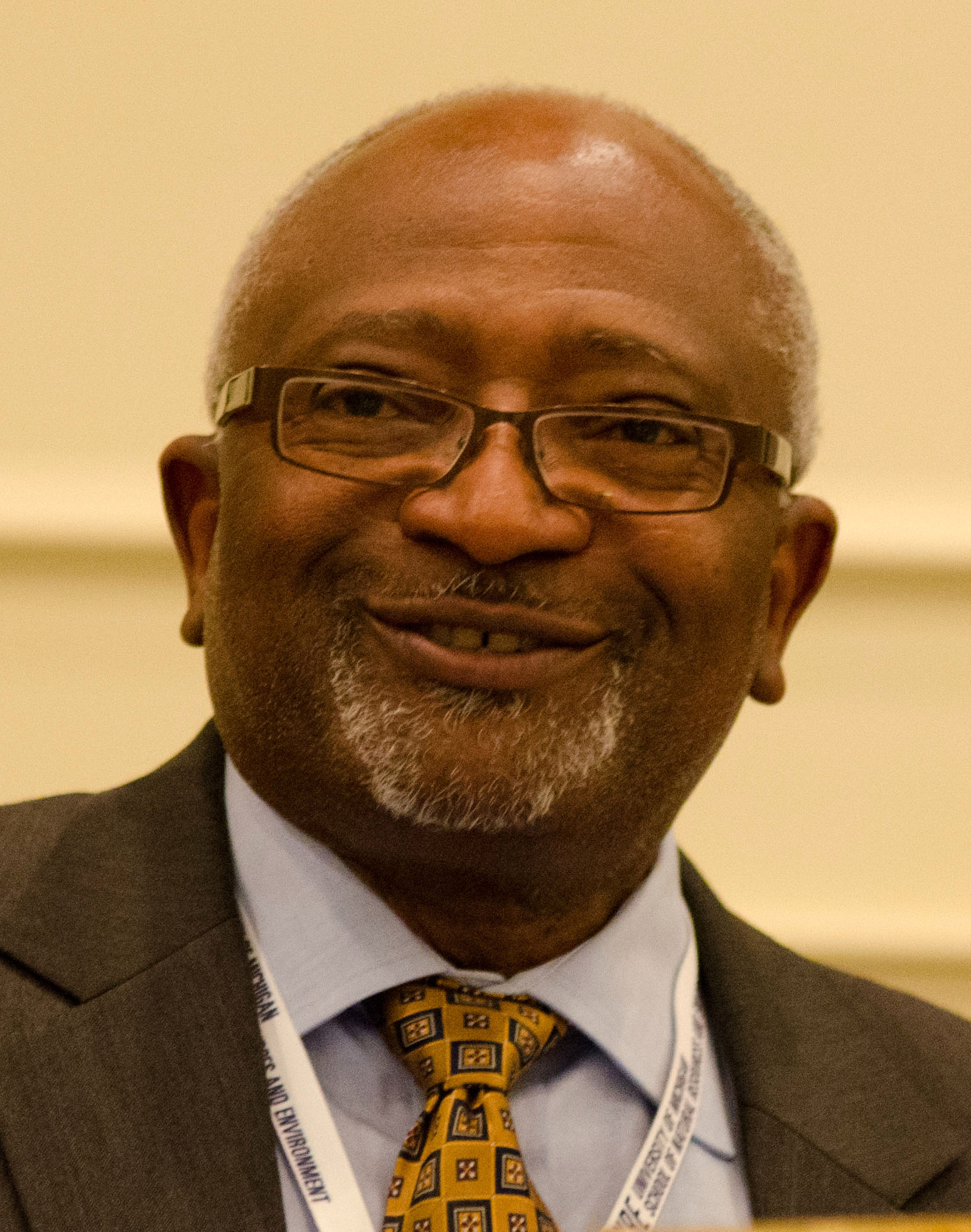
- Born: Robert Doyle Bullard; December 21, 1946 (age 79); Elba, Alabama, U.S.
- Education: Alabama A&M University (BA); Clark Atlanta University (MA); Iowa State University (PhD)
- Spouse: Linda McKeever
- Scientific career
- Fields: Sociology
- Workplaces: Texas Southern University; Clark Atlanta University; University of California, Riverside
- Thesis: Voluntary Participation: Implications for Social Change and Conflict in a Community Decision Organization (1976)
- Doctoral advisor: Robert Richards
- Website: Official website

Robert Doyle Bullard (born December 21, 1946) is an American academic who is the former dean of the Barbara Jordan – Mickey Leland School of Public Affairs (October 2011 – August 2016) and is currently a distinguished professor at Texas Southern University. Previously Ware Professor of Sociology and director of the Environmental Justice Resource Center at Clark Atlanta University, Bullard is known as the "father of environmental justice". He has been a leading campaigner against environmental racism, as well as the foremost scholar of the problem, and of the Environmental Justice Movement which sprung up in the United States in the 1980s. He is the author of 18 books that cover a variety of social issues such as environmental racism, climate justice, and emergency responses.

== Early life and education ==
Born in Elba, Alabama, Bullard is the son of Nehemiah and Myrtle Brundidge Bullard; he was the fourth of five children. He graduated from Elba's Mulberry Heights High School as class salutatorian in 1964.

Continuing his education, Bullard received a bachelor's degree in government at Alabama A&M University in Huntsville, 1968. Upon graduating from college, he served two years in the United States Marine Corps, at an "air control station in North Carolina".

Bullard's M.A. in sociology was earned at Clark Atlanta University in 1972. Bullard obtained his Ph.D. in sociology at Iowa State University in 1976, under the supervision of urban sociologist Robert ("Bob") O. Richards.

== Environmental justice work ==
=== Bean v. Southwestern Waste Management, Inc. ===
In 1979 Bullard's wife, attorney Linda McKeever Bullard, represented Margaret Bean and other Houston residents in their struggle against a plan that would locate a municipal landfill next to their homes. The lawsuit, Bean v. Southwestern Waste Management, Inc., was the first of its kind in the United States that charged environmental discrimination in waste facility siting under the civil rights laws. Houston's middle-class, suburban Northwood Manor neighborhood was an unlikely location for a garbage dump except that it was over 82 percent black. Bullard, having received his doctoral degree only a couple of years before, was drawn into the case as an expert witness. In this role Bullard conducted a study which documented the location of municipal waste disposal facilities in Houston. Entitled 'Solid Waste Sites and the Black Houston Community', the study was the first comprehensive account of ecoracism in the United States. Bullard and his researchers found that African American neighbourhoods in Houston were often chosen for toxic waste sites. All five city-owned garbage dumps, six of the eight city-owned garbage incinerators, and three of the four privately owned landfills were sited in black neighbourhoods, although blacks made up only 25 percent of the city's population. This discovery prompted Bullard to begin a long academic and activist campaign against environmental racism. "Without a doubt", Bullard has said of his experience, "it was a form of apartheid where whites were making decisions and black people and brown people and people of color, including Native Americans on reservations, had no seat at the table."

=== Early work ===
Over the 1980s Bullard widened his study of environmental racism to the whole American South, focusing on communities in Houston, Dallas, Texas, Alsen, Louisiana, Institute, West Virginia, and Emelle, Alabama. Again he found a clear overrepresentation of environmental hazards in black areas as compared to white areas, causing increased health risks to black citizens. In 1990 Bullard published his first book, Dumping in Dixie: Race, Class and Environmental Quality. In the book, Bullard wrote that the Environmental Justice Movement, a grassroots movement by people of color spreading across America to protest environmental racism, signified a new convergence of the civil rights movement and the environmental movement of the 1960s.

=== Advocacy ===
In 1990 Bullard (then at the University of California-Riverside) became one leader of a group of prominent academics, later known as the Michigan Group, including Bunyan Bryant of the University of Michigan and Charles Lee of the United Church of Christ. The group wrote letters to Louis Sullivan, the Secretary of the U.S. Department of Health and Human Services, and to William Reilly, the head of the Environmental Protection Agency, asking for meetings with the officials to discuss governmental policy on environmental discrimination. Sullivan never responded, but Reilly met the advocacy group several times, resulting in the creation of the EPA's Work Group on Environmental Equity. This group later became the Office of Environmental Equity, and then the Office of Environmental Justice under EPA Administrator Carol Browner in 1993.

Bullard also played a key role in the organising of the First National People of Color Environmental Leadership Summit in 1991. Starting out with a list of only 30 people of color groups working on environmental issues, Bullard expanded the list to over 300 groups by calling the leaders he knew personally and gathering information on other groups they had come across. It was these groups that attended the Leadership Summit in October 1991, at which a list of seventeen 'Principles of Environmental Justice' was adopted. Bullard's expanded list eventually included groups from outside the United States, including Puerto Rico, Canada and Mexico, and has been published as the "People of Color Environmental Group Directory" by the Charles Stewart Mott Foundation. In 1994 President Bill Clinton signed the Environmental Justice Executive Order 12898 after advice and research by a National Environmental Justice Advisory Council (NEJAC), which included Professor Bullard, who chaired the Health and Research Subcommittee.

Bullard continued to act on behalf of struggling African American groups across the U.S. It was his expert testimony that won the case of Citizens Against Nuclear Trash (CANT) v. Louisiana Energy Services (LES) for the environmental justice group, directly causing the federal government's decision to deny the LES's permit for a uranium enrichment plant in Forest Grove and Center Springs, Louisiana. In 2006 when asked what keeps him going in his quest for environmental justice, Bullard answered, "People who fight... People who do not let the garbage trucks and the landfills and the petrochemical plants roll over them. That has kept me in this movement for the last 25 years. And in the last 10 years, we've been winning: lawsuits are being won, reparations are being paid, apologies are being made. These companies have been put on notice that they can't do this anymore, anywhere."

== Academic career ==
- Associate/ Assistant Professor, Texas Southern University, Houston, Texas, 1976-88
- Associate Professor, University of Tennessee, 1987–88
- Associate Professor/ Visiting Scholar, University of California at Berkeley, 1988–89
- Professor/ Associate Professor, Department of Sociology, University of California-Riverside, 1989–94
- Ware Distinguished Professor of Sociology; Director, Environmental Justice Resource Center, Clark-Atlanta University, Atlanta, Georgia, 1994–2011
- Dean, Barbara Jordan-Mickey Leland School of Public Affairs, Texas Southern University, 2011–present

== Awards and recognition ==
- Conservation Achievement Award, National Wildlife Federation, 1990
- One of thirteen "Environmental Leaders of the Century", Newsweek, 2008
- Building Economic Alternatives Award, Co-op America, 2008
- John Muir Award, Sierra Club, 2013
- American Bar Association, Award for Excellence in Environmental, Energy, and Resources Stewardship, 2015
- Iowa State University Alumni Association, Alumni Merit Award, 2015
- Stephen Schneider Award for Outstanding Climate Science Communication, 2019
- 2020 Lifetime Achievement Award (Champions of the Earth)
- Member of the White House Environmental Justice Advisory Committee, 2021
- University of California Berkeley Ecology Law Quarterly, Environmental Leadership Award, Environmental Leadership Award, 2022
- The Association for the Advancement of Sustainability in Higher Education, Lifetime Achievement Award, 2022.
- University of Johannesburg, Honorary Doctorate, 2022
- Georgetown University, Honorary Doctorate, 2022
- Membership in the American Academy of Arts & Sciences, 2022
- Elected Member of the National Academy of Medicine, 2024

== Selected publications ==
- Bullard, RD (1983). Solid waste sites and the black Houston community. Sociological Inquiry 53, pp. 273–288.
- Bullard, RD, ed (1983). Confronting Environmental Racism: Voices from the Grassroots. Boston: South End Press.
- Bullard, RD (1987). Invisible Houston: The Black Experience in Boom and Bust. College Station Texas A&M University Press.
- Bullard, RD (1989). In Search of the New South: The Black Urban Experience in the 1970s and 1980s. Tuscaloosa: University of Alabama Press.
- Bullard, RD, ed (2000a). [1990]. Dumping in Dixie: Race, Class, and Environmental Quality, 3rd ed. Boulder, CO: Westview Press. ISBN 978-0813367927
- Bullard, RD, ed (1994). Unequal Protection: Environmental Justice and Communities of Color. San Francisco: Sierra Club Books.
- Bullard, RD, Grigsby, JE, III, & Lee, C (1994). "Residential Apartheid: The American Legacy. Los Angeles: Center for Afro-American Studies.
- Bullard, RD, & Johnson, GS, eds (1997). Just Transportation: Dismantling Race and Class Barriers to Mobility. Gabriola Island, BC: New Society Publishers.
- Bullard, RD, Johnson, GS, & Wright, BH (1997). Confronting environmental injustice: It's the right thing to do. Environmentalism and Race, Gender, Class Issues. Race Gender and Class 5 (1), pp. 63–79.
- Bullard, RD, & Johnson, GS (1998). Environmental and economic justice: Implications for public policy. Journal of Public Management and Social Policy 4 (4), pp. 137–148.
- Bullard, RD, Johnson, GS, & Torres, AO (1999, Fall). Atlanta: Megasprawl. Forum: For Applied Research and Public Policy 14 (3), pp. 17–23.
- Bullard, RD, Johnson, GS, & Torres, AO, eds (2000). Sprawl City: Race, Politics, and Planning in Atlanta. Washington, DC: Island Press.
- Bullard, RD, Johnson, GS, & Torres, AO (2000, February/March). Dismantling transportation apartheid through environmental justice. Progress: Surface Transportation Policy Project 10 (1), pp. 4–5
- Bullard, RD (2000b). "People of Color Environmental Groups Directory." Flint, MI: Charles Stewart Mott Foundation.
- Bullard, RD, ed (2003). Just Sustainabilities: Development in an Unequal World. Cambridge, MA: MIT Press.
- Bullard, RD (2004). Highway Robbery: Transportation Racism and New Routes to Equity. Boston: South End Press.
- Bullard, RD (2005). The Quest for Environmental Justice: Human Rights and the Politics of Pollution. San Francisco: Sierra Club Books.
- Bullard, RD (2007). Growing Smarter: Achieving Livable Communities, Environmental Justice, and Regional Equity. Cambridge, MA: MIT Press.
- Bullard, RD (2007). The Black Metropolis in the Twenty-First Century: Race and the Politics of Place. New York: Rowman & Littlefield.
- Bullard, RD (2009). Race, Place, and Environmental Justice After Hurricane Katrina: Struggles to Reclaim, Rebuild, and Revitalize New Orleans and the Gulf Coast. Boulder, CO: Westview Press.

== See also ==
- History of African-Americans in Houston
