= 1968 Texas Senate election =

- November 5, 1968

15 out of 31 seats in the Texas Senate 16 seats needed for a majority
	Majority party	Minority party
Party	Democratic	Republican
Last election	30	1
Seats before	29	2
Seats won	13	2
Seats after	29	2
Seat change	Steady	Steady
Popular vote	857,379	312,743
Percentage	73.27%	26.73%
Swing	▼10.13%	▲11.06%
- Senate results by district Democratic hold Republican hold No election
President pro tempore before election
Democratic
Elected President pro tempore
Democratic

The 1968 Texas Senate election was held on November 5, 1968, to determine which party would control the Texas Senate for the following two years in the 61st Texas Legislature. 15 of the 31 seats in the Texas Senate were up for election to four-year terms. Democrats maintained their majority in the Senate, but Republicans gained one seat compared to the 1966 elections, winning a total of two.

== Background ==
Democrats had controlled the Texas Senate since the 1872 elections. The chamber's membership had undergone a massive overhaul after the 1966 elections due to redistricting. This greatly shifted political power away from rural areas, which had held disproportionate power due to malapportionment, towards the state's growing urban and suburban areas. As a consequence, the chamber saw the election of its first African American member of the 20th century and its first Republican since 1924.

=== District 8 special election ===
George Parkhouse, the Democrat who had represented Dallas County in the Senate since 1951, died in August 1967. Republican Ike Harris, whom Parkhouse had narrowly defeated in 1966, easily won the special election held on November 11 to succeed him, flipping the seat and becoming the chamber's second Republican member.

District 8 special election
Candidate	Votes	%
Ike Harris	15,105	70.82%
Bill Harris	3,718	17.43%
Horace Houston	1,114	5.22%
Minor candidates	1,391	6.52%
Total votes	21,328	100.00%

== Results ==
Democrats maintained near-complete control of the chamber, but Republicans continued their gradual growth in the state, holding both of their seats in the chamber.
