= Bruce Wolfe =

American artist (1941–2023)

Bruce Wolfe (1941 – December 27, 2023) was an American sculptor, artist, illustrator, and designer, known for producing sculptures of and for many notable figures. The San Francisco Chronicle described him as "the top sculptor for hire in the Bay Area, and maybe the nation". Within his forty-year career he created sculptures and busts of Barbara Jordan, Margaret Thatcher, former mayor Ilus W. Davis of Kansas City, former Secretary of State George Shultz, Norman Shumway, and former Supreme Court Chief Justice William Rehnquist. Wolfe resided in Northern California for most of his life. He studied art at the San Jose State University and the San Francisco Art Institute. He taught painting and sculpture, at the Academy of Art in San Francisco, and the College of Arts and Crafts in Oakland California.

He was also credited with creating a theatrical poster for Indiana Jones and the Temple of Doom.

His work has been exhibited across New York, California, Paris, and at the Smithsonian. His awards include a CLIO, Endowment of Arts Federal Achievement Award, First Place at the Art of the Portrait Conference 2001, a Joseph Henniger Award, Zellerbach and Foster & Kleiser Awards.

== See also ==
- Statue of Barbara Jordan (Austin–Bergstrom International Airport)
- Statue of Barbara Jordan (University of Texas at Austin)
