= Statue of Barbara Jordan (University of Texas at Austin) =

Sculpture in Austin, Texas, U.S.

Barbara Jordan
- Artist: Bruce Wolfe
- Year: 2009
- Subject: Barbara Jordan
- Location: Austin, Texas, United States; 30°17′14.9″N 97°44′26.2″W
- Owner: University of Texas at Austin

Bruce Wolfe's statue of Barbara Jordan on the University of Texas at Austin campus was erected in 2009.

== See also ==
- 2009 in art
