= Black Faces, White Spaces =

2014 book by Carolyn Finney

Black Faces, White Spaces: Reimagining the Relationship of African Americans to the Great Outdoors
- Author: Carolyn Finney
- Subject: Race; environment
- Published: 2014
- Publisher: University of North Carolina Press
- Media type: Print
- Pages: 173 pp.
- ISBN: 978-1-4696-1448-9
- OCLC: 880354760

Black Faces, White Spaces: Reimagining the Relationship of African Americans to the Great Outdoors is a 2014 book by cultural geographer Carolyn Finney. The book examines the relationship between African Americans and the environment, particularly challenging the notion of the environment and environmentalism as white spaces. Black Faces, White Spaces uses a combination of autoethnographic accounts, discourse analysis of media, interviews, and analysis of artistic forms of expression to contextualize a narrative about environmental policy and race relations in the United States. Finney explores the subject through the lenses of environmental history, feminist and critical race theories. In her discussion of American experiences with the environment, Finney highlights how the legacy of slavery creates disparities in the impact of environmental laws such as the Wilderness Act due to factors such as racial segregation. Black Faces, White Spaces challenges assumptions that the environmental movement makes about universal values, individualism, and agency, arguing that they reflect a class-based and racial power structure that denies participation from people of color.
