= Kilgarlin v. Martin =

United States federal court case

Kilgarlin v. Martin, 252 F. Supp. 404 (S.D. Tex. 1966), dealt with the senatorial districts which traditionally in U.S. national government are not based on population. The Supreme Court ruling in this case stated that the senatorial districts for Texas had to also be based on population size rather than land area.

In 1964 the U.S. Supreme Court decision in Reynolds v. Sims held simply "an individual's right to vote for state legislators is unconstitutionally impaired when its weight is in a substantial fashion diluted when compared to with votes of citizens living in other parts of the State." (Reynolds v. Sims, 377 U.S. 533 (1964))

"Barbara Jordan was one of the first politicians to benefit from the new law. She had lost her two legislative campaigns in 1962 and then again in 1964, but once the law changed she was elected as the first black woman to win a senate seat in Texas," Kilgarlin says. Jordan later became the first African American woman elected to Congress from the South. (from an interview by Ana Pacheco May 19, 2009)

The U.S. Supreme Court ultimately heard this case as Kilgarlin v. Hill, 386 U.S. 120 (1967).
