= Barbara Jordan Health Policy Scholars =

US health internship program (2000 to 2012)

The Barbara Jordan Health Policy Scholars Program was a health policy internship program sponsored by the Kaiser Family Foundation from 2000 to 2012. The program was based at Howard University and sponsored an annual group of senior undergraduates and recent graduates to work in U.S. Congress offices and learn about health policy. It was named in honor of Barbara Jordan, the first black woman elected from the U.S. South to the House of Representatives, and a former trustee of the Kaiser Family Foundation. Its goal was to expand the number of people of color in the healthy policy field. Over 170 people participated in the program over its course. The last class was in 2012.
