= Statue of Barbara Jordan (Austin–Bergstrom International Airport) =

2002 statue of Barbara Jordan by Bruce Wolfe in Austin, Texas, U.S.

Barbara Jordan
- Artist: Bruce Wolfe
- Year: 2002
- Subject: Barbara Jordan
- Location: Austin, Texas, United States

Bruce Wolfe's bronze statue of Barbara Jordan at the Austin–Bergstrom International Airport in Austin, Texas, was erected in 2002.

== See also ==
- 2002 in art
