= Barbara Jordan – Mickey Leland School of Public Affairs =

Public policy school within Texas Southern University (TSU)

Barbara Jordan - Mickey Leland School Of Public Affairs
- Parent institution: Texas Southern University
- Dean: Gilbert L. Rochon
- Location: Houston, Texas, United States; 29°43′20″N 95°21′40″W
- Website: bjmlspa.tsu.edu

The Barbara Jordan-Mickey Leland School of Public Affairs, also referred to as BJMLSPA, is the public policy school within Texas Southern University (TSU) in Houston, Texas, United States. For students interested in formulating and shaping public policy, the School offers many opportunities for learning, research, professional development, community partnerships, and public engagement. Located in Houston, the nation's fourth largest city, the BJML SOPA offers opportunities for students to study, observe, and interact with policymakers and decision makers, test new ideas, develop new models, and implement solution-driven strategies.

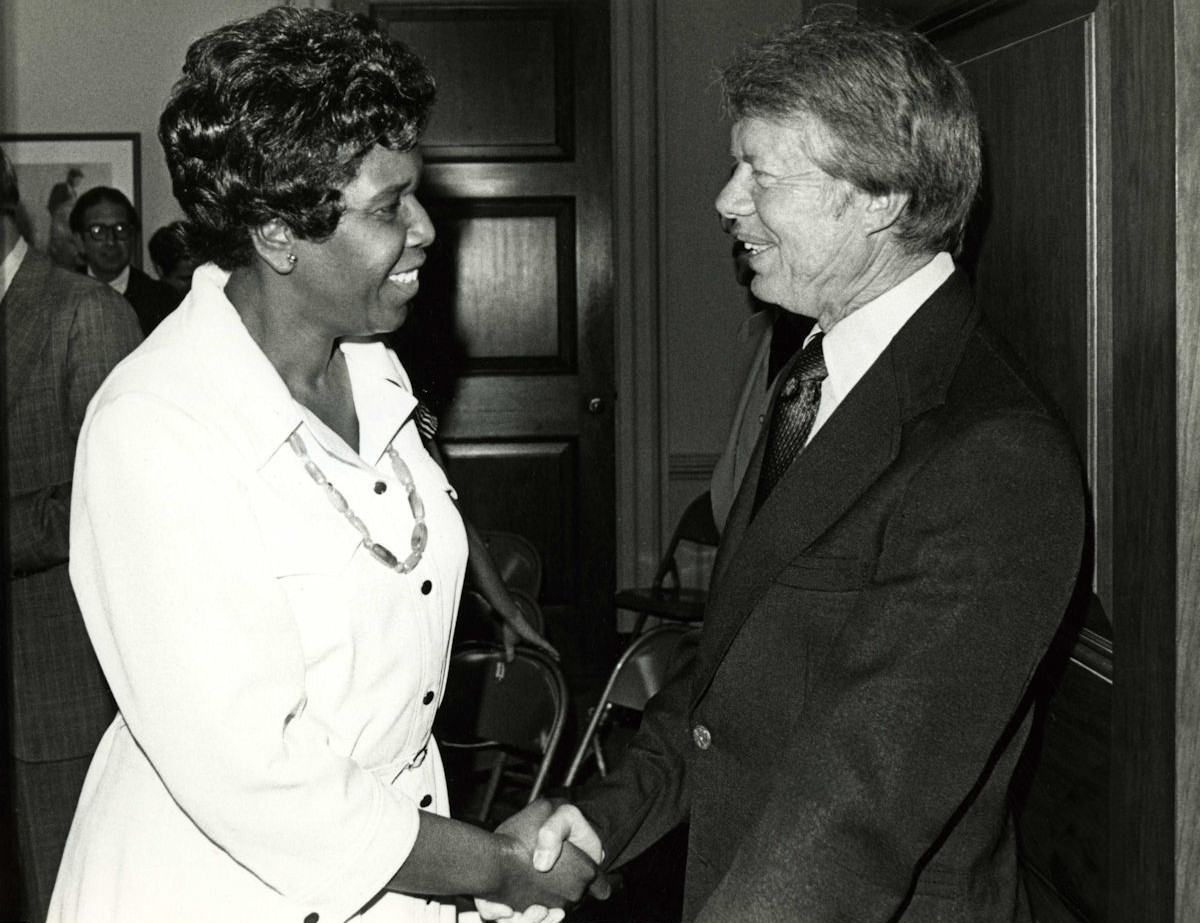
Jordan and Carter c. 1977 w ccwatermark

== Departments and centers ==
The Barbara Jordan-Mickey Leland School of Public Affairs offers instruction, research and professional services through three departments in Political Science (POLS), Administration of Justice (AJ) and Urban Planning and Environmental Policy (UPEP). The Department of Political Science (POLS) offers undergraduate degrees in public affairs, political science and emergency management and homeland security, as well as a master's degree and an executive master's degree in public administration. The Department of Administration of Justice (AJ) offers an undergraduate degree in administration of justice, a master's and an executive master's degree in administration of justice and a Ph.D. in administration of justice. The Department of Urban Planning and Environmental Policy (UPEP) offers instructional services through two graduate degree programs: the master's degree and Doctor of Philosophy (PhD) in UPEP. The Department of Urban Planning and Environmental Policy (UPEP) also offers a dual master's degree in urban planning and environmental policy and Juris Doctor (JD) with the Thurgood Marshall School of Law at Texas Southern University.

== Centers and programs ==
The Barbara Jordan-Mickey Leland School of Public Affairs has 6 centers

- Barbara Jordan Institute
- Mickey Leland Center
- Forensic Science Learning Lab (FSLL)
- Center For Justice Research
- The Bullard Center
- Housing and Community Development Policy Center
- Digital Scholarship @ Texas Southern University – The School of Public Affairs has a scholarly presence on the most acclaimed open access site Digital Commons joining over 360 institutions of higher education. From the schools community, departments, faculty, and students have the opportunity to promote and publish their scholarship. Additionally, the School of Public Affairs hosts three peer-reviewed journals.

== Notable alumni ==
- Barbara Jordan
- Rodney Ellis
- Musiliu Obanikoro
- Carl S. Richie, Jr – vice president government affairs TXU Energy
- Deborah E. King, PhD – president of DEBLAR & Associates, Inc
- Antoinette Samuel – executive director of the American Society for Public Administration (ASPA)
- Clarence Bradford
- Bruce A. Austin
- John L. Guess, III – president of The Guess Group, Inc

== See also ==
- Texas Southern University
