= Bunyan Bryant =

American academic (1935–2024)

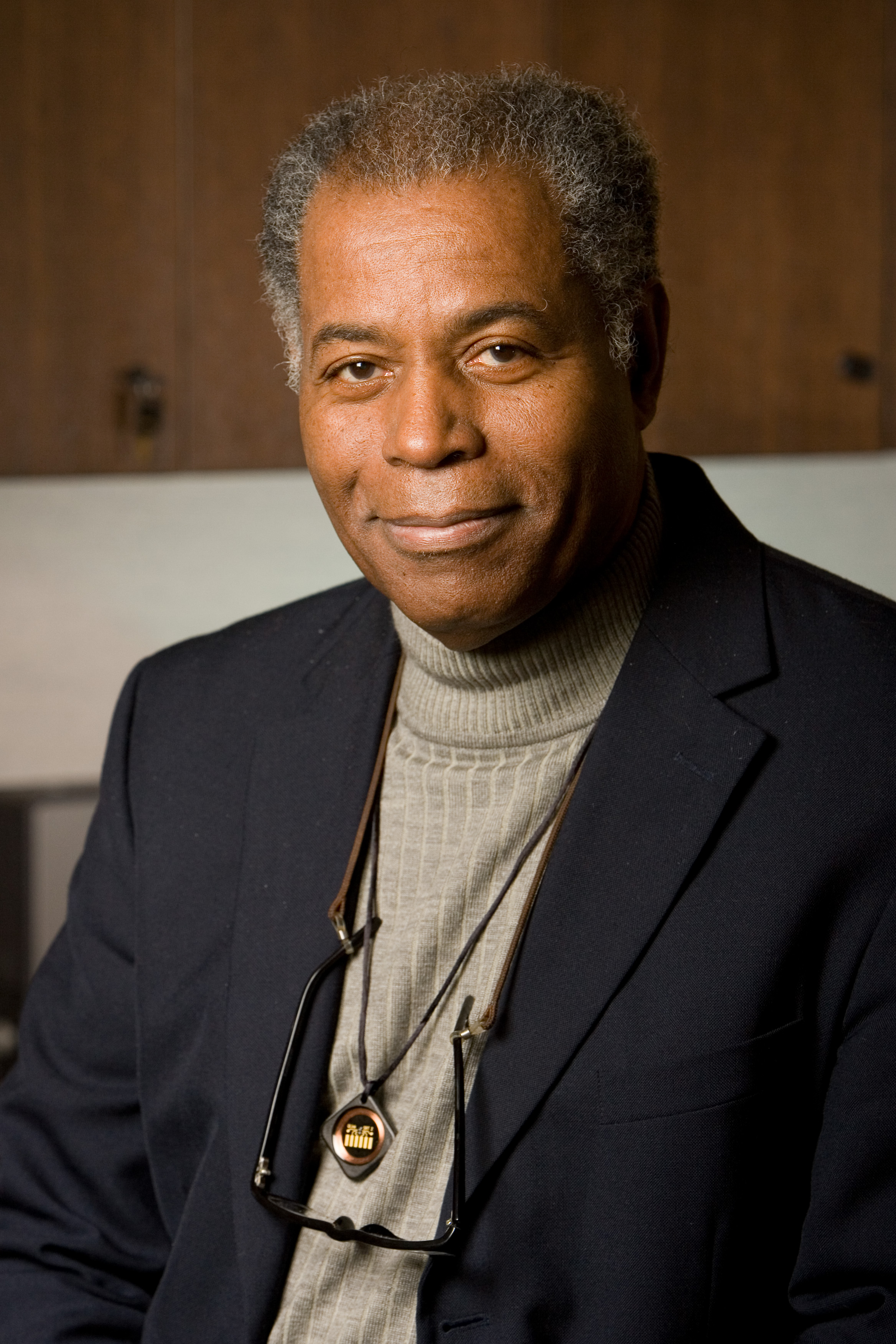
- Bryant in 2007
- Born: March 6, 1935; Little Rock, Arkansas, U.S.
- Died: March 28, 2024 (aged 89); Ann Arbor, Michigan, U.S.
- Spouse: Jean Rae Carlberg

Academic background
- Education: BS., 1958, Eastern Michigan University; MSW., 1965, PhD, 1970, University of Michigan
- Thesis: Intergroup conflict and the instructional process in seven secondary schools (1970)
- Website: www-personal.umich.edu/~bbryant/bio.html

Bunyan I. Bryant Jr. (March 6, 1935 – March 28, 2024) was a Professor Emeritus at the University of Michigan. In 1972, he became the first African American member of the School for Environment and Sustainability (then known as the School of Natural Resources) faculty at the University of Michigan. He was considered a pioneer in the field of environmental justice.

== Early life and education ==
Bryant was born on March 6, 1935, in Little Rock, Arkansas, to parents Christolee née Rowe and Bunyan Bryant Sr. After moving to Flint, Michigan, he attended Flint Northern High School and obtained a position at General Motors. Following pressure from family and friends, he earned his Bachelor of Science at Eastern Michigan University and later enrolled in the University of Michigan for his Master's degree and PhD. While completing his doctoral thesis, Bryant was proposed an offer to join Michigan's School for Environment and Sustainability. Although he was originally skeptical, as his goal was to focus on civil rights, he agreed to an offer of a one-year term. In spite of this, he continued to participate in nonviolent civil rights activities with the Black Action Movement. One of his actions was bringing a racially discriminatory housing policy to the Michigan Civil Rights Commission after he was refused an apartment unit.

== Career ==
In 1972, Bryant became the first African American faculty member of the School for Environment and Sustainability (then known as the School of Natural Resources) at the University of Michigan. In the same year, he co-developed an Environmental Advocacy curriculum to be added to the school.

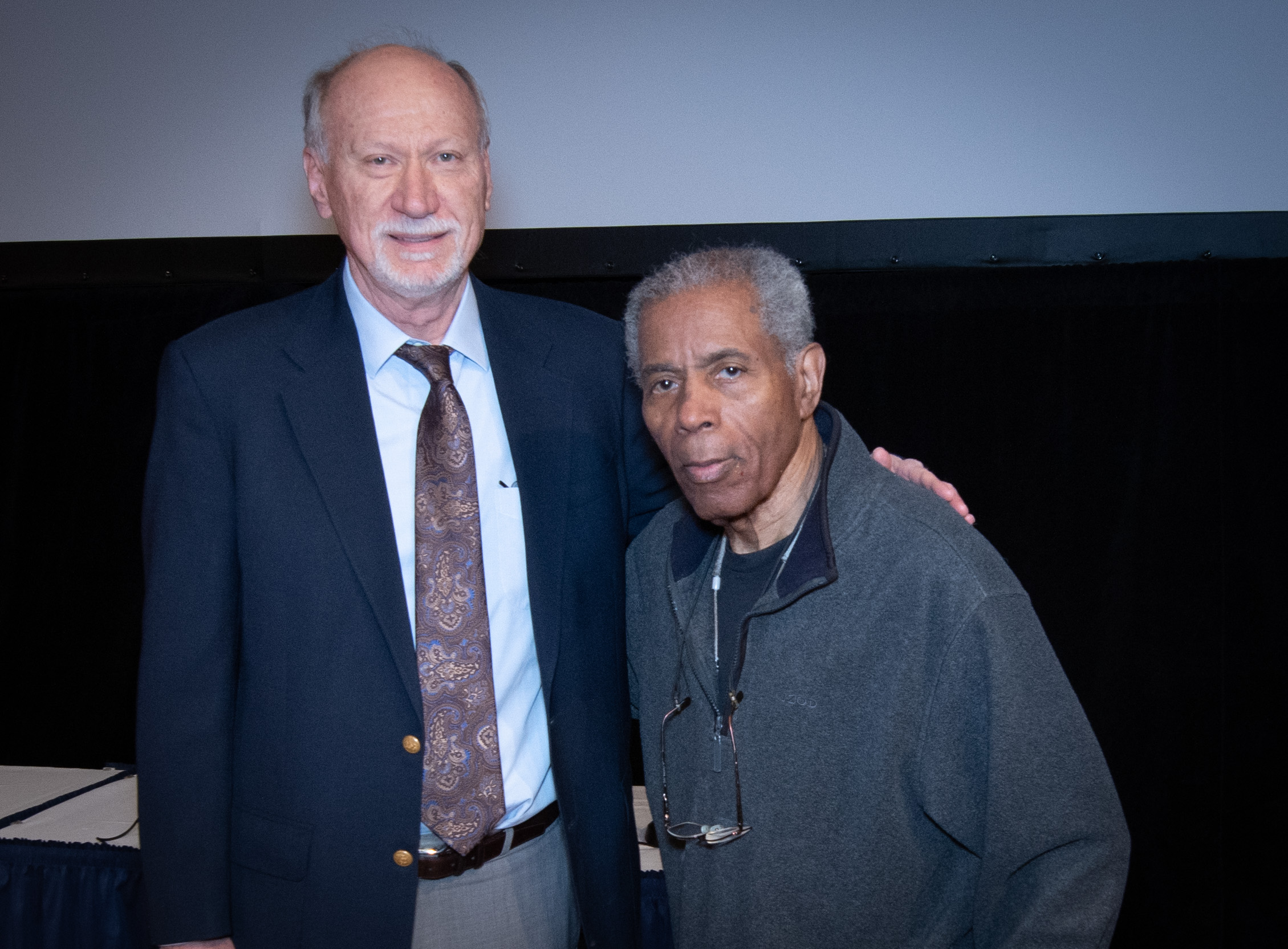
Bryant (right) with Paul Mohai in 2017

During the 1990s, Bryant increased his advocacy for environmental justice to a national level. He organized the first Michigan Conference on Race and the Incidence of Environmental Hazards and joined a group of prominent academics, later known as the Michigan Group or Michigan Coalition. The group wrote letters to Louis Wade Sullivan, the Secretary of the U.S. Department of Health and Human Services, and to William Reilly, the head of the Environmental Protection Agency, asking for meetings with the officials to discuss governmental policy on environmental discrimination. Although Sullivan never responded, Reilly met with them several times, resulting in the creation of the EPA's Work Group on Environmental Equity. Later on, Bryant and Paul Mohai co-published Race and the Incidence of Environmental Hazards, which was one of the first major scholarly books that explored the links between race, class, and environmental hazards. This coincided with his establishment of an Environmental Justice program at the University of Michigan which was the first in the country to offer undergraduate and graduate degrees in the specialty.

In 1994, following the signing of Executive Order 12898, "Federal Actions to Address Environmental Justice in Minority Populations and Low-Income Populations," Bryant, Mohai, and Jerry Poje co-facilitated a symposium on Health Research and Needs to Ensure Environmental Justice. The symposium included 1,100 community leaders, scientists, legal experts, and federal representatives. Following the symposium, Bryant received an Award for Research and Creative Projects and Seed Funding for Research. In 1998, he co-published Is there a "race" effect on concern for environmental quality? with Mohai. The article focused on the different concerns black individuals had regarding their environment compared to their white counterparts; such as a larger emphasis on pollution than nature preservation issues.

In 2000, Bryant received the School of Natural Resources and Environment Outstanding Teaching Award and was later promoted to Thurnau Professorship for a three-year term. In 2004, he was the recipient of the Ernest A. Lynton Award for Faculty Professional Service and Academic Outreach. His advocacy efforts were also recognized by his hometown of Flint, Michigan in 2008 with the Lifetime Leadership Award. Bryant retired from teaching in 2012, and the department threw a conference in his honor titled "Honoring the Career of Bunyan Bryant: The Legacy and Future of Environmental Justice." After retiring from teaching, the Detroiters Working for Environmental Justice established the Bunyan Bryant Award for Academic Excellence.

He received the 2017 environmental justice champion award at the Flint Environmental Justice Summit on March 10, 2017.

== Personal life ==
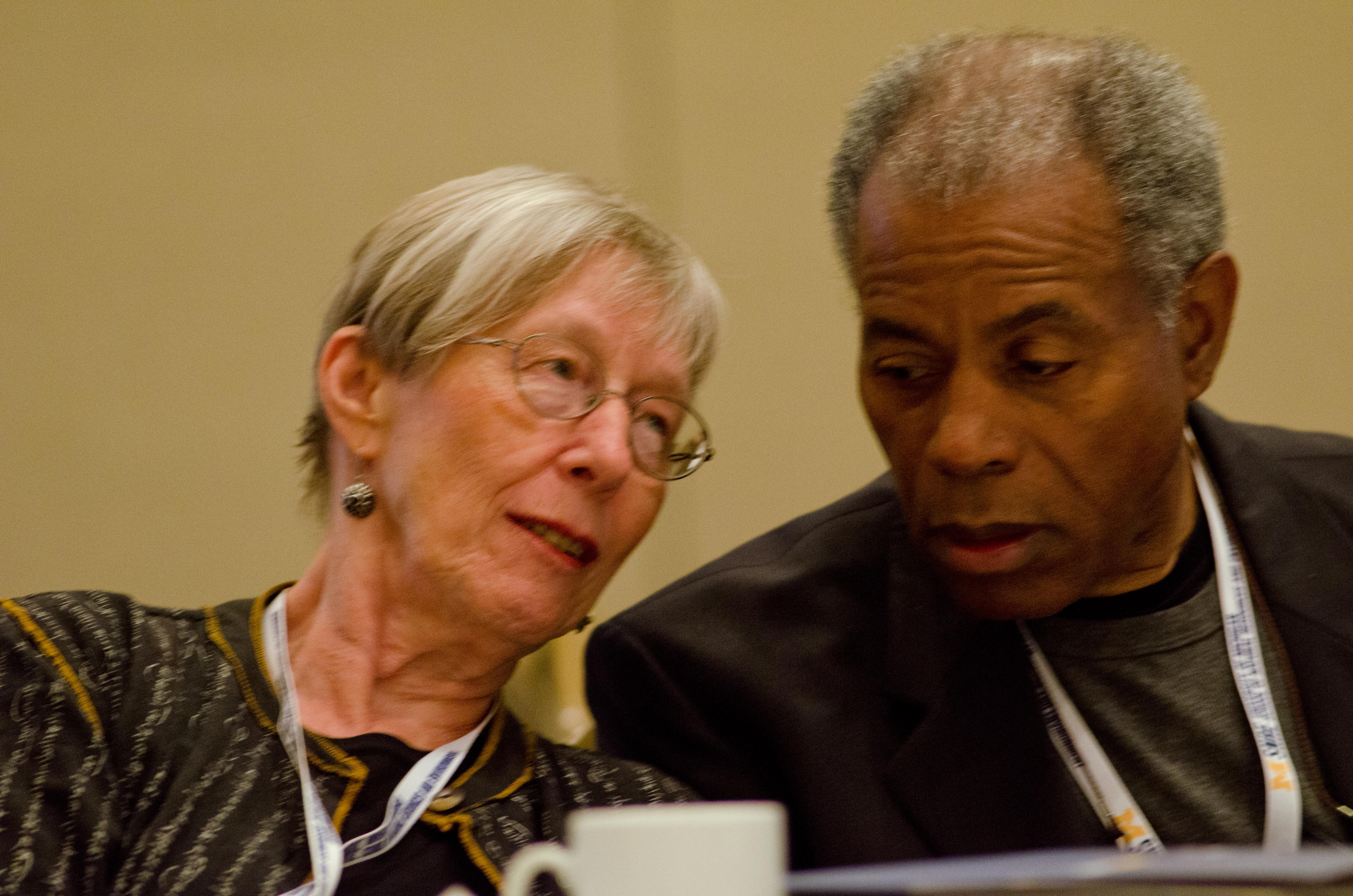
Bryant and his wife Jean Rae Carlberg

Bryant was married to Jean Rae Carlberg and they had no children together by choice. In 2006, he donated $100,000 to the School of Natural Resources and Environment's Environmental Justice Fund. Bryant was diagnosed with Parkinson's disease. Bryant died on March 23, 2024, at the age of 89.

== Selected publications ==
The following is a list of selected publications:

- Environmental Crisis or Crisis of Epistemology?: Working for Sustainable Knowledge and Environmental Justice. (2011)
- Is there a "race" effect on concern for environmental quality? (1998)
- Environmental justice: Issues, policies, and solutions (1995)
- Race and the incidence of environmental hazards: A time for discourse (1992)
- Environmental injustice: weighing race and class as factors in the distribution of environmental hazards (1992)
