= Gilbert L. Rochon =

American academic

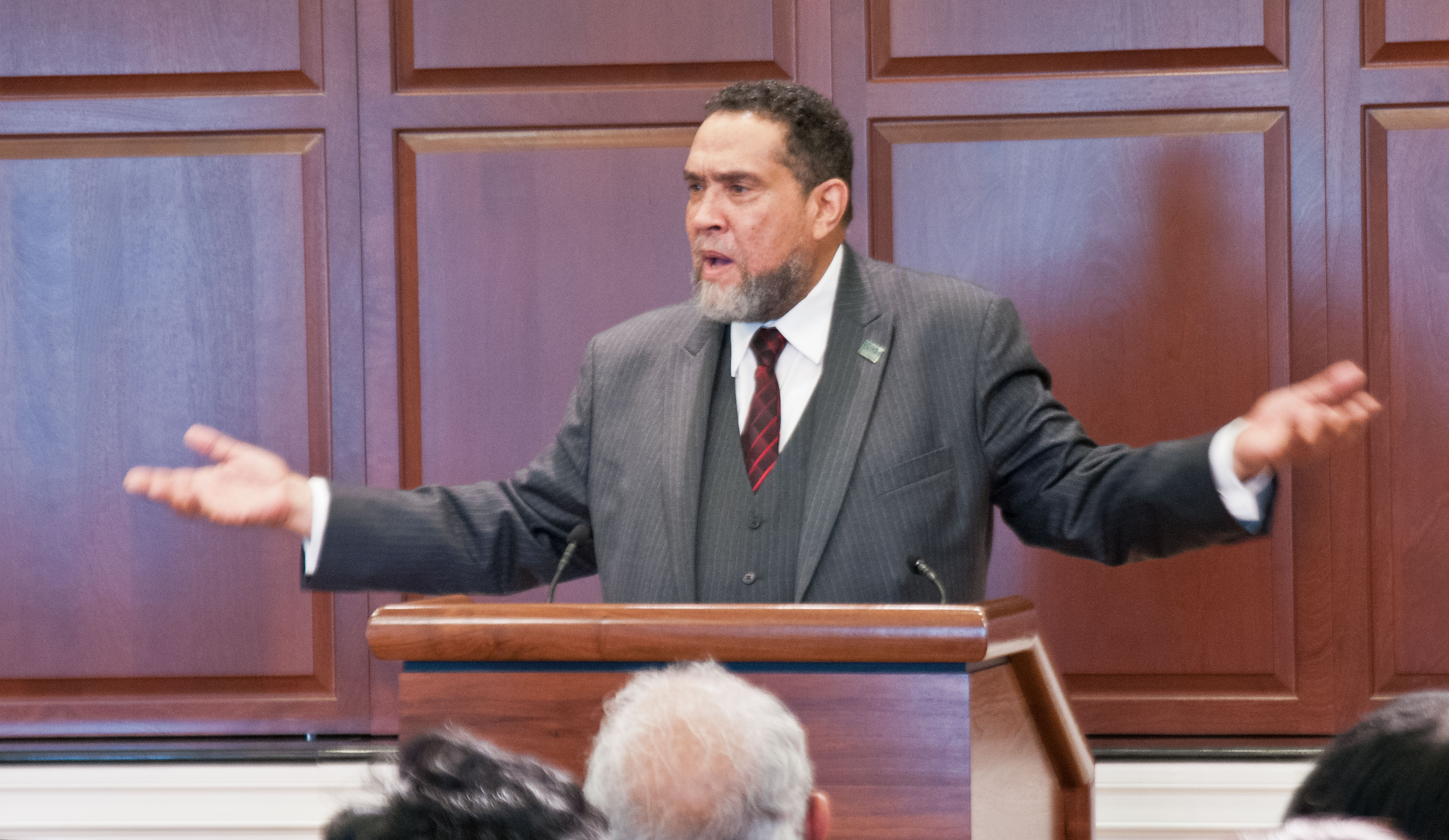

6th President of Tuskegee University
- In office November 1, 2010 – October 21, 2013

Personal details
- Born: New Orleans, Louisiana, U.S.
- Spouse: Patricia Saul Rochon
- Children: 2
- Relatives: Stephen W. Rochon (brother)
- Education: Xavier University of Louisiana; Yale School of Medicine; Massachusetts Institute of Technology (PhD)
- Occupation: Academic, educator

Gilbert L. Rochon is an American former academic and educator who served as the sixth president of Tuskegee University from 2010 to 2013.

== Early life and education ==
Born in New Orleans, Louisiana, Rochon grew up with his two brothers under the care of their mother and grandfather. He attended segregated Catholic parochial schools and later studied at seminaries in Mississippi and Iowa.

Rochon earned a Bachelor's degree from Xavier University of Louisiana, a Master of Public Health in health services administration from Yale University, and a Ph.D. in urban and regional planning from MIT, with research focused on satellite-based remote sensing applications for drought-related famine in Sudan.

== Career ==
Before his presidency at Tuskegee, Rochon held various academic and administrative positions. From 2002 to 2010, he worked at Purdue University, and from 2000 to 2002, he served as a researcher at the US Environmental Protection Agency’s National Risk Management Research Laboratory. Rochon also served as the director and chair of Urban Studies and Public Policy at Dillard University from 1982 to 2000.

== Personal life ==
Rochon is married to Patricia Saul Rochon, a former academic, and they have two children. He is Catholic.

== Publications ==
- Rochon, Gilbert L.; Thiam, Thierno (7 February 2013). "Democracy & Education: Evolution of the Tuskegee University Governance Model". In Harkavy, Ira; Bergan, Sjur; van't Land, Hilligje (eds.). Council of Europe Reimaging Democratic Societies: A New Era of Personal and Social Responsibility. Council of Europe. ISBN 978-92-871-7537-3.
- Rochon, Gilbert L. (September 2010). "Remote Sensing for Disaster Response". In Barney Warf; Piotr Jankowski; Barry Solomon; et al. (eds.). Encyclopedia of Geography. Sage Publications. ISBN 9781412956970.
