= National Environmental Justice Advisory Council =

Federal advisory committee to the US Environmental Protection Agency

Agency overview
- Formed: September 30, 1993
- Employees: 26 members and 1 Designated Federal Officer (DFO)
- Agency executive: Margaret J. May, Chairperson
- Parent agency: United States Environmental Protection Agency
- Website: Official site

The National Environmental Justice Advisory Council (NEJAC), a federal advisory committee to the United States Environmental Protection Agency, was established September 30, 1993. The Council provides advice and recommendations about broad, cross-cutting issues related to environmental justice, from all stakeholders involved in the environmental justice dialogue. In addition, the NEJAC provides a valuable forum for discussions about integrating environmental justice with other EPA priorities and initiatives. Margaret J. May serves as the current Chairperson.

The NEJAC also has seven subcommittees to help develop strategic options for EPA. These subcommittees report to the NEJAC Executive Council. Each subcommittee consists of approximately 6 to 13 individuals knowledgeable in the subject area. Members are drawn from the NEJAC Executive Council as well as from other stakeholder organizations. The subcommittees are: Air and Water; Enforcement; Health and Research; Indigenous Peoples; International; Puerto Rico; and Waste and Facility Siting. The committee was terminated on May 1st, 2025 as part of President Trump's Executive Order 14217.

== History ==
For the past 20 years, NEJAC has provided a valuable forum for discussions about integrating environmental justice into EPA's programs, policies, and activities. The NEJAC has worked to shape agency policy including recommendations for the 1996 Brownfields report on Unintended Impacts from Revitalization that created the national Brownfields conference, recommendations for improving stakeholder relations between Federal facilities and environmental justice communities, as well as the 2005 Gulf Coast Hurricanes and Vulnerable Populations Recommendations that helped shape the agency response to the Gulf Oil Spill.

== Current Organization ==
The NEJAC membership consists of representatives from academia, community groups, industry and business, state and local government, environmental organizations, as well as tribal governments and indigenous groups.

== Achievements ==
Following research and advice provided by the NEJAC and Robert D. Bullard, President Bill Clinton signed Executive Order 12898 in 1994, the purpose of which was to focus federal attention on the environmental and human health effects of federal actions on minority and low-income populations with the goal of achieving environmental justice and protection for all communities.
