= Barbara Jordan =

American politician, attorney, and educator (1936–1996)

- Jordan, c. 1972–1978

Member of the U.S. House of Representatives from Texas's 18th district
- In office January 3, 1973 – January 3, 1979
- Preceded by: Bob Price
- Succeeded by: Mickey Leland

Member of the Texas Senate from the 11th district
- In office January 10, 1967 – January 3, 1973
- Preceded by: Bill Moore
- Succeeded by: Chet Brooks

Personal details
- Born: Barbara Charline Jordan; February 21, 1936 Houston, Texas, U.S.
- Died: January 17, 1996 (aged 59) Austin, Texas, U.S.
- Resting place: Texas State Cemetery
- Party: Democratic
- Domestic partner: Nancy Earl (late 1960s–1996)
- Education: Texas Southern University (BA); Boston University (LLB)

Barbara Charline Jordan (February 21, 1936 – January 17, 1996) was an American politician, attorney, and educator. A member of the Democratic Party, she was the first Black person elected to the Texas Senate since Reconstruction, the first woman descendant of American slavery elected to the U.S. House of Representatives, and one of the first two Black people elected to the U.S. House from the former Confederacy since 1901, alongside Andrew Young of Georgia.

Known for her oratorial abilities, Jordan achieved national fame for her televised opening statement at the House Judiciary Committee hearings during the impeachment process against Richard Nixon. In 1976, she became the first Black woman, and the first woman, to deliver a keynote address at a Democratic National Convention. Together with other Black politicians in the south who were elected after the passage of the Voting Rights Act of 1965, she worked to transform the Democratic Party from a party of segregation into a vehicle for increased Black political participation and representation.

Following her retirement from Congress, Jordan taught at the University of Texas at Austin, delivered numerous public lectures, remained active in Democratic Party politics, and served as chair of the U.S. Commission on Immigration Reform. She received the Presidential Medal of Freedom, among numerous other honors. She was the first African-American woman to be buried in the Texas State Cemetery.

== Early life, family, and education ==
Barbara Charline Jordan was born in the Fifth Ward neighborhood of Houston, Texas. Jordan's childhood was centered on church life at the Good Hope Missionary Baptist Church. Her mother was Arlyne Patten Jordan, a teacher in the church and a maid. Her father was Benjamin Jordan, a Baptist preacher and a warehouse worker. Jordan would recite poetry at the church and would sing gospel music with her sisters. In 1949, Jordan's father joined the Greater Pleasant Hill Baptist Church as the full-time pastor.

Through her mother, Jordan was the great-granddaughter of Edward Patton, who was one of the last Black members of the Texas House of Representatives prior to disenfranchisement of Black Texans under Jim Crow. Barbara Jordan was the youngest of three children. Her older siblings were Rose Mary Jordan McGowan and Bennie Creswell Jordan (1933–2000).

Jordan attended Roberson Elementary School. She graduated from Phillis Wheatley High School in 1952 with honors. At Wheatley, Jordan's oratorical abilities were developed through the support of her teachers and curriculum. Major influences included her English teacher Mrs. D. B. Reid, elocutionist Ashton J. Oliver, and speech and drama teacher Robert T. Holland. Jordan credited a speech she heard in her high school years by Edith S. Sampson with inspiring her to become an attorney.

Educated in Houston's public schools before the Brown v. Board of Education decision, Jordan grew up in an era of continued racial segregation, but Houston civil rights activists in the NAACP won important victories that also shaped her early life, including a successful local campaign to equalize salaries for Black and white teachers in 1943. Smith v. Allwright, a 1944 Supreme Court case that overturned the white primary, began in Houston. In 1946, Houstonian Heman Sweatt challenged segregation in higher education by applying to law school at the University of Texas at Austin (UT). The state of Texas denied his admission on account of race and instead created a separate law school for Black students at Houston's Texas Southern University. In 1950, the Supreme Court ruling in Sweatt v. Painter required the law school in Austin to integrate, but the first Black undergraduates would not enroll at UT until 1956, four years after Jordan's high school graduation.

In the meantime, significant growth was occurring at Texas Southern University (TSU), where Jordan enrolled in 1952 and majored in political science and history. At TSU, Jordan pledged Delta Gamma chapter of Delta Sigma Theta sorority. She also became a national champion debater, learning from her coach, Thomas Freeman, defeating opponents from Yale and Brown, and tying a team from Harvard University. She graduated magna cum laude in 1956.

College experiences as a teenager made Jordan more acutely aware of Jim Crow's injustices. The commute from her Fifth Ward home to the Third Ward campus required a long ride on segregated buses, as she later recalled: "There was a little plaque on the bus near the back that said, 'colored' and when I'd get on, I'd have to go all the way back to that little plaque and I was passing empty seats all the time." On trips to debate competitions across the south, Jordan and fellow TSU students often stayed in Black-owned hotels or the homes of Black families because they were barred from segregated accommodations. Such experiences contributed to her decision to pursue her dream of becoming an attorney outside of Texas.

She attended Boston University School of Law, graduating in 1959.

== Early career ==
Jordan taught political science at Tuskegee Institute in Alabama for a year. In 1960, she returned to Houston and started a private law practice. During that time, the 24-year-old Jordan was one of only two black women attorneys in Texas. To start off her career, Jordan became the first Black woman to work as an administrative assistant to a county judge, Bill Elliott. Jordan began her work in politics in 1960 when she became a volunteer for the John F. Kennedy-Lyndon B. Johnson campaign, traveling to Black churches in Houston to encourage people to vote.

== Political career ==
=== Texas Senate ===
Jordan campaigned unsuccessfully in 1962 and 1964 for the Texas House of Representatives. In 1966, along with Curtis Graves and Joe Lockridge, she was one of three Black members elected to the Texas Legislature, the first ones since 1896. With Jordan elected to the Texas Senate, she became the first black woman to serve in that body. She served the Eleventh Senate District in Houston, which had just been created after Kilgarlin v. Martin (1965) in which the federal court demanded redistricting of the Texas Legislature because densely populated urban areas were underrepresented in comparison to rural areas. In a speech at Rice University following the district's creation, but before her election, Jordan said, "For the first time in Texas, we are going to have legislators who represent people, not cattle."

The Texas Senate in 1966 consisted of thirty white men and Jordan. With Jordan experiencing racism and sexism from her colleagues, Houston community members were unsure of how much of a difference Jordan could make serving in the Senate. Aware of the challenges she would face, Jordan's goal was to be respected by the white conservatives in the Senate. One of the ways she accomplished this was by befriending Dorsey Hardeman, who was seen as the most powerful man in the body, and Lieutenant Governor Ben Barnes. Jordan ran as a liberal Democrat, but she had strong relationships with the conservative wing of the Texas Democratic Party. Her efforts in her first term led to her being unanimously elected as outstanding freshman member by her colleagues.

Re-elected to a full term in the Texas Senate in 1968, Jordan served until 1972. She was the first African-American woman to serve as president pro tempore of the state senate and served one day, June 10, 1972, as acting governor of Texas. Jordan was the first African-American woman to serve as governor of a state. Additionally, Jordan was nominated to serve on federal commissions by President Lyndon Johnson after she was elected to the Senate; the commissions worked on housing and income maintenance. During her time in the Texas Legislature, Jordan sponsored or cosponsored some 70 bills. Jordan was an advocate for her constituents and the working class while in the Texas Senate. Some of her accomplishments include developing Texas' first minimum wage law and funding programs to fight against hate crimes.

Jordan's influence in the Senate and her relationship with Lieutenant Governor Ben Barnes shaped her path to U.S. Congress. Redistricting of Texas began after the 1970 census, which included the possibility of a new congressional seat in Houston. Barnes named Jordan vice-chair of the redistricting committee, and this resulted in Jordan having the ability to draw her own district, the Eighteenth Congressional District. Jordan received 81% of the vote in 1972 to win the Democratic nomination to the U.S. House seat.

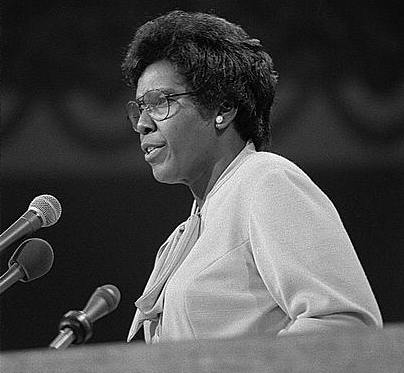
Barbara Jordan delivering the keynote address before the 1976 Democratic National Convention

=== U.S. House of Representatives ===
In 1972, Jordan was elected to the U.S. House of Representatives, the first woman elected in her own right to represent Texas in the House. She received extensive support from former President Lyndon B. Johnson, who helped her secure a position on the House Judiciary Committee. In 1974, she made an influential televised speech before the House Judiciary Committee supporting the impeachment of President Richard Nixon, Johnson's successor as president. In 1975, she was appointed by Carl Albert, then Speaker of the United States House of Representatives, to the Democratic Steering and Policy Committee.

In 1976, Jordan, mentioned as a possible running mate to Jimmy Carter of Georgia, became instead the first African-American woman to deliver a keynote address at the Democratic National Convention. Despite not being a candidate, Jordan received one delegate vote (0.03%) for president at the Convention.

In November 1977, Barbara Jordan spoke at the 1977 National Women's Conference in Houston, Texas. Other speakers included Rosalynn Carter, Betty Ford, Lady Bird Johnson, Bella Abzug, Audrey Colom, Claire Randall, Gerridee Wheeler, Cecilia Burciaga, Gloria Steinem, Lenore Hershey and Jean O'Leary.

=== American Oratory and Statement on Articles of Impeachment ===
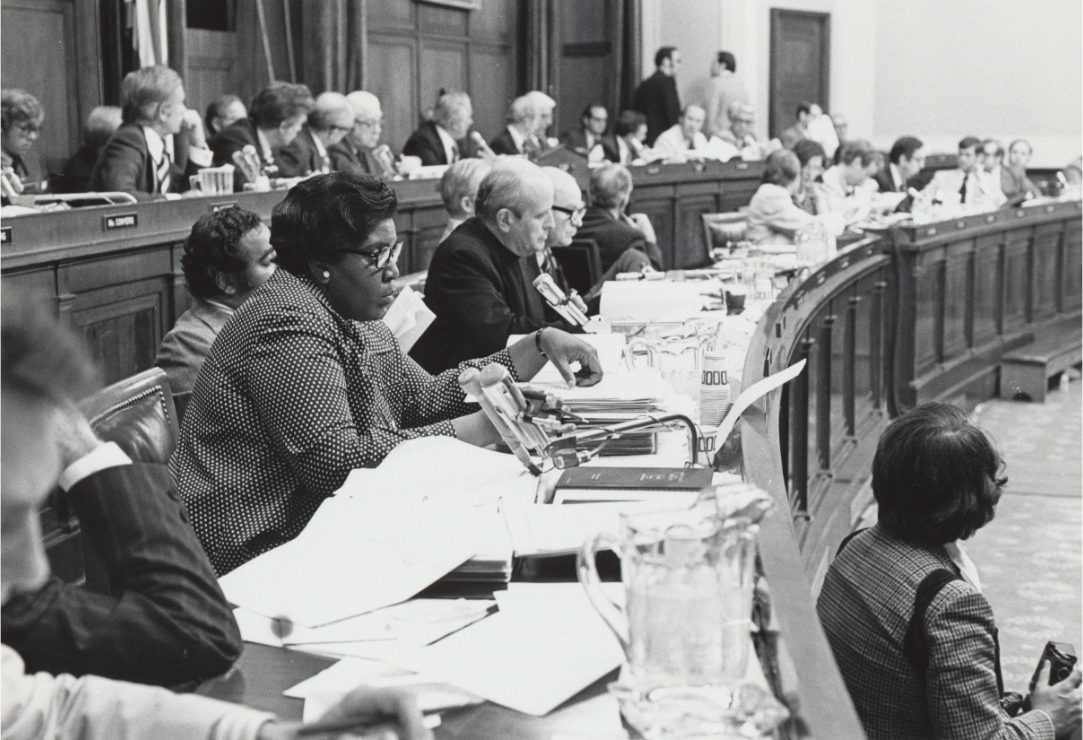
Representative Barbara Jordan (left) became nationally known for her eloquence during the Judiciary Committee's impeachment hearings.

On July 25, 1974, Jordan delivered a 15-minute televised speech in front of the members of the U.S. House Judiciary Committee during the hearings that were part of the impeachment process against Richard Nixon.

Throughout her Judiciary Committee impeachment speech, Jordan framed the committee's hearing as consistent with the Constitution of the United States, and she began by calling attention to the significance of her own relationship to the preamble. While the document's original drafters may not have envisioned her as a part of "We, the people," "through the process of amendment, interpretation, and court decision, I have finally been included". She continued:

Today I am an inquisitor. An hyperbole would not be fictional and would not overstate the solemnness that I feel right now. My faith in the Constitution is whole; it is complete; it is total. And I am not going to sit here and be an idle spectator to the diminution, the subversion, the destruction, of the Constitution.

Throughout her statement, Jordan never directly said that she wanted Nixon impeached, but she made the case for that step by comparing the criteria for impeachment with the president's actions. She defended the checks and balances system, which was set in place to inhibit any politician from abusing their power. She stated facts that proved Nixon to be untrustworthy and involved in illegal behavior, and she quoted the drafters of the Constitution to argue that actions like Nixon's during the scandal corresponded with their understanding of impeachable offenses. This powerful and influential statement earned Jordan national praise for her rhetoric, morals, and wisdom. Further, both conservatives and liberals liked Jordan because of her appeal to the American Dream and her positions on Watergate and the Voting Rights Act respectively.

=== 1976 Democratic National Convention Keynote ===
On July 12, 1976, Jordan delivered a historic keynote address at the 1976 Democratic National Convention. This address was the first time a major political party's nominating convention had a Black person as the keynote speaker. Jordan was chosen as a speaker because she was a Democratic member of the Judiciary Committee and made an impact with her remarks during the impeachment process of Nixon. Additionally, Jordan represented the Democratic party's progress and acceptance of minorities as a black woman. Jordan's usage of American values in her address, primarily national unity, American traditions, and the importance of politicians as responsible public servants, appealed to the general public and led to a largely positive reaction. At Madison Square Garden, where the convention was held, Jordan's address ended with a 5-minute standing ovation, and during her speech, the audience interrupted with applause 20 times.

Many delegates wanted Jordan to become Jimmy Carter's running mate and wore ‘‘Barbara Jordan for Vice President’’ buttons the following day of the convention. One of the messages of Jordan's speech was support for the Democratic Party, including what they have done in the past and what they could accomplish in the future. Some have linked Jordan's speech and her support of the Democratic Party as playing a role in Carter's election win, with Carter winning 92% of the Black vote. During a time of unrest, following the Watergate scandal and the Vietnam war, Carter hoped to unite both the Democratic Party and the country, and Carter tasked Jordan with helping him accomplish this goal at the convention.

After the election, Jordan was considered a contender for and actively sought the post of Attorney General. Carter instead offered Jordan the post of UN Ambassador, but Jordan declined on the grounds that she would not take a job that was not "consistent with my background." Griffin Bell ultimately became Attorney General, and another Black politician, Andrew Young, became UN Ambassador.

=== Legislation ===
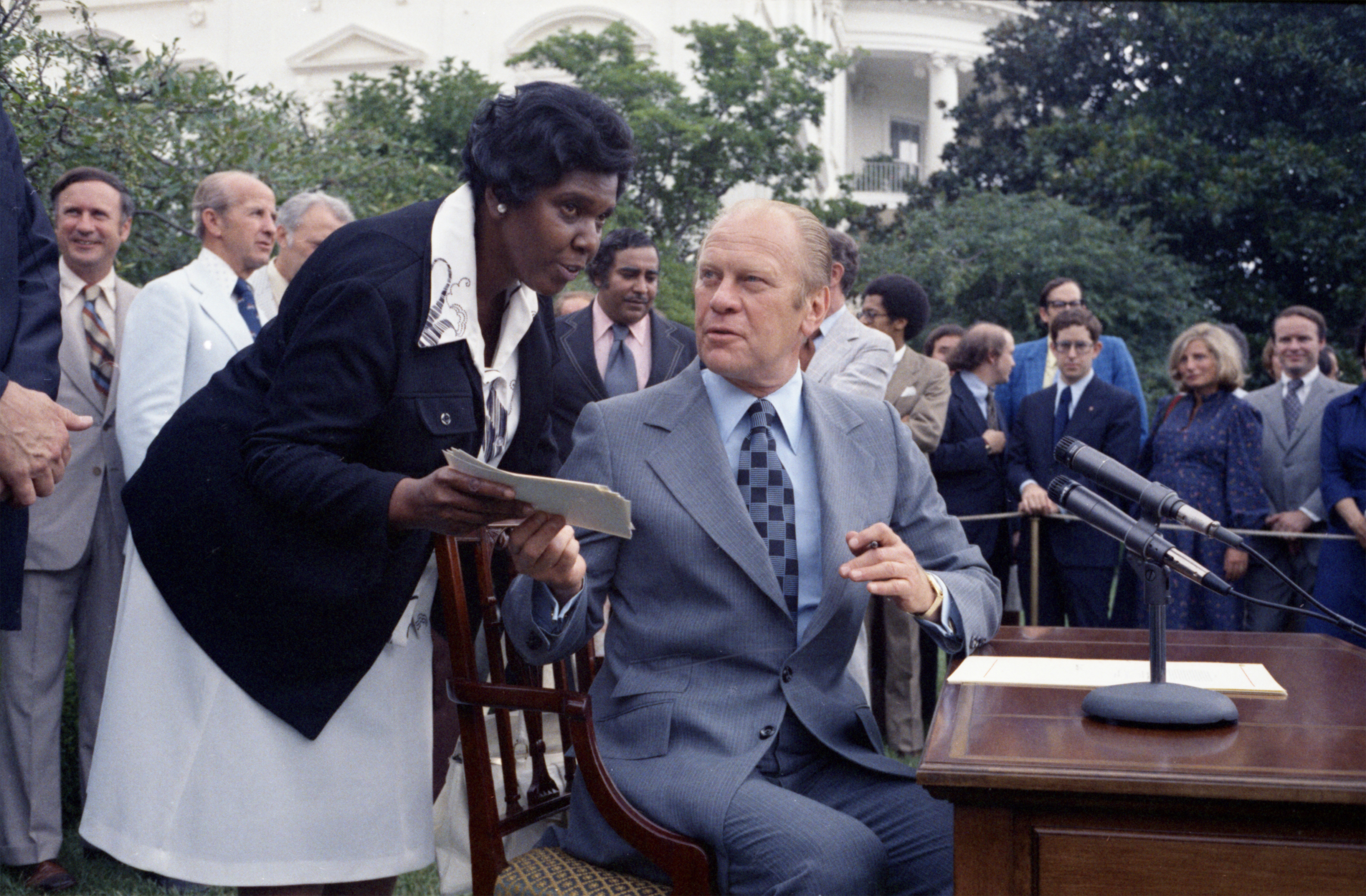
Jordan with President Gerald R. Ford at the Signing of H.R. 6219, Extending the Voting Rights Act of 1965 (1975)

Jordan supported the Community Reinvestment Act of 1977, legislation that required banks to lend and make services available to underserved poor and minority communities. She supported the renewal of the Voting Rights Act of 1965 and expansion of that act to cover language minorities; this extended protection to Hispanics in Texas and was opposed by Texas Governor Dolph Briscoe and Secretary of State Mark White. The original version of the Voting Rights Act of 1965 included section 5, which required that changes to voting laws in certain jurisdictions were required to be reviewed by the Attorney General or the United States District Court, but this did not apply to Texas because the state was not included in the determined jurisdictions. The law changed to include Texas under the expanded version along with the requirement of bilingual ballots for areas where "more than five percent of the population" spoke a language other than English.

She also authored an act that ended federal authorization of price fixing by manufacturers. Jordan was also a proponent of the Equal Rights Amendment and issued a statement in support of extending the deadline in 1979. During Jordan's tenure as a Congresswoman, she sponsored or cosponsored over 300 bills or resolutions, several of which are still in effect today as law.

== Post-political career ==
Jordan retired from politics in 1978 due to poor health and became an adjunct professor teaching at the University of Texas at Austin Lyndon B. Johnson School of Public Affairs. She was again a keynote speaker at the Democratic National Convention in 1992.

In 1994, President Bill Clinton awarded her the Presidential Medal of Freedom and the NAACP presented her with the Spingarn Medal. She was honored many times and was given over 20 honorary degrees from institutions across the country, including Harvard and Princeton, and was elected to the Texas and National Women's Halls of Fame.

=== U.S. Commission on Immigration Reform ===
From 1994 until her death, Jordan chaired the U.S. Commission on Immigration Reform; she was appointed by President Bill Clinton. The commission recommended that total immigration be cut by one-third, to approximately 550,000 per year. The commission supported increasing enforcement against undocumented migrants and their employers, eliminating visa preferences for siblings and adult children of U.S. citizens, and ending unskilled immigration except for refugees and nuclear families. The commission's report to Congress said that it was "a right and responsibility of a democratic society to manage immigration so that it serves the national interest", concluded that "legal immigration has strengthened and can continue to strengthen this country" and "decrie[d] hostility and discrimination against immigrants as antithetical to the traditions and interests of the country." The commission recommended that the United States reduce the number of refugees admitted annually to a floor of 50,000 (this level would be lifted during emergencies).

== Personal life ==
=== Relationships ===
While Jordan never publicly identified herself as lesbian or queer, the U.S. National Archives has referred to her as the first LGBTQ+ woman to serve in the United States Congress.

Jordan and Nancy Earl (1933-2007) shared a home in Austin, Texas and maintained a close bond for 20 years. Jordan's political career was often shadowed by homophobic attacks, with advisors cautioning against the visibility of her personal relationships. With their advice, Jordan's openness about her sexual orientation was limited to private settings. Jordan held a negative view on marriage and viewed it as a life of subservience. She believed that her family would accept her choice to be single only if she had a successful career.

=== Health ===
Jordan developed multiple sclerosis in 1973, during her first year in Congress.

On July 31, 1988, Jordan nearly drowned in her backyard swimming pool while doing physical therapy. She was saved by Earl, who found her floating in the pool and revived her. By the late 1980s, Jordan used a wheelchair due to her multiple sclerosis.

In the KUT-FM radio documentary Rediscovering Barbara Jordan, President Bill Clinton said that he had wanted to nominate Jordan for the United States Supreme Court, but that Jordan's health problems prevented him from doing so.

== Death and burial ==
External videos
- Funeral of Barbara Jordan, Good Hope Missionary Baptist Church, Houston, Texas, January 20, 1996, C-SPAN

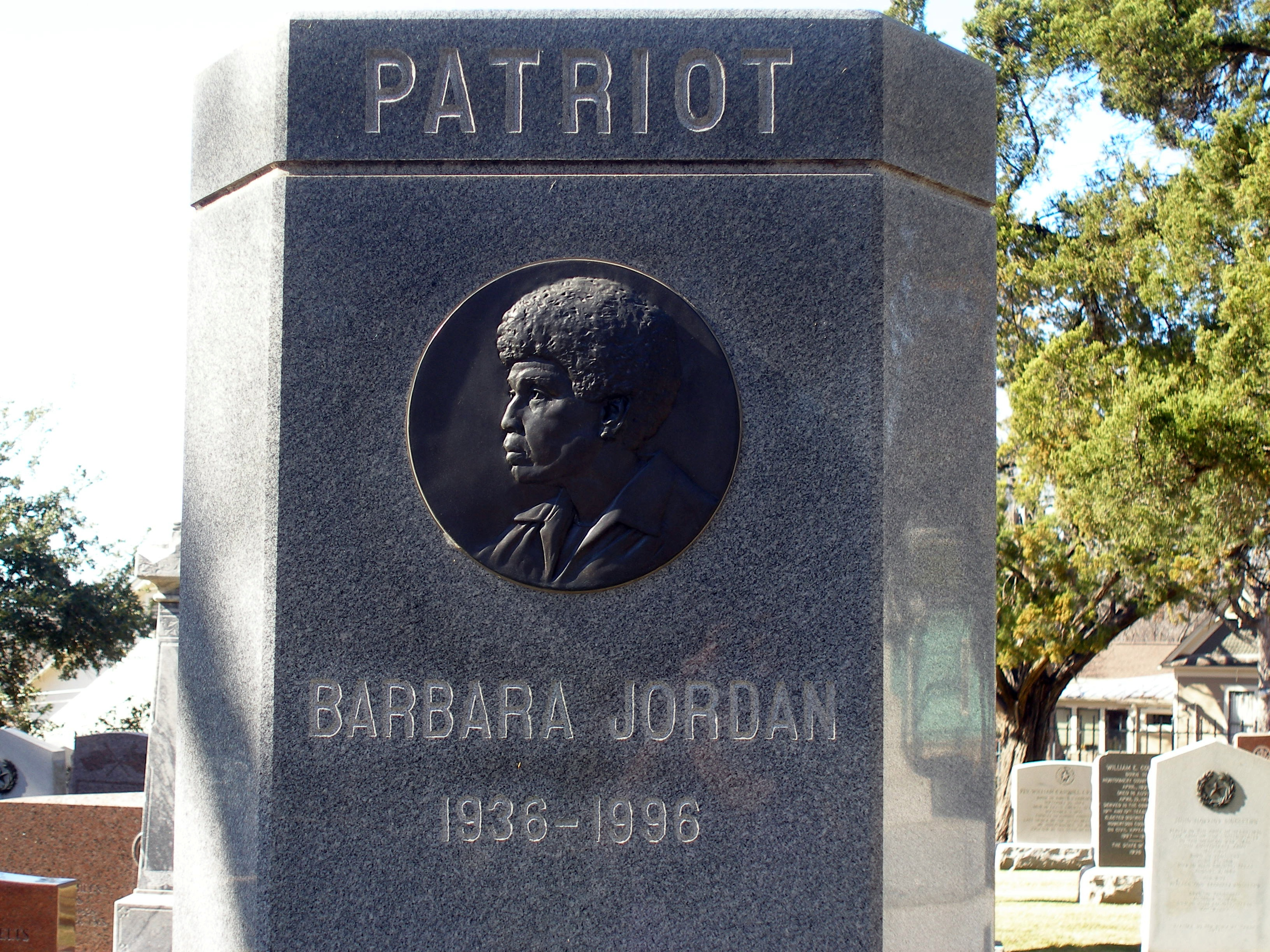
Barbara Jordan's gravestone at the Texas State Cemetery in Austin, Texas

Jordan died at the Austin Diagnostic Medical Center in Austin, Texas, on January 17, 1996, at the age of 59. Her cause of death was complications from pneumonia and leukemia. She had battled multiple sclerosis for several years before her death.

Jordan was interred in Texas State Cemetery. She was the first Black person to receive this honor. During her tenure in the Texas State Senate, Jordan had advocated for Black persons to be buried in the state cemetery. Jordan's grave rests near that of the "Father of Texas", Stephen F. Austin.

In the years following Jordan's passing, more Black persons would receive the honor of being buried in the Texas State Cemetery as well, including musical artists James Henry Cotton and Barbara Smith Conrad, and fellow Texas-based U.S. Congresswoman Eddie Bernice Johnson.

== Recognition and legacy ==
- 1984: Inducted into the Texas Women's Hall of Fame
- 1990: Inducted into the National Women's Hall of Fame
- 1992: The Spingarn Medal from the NAACP
- 1993: The Elizabeth Blackwell Award from Hobart and William Smith Colleges
- 1994: The Presidential Medal of Freedom
- 1995: The second ever female awardee of the United States Military Academy's Sylvanus Thayer Award

Jordan was a member of the Peabody Awards Board of Jurors from 1978 to 1980.

=== Texas ===
The main terminal at Austin-Bergstrom International Airport is named after Jordan. The airport also features a statue of Jordan by artist Bruce Wolfe.

A boulevard in central Austin is named after Jordan. Several schools bear her name, including elementary schools in Dallas, Texas, Odessa, Texas, Austin, Texas, Barbara Jordan Early College Prep School, Richmond, Texas, Barbara C. Jordan Intermediate School, a middle school in Cibolo, Texas, Barbara Jordan Career Center in Houston, and The Barbara Jordan Institute for Policy Research at her undergraduate alma mater Texas Southern University. There is also a park named after Jordan in Needville, Texas (The Barbara Jordan Park).

The Kaiser Family Foundation operates the Barbara Jordan Health Policy Scholars, a fellowship designed for people of color who are college juniors, seniors, and recent graduates as a summer experience working in a congressional office.

On April 24, 2009, a statue of Barbara Jordan was unveiled at the University of Texas at Austin, where Jordan taught at the time of her death. The Barbara Jordan statue campaign was paid for by a student fee increase approved by the University of Texas Board of Regents. The effort was originally spearheaded by the 2002–2003 Tappee class of the Texas Orange Jackets, the "oldest women's organization at the University" (of Texas at Austin). Created by Bruce Wolfe, the statue stands on the campus's West Mall near the Student Union in 2009. One of her speeches is inscribed on granite slabs behind the statue, with some of her accomplishments also being listed.

The Barbara Jordan Public-Private Leadership Award is presented by Texas Southern University's School of Public Affairs and School of Law. Its first recipient was former U.S. Secretary of State Hillary Clinton, on June 4, 2015.

In 2023, the fiftieth anniversary of Jordan's election to Congress, a meditative monument to Jordan was completed by artists Jamal Cyrus and Charisse Pearlina Weston at the African American Library at the Gregory School in Houston. Later that year, a sculpture representing Jordan and created by artist Angelbert Metoyer was unveiled outside the former Barbara Jordan Post Office in Houston, TX. The former sorting facility named after Jordan opened in 1962.

Texas designated an 8-mile strip along Houston's Third Ward of State Highway 288, SH288, the Barbara Jordan Memorial Parkway.

=== Missouri ===
An elementary school in University City School District is named after her, Barbara C. Jordan Elementary in University City, Missouri.

=== Other honors ===
In 2000, the Jordan/Rustin Coalition (JRC) was created, honoring Jordan and Bayard Rustin, a leader in the civil rights movement and close confidante of Martin Luther King Jr. The organization mobilized gay and lesbian Black people to aid in the passage of marriage equality in the state of California. According to its website, "the mission [of the JRC] is to empower Black same-gender loving, lesbian, gay, bisexual and transgender individuals and families in Greater Los Angeles, to promote equal marriage rights and to advocate for fair treatment of everyone without regard to race, sexual orientation, gender identity, or gender expression."

On March 27, 2000, a play based on Jordan's life premiered at the Victory Garden Theater in Chicago, Illinois. Entitled Voice of Good Hope, Kristine Thatcher's biographical evocation of Jordan's life played in theaters from San Francisco to New York.

In 2011, the Barbara Jordan Forever Stamp was issued. It is the 34th stamp in the Black Heritage series of U.S. stamps.

In 2012, Jordan was inducted into the Legacy Walk, an outdoor public display which celebrates LGBTQ history and people.

The Barbara Jordan Media Awards are given annually to media professionals and students who "have produced material for the public which accurately and positively reports on individuals with disabilities, using People First language and respectful depictions".

== See also ==
- History of the African-Americans in Houston
- List of African-American United States representatives
- List of first women lawyers and judges in Texas
- Texas African American History Memorial, Texas State Capitol
- Women in the United States House of Representatives

Texas Senate
Preceded by Bill Moore	Member of the Texas Senate from the 11th district 1967–1973	Succeeded by Chet Brooks
U.S. House of Representatives
Preceded by Bob Price	Member of the U.S. House of Representatives from Texas's 18th congressional district 1973–1979	Succeeded by Mickey Leland
Party political offices
Preceded by Reubin Askew	Keynote Speaker of the Democratic National Convention; 1976; Served alongside: John Glenn	Succeeded by Mo Udall
Preceded by Ann Richards	Keynote Speaker of the Democratic National Convention; 1992; Served alongside: Bill Bradley, Zell Miller	Succeeded by Evan Bayh
