= Jeffrey Montgomery =

American LGBT rights activist (1953–2016)

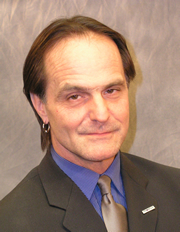
- Born: May 9, 1953; Detroit, Michigan, U.S.
- Died: July 18, 2016 (aged 63); Detroit, Michigan, U.S.
- Education: Michigan State University
- Occupations: Public relations; US lesbian, gay, bisexual and transgender (LGBTQ) activist
- Political party: Democratic
- Movement: LGBT movement in the US
- Relatives: James Montgomery (brother)
- Website: jeffreymontgomery.org

Jeffrey Montgomery (May 9, 1953 – July 18, 2016) was an American LGBTQ activist and public relations executive. In 1984, his partner, Michael, was shot to death outside a Detroit gay bar, prompting Montgomery to engage in LGBT advocacy. He started work on LGBT anti-violence issues upon learning that the police were not spending many resources on solving the murder, "just another gay killing". In 1991 Montgomery became the founding executive director of the Triangle Foundation, and served until September 2007. Initially engaging in victim advocacy around LGBT violence, and to improve handling of LGBT related cases, the foundation's work expanded to LGBT civil rights and advocacy, with projects for anti-violence, media activism, and legislative education on LGBT civil rights. He became nationally known for his work and served at numerous organizations.

== Personal life ==
Montgomery was born in Detroit, Michigan on May 9, 1953. He grew up in nearby Grosse Pointe and graduated in 1971 from Grosse Pointe South High School, where he had served as student body president. His father, John Montgomery, worked for Chrysler as a public relations executive. His older brother, James Montgomery, is an American blues musician, best known as the lead singer, blues harp player, frontman, and bandleader of The James Montgomery Blues Band (a.k.a. The James Montgomery Band). His other brother, John Montgomery, also worked in the music industry before becoming an entrepreneur in the Metro Detroit area.

He graduated from Michigan State University in 1976 with a bachelor's degree in social science. In 1975, while attending Michigan State, he worked as the student house manager and head usher of the university's auditorium. He moved to Detroit after graduating and remained a resident of Detroit for the remainder of his life.

In 1984, his partner, Michael, was shot to death outside a Detroit gay bar, prompting Montgomery to engage in LGBT advocacy.

Montgomery died from a heart attack at the age of 63 on July 18, 2016 at Harper University Hospital in Detroit. Friends reported that his health had been declining in the preceding years.

== Professional life ==
Montgomery worked for approximately thirteen years, until January 1989, on the restoration of Detroit's Orchestra Hall.

He worked as public relations director of America's Thanksgiving Parade. He was serving in this role in 1989 when the parade moved back to the Gnome block and in 1990, when for the first time a balloon escaped from the parade.

=== Triangle Foundation ===
In 1991, he joined Henry D. Messer and John Monahan in founding the Triangle Foundation (now Equality Michigan). He worked as the organization's president, interim executive director, and eventually executive director until September 2007.

The organization was initially founded to engage in victim advocacy around LGBT violence, and work with police and prosecutors to improve the handling of LGBT related cases. The organization soon expanded to include work on discrimination cases, and then political advocacy following the closure of the Michigan Organization for Human Rights. By 2003, the organization had grown to five paid staff and hundreds of volunteers, and had helped about 5,000 victims of LGBT-related discrimination, harassment, or violence.

He made the formal announcement of his departure as executive director at the organization's 2007 annual dinner on September 29, 2007.

== Political activism ==
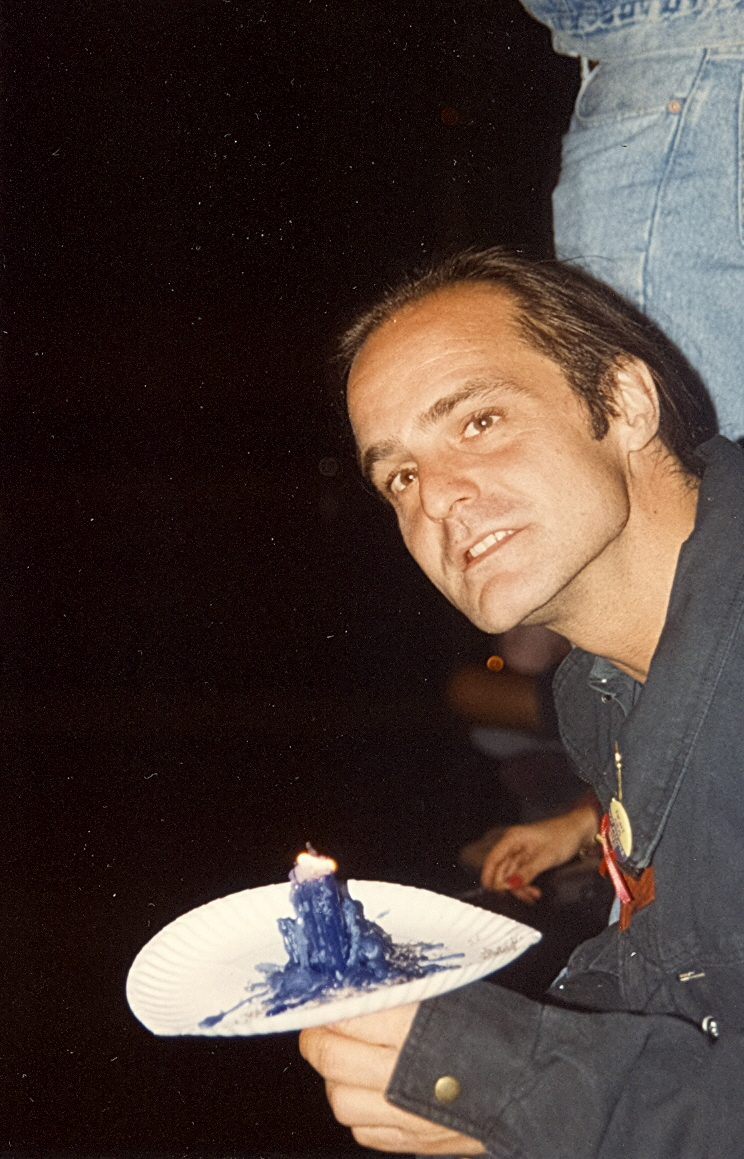
Jeffrey Montgomery attends The NAMES Project's AIDS Quilt Memorial Display Candlelight Vigil at the Lincoln Memorial on October 10, 1992.

Following the murder of his partner, Michael, in 1984, Montgomery began to engage in LGBT advocacy. He was motivated to work on LGBT anti-violence issues after learning from a Wayne County prosecutor a day after Michael's funeral that the Detroit Police Department was not spending many resources on solving the murder, calling it "just another gay killing". As of July 2016, Michael's murder remains unsolved.

Montgomery was widely quoted in media outlets on LGBT issues and high-profile LGBT-related crimes, such as the murder of Scott Amedure in 1995, and murder of Matthew Shepard. National LGBT organizations paid for Montgomery to attend the trials of Shepard's killers. In 2001, Montgomery was a featured participant in an A&E Network documentary about the Matthew Shepard case.

Montgomery was the co-chair of the National Coalition of Anti-Violence Programs (NCAVP), for which he was also a national spokesperson. He was also a member of the Steering Committee of the Michigan Alliance Against Hate Crimes, the Bias Crime Response Task Force of the Michigan Commission on Civil Rights, and a board member of the ACLU of Michigan.

He was one of the founding board members of the Woodhull Freedom Foundation (also known as the Woodhull Sexual Freedom Alliance) in 2003, and remained active with the organization until his death. He was also an inaugural member of the WikiQueer Global Advisory Board and served as Strategic Counsel to the wiki's parent organization, The Aequalitas Project.

Montgomery was among a group of LGBT activists, representing NCAVP, invited to Washington, D.C. for meetings beginning in 1997 with senior policy officials at the White House.

In 2000, he delivered the inaugural Matthew Shepard Memorial Lecture at Brown University. That address, "America...You Kill Me", was dedicated to Matthew Shepard.

In 2002, Montgomery was invited, with other LGBT leaders from across the country, to meet with and inform United States Senators about the issues and challenges facing the LGBT community.

In 2004, he helped organize opposition to Michigan's same-sex marriage constitutional amendment, passed later that year.

In the years prior to his death, he was working on a feature-length documentary showcasing his work in Detroit's LGBT community. The film, America You Kill Me, premiered at the Freep Film Festival in Detroit on April 28, 2022.

== Honors ==
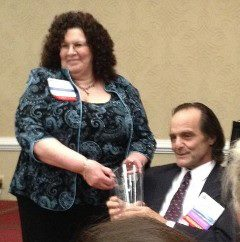
Montgomery accepting the Vicki Sexual Freedom Award in 2012 from Ricci Joy Levy

The Detroit City Council honored Montgomery with the "Spirit of Detroit" award three times. The Michigan Legislature twice commended Montgomery with special tributes.

In 1997, he received a Golden Apple Award from the Roeper School.

In August 1999, Montgomery was named one of the "Best and Brightest" national LGBT activists by The Advocate magazine.

Montgomery was named, along with twelve others, a "Michiganian of the Year" for 2002 by the Detroit News, stating "He turned personal tragedy into a fight for gay equality".

In May 2003, Michigan Governor Jennifer M. Granholm honored his work with a special tribute, calling him a "hero and living legend". The governor also noted that he was "among the most visible and accomplished advocates for safety and equality of gay, lesbian, bisexual and transgender people in Michigan history".

He received the Liberty Bell Award from the State Bar of Michigan at their annual meeting in September 2006.

Montgomery accepted the Lifetime Achievement Award at the Pride Banquet and Awards Ceremony in Warren, Michigan on June 25, 2010.

In September 2012, the Woodhull Sexual Freedom Alliance honored Montgomery with its Vicki Sexual Freedom Award.

In June 2019, Montgomery was one of the inaugural fifty American "pioneers, trailblazers, and heroes" inducted on the National LGBTQ Wall of Honor within the Stonewall National Monument (SNM) in New York City's Stonewall Inn. The SNM is the first U.S. national monument dedicated to LGBTQ rights and history, and the wall's unveiling was timed to take place during the 50th anniversary of the Stonewall riots.
