= James Montgomery (singer) =

American musician

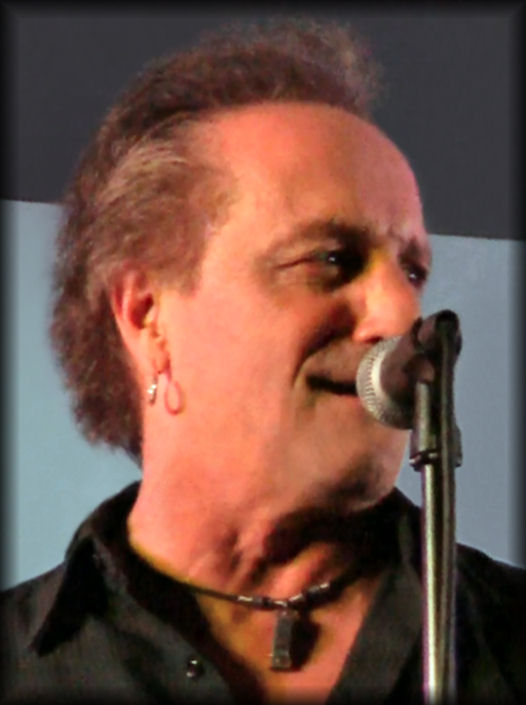
- James Montgomery singing at The Reel Blues Fest on May 12, 2012

Background information
- Born: May 12, 1949 (age 76)
- Origin: Detroit, Michigan, United States
- Genres: Blues
- Occupation(s): Musician, bandleader, composer, arranger
- Instrument(s): Vocalist, blues harp
- Years active: 1970–present
- Website: www.reverbnation.com/jamesmontgomeryblues www.myspace.com/jamesmontgomeryblues www.jamesmontgomery.com www.twitter.com/jm_blues

James Montgomery (born May 12, 1949) is an American blues musician, best known as the lead singer, blues harp player, frontman, and bandleader of The James Montgomery Blues Band (a.k.a. The James Montgomery Band). Montgomery collaborates with many star performers and recording artists. He is also the past President of The New England Blues Society.

== Personal life ==
James Montgomery was born on May 12, 1949, in Detroit, Michigan. He grew up there where his father, John Montgomery, worked for Chrysler as a public relations executive. One of his brothers, John Montgomery, also worked in the music industry before becoming an entrepreneur in the Metro Detroit area. His younger brother, Jeffrey Montgomery, was an LGBT activist, primarily known for being the founding executive director of Triangle Foundation (today Equality Michigan).

== Music career ==
While attending Boston University, where he earned a degree in English literature, Montgomery started the James Montgomery Band. His freshman roommate was Jeff Baxter. During his junior year, he was hired by the Colwell-Winfield Blues Band to play harmonica and tour with Janis Joplin. By the time he graduated from college his band was on the cover of the Boston Phoenix, heralded along with J. Geils and Aerosmith as the city's great contributions to the music world. Though he said "he loved the academic life, when offered a $15,000 job at Boston University, Montgomery instead took a $250,000 offer to record and tour with the Allman Brothers, and never looked back", according to Pamela Marean, Standard-Times correspondent, on September 6, 2007.

In 1970, Montgomery formed The James Montgomery Band. His harmonica playing, singing and energetic stage show led to his band gaining a reputation as one of the hottest bands on the New England music scene. Montgomery was signed by Capricorn Records to a multi-album deal, and released his first album titled First Time Out (1973). The original LP recordings were remastered and released as an Audio CD in October 20, 1998, by Capricorn / Umgd. Track 9 off his first album titled "Train" was a fan favorite and became the number one song on WBCN (FM). They played it every day at noon-time for over a year. In 2011, Montgomery used "Train" as part of his encore at shows.

Montgomery has toured with many artists, including Aerosmith, The J. Geils Band, Bonnie Raitt, Bruce Springsteen, The Allman Brothers, The Steve Miller Band, The Johnny Winter Band, The Blues Brothers with (Jim Belushi and Dan Aykroyd) and others.

Montgomery has performed on stage with musicians including B.B. King, Muddy Waters, Buddy Guy, John Lee Hooker, Junior Wells, James Cotton, Bonnie Raitt, Steven Tyler, Brad Whitford, Charlie Daniels, Gregg Allman, LaVern Baker, Patti LaBelle, Jonathan Edwards, Jerome Geils, Peter Wolf, Magic Dick, Danny Klein, Huey Lewis, Kim Wilson, Elliot Easton, Johnny A., Rick Derringer, Ricky Byrd, Rob Kogut, Barry Goudreau, Fran Sheehan, Sib Hashian, Chad Smith, Billy Squier, Michael Carabello, Jon Butcher, Bruce Marshall, Dennis "Fly" Amero, Duke Robillard, Jon Pousette-Dart, Kate Taylor, Christine Ohlman, Mike Finnigan, Grace Kelly, The Uptown Horns, James Brown, The Rolling Stones, and Joe Cocker.

Montgomery recalls the night he played with Muddy Waters at Paul's Mall in Boston, Massachusetts. "I couldn't believe it. Here I was on stage with Muddy Waters," Montgomery recalls with a smile. "It was such a great feeling".

He had his own syndicated radio show for five years called Backstage With the Blues on these stations:

- WJZS Swing 99.3 FM Block Island, Rhode Island
- WADK 1540 AM Newport, Rhode Island and Fall River, Massachusetts
- WFNX (92.1 FM) Portland, Maine and Portsmouth, New Hampshire
- KUSH 1600, Cushing, Oklahoma

The show combined blues music along with the stories behind the music, told by the musicians themselves. Some of his special guests were John Lee Hooker, James Cotton, Dr. John, Bonnie Raitt, Koko Taylor, Ruth Brown, Otis Clay, Son Seals, Duke Robillard, Rod Piazza, and many more.

== James Montgomery Blues Band (a.k.a. James Montgomery Band) ==
During the past 45 years, Montgomery's band has been a springboard for many musicians careers. His band members have included Billy Squier, Wayne Kramer, Jeff Golub, Jim McCarty, Nunzio Signore, Steve Strout, Jeff Pevar, Bobby Chouinard, Ted Nugent, Billy Squier, Jeff Levine, Tom Gambel, George McCann and David Hull.

== Discography ==
List of albums, with tracks, and select notes
Title	Group / Performer	Release	Record label	Tracks with Montgomery	Notes
From Detroit to the Delta	James Montgomery Band	2013 February 19 Audio CD	Vizztone / Universal Records	1. Intoxicated; 2. Same Thing; 3. Little Johnny (featuring Johnny Winter); 4. Motor City Is Burning; 5. I Don't Want To Have A Heart; 6. Delta Storm; 7. Who Do You Love? (featuring DMC); 8. Put Your Money Where Your Mouth Is; 9. Hit The Road Jack; 10. River's Edge; 11. Changing of the Guard; 12. Black Cadillac (featuring James Cotton)	James Montgomery ~ Lead Vocals, Harmonica; Brad Whitford ~ Guitarist for Aerosmith; Joey Kramer ~ Drummer for Aerosmith; Johnny Winter ~ Slide Guitar; James Cotton ~ Harmonica; David Hull ~ Bass, Backup Vocals, producer; George McCann ~ Guitar, Backup Vocals; Seth Pappas ~ Drums, Percussion, Backup Vocals; Darryl "DMC" McDaniels ~ Rapper for the band "Run DMC"; The Uptown Horns ~ famous 4-man horn section from Manhattan, New York
In Style	James Montgomery Band	2010 April 1 Album	On the K-Tel Record Label	1. Hang On To Love; 2. Teasin' You; 3. Steppin' (Out In Style)	James Montgomery ~ Lead Vocals, Harmonica
Misspent Youth	Bruce Marshall Group	2010 Audio CD	ATM Records	3. 3 Chords and the Truth	Bruce Marshall ~ Lead Vocals, Electric, Acoustic and Dobro Guitars; James Montgomery ~ Harmonica; Ed Grenga ~ Hammond Organ, Piano; Dave Cournoyer ~ Guitars, Bass, Production; John Donahoe ~ Fiddle, Saxophone; Jeff Majeau ~ Bass; Neil Taylor ~ Bass; Steve Wolpe ~ Drums; Pete Premo ~ Drums; Sally Marshall ~ Backup Vocals; Britt Sawdon ~ Vocals
Bring It On Home	James Montgomery Blues Band	2001 July 31 Audio CD	Conqueroot Records	1. Sweet Sixteen; 2. The Sleeper; 3. Dimples; 4. Back on My Knees Again; 5. Lovin' Cup; 6. Bring It On Home; 7. Mona; 8. Ramblin' Man; 9. Junior's Jump; 10. Wedding Ring; 11. Sinkin' Blues	James Montgomery ~ Lead Vocals, Harmonica; James Cotton ~ Harmonica; Marc Copely ~ Guitar; Tom West ~ Keyboards; Marty Richards ~ Drums, Percussion
Live at the Capitol Theater	James Montgomery and Bruce Marshall Duo	2000 Audio CD ~ Opening for BB King	ATM Records		James Montgomery ~ Lead Vocals, Harmonica; Bruce Marshall ~ Lead Vocals, Electric, Acoustic and Dubro Guitars
Double Wide	Uncle Kracker	2000 June 13 Audio CD	Lava Records	2. Better Days	Uncle Kracker's 1st CD, earned a Gold Record, went Platinum (August 2001) and later Double-Platinum.: Uncle Kracker ~ Rap Vocals; Kid Rock ~ Guitar, Programming, Turntables, Background Vocals; James Montgomery ~ Harmonica; Kenny Olson ~ Guitar; Jason Krause ~ Guitar; Lynn Owsely ~ Pedal Steel Guitar; Jimmie Bones ~ Keyboards, Background Vocals; Michael Bradford ~ Bass, Programming, Background Vocals; Stefanie Eulinberg ~ Drums
The Oven Is On	James Montgomery Band	1991 Audio CD	Tone-Cool Records, Newton, MA – CD 1145	1. Back From The Dead; 2. The Oven Is On; 3. Mystery; 4. Little Black Dress; 5. Danger Zone; 6. Nobody Could Love You; 7. Down in Florida; 8. Rock & Roll VJ; 9. Miss You; 10. Yonders Wall; 11. Dance; 12. Smokey's Barbecue	James Montgomery ~ Vocals, Harmonica; Steve Barbuto ~ Drums, Background Vocals; Lenny Bradford ~ Bass, Background Vocals; Paul Murphy ~ Guitars; Special guests: Crispin Cloe ~ Sax (7,8); Ron Levy ~ Pinao, organ (1,3,4,5,6,7,11); Sherryl Marshall ~ Background Vocals (3,6,7,12); Buck Taylor ~ Background Vocals (3,6,7,12); Bird Taylor ~ Background Vocals (3,6,7,12); Heavy metal horns: Garret Savluk ~ Trumpet (1,4,7,9,11); John Ferry ~ Trombone (1,4,7,9,11); John Vanderpool ~ Tenor Sax (1,4,7,9,11); Henley Douglas, JR. ~ Baritone Sax (1,4,7,9,11); Credits: Produced by Ron Levy for Levtron Productions; Executive Producer / Engineer Richard Rosenblatt; Art Direction: Boo Topeka; Digitally Mastered by Dr. Toby Mountain; Northeastern Digital Recording, Southborough, MA
Live Trax	James Montgomery	1983 Vinyl LP	MSI Records (Canadian)	Side 1: Schoolin' The Dice; Tuff; Urban Cats; Pain; New England Sunshine; Side 2: (I'M Counting on The) Rock & Roll; Marlelous Marvin; You Got to Love Me; Train	
Duck Fever	James Montgomery	1978 Vinyl LP (US Release)	Waterhouse Records	Side 1: 1. Working on a Love Affair; 2. Who'll Be The Next in Line?; 3. For Your Love; 4. Crazy About My Baby; Side 2: 1. Heaven Help Me; 2. New England Sunshine; 3. Not Your Clown; 4. Fire on the Bayou; 5. Living for the Weekend	James Montgomery with members of the David Letterman Band: James Montgomery ~ Lead Vocals, Harmonica, Backing Vocals; Hugh McCracken – Jeff Mironou – John Cavari – Richie Zito – Steve Satter ~ Guitar; Jeff Levine – Paul Griffen ~ Keyboards; Bill Lee ~ Bob Babbit – Francisco Centino ~ Bass; Chris Parker – Luther Rix – Rich Dishman – Richard Crooks ~ Drums; Rubens Bassini ~ Percussion; Barbara Holliday – Diva Gray – Gordon Grody – Josh Shaw – Rudy Gray – Tony Rodriguez ~ Backing Vocals; Don Oriolo ~ Producer, Guitar, Backing Vocals; Ed Stasium ~ Engineer, Backing Vocals; Milt Levy ~ Executive Producer; Jeff Levine (Track A4), Paul Griffin (A1, A2, A3, B1 to B5) ~ Arrangements; John McIntosh ~ Artwork Cover Illustrations; Becca Martinson ~ Cover Layout Design; Jeff Albertson ~ Photography
Fire on the Bayou	James Montgomery	1978 Vinyl 45 rpm Record	Waterhouse Records (15001)	Side A ~ Fire on the Bayou; Side B ~ New England Sunshine	
James Montgomery Band	James Montgomery Band	1976 Vinyl LP	Island Records	Side A: 1. City Music; 2. Foot Floppin'; 3. Don't You Just Know It; 4. Hotcha Mama; Side B: 1. Stoop Down; 2. Steppin' (Out in Style); 3. Hang on To Love; 4. Teasin' You	James Montgomery ~ Harmonica, Vocals; Billy Mather ~ Bass; Chuck Purro ~ Drums, Percussion, Vocals; Peter Bell ~ Guitar; David Woodford ~ Saxophone; David Case ~ Keyboards; Paul Lenart ~ Lead Guitar; Allen Toussaint, Marshall Sehorn ~ Producer
The Gooba Gooba Song	James Montgomery Band	1976 Original 12" Mix	Island Records (IS1003)	Side A ~ The Gooba Gooba Song; Side B ~ Foot Floppin	Producer: Allen Toussaint
I Can't Stop (No, No, No)	James Montgomery Band	1976 Vinyl 45 rpm Record	Capricorn Records (CPS 0217)	I Can't Stop (No, No, No); Schoolin' Them Dice	
Baby I Love You	Barbara Holliday with James Montgomery & Radio King and His Court of Rhythm	1975 Vinyl 45 rpm Record	Jelly Records (JR 002)	Side A ~ Baby I Love You; Side B ~ Ain't Nobody's Business If I Do (with James Montgomery)	
Brickyard Blues & As love Is The Thing	James Montgomery Band	1974 Vinyl 45 RPM Record	Capricorn Records (CPS 0204)	Side A ~ Brickyard Blues; Side B ~ As 'love Is The Thing'	
Brickyard Blues	The James Montgomery Band	1974 Vinyl 45 RPM Promo Record	Capricorn Records, Inc. Manufactured by Warner Bros. Records, Inc. (MONO CPS 0204) (SNY0931)	Side A ~ Brickyard Blues (Mono); Side B ~ Brickyard Blues (Stereo)	James Montgomery ~ Lead Vocals, Harmonica; Allen Toussaint ~ Composer; Tom Dowd ~ Producer for Capricorn Records Inc. by special arrangement with Phil Walden & Assoc., Inc.; NOTE: There is a misspelling of artist's last name on both of the record's labels. ("Montomery" instead of the correct "Montgomery").
High Roller	James Montgomery Band	1974 Vinyl LP	Capricorn Records, Manufactured By Warner Bros. Records Inc.	Side 1: 1. Shot Down Love; 2. Hobo; 3. Love Is A Thing; 4. Schoolin' Them Dice; 5. I Can't Stop (No, No, No); Side 2: 1. Any Number Can Play; 2. Try It; 3. Brickyard Blues; 4. Sing You A Love Song; 5. Ten Page Letter	James Montgomery ~ Harmonica, Vocals; Peter Bell ~ Guitar, Vocals; David Case ~ Piano, Clavinet, Organ, Vocals; Peter Malick ~ Lead Guitar, Steel Guitar, Vocals; Billy Mather ~ Bass, Vocals; Chuck Purro ~ Drums, Percussion, Vocals; Albhy Galuten, Tom Dowd ~ Producer
First Time Out	James Montgomery Band	1973 Vinyl LP & 1998 October 20 Digitally Remastered Audio CD	Capricorn Records	CD TRACKS: 1. Don't Do That; 2. I'm Funky But I'm Clean; 3. Ready Teddy; 4. If You Want Me; 5. Drive Myself Crazy; 6. Going Down; 7. Son of Jump; 8. Everybody Knows the Answer; 9. Train	James Montgomery ~ Lead Vocals, Harmonica; Peter Malick ~ Electric & Steel Guitars, Vocals; Peter Bell ~ Guitar, Vocals; David Case ~ Piano, Clavinet, Organ, Keyboards, Vocals; Billy Mather ~ Bass, Vocals; Chuck Purro ~ Drums, Percussion, Vocals; Larry Washington ~ Congas, Bongos; Carl Paruolo, Jay Mark, Dirk Devlin, Don Murray ~ Engineers; Bruce Steinberg ~ Photographer; Recorded at Sigma Sound Studios A & B, Philadelphia, Pennsylvania from July–August 1973.; Digitally Remastered by Suha Gur (PolyGram Studios).
