= WKFD =

Radio station in Wickford, Rhode Island (1961–1998)

Wickford, Rhode Island; United States
- Broadcast area: Providence-Warwick market
- Frequency: 1370 kHz
- Branding: Bay Radio

Programming
- Language: English

Ownership
- Owner: Jerome Frederick Gaudet

History
- First air date: 1961
- Last air date: July 29, 1998
- Former call signs: WKFD (1961–1979); WMYD (1979–1985); WKFD (1985–2001)
- Call sign meaning: Wickford

Technical information
- Facility ID: 2847
- Class: III-D, later D
- Power: 250 watts day; 130 watts night
- Transmitter coordinates: 41°35′52.4″N 71°25′42.2″W

WKFD (1370 AM) was a radio station which existed from 1961 until 2001 when its license was deleted after being silent for three years (the station last broadcast on July 29, 1998). WKFD was licensed to the village of Wickford, Rhode Island. The station operated on 1370 kHz with a transmitter power of 250 watts daytime, 130 watts nighttime. Its transmitter was located at 19 Updike Avenue.

Beginning in 1969, the station was co-owned for several years by retired newscaster Lou Adler, who had previously broadcast on WCBS in New York City. At the time, WKFD promoted itself as "the radio lighthouse", serving both sides of Narragansett Bay.

During the late 1980s, the station was owned by Paul Pabis and his wife Holly (better known as WJAR anchor Patrice Wood). The station's tower collapsed in August 1990; it was unable to secure approval to build a replacement tower after legal objections by area residents. The WKFD studio building was converted into a private residence in the early 1990s.

After the WKFD license was deleted, another attempt was made to build 1370 kHz in Rhode Island, this time from Charlestown. Astro Tele-Communications Corp., owners of WADK and WJZS, was awarded a construction permit for the frequency in 2006 and chose the WKFD callsign. The new facility would have utilized 2,500 watts during the day and 5,000 at night—considerably higher than the original WKFD. This construction permit never made it on to the air and was deleted in November 2009.
