= WKKB =

- Middletown, Rhode Island; United States
- Broadcast area: Newport–Providence, Rhode Island; New Bedford–Fall River, Massachusetts
- Frequency: 100.3 MHz
- Branding: Latina 100.3

Programming
- Language: Spanish
- Format: Latin pop; reggaeton; tropical music

Ownership
- Owner: John Fuller; (Red Wolf Broadcasting Corporation)

History
- First air date: October 6, 1978
- Former call signs: WOTB (1972–1978); WOTB-FM (1978–1980); WOTB (1980–1996); WDGF (1996–1997); WHKK (1997–2000); WZRI (2000–2002)
- Former frequencies: 107.1 MHz (1978–1988)

Technical information
- Licensing authority: FCC
- Facility ID: 52318
- Class: A
- ERP: 1,550 watts
- HAAT: 200 meters (660 ft)
- Transmitter coordinates: 41°35′48.4″N 71°11′22.2″W

Links
- Public license information: Public file; LMS
- Webcast: Listen live
- Website: www.latina1003fm.com

WKKB (100.3 FM, "Latina 100.3") is a radio station in Middletown, Rhode Island, United States. The station airs a tropical music format, which consists of such musical styles as Latin pop, merengue and salsa music and some reggaeton. Its transmitter is located in Middletown. Its offices and studios are located in 75 Oxford Street in Providence, while its transmitter is located in Tiverton. Prior to its switch to tropical, the station was a rock station.

== History ==
WKKB started out as WOTB on October 6, 1978, on 107.1 MHz. WOTB was a smooth jazz station with the moniker "Cool FM", co-owned with WKFD in Wickford, and later with WADK in Newport. WOTB switched frequencies to 100.3 MHz and boosted its effective radiated power to 6 kW.

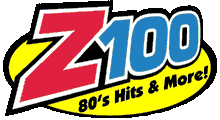
Former logo under the "Z100" branding

The smooth jazz format ended on June 14, 1996, when it was sold to Urso Broadcasting. WOTB then changed to WDGF and began simulcasting WDGE for a brief time. In February 1997, WDGF became a 1970s oldies and disco station as "100.3 The Beat". After stunting with a three-day electronic countdown, WDGF then became classic hits as WHKK "100FM The Hawk" on October 10, 1997. During this time, 99.7 entered into simulcasting WHKK. Both stations then became all-1980s hits as "Z100" with the 100.3 frequency adopting the WZRI callsign.

In October 2002, WHKK's studios were moved to Fairhaven, Massachusetts, with Citadel Broadcasting sister stations WBSM and WFHN. On October 31, the calls were changed to the current WKKB, and the station began targeting the South Coast region of Massachusetts by flipping to a rock format as "100.3 KKB"; the first song on KKB was "You Shook Me All Night Long" by AC/DC. During its run as a rock station, WKKB served as the Providence and South Coast affiliate of the Patriots Rock Radio Network.

In January 2005, Citadel sold WKKB and WAKX to Davidson Media Group; WKKB changed to tropical music as "Latina 100.3" on February 1 of that year. WKKB was one of four stations sold to Red Wolf Broadcasting in 2015.
