= 2004 Michigan Proposal 04-2 =

Referendum banning same-sex marriage

Proposal 2
- Michigan Marriage Amendment

Results
Choice	Votes	%
Yes	2,698,077	58.62%
No	1,904,319	41.38%
Total votes	4,875,692	100.00%
Registered voters/turnout	7,164,047	64.24%
County results
Yes
70–80%
60–70%
50–60%
No
50–60%

Michigan Proposal 04-2 of 2004, is an amendment to the Michigan Constitution that made it unconstitutional for the state to recognize or perform same-sex marriages or civil unions. The referendum was approved by 59% of the voters. The amendment faced multiple legal challenges and was finally overturned in Obergefell v. Hodges by the U.S. Supreme Court.

== Contents ==
The text of the amendment states:

To secure and preserve the benefits of marriage for our society and for future generations of children, the union of one man and one woman in marriage shall be the only agreement recognized as a marriage or similar union for any purpose.

== Results ==
Proposal 04-2
Choice	Votes	%
For	2,698,077	58.62
Against	1,904,319	41.38
Total	4,602,396	100.00
Registered voters/turnout	7,263,024	63.36

== Effects ==
The amendment, which took effect on December 18, 2004, constitutionally banned same-sex marriages, which were never recognized by the state and was statutorily banned since 1996, and civil unions or civil union equivalents, which were never recognized by the state. Michigan became the 13th US state to ban same-sex marriage in its constitution and 8th US state to ban civil unions or civil union equivalents in its constitution. This preempted the state judiciary from requiring the state to legally recognize same-sex marriages or civil unions or civil union equivalents and preempted the Michigan Legislature from enacting a statute legalizing same-sex marriages or civil unions or civil union equivalents. Domestic partnerships in Michigan were legal in 3 counties and 4 municipalities when the amendment took effect on December 18, 2004.

On March 16, 2005, Attorney General Mike Cox issued a formal opinion stating that the City of Kalamazoo's policy of providing same-sex domestic partner health insurance benefits to public employees for contracts did violate the amendment. In January 2006, the City of Kalamazoo responded to this opinion by ceasing to providing same-sex domestic partner health insurance benefits to public employees for contracts absent a court ruling that such benefits do not violate the marriage amendment. In May 2008, the Michigan Supreme Court held that the amendment bans not only same-sex marriage and civil unions, but also public employee domestic partnership benefits such as health insurance. However, the ruling had little effect since most public employers relaxed their eligibility criteria to not run afoul of the amendment.

On June 28, 2013, U.S. District Judge David M. Lawson issued a preliminary injunction blocking the state from enforcing its law banning local governments and school districts from offering health benefits to their employees' domestic partners. He wrote: "It is hard to argue with a straight face that the primary purpose—indeed, perhaps the sole purpose—of the statute is other than to deny health benefits to the same-sex partners of public employees. But that can never be a legitimate governmental purpose". He rejected the state's arguments that "fiscal responsibility" was the law's rationale.

On March 21, 2014, a federal judge ruled that Michigan's ban on same-sex marriage is unconstitutional and did not stay the ruling, although the ruling was later suspended.

On November 6, 2014, the United States Court of Appeals for the Sixth Circuit overturned the lower court in DeBoer v. Snyder declaring that:

When the courts do not let the people resolve new social issues like this one, they perpetuate the idea that the heroes in these change events are judges and lawyers. Better in this instance, we think, to allow change through the customary political processes, in which the people, gay and straight alike, become the heroes of their own stories by meeting each other not as adversaries in a court system but as fellow citizens seeking to resolve a new social issue in a fair-minded way. For these reasons, we reverse.

On January 16, 2015, the U.S. Supreme Court granted certiorari to the same-sex marriage cases arising out of the United States Court of Appeals for the Sixth Circuit. Oral arguments were held on April 28, 2015, and a ruling was made on June 26, 2015, allowing same-sex marriage in every state.

== Pre-decision opinion polls ==
Date of opinion poll	Conducted by	Sample size	In favor	Against	Undecided	Margin	Margin of Error	Source
August 2004	?	705 likely voters	50%	41%	?	9% pro	?	

== See also ==
- Civil union in the United States
- Domestic partnership in the United States
- LGBT rights in Michigan
- Same-sex marriage in Michigan
- Same-sex marriage in the United States
