= Henry D. Messer =

American activist and neurosurgeon

Henry Davis Messer MD
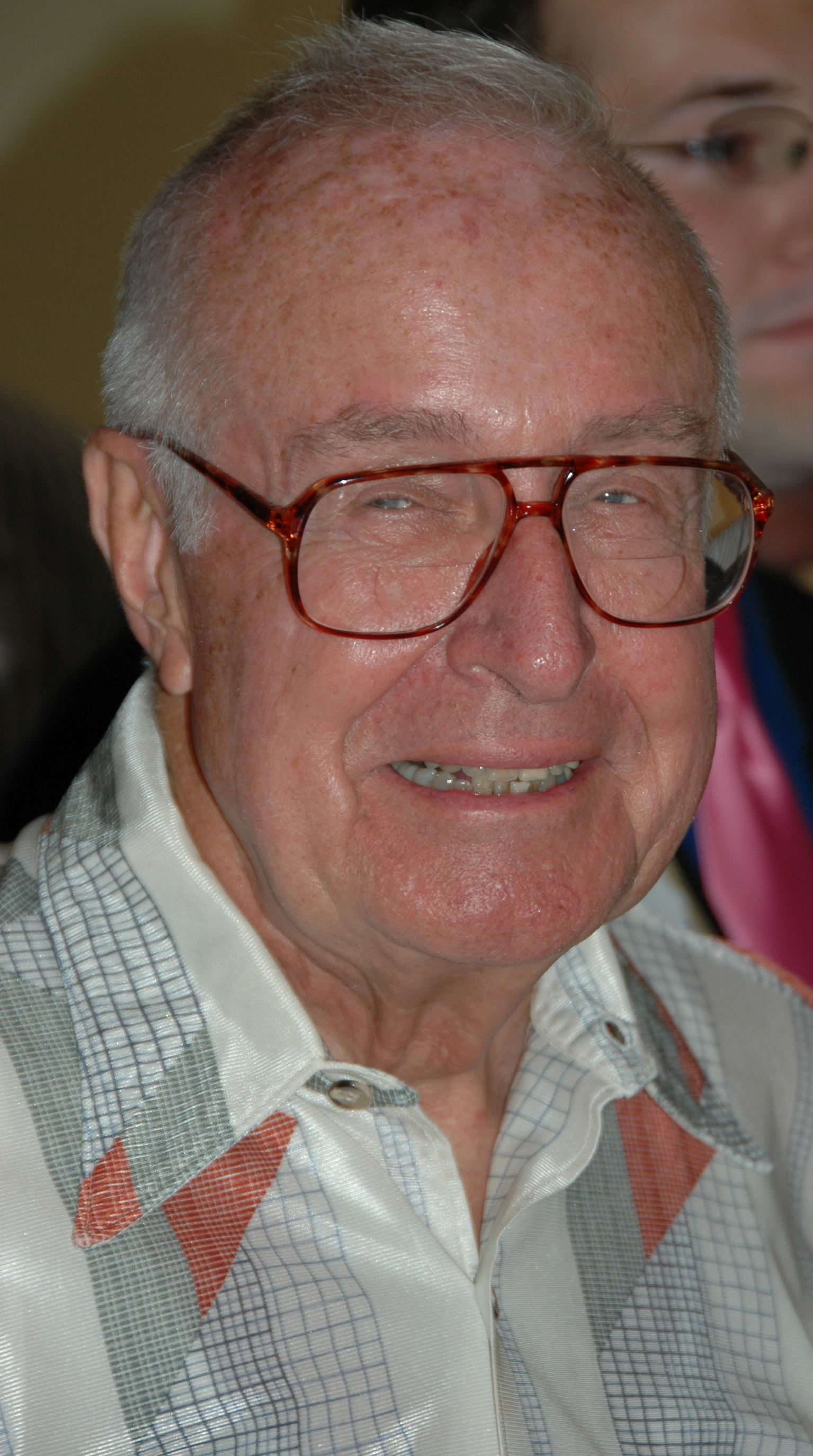
- Messer at Triangle Foundation event in June 2006
- Born: September 22, 1927; Madison, Florida, US
- Died: February 18, 2014 (aged 86); Dearborn Heights, Michigan, US
- Education: Duke University
- Occupations: LGBT rights activist, neurosurgeon
- Years active: 1953–2013
- Organization: Equality Michigan
- Movement: LGBT rights, human rights
- Partner: Carl House
- Military career
- Allegiance: United States of America
- Branch: United States Army Air Forces
- Service years: c.1950-1953
- Rank: Captain
- Wars: Korean War

Henry Davis Messer (September 22, 1927 – February 18, 2014) was an American LGBT rights activist and neurosurgeon. He was an early member of the Mattachine Society, involved with the first attempt to pass a human rights ordinance inclusive of sexual orientation in New York City, and co-founder of Triangle Foundation (today known as Equality Michigan).

== Personal life ==
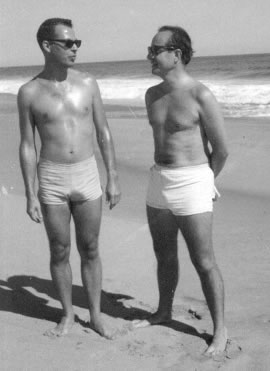
Messer (right) with his partner of 63 years (at the time of his death), Carl House (left)

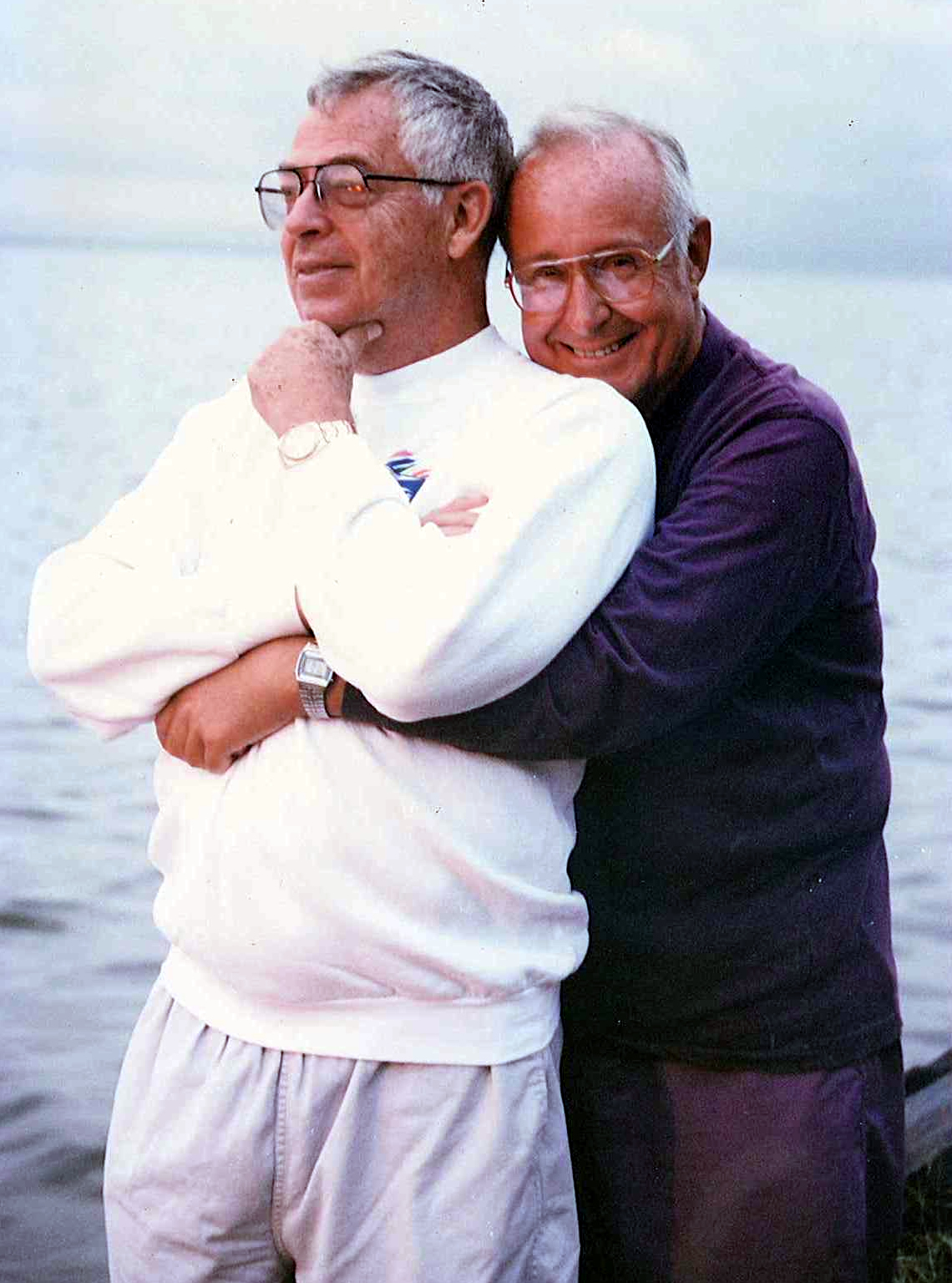
Messer (right) with his partner, Carl House (left)

Messer was born in Madison, Florida on September 22, 1927, to Henry Messer, owner of a Chevrolet dealership, and Sarah Messer, a housewife. He moved to Durham, North Carolina to study premedicine at Duke University and went to Duke University School of Medicine.

Messer met his life partner, Carl House, while serving as a captain in the United States Army Air Forces. House was a corporal in the United States Army when they met in 1951 after a night out with a group of gay servicemen. In 1953, after resigning from the Army Air Force, Messer and House moved to New York City's Greenwich Village. They moved to Dearborn Heights, Michigan in 1976.

He was shot while volunteering at the Triangle Foundation's office in Detroit on June 28, 1995. The incident received national attention as a possible anti-gay hate crime.

Messer died at approximately 5:00am on February 18, 2014, at his home in Dearborn Heights after a struggle with cancer.

== Professional work ==
During the Korean War, he entered the United States Air Force as a first lieutenant. During the war, he was stationed at Maxwell Air Force Base in Montgomery, Alabama, and began his specialization in neurosurgery under orders from his commanding officer.

Messer was forced to resign his commission as a captain in 1953 after an officer with whom Messer had been involved turned him in for being a gay man. Air Force investigators went through his phone book and the film on his camera while searching for evidence. The investigation lasted three months and included the investigators traveling to his hometown and asked acquaintances whether he had shown signs of being gay while he was growing up.

After resigning from the Air Force, Messer completed his residency and then practiced neurosurgery at Saint Vincent's Catholic Medical Center in Greenwich Village. In the late 1960s, he took a position at Harlem Hospital Center, where he became chief of neurosurgery in 1972. He left in 1976 to become chief of neurosurgery at Wayne County General Hospital, at that time a teaching unit of the University of Michigan. When Messer applied for the position, he listed a 1974 article that essentially identified him as an openly gay man. At the time, it was unusual for physicians to be open about their sexuality. He retired from Wayne County General Hospital at age 60.

== LGBT rights activism ==
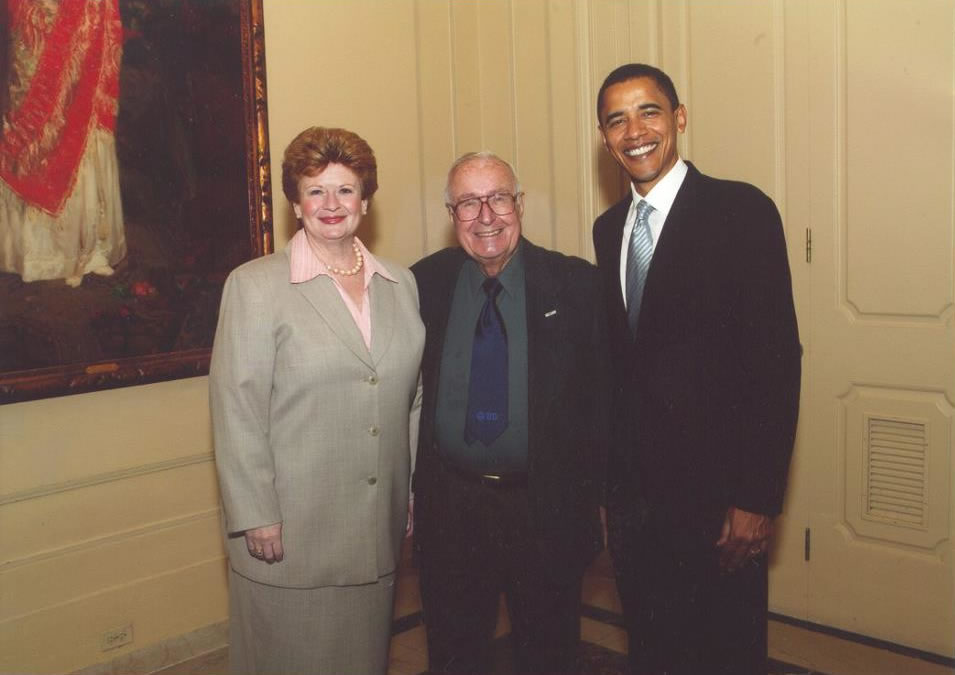
Messer posing with Senator Debbie Stabenow and President Barack Obama.

Messer's LGBT political advocacy focused on police entrapment and improving the climate for LGBT youth, especially young people in the medical field.

Shortly after moving to New York City in the early 1950s, Messer joined the Mattachine Society. His participation as a neurosurgeon was especially notable as he did not participate in the group under a pseudonym, which was the most common practice for members of the organization at that time. Messer also participated in the Stonewall riots of 1969.

Around 1970, Messer and House hosted a meeting with Mattachine members and New York City Councilman Eldon R. Clingan, where the members of the organization shared their firsthand accounts of discrimination with the city leader. Clingan and Councilman Carter Burden introduced a bill in 1971, which Messer helped author, that would have prohibited discrimination in employment and housing on the basis of sexual orientation in New York City. The bill was unsuccessful and such a bill would not pass in New York City until 1986.

In 1974, he wrote a chapter entitled "The Homosexual as Physician" for Human Sexuality: A Health Practitioner's Text by Richard Green. It was the first account of gay doctors to be included in a medical textbook.

After moving to Michigan in 1976, he became involved with the Association of Suburban People (ASP) as a board member and public face of the organization. In 1977, he appeared with Wes Rogalski, president of ASP, on "Gayly Speaking", a WDET-FM program. He also helped organize the first "Developing a Positive Gay-Lesbian Identity" conference in 1980, and was profiled in Metra magazine in 1982. Messer later became involved with the Michigan Organization for Human Rights (MOHR) as a board member and proponent of lobbying elected officials and holding them accountable to their LGBT constituents.

Messer was arrested in January 1985 by an undercover police officer at the Irving Art Theater for alleged indecent behavior. He was convicted of the crime, fined, and placed on one year's probation. New York State rescinded his medical license because of his conviction. While his Michigan license was not in danger of being rescinded, he decided to retire at age 60. Messer recounted his experiences in MOHR's newsletter.

He co-founded Triangle Foundation in 1991, at age 63. The organization merged with Michigan Equality in 2010 to form Equality Michigan. Following his death in 2014, Messer's estate donated approximately US$2,000,000 to the organization's endowment and approximately US$1,000,000, spread over four years, to support the organization's work.

== Acknowledgements ==
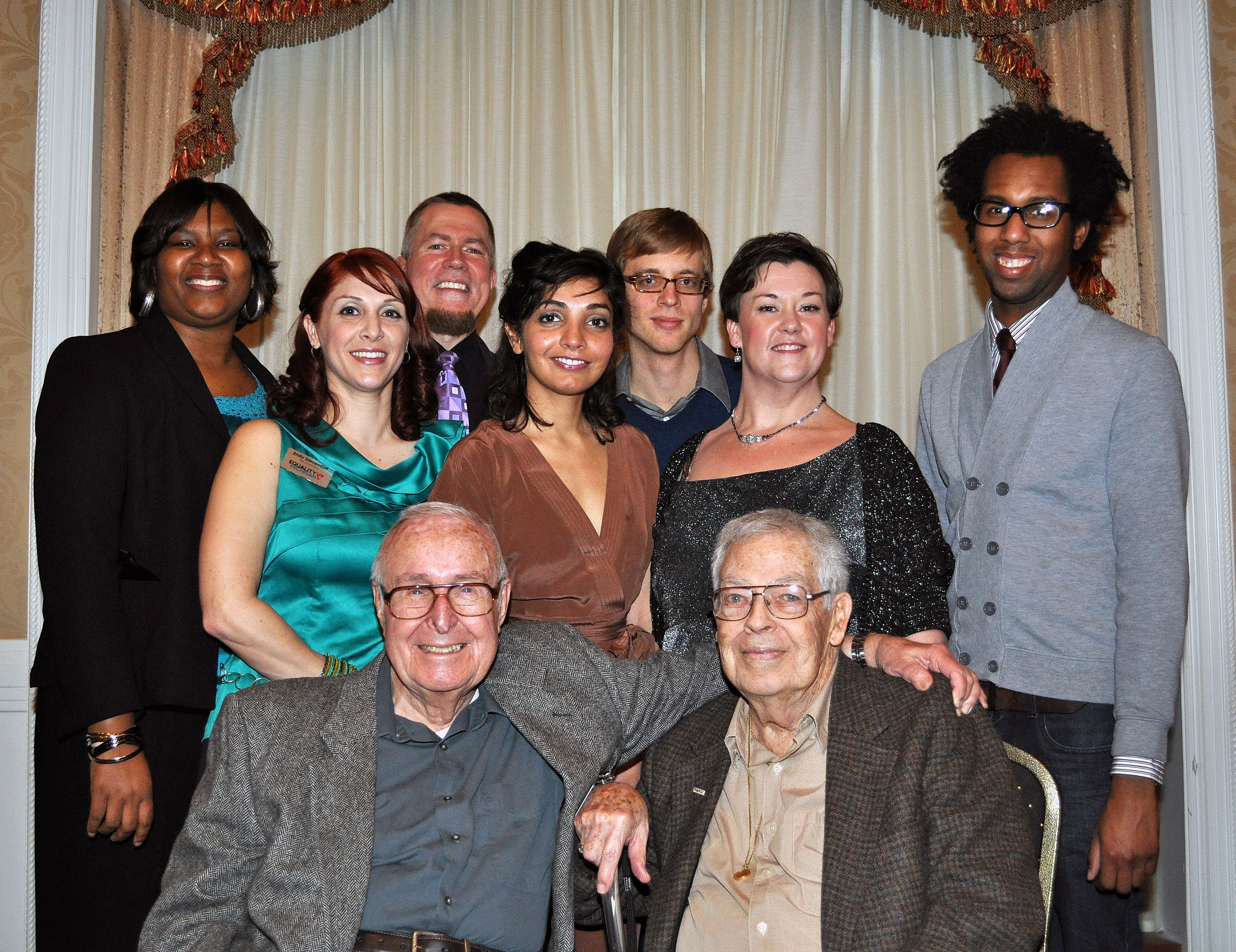
Messer (bottom left) and partner Carl House (bottom right) with Equality Michigan's staff at 60th Anniversary event in February 2012.

Tribute by Senator Debbie Stabenow to Messer, recorded for his April 2014 memorial service.

Equality Michigan has annually awarded a Henry D. Messer Youth Activist Award since 2000 to recipients such as State Representative Jon Hoadley.

Messer received the Lifetime Achievement Award at the annual Southeast Michigan LGBT Pride Banquet on June 15, 1995.

Representative David E. Bonior stood on the floor of the United States House of Representatives and acknowledged Messer and House's 50th anniversary in 2002, also noting their many years of activism. State Representative Patricia Godchaux requested, and received, a tribute to the couple on their 50th anniversary from Michigan Governor John Engler. The Governor's office later stated that the tribute was signed by a machine, and that the Governor wouldn't have signed the tribute if he had known what it was for.

Representative Hansen Clarke made remarks commemorating the couple's 60th anniversary at an anniversary party and benefit for Equality Michigan in 2012.

The National LGBTQ Task Force dedicated its 2015 National Conference on LGBT Equality: Creating Change to Messer.

== See also ==
- Equality Michigan
- Michigan Organization for Human Rights
- LGBT rights in Michigan
- LGBT rights in New York
