= Doe v. University of Michigan =

Court case

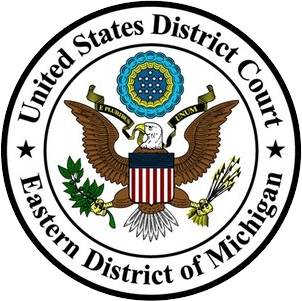
- Court: United States District Court for the Eastern District of Michigan Southern Division
- Full case name: John Doe v. University of Michigan
- Decided: September 22, 1989
- Docket nos.: 89-cv-71683
- Defendant: University of Michigan
- Counsel for plaintiff: Robert A. Sedler, Paul J. Denenfeld
- Plaintiff: John Doe
- Citation: 721 F. Supp. 852

Case history
- Subsequent action: Injunction against the university's speech code prohibiting hate speech.

Holding
- The university's policy prohibiting hate speech was overly broad and too vague to be implemented in a way that did not risk infringing on the First Amendment rights of the plaintiff and outweighed the campus administration's duty to regulate the campus environment.

Court membership
- Judge sitting: Avern Cohn

Doe v. University of Michigan, 721 F. Supp. 852 (E.D. Mich. 1989), was a case in which the 1988 anti-hate speech policy of the University of Michigan was ruled unconstitutional and violated First Amendment rights.

== Background ==
In response to a rise in incidents of racial and discriminatory harassment on campus, the University of Michigan implemented a “Policy on Discrimination and Discriminatory Harassment” in 1988. This policy prohibited behavior, including speech, that “stigmatized or victimized” individuals based on characteristics such as race, ethnicity, religion, sex, sexual orientation, and other protected classes. The policy was particularly stringent in educational settings like classrooms and libraries, where it aimed to prevent the creation of an “intimidating, hostile, or demeaning environment.”

John Doe, a graduate student in psychology, challenged the policy, expressing concern that discussing controversial theories related to biological differences among sexes and races could be perceived as harassment under the policy. He argued that the policy was overly broad and vague, potentially infringing upon his First Amendment rights and chilling academic freedom.

=== Legal issue ===
The central question was whether the University’s policy violated the First Amendment by restricting speech that is constitutionally protected.

== Outcome ==
The U.S. District Court for the Eastern District of Michigan ruled in favor of John Doe, declaring the university’s policy unconstitutional. The court found that the policy was both overbroad and vague.

- Overly broad: The policy encompassed a substantial amount of protected speech, thereby deterring individuals from engaging in lawful expression due to fear of sanctions.
- Vague: Terms like “stigmatize” and “victimize” were not clearly defined, leading to arbitrary enforcement and uncertainty about what constituted a violation.

The court emphasized that while the University has a legitimate interest in preventing discrimination and harassment, it must do so without infringing upon free speech rights. Consequently, the court issued a permanent injunction against the enforcement of the policy’s speech-related provisions but allowed the University to regulate physical conduct.

== Impact ==
This case set a precedent in the ongoing debate over campus speech codes and the extent to which educational institutions can regulate speech without violating constitutional rights. It underscored the importance of drafting policies that are narrowly tailored and clearly defined to avoid infringing upon free expression, especially in academic settings where the exchange of ideas is fundamental.

Carol W. Napier wrote in a 1991 law review article that the case left universities effectively unable to control speech on campus whatsoever. However, since universities are also equally bound to maintain an appropriate educational environment for everyone, the only choice school administrators had left is to try to remove bias and discrimination from the behavior of those on campus.

Napier wrote, "The Doe decision and other court challenges may force university officials to devise and implement other means to curb ethnic, racial, sexual, and homosexual harassment. Stripped of the power to regulate hate speech in any meaningful way, universities must focus on eliminating the root causes of discrimination."
