= Lou Adler (journalist) =

American radio journalist

Louis Charles Adler (April 18, 1929 – December 22, 2017) was an American radio journalist, director of Quinnipiac University's Ed McMahon Mass Communication Center, and also was Quinnipiac's Fred Friendly-endowed Professor of Broadcast Journalism.

== Biography ==
Adler was born in Jamestown, New York, the son of Sylvan David Adler, a salesman, and Myrtie Marguerite Peterson. A longtime morning news anchor on WCBS in New York, Adler was credited with popularizing the "talk news radio" format on WCBS during the late 1960s. From 1969 to 1980, Adler also served as WCBS' general manager and/or news director, but was replaced by Robert Vaughn in 1981. After his retirement, he became owner of WKFD, an AM radio station in Wickford, Rhode Island.

== Death ==
He died on December 22, 2017 in Meriden, Connecticut at the age of 88 from Alzheimer's disease.

== Sources ==
- Archived profile
