= Avern Cohn =

American judge (1924–2022)

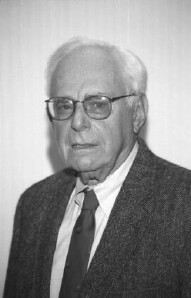

Senior Judge of the United States District Court for the Eastern District of Michigan
- In office October 9, 1999 – February 4, 2022

Judge of the United States District Court for the Eastern District of Michigan
- In office September 26, 1979 – October 9, 1999
- Appointed by: Jimmy Carter
- Preceded by: Seat established by 92 Stat. 1629
- Succeeded by: David M. Lawson

Personal details
- Born: Avern Levin Cohn; July 23, 1924 Detroit, Michigan, U.S.
- Died: February 4, 2022 (aged 97) Royal Oak, Michigan, U.S.
- Education: University of Michigan; University of Michigan Law School (JD)

Avern Levin Cohn (July 23, 1924 – February 4, 2022) was a United States district judge of the United States District Court for the Eastern District of Michigan.

== Personal life ==
Cohn was born in Detroit, Michigan, to Irwin I. and Sadie Levin Cohn. He attended the University of Michigan, John Tarleton Agricultural College, Stanford University and Loyola School of Medicine. He served in the United States Army from 1943 to 1946. He received his Juris Doctor from the University of Michigan Law School in 1949 and was admitted to the Michigan State Bar in December 1949. Cohn died after a brief illness in Royal Oak, Michigan, on February 4, 2022, at the age of 97.

== Career ==
Cohn engaged in private practice in the Law Office of Irwin I. Cohn from 1949 to 1961, and at Honigman Miller Schwartz and Cohn from 1961 to 1979. Cohn served on the Michigan Social Welfare Commission in 1963, the Michigan Civil Rights Commission from 1972 to 1975 (as Chair from 1974 to 1975), and the Detroit Board of Police Commissioners from 1975 to 1979 (as Chair in 1979). Cohn is a member of several bar associations including the Detroit Bar Association, the State Bar of Michigan, the Federal Circuit Bar Association, the Federal Bar Association, and the American Bar Association. He served as the Chairperson of the Special Committee on Court Congestion, of the State Bar of Michigan from 1977 to 1978, on the Representative Assembly of the State Bar of Michigan from 1973 to 1979, as Past Trustee of the Detroit Bar Association Foundation, as Past Director of Detroit Bar Association, as a member of the American Law Institute, and as Director of the American Judicature Society.

== Federal judicial service ==
Cohn was nominated by President Jimmy Carter on May 17, 1979, to the United States District Court for the Eastern District of Michigan, to a new seat created by 92 Stat. 1629 and was confirmed by the United States Senate on September 25, 1979, receiving his commission on September 26, 1979. Cohn assumed senior status on October 9, 1999. Cohn maintained a full caseload until December 2019, when he announced he was scaling back his caseload and dropping all criminal cases from his docket in favor of civil cases only.

== Notable cases ==
Cohn ruled in Odgers v. Ortho Pharmaceutical Corp. that a manufacturer of oral contraceptives has a duty to warn users of known side effects.

Cohn decided in Doe v. University of Michigan that the University of Michigan's Policy on Discrimination and Discriminatory Harassment of Students in the University Environment was unconstitutionally vague and overbroad in violation of the First Amendment.

Sitting by designation, in his concurrence in Kruse v. City of Cincinnati, Cohn wrote: "The Supreme Court's decision in Buckley, however, is not a broad pronouncement declaring all campaign expenditure limits unconstitutional. It may be possible to develop a factual record to establish that the interest in freeing officeholders from the pressures of fundraising so they can perform their duties, or the interest in preserving faith in our democracy, is compelling, and that campaign expenditure limits are a narrowly tailored means of serving such an interest."

Cohn issued an injunction in PAACAR v. TeleScan Techs. to prevent the defendant from using the plaintiff's Peterbilt and Kenworth trademarks in any of the defendant's domain names, web pages, or web sites.

While serving on the bench, Cohn also published scholarship and commentary:

- A Judge's View of Congressional Action Affecting the Courts (criticizing the political influences upon and empirical basis for the Civil Justice Reform Act)
- The Unfairness of 'Substantial Assistance' (questioning the disadvantaged position of defendants who decline to assist prosecutors while maintaining their innocence)
- Advice to the Commission – A Sentencer's View (arguing for increased availability of sentencing data to assess judicial efficiency and alleged disparities under Sentencing Guidelines)
- The Rise and Fall of Affirmative Action in Jury Selection (with David Sherwood) (examining the efforts of the U.S. District Court for the Eastern District of Michigan to achieve better racial balancing in jury selection and the cessation of this effort due to the Sixth Circuit decision in United States v. Ovalle)
- The Federal Judiciary and the ABA Model Code: The Parting of Ways (with Andrew Lievense) (discussing judicial recusal and sanctions for misconduct)

== See also ==
- List of Jewish American jurists

== Sources ==
- Biography at the United States District Court for the Eastern District of Michigan

Legal offices
Preceded by Seat established by 92 Stat. 1629	Judge of the United States District Court for the Eastern District of Michigan; 1979–1999	Succeeded by David M. Lawson
