= F. Kay Behm =

American judge (born 1969)

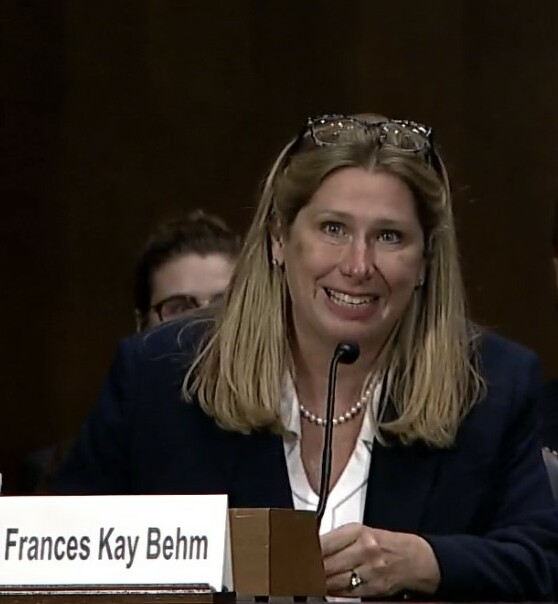

Judge of the United States District Court for the Eastern District of Michigan
- Incumbent
- Assumed office December 15, 2022
- Appointed by: Joe Biden
- Preceded by: David M. Lawson

Judge of the Genesee County Circuit and Probate Courts
- In office April 10, 2009 – December 15, 2022
- Appointed by: Jennifer Granholm
- Preceded by: Robert E. Weiss
- Succeeded by: Ariana E. Heath

Personal details
- Born: Frances Kay Courter; 1969 (age 56–57) Alma, Michigan, U.S.
- Education: Albion College (BA); University of Michigan (JD)

Frances Kay Behm (born 1969) is a United States district judge of the United States District Court for the Eastern District of Michigan.

== Education ==
Behm received a Bachelor of Arts summa cum laude from Albion College in 1991 and a Juris Doctor from the University of Michigan Law School in 1994.

== Career ==
From 1994 to 1997, Behm was an associate at Braun Kendrick Finbeiner in Saginaw, Michigan. From 1997 to 2008, she was an associate at Winegarden, Haley, Lindholm, & Robertson in Flint, Michigan. She was a solo practitioner from 2008 to 2009. She focused on business litigation and probate law while in private practice. Behm chaired the Domestic Relations Committee of the Michigan Probate Judges' Association and has served on the board of directors of Big Brothers Big Sisters of Flint and Genesee County.

== Judicial career ==
=== State court service ===
From April 10, 2009 to December 15, 2022, she served as probate judge of the Genesee County Circuit and Probate Courts after being appointed by Michigan Governor Jennifer Granholm. She was appointed to fill the vacancy left by the death of Judge Robert E. Weiss. Behm was assigned to the family division of the circuit court from May 2009 until December 2018 and was assigned to the general civil/criminal division and business court until she was appointed to federal court.

In December 2022 she dismissed two misdemeanor charges against former Michigan Governor Rick Snyder for the Flint Water crisis.

=== Federal judicial service ===
On June 29, 2022, President Joe Biden announced his intent to nominate Behm to serve as a United States district judge of the United States District Court for the Eastern District of Michigan. On July 11, 2022, her nomination was sent to the Senate. President Biden nominated Behm to the seat vacated by Judge David M. Lawson, who assumed senior status on August 6, 2021. On July 27, 2022, a hearing on her nomination was held before the Senate Judiciary Committee. On September 15, 2022, her nomination was reported out of committee by a 12–10 vote. On December 6, 2022, the United States Senate invoked cloture on her nomination by a 47–46 vote. Later that day, her nomination was confirmed by a 49–47 vote. She received her judicial commission on December 15, 2022, and was sworn in on the same day.

== Personal life ==
Behm is from Grand Blanc, Michigan. She lives with her husband, Michael Behm, an attorney.

Legal offices
| Preceded by David M. Lawson | Judge of the United States District Court for the Eastern District of Michigan; 2022–present | Incumbent |
