= Same-sex marriage in Michigan =

Same-sex marriage has been legal in Michigan since the U.S. Supreme Court's ruling in Obergefell v. Hodges on June 26, 2015. On March 21, 2014, the U.S. District Court for the Eastern District of Michigan ruled the state's denial of marriage rights to same-sex couples unconstitutional in DeBoer v. Snyder. More than 300 same-sex couples married in Michigan the next day before the Sixth Circuit Court of Appeals stayed enforcement of the district court's decision. On November 6, the Sixth Circuit reversed the lower court's ruling and upheld Michigan's ban on same-sex marriage. The Supreme Court overturned the Sixth Circuit's ruling and legalized same-sex marriage nationwide in the United States on June 26.

Michigan had previously banned the recognition of same-sex unions in any form, after a popular vote added an amendment to the State Constitution in 2004. A statute enacted in 1996 also banned both the licensing of same-sex marriages and the recognition of same-sex unions from other jurisdictions. In 2023, various politicians expressed their intention to introduce legislation repealing these now-defunct bans. Polling suggests that a large majority of Michiganders support the legal recognition of same-sex marriage, with a 2024 Public Religion Research Institute poll showing that 68% of respondents supported same-sex marriage.

== Legal restrictions ==
=== Statutes ===
After the Hawaii Supreme Court seemed poised to legalize same-sex marriage in Hawaii in Baehr v. Miike in 1993, the Michigan Legislature voted to ban same-sex marriage in June 1995, with the House of Representatives voting 88–14 in favour and the Senate voting 31–2. That same month, the House approved by a 74–28 vote a bill banning the recognition of out-of-state same-sex marriages. The Senate also approved the bill. Governor John Engler signed both bills into law.

In June 2023, Representative Jason Morgan introduced legislation to the Michigan Legislature to amend all gendered marital references in state statutes and repeal the statutory ban on same-sex marriages. The bill failed to pass before the end of the legislative session.

=== Constitutional amendment ===
In 2004, voters approved a constitutional amendment, Proposal 04-2, that banned same-sex marriage and civil unions in the Constitution of Michigan. It passed with 58.6% of the vote. The Michigan Supreme Court later ruled that public employers in Michigan could not grant domestic partnership benefits given the restrictions imposed by the amendment.

Following the 2022 elections, in which the Democratic Party won full control of the state government for the first time since 1983, some Democratic lawmakers said they were considering introducing a constitutional amendment to repeal the 2004 ban. Such a measure would require a two-thirds majority in both chambers of the Michigan Legislature and approval by voters in a referendum. Representative Jeremy Moss said, "Regardless of what happens with Obergefell in the future – which obviously, there is a threat it could be overturned – right now, we have unconstitutional language in our Constitution. […] We should be working now, as we should have been working, to repeal the language in our constitution that bans marriage equality." Attorney General Dana Nessel said she would push for such an amendment to be passed and placed on the ballot for approval by voters. In June 2023, Representative Morgan introduced a constitutional amendment to codify same-sex marriage in the Michigan Constitution and repeal the 2004 ban. Morgan said, "No couple in our state should live with the fear that their marriage could be put into jeopardy. While marriage between individuals of the same sex is currently protected through a ruling of the U.S. Supreme Court, the overturning of Roe v. Wade has made it clear how precarious our rights truly are. I am so excited to be marrying the love of my life, Jon, this year, and I will not rest until we protect the right to marriage for every couple in Michigan." A similar measure sponsored by 44 Democratic lawmakers was introduced to the House of Representatives in 2025, with a companion bill also introduced to the Senate. Advocates have also raised the possibility of collecting signatures for a ballot initiative repealing the ban.

== Lawsuits ==
Same-sex marriage in the United States

=== DeBoer v. Snyder ===
On January 23, 2012, a lesbian couple filed a lawsuit, DeBoer v. Snyder, in the U.S. District Court for the Eastern District of Michigan, challenging the state's ban on adoption by same-sex couples. In August 2012, Judge Bernard A. Friedman invited the couple to amend their suit to challenge the state's ban on same-sex marriage, "the underlying issue". On March 7, 2013, Friedman announced that he would delay ruling pending the outcome of two same-sex marriage cases before the U.S. Supreme Court, United States v. Windsor and Hollingsworth v. Perry. Friedman held a trial from February 25 to March 7, 2014. On March 21, he ruled for the plaintiffs, ending Michigan's denial of marriage rights to same-sex couples. Attorney General Bill Schuette immediately filed an emergency motion requesting a stay of the ruling. Friedman wrote:

Many Michigan residents have religious convictions whose principles govern the conduct of their daily lives and inform their own viewpoints about marriage. Nonetheless, these views cannot strip other citizens of the guarantees of equal protection under the law. The same Constitution that protects the free exercise of one's faith in deciding whether to solemnize certain marriages rather than others, is the same Constitution that prevents the state from either mandating adherence to an established religion, or "enforcing private moral or religious beliefs without an accompanying secular purpose." As a result, tradition and morality are not rational bases for the MMA [Michigan Marriage Amendment].

Four of Michigan's 83 county clerks opened their offices on Saturday, March 22, to issue marriage licenses to same-sex couples: Barbara Byrum of Ingham County, Nancy Waters of Muskegon County, Lisa Brown of Oakland County, and Lawrence Kestenbaum of Washtenaw County. The four counties issued 323 marriage licenses to same-sex couples that day. The Sixth Circuit Court of Appeals temporarily stayed enforcement of Friedman's ruling that same day, and stayed the ruling indefinitely on March 25. On March 28, U.S. Attorney General Eric Holder announced that the federal government would recognize the validity of the same-sex marriages licensed on March 22.

On November 6, 2014, the Sixth Circuit reversed the lower court's ruling and upheld Michigan's ban on same-sex marriage. The case was later incorporated into Obergefell v. Hodges and decided along with several other Sixth Circuit court cases related to the legality of state bans on same-sex marriage. On June 26, 2015, the U.S. Supreme Court handed down a ruling in favor of the plaintiffs and legalized same-sex marriage throughout the United States. The court held that the Due Process and Equal Protection clauses of the Fourteenth Amendment guarantee same-sex couples the right to marry. Governor Snyder issued the following statement, "Our state government will follow the law and our state agencies will make the necessary changes to ensure that we will fully comply", and Attorney General Schuette said the state would "honor, respect and uphold the decision of the Supreme Court of the United States". Representative Debbie Dingell said, "Love is love. It's not ours to judge. Today the Supreme Court affirmed that individuals can love whomever they choose. I'm simply happy for my friends, April and Jayne, who have five wonderful children they want to be able to adopt and love. I can't wait to attend their wedding." State Senator Jim Ananich called it a "great day for everyone who believes in equal rights", and Representative Sander Levin said it was a "historic day, reflecting what each of us knows in our hearts and within our communities, we are all equal and should be able to marry who we love." Representatives Brenda Lawrence and John Conyers also welcomed the court decision. The Majority Leader of the Michigan Senate, Arlan Meekhof, said he was "disappointed" and "concerned by the Court's decision to disregard states' rights in favor of the federal government". Michigan's Catholic bishops released a statement that the ruling would "have a significant ripple effect upon the first amendment right to religious liberty".

=== Caspar v. Snyder ===
Eight same-sex couples represented by the American Civil Liberties Union (ACLU) filed suit in U.S. district court on July 25, 2014, seeking recognition of their so-called "window marriages" established on March 22, 2014 during the legal time window before the Sixth Circuit stayed the district court's ruling in DeBoer. The state had asked the district court to suspend proceedings pending final resolution of DeBoer or to find those marriages invalid. On January 15, 2015, U.S. District Judge Mark A. Goldsmith ruled that the state must recognize those marriages, but stayed implementation of his ruling for 21 days. He wrote: "In these circumstances, what the state has joined together, it may not put asunder." On February 4, Governor Rick Snyder announced that the state would recognize those marriages and would not appeal the decision.

=== Carrick v. Snyder ===
In January 2015, Pastor Neil Patrick Carrick of Detroit brought a case, Carrick v. Snyder, against Michigan, arguing that the state's ban of same-sex marriage and polygamy violated the Free Exercise and Equal Protection clauses of the U.S. Constitution. The case was dismissed for lack of standing in February 2016.

== Developments after legalization ==
In December 2024, Representative Josh Schriver called for the criminalization of same-sex marriage, adding that "[t]his is not remotely controversial, nor extreme." His statement was widely criticized; "Please explain how dissolving my marriage, or that of the hundreds of thousands of other same-sex couples living in America, provides a benefit to your constituents or anyone else. You're not interested in helping Michiganders. You want only to hurt those you hate. Shame on you," said Attorney General Dana Nessel. Polling suggests that a large majority of Michiganders support the legal recognition of same-sex marriage. Referring to these opinion polls, the LGBTQ Nation and The Independent newspapers wrote that "Schriver's desire to criminalize [same-sex marriage] would be both controversial and extreme". In February 2025, Schriver, supported by six other Republican lawmakers, (Note: The lawmakers were Matt Maddock, Joseph Fox, Gregory Alexander, Jason Woolford, James DeSana, and Steve Carra.) introduced a resolution to the House of Representatives urging the U.S. Supreme Court to overturn Obergefell. In response, Representative Jennifer Conlin introduced a counter-resolution, sponsored by 29 other Democratic lawmakers, expressing support for Obergefell. Both measures failed to pass the House of Representatives.

== Native American nations ==
The Indian Civil Rights Act primarily aims to protect the rights of Native Americans but also reinforces the principle of tribal self-governance. While it does not grant sovereignty, the Act affirms the authority of tribes to govern their own legal affairs. Consequently, many tribes have enacted their own marriage and family laws. As a result, the Supreme Court's Obergefell ruling did not automatically apply to tribal jurisdictions. Same-sex marriage is legal on the reservations of the Bay Mills Indian Community, the Grand Traverse Band of Ottawa and Chippewa Indians, the Keweenaw Bay Indian Community, the Little Traverse Bay Bands of Odawa Indians, and the Sault Tribe of Chippewa Indians, five federally recognized Ojibwe tribes. The Little Traverse Bay Bands of Odawa Indians was the first Native American tribe to legalize same-sex marriage in Michigan when its Tribal Council voted to legalize in March 2013. The Tribal Chairman, Dexter McNamara, signed the legislation on March 15, 2013, and the first couple, Tim LaCroix and Gene Barfield, were married near Harbor Springs that same day. The Tribal Code (Ojibwe: Onaakonigewin) states: "Marriage means the legal and voluntary union of two persons to the exclusion of all others". The Keweenaw Bay Indian Community Tribal Council voted in November 2014 to hold a non-binding referendum on legalizing same-sex marriage on the reservation. The referendum was held on December 13, 2014, and passed with 54% of the vote. Provisions permitting same-sex marriages to be performed were included into the Tribal Code after the Tribal Council approved the changes on June 6, 2015. The Sault Tribe of Chippewa Indians legalized same-sex marriage on July 7, 2015, and the Bay Mills Executive Council approved a marriage ordinance permitting same-sex marriages to be solemnized on its reservation on July 8, 2019. Same-sex marriage has also been legal on the reservation of the Pokagon Band of Potawatomi Indians since May 8, 2013. Its Marriage Code (Potawatomi: Widegewen Dbaknegewen) defines marriage as a "civil contract between two (2) persons, regardless of their sex, creating a union to the exclusion of all others." The first same-sex marriage was performed for Daniel Hossler and Enrico Perez in Dowagiac on June 20, 2013. Same-sex marriage has also been legal in the Hannahville Indian Community since August 3, 2015, and the Nottawaseppi Huron Band of Potawatomi since March 16, 2023.

Native Americans have deep-rooted marriage traditions, placing a strong emphasis on community, family and spiritual connections. While there are no records of same-sex marriages being performed in Native American cultures in the way they are commonly defined in Western legal systems, many Indigenous communities recognize identities and relationships that may be placed on the LGBT spectrum. Among these are two-spirit individuals—people who embody both masculine and feminine qualities. In some cultures, two-spirit individuals assigned male at birth wear women's clothing and engage in household and artistic work associated with the feminine sphere. Historically, this identity sometimes allowed for unions between two people of the same biological sex. The Potawatomi refer to two-spirit individuals as mnedokwé (pronounced [mnədoˈkʷɛ], plural: mnedokwék). Traditionally, they "sought out female company" from an early age, possessed the "work skills" of both sexes, "talked like women", and were regarded as "esteemed persons with special spiritual powers". Ruth Landes reported in 1970 that they were "said to possess visions…but not to practice sorcery. [Mnedokwék] exemplified a distinct category of 'power'." They are known as niizh manidoowag (pronounced [niːʒ maˈnɪˌdoːˌwak]) in the Ojibwe language. Many were wives in polygynous households.

== Demographics and marriage statistics ==
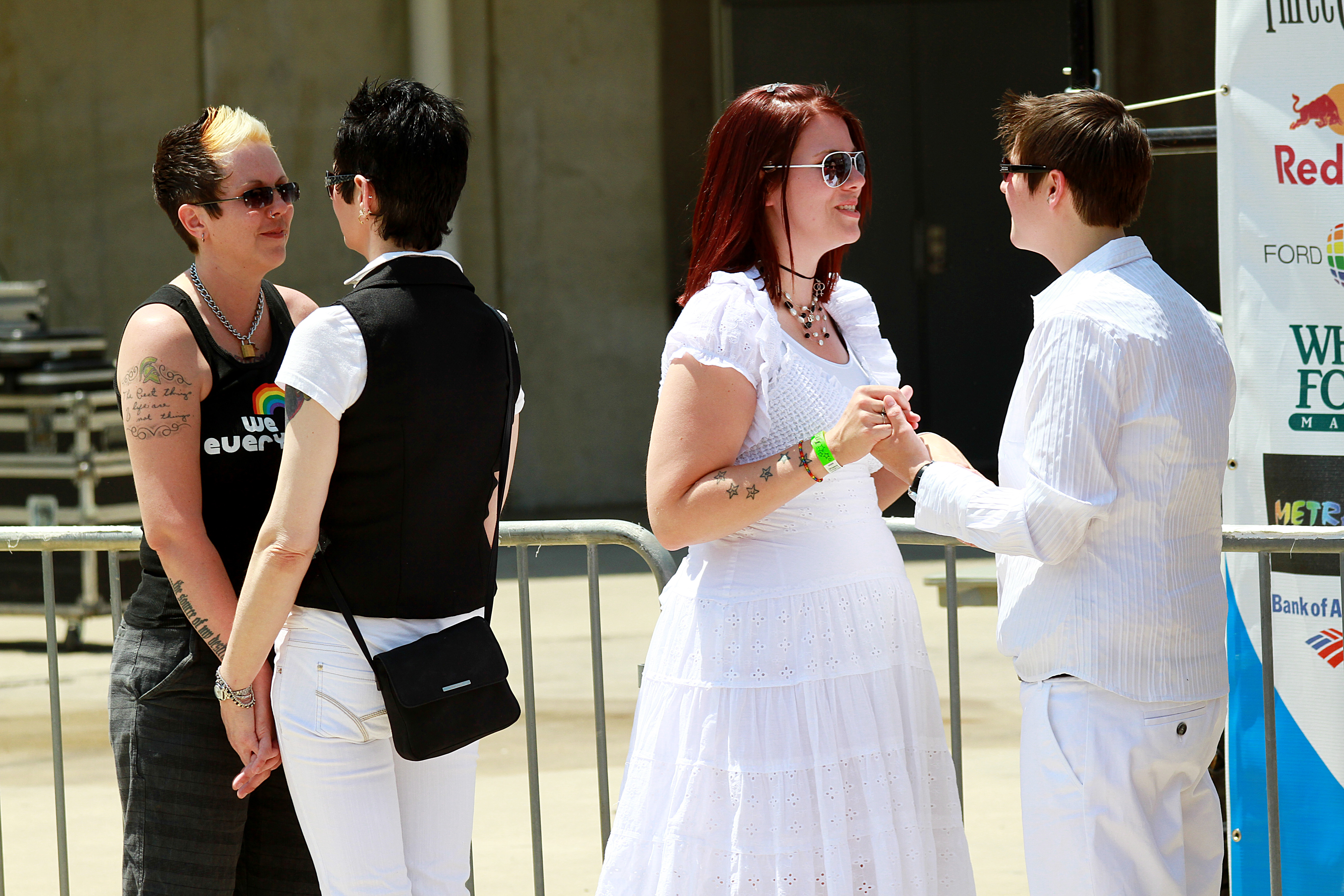
Same-sex couples exchanging symbolic wedding vows at Motor City Pride in June 2011, Philip A. Hart Plaza, Detroit

Data from the 2000 U.S. census showed that 15,368 same-sex couples were living in Michigan. By 2005, this had increased to more than 22,000 couples, likely attributed to same-sex couples' growing willingness to disclose their partnerships on government surveys. Same-sex couples lived in all counties of the state. Most couples lived in Wayne, Oakland and Macomb counties, but the county with the highest percentage of same-sex couples was Washtenaw (0.7% of all county households). Same-sex partners in Michigan were on average younger than opposite-sex partners, and more likely to be employed. However, the average and median household incomes of same-sex couples were lower than different-sex couples, and same-sex couples were also far less likely to own a home than opposite-sex partners. 18% of same-sex couples in Michigan were raising children under the age of 18, with an estimated 7,800 children living in households headed by same-sex couples in 2005.

2019 estimates from the United States Census Bureau showed that there were 23,727 same-sex households in Michigan, representing about 0.6% of all households in the state. The bureau estimated that 53% of same-sex couples in the state were married. The 2020 U.S. census showed that there were 13,875 married same-sex couple households (5,518 male couples and 8,357 female couples) and 12,306 unmarried same-sex couple households in Michigan.

== Domestic partnerships ==
In May 2008, the Michigan Supreme Court held that the amendment added to the State Constitution in 2004 banned not only same-sex marriage and civil unions, but also public employee domestic partnership benefits such as health insurance. The ruling, however, had little effect since most public employers relaxed their eligibility criteria to avoid violating the amendment's restrictions.

On September 15, 2011, the Michigan House of Representatives voted 64–44 to approve a bill that would have banned most public employers, though not colleges and universities, from offering health care benefits to the domestic partners of their employees. It did not apply to workers whose benefits are established by the Michigan Civil Service Commission. On December 7, 2011, the Michigan State Senate approved the bill in a 27–9 vote, and Governor Rick Snyder signed the legislation into law on December 22, 2011. Five same-sex couples challenged the law in Bassett v. Snyder. On June 28, 2013, U.S. District Judge David M. Lawson issued a preliminary injunction blocking the state from enforcing its law banning local governments and school districts from offering health care benefits to their employees' domestic partners. He wrote: "It is hard to argue with a straight face that the primary purpose—indeed, perhaps the sole purpose—of the statute is other than to deny health benefits to the same-sex partners of public employees. But that can never be a legitimate governmental purpose". He rejected the state's arguments that "fiscal responsibility" was the law's rationale. On February 14, 2014, the state asked him to lift that preliminary injunction, repeating its arguments about the "fiscal insecurity of local governments" and eliminating "irrational and unfair" local programs. On November 12, 2014, Judge Lawson issued a permanent injunction barring the state from enforcing this law.

While there are no statewide recognition, these local governments recognize domestic partnerships: Ann Arbor, Detroit, East Lansing, and Kalamazoo, as well as Ingham, Washtenaw, and Wayne counties.

== Public opinion ==
Public opinion for same-sex marriage in Michigan
Poll source	Dates administered	Sample size	Margin of error	Support	Opposition	Do not know / refused
Public Religion Research Institute	February 28 – December 8, 2025	696 adults	?	68%	29%	3%
Public Religion Research Institute	March 13 – December 2, 2024	650 adults	?	68%	29%	3%
Public Religion Research Institute	March 9 – December 7, 2023	715 adults	?	69%	27%	4%
Public Religion Research Institute	March 11 – December 14, 2022	?	?	68%	30%	2%
Public Religion Research Institute	March 8 – November 9, 2021	?	?	70%	28%	2%
Public Religion Research Institute	January 7 – December 20, 2020	1,670 adults	?	67%	29%	4%
Public Religion Research Institute	April 5 – December 23, 2017	2,348 adults	?	63%	29%	8%
Public Religion Research Institute	May 18, 2016 – January 10, 2017	2,997 adults	?	56%	36%	8%
Public Religion Research Institute	April 29, 2015 – January 7, 2016	2,379 adults	?	54%	38%	8%
Public Religion Research Institute	April 2, 2014 – January 4, 2015	1,670 adults	?	55%	37%	8%
New York Times/CBS News/YouGov	September 20 – October 1, 2014	2,560 likely voters	± 2.4%	47%	39%	14%
EPIC-MRA	September 25–29, 2014	600 adults	± 4.0%	47%	47%	6%
EPIC-MRA	May 17–20, 2014	600 likely voters	± 4.0%	47%	46%	7%
Marketing Resource Group of Lansing	March 2014	?	?	45%	50%	5%
State of the State Survey	December 16, 2013 – February 10, 2014	1,008 adults	± 3.1%	54%	36%	<0.5%
Glengariff Group Inc.	January 29 – February 1, 2014	600 likely voters	± 4.0%	56%	34%	<0.5%
EPIC-MRA	May 17–20, 2013	600 likely voters	± 4.0%	51%	41%	8%
Glengariff Group Inc.	May 8–10, 2013	600 voters	± 4.0%	57%	38%	5%
State of the State Survey	June 12 – August 13, 2012	1,015 adults	?	56%	39%	5%
Public Policy Polling	May 24–27, 2012	500 voters	± 4.4%	41%	45%	14%
Glengariff Group Inc.	May 10–11, 2012	600 likely voters	± 4.0%	44%	44%	12%
Public Policy Polling	July 21–24, 2011	593 voters	± 4.0%	33%	53%	14%
Glengariff Group Inc.	January 2011	?	?	39%	50%	11%
State of the State Survey	2010	?	?	48%	51%	1%
Glengariff Group Inc.	October 2004	?	?	24%	61%	15%

== See also ==
- LGBT rights in Michigan
- Michigan Proposal 04-2
- Domestic partnership in the United States
- Same-sex marriage in the United States
