= Beth Bashert =

American politician and LGBTQ+ activist

Mayor of Ypsilanti, Michigan
- In office November 2018 – June 23, 2020
- Preceded by: Amanda Edmonds
- Succeeded by: Lois Allen-Richardson

Beth Bashert is a Michigan LGBTQ+ rights activist, politician, and former mayor of Ypsilanti, Michigan.

== Activism ==
Bashert was a founding member and the first president of Michigan Equality, now known as Equality Michigan. In her work with the group, she applied voter outreach techniques that she learned while volunteering for the pro-choice group NARAL.

Bashert is a former board member of other LGBTQ+ organizations including Michigan Pride and the Jim Toy Community Center. Papers related to Bashert's activist career are held at the University of Michigan's Bentley Historical Library.

== Political career ==
Bashert was the (unopposed) Democratic candidate for the Ward 2 position on the Ypsilanti city council in 2016. After a brief stint on city council, she announced her candidacy for mayor of Ypsilanti in early 2018. She won the five-way race for mayor of Ypsilanti in November 2018.

Bashert resigned as mayor on June 23, 2020 after making a controversial comment about race during a city Zoom meeting that led to protests by city council and community members.
