= National Coalition of Anti-Violence Programs =

American national anti-violence organization

- National Coalition of Anti-Violence Programs logo
- Founded: 1995
- Location: New York City, New York
- Region served: United States and Ontario, Canada
- Website: avp.org/ncavp

The National Coalition of Anti-Violence Programs, or NCAVP, is a national organization dedicated to reducing violence and its impacts on lesbian, gay, bisexual and transgender (LGBTQ) individuals in the United States. It was founded in 1995 by Gloria McCauley of BRAVO and Jeffrey Montgomery of the Triangle Foundation (now Equality Michigan) and comprises over 40 community-based projects.

== Membership ==
NCAVP's membership currently includes over 40 community-based anti-violence projects serving LGBT individuals in cities and regions across the United States and Ontario. NCAVP works with their members to do research and document bias and hate crimes, domestic violence in LGBT relationships, sexual assault and abuse, "pick-up" crimes, and other characteristic forms of violence committed against LGBT individuals, and is dedicated "to helping local communities establish, promote and expand anti-violence education, prevention, organizing, advocacy and direct services".

Their members and affiliates include:

- Buckeye Region Anti Violence Org
- Center on Halsted
- Equality Michigan
- Fenway Community Health Center
- Los Angeles Gay and Lesbian Center
- National Leather Association International
- OutFront Minnesota
- RU12? Community Center

== Programs ==
=== Reports ===
NCAVP produces two annual reports on LGBT hate violence and LGBT intimate partner violence. NCAVP uses these reports to document and raise awareness of the prevalence of this violence, advocate for policy and funding changes that will increase resources to address LGBT violence, and recommend strategies.

=== Technical assistance ===
NCAVP assists local anti-violence projects by providing technical assistance and support for their anti-violence efforts such as referrals to best practices, information and materials from experts in the field.

The organization also provides direct rapid response to critical incidents of LGBT violence and assists local communities in their anti-violence efforts responding to violence.

== See also ==
- Violence against LGBT people
