= Michigan Organization for Human Rights =

Michigan Organization for Human Rights (MOHR)
- Founded: October 16, 1977
- Dissolved: Spring 1994
- Purpose: Eliminating discrimination
- Location: Detroit, Michigan
- Region served: Michigan
- Method: Lobbying, education, legal, and community events

The Michigan Organization for Human Rights (MOHR, /moʊr/) was a Michigan-based civil rights and anti-discrimination organization. It was founded in 1977 and disbanded in 1994, with most of its assets transferring to the University of Michigan Bentley Historical Library, Affirmations LGBT community center of Ferndale, and the Triangle Foundation—which replaced MOHR as the state's LGBTQ civil rights organization (today known as Equality Michigan).

== Activities ==
Although civil rights for lesbians and gay men were not intended to be the sole focus of the organization, an early goal of the organization was to focus on educational materials and legal advice concerning issues surrounding sexual orientation. In addition to political work, including managing a PAC, the organization also hosted LGBT community building events.

=== Political advocacy ===
Some of MOHR's political accomplishments include several court cases involving the rights of lesbian mothers and the rights of people living with HIV. Lobbying of the Michigan legislature resulted in increased funding for AIDS research, education, and care. The organization also lobbied several Michigan municipalities for domestic partnership and non-discrimination ordinances.

=== Education ===
MOHR utilized radio and cable television as a means of informing the public about issues concerning discrimination based on sexual orientation and about the prevention and treatment of AIDS.

=== Another Voice ===
In 1973, WDET in Detroit began airing a weekly radio program, "Gayly Speaking," which continued until 1982 when it was replaced with "Another Voice," a new program produced by MOHR. As Detroit's first radio program "by, for, and about gays and gay liberation," the program focused on such topics as coming out, oppression, religion, and gays in film, theater, literature, and music. Programs included a news and announcement segment and often featured prominent organizations and events, such as Gay Pride Week, Detroit's Gay Community Center, and the Gay Switchboard.

=== Michigan Human Rights Campaign Committee ===
The Michigan Human Rights Campaign Committee was established in 1985 as a political action committee serving the interest of Michigan's LGBTQ community. The name was changed to Pride PAC in 1995, later to Triangle Pride PAC, and is today known as the Equality Michigan Pride PAC.

=== Michigan Organization for Human Rights March ===
In 1986, Craig Covey and MOHR organized the Michigan Organization for Human Rights March, Michigan's first gay and lesbian march in Detroit. From 1986 to 1988, the civil rights march took place down Woodward Avenue followed by a rally at Kennedy Square. A party took place at the McGregor Center on the campus of Wayne State University following the rally, organized by a small number of dedicated gay and lesbian groups and volunteers. In 1989, the Gay and Lesbian civil rights march was moved to the more central location of Lansing to attract statewide participation and political awareness as well as to celebrate the 20th anniversary of New York City's Stonewall Riots.

=== Michigan Privacy Challenge ===
One of MOHR's most successful projects from 1988 to 1990 was the Michigan Privacy Challenge, a series of lawsuits filed by the organization on behalf of individual plaintiffs that challenged the constitutionality of Michigan's sodomy and gross indecency laws. The Wayne County Circuit Court's decision in 1990 supported MOHR's position and was not appealed by the State of Michigan.

==== Michigan Organization for Human Rights v. Kelley ====
Michigan's crime against nature and gross indecency laws were briefly overturned in Wayne County by Michigan Organization for Human Rights v. Kelley when MOHR won the case in Michigan's Wayne County Circuit Court on July 9, 1990. While the state did not appeal the ruling, the laws were upheld, in a 10–3 vote, by the Michigan Court of Appeals, in People v. Brashier on December 29, 1992, effectively reversing MOHR v. Kelly.

== History ==
=== Founding ===
After a series of meetings of community leaders in Detroit in the summer of 1977, the Michigan Organization for Human Rights (MOHR) was founded at an organizing conference attended by 50 people and held in Lansing, Michigan, on October 15 and 16, 1977. The mission of the organization was broadly conceived, so that it could serve as a resource for the numerous local, state, and national human rights organizations engaged in efforts to eliminate discrimination.

=== Growth ===
In its early years, MOHR meetings rotated around the state, primarily being held in Southeast Michigan. In September 1978, a staffed office was established in Detroit and an executive director was hired to guide the organization's lobbying, outreach, and fundraising efforts. By 1979, the funding of a staffed office and time commitments required for MOHR work were causing unforeseen pressures on both the organization and those who directed it. The resulting resignation of the first executive director led to the first in a series of reorganizations. MOHR's dependence on financial contributions from its constituent organizations proved untenable and, by the early 1980s, the organization had shifted its primary fundraising efforts to individuals. In 1985, the organization hired an executive director from Ohio, Craig Covey, in part because of the large and successful Gay and Lesbian civil rights marches he organized in Columbus—which would be helpful later when the organization organized a gay and lesbian march.

=== Conflicts and closure ===
While the Michigan Privacy Challenge (1988–90) was helping advance the organization's policy efforts, internal problems continued with personality conflicts and disagreements over financial commitments and priorities. The latter half of the 1980s included frequent resignations, reform proposals, and dire predictions from factions of the board of directors. These struggles resulted in decreased support from the organization's constituents and funders. Decreased supported, combined with the founding of new lesbian and gay social and political organizations in Southeast Michigan, resulted in the organization being less effective in their political and fundraising efforts. After one final reorganization attempt, the Michigan Organization for Human Rights disbanded in the spring of 1994.

Many of the organization's assets, including their offices, were transferred to Triangle Foundation (today Equality Michigan) as the organization added public policy advocacy to their existing anti-violence work. Many board members, including Henry D. Messer and John Monahan, also joined Triangle Foundation. Most of their community support efforts became a part of the work of Affirmations, the LGBT community center in Ferndale, Michigan. The archives of MOHR were transferred to the Bentley Historical Library at the University of Michigan in Ann Arbor. Bentley has gone on to house the historical archives of many of Michigan's LGBT organizations, including Affirmations, Triangle Foundation, and Equality Michigan.

== See also ==
- Equality Michigan
- LGBT rights in Michigan
