= Saucy Sylvia =

Canadian-American entertainer

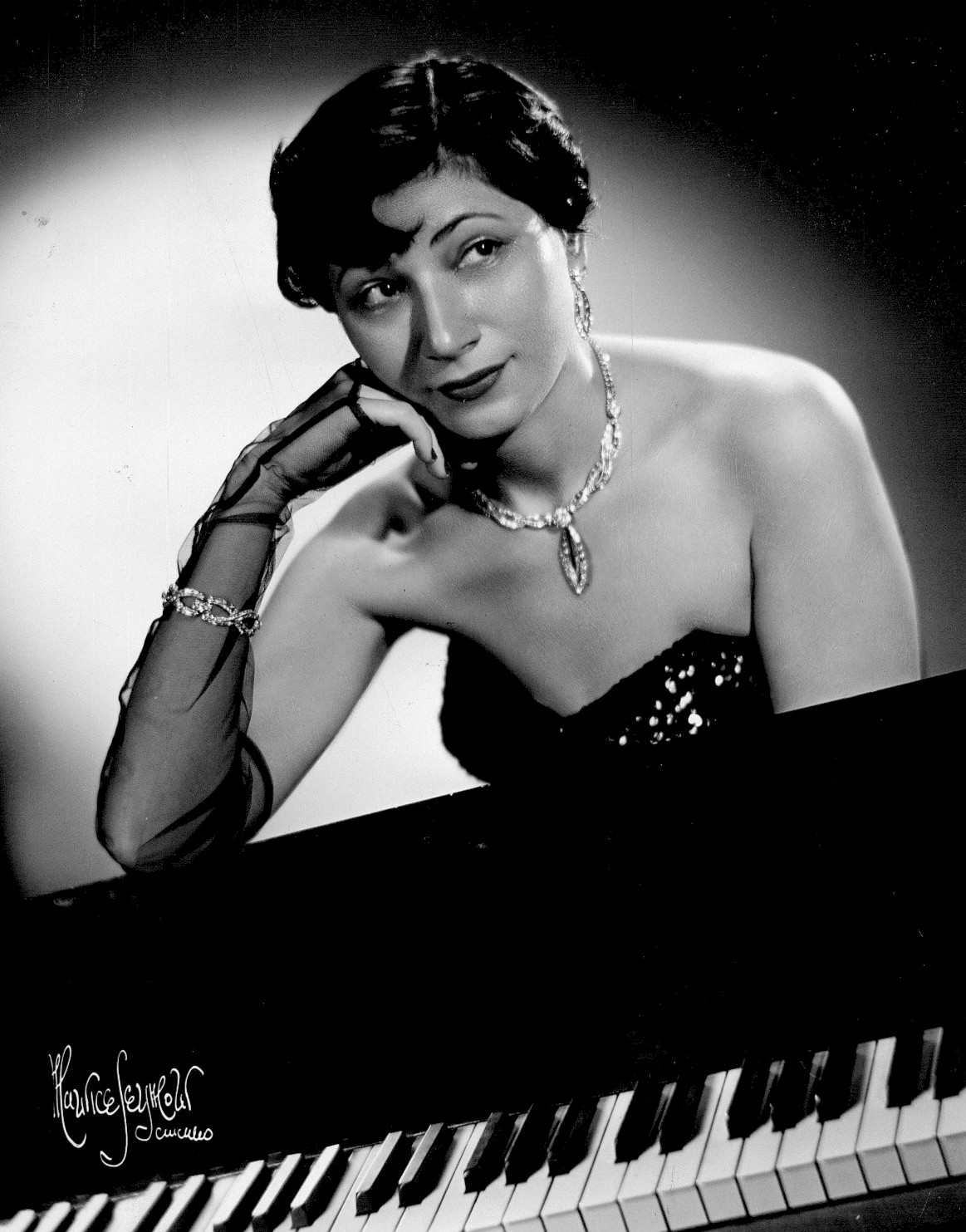
- in 1962
- Born: Sylvia Cadeski; July 27, 1920; Owen Sound, Ontario, Canada
- Died: May 25, 2017 (aged 96); Newport, Rhode Island, US
- Occupations: Entertainer, pianist, comedian, humorist
- Spouse(s): Meyer J. Stoun (?–1960s; his death), Michael L. Mureddu (1970s–2013; his death)

Sylvia Cadeski (July 27, 1920 – May 25, 2017), known professionally as Saucy Sylvia, was a Canadian-born American comedian, classically trained pianist, singer, and radio personality.

== Biography ==
=== Early life and career ===
Saucy Sylvia was born Sylvia Cadeski in Owen Sound, Ontario, Canada in 1920, and grew up in the small village of Mount Forest. At age 6, she began playing the piano, which she learned from the nuns at Sisters of St. Joseph Academy. She played in a country band in high school. Sylvia eventually graduated from the Conservatory of Music in Toronto. She later left the university of Toronto with a teaching degree and a masters in languages and while in school, she worked at a small local radio station and hosted her own radio show while in college in Toronto.

She decided she really wanted to try show business, and went out on the road. While she played in Indiana, a bandleader named Barney Rapp landed her audition as a staff vocalist, and before long Saucy went on the air at WLW in Cincinnati. At the time it was clear channel and could be heard all over the country.

Sylvia was a staff singer; at the time two young sisters also sang at the station, Rosemary Clooney and Betty Clooney. Big names dropped by the "Sylvia Show" like Ella Fitzgerald and Duke Ellington. At the same time, Sylvia played a steady gig at the La Normandie Restaurant for five years and eventually moved to Detroit, MI with her first husband Mike Stoun where she worked comedy in her act. She toured off and on and in Arizona, a promoter billed her as "Saucy Sylvia" on the marquee, giving Sylvia her first new name. After her husband died, she continued performing across the country. She recorded two albums "Sex is the thing that started it all" and "0069". She eventually moved to Newport, Rhode Island where she met her second husband Mike Mureddu.

=== Style ===
Saucy was known to engage her audience directly, making them part of the act. Women from all over the world (estimated over 1/2 million) wear "I walk for Sauce" buttons announcing their affiliation of the Saucy Sylvia fan club. The Walk for Sauce fan club song was sung and the celebration continued through almost three hours without a break. Saucy's memory was one of the things that made her so special. Part of her act involved asking audience members for their names and where they were from. She would then include each person's name in songs and comedy, no matter how large the audience. What was intriguing was her ability to capture all ages from college to seniors.

=== Later career ===
For Saucy, work was a labor of love. Saucy became the President of the Newport Federation of Musicians. She retained that role for more than 20 years working to finding work for area musicians in films and large venue shows. Saucy played the Auld Mug Lounge at the Goat Island Hotel which changed names ownership from Sheraton to the Double Tree, and now Hyatt. Saucy is known as an icon in Newport, Rhode Island and the Auld Mug lounge was her room for over 30 years where she entertained millions from around the work including national and international dignitaries and international celebrities. Saucy had one of the last live music radio shows "The Miss Saucy Sylvia Show" which aired on WADK every Sunday for 26 years. When she was first approached by the radio station to do the show, her husband Mike was all for it and was trying to convince her to say yes. She agreed on one condition. He wrote the show each week. Mike wrote, produced and directed and even became part of the act. The show went on for 26 years starting in 1976. The show featured many artist wither locally or coming in town for one of the music festivals. Saucy was inducted in the Newport Jazz Hall of Fame in 2002 along with Ella Fitzgerald and George Wein for their achievements.

=== Other endeavors ===
Saucy was very active in the American federation of Musicians and was the President of the Newport, Rhode Island Federation of Musicians. She started the music scholarship program for the Newport public schools. She won many awards for her achievements including proclamations from both the City of Newport and the State of Rhode Island for her work. In 2014, she was inducted into the Rhode Island Radio Hall of Fame.

== Family ==
After being widowed for three years, Saucy married Mike Mureddu, the father of eight children. Mureddu died in May 2013. The couple had 21 grandchildren and 7 great-grandchildren. Sylvia died on May 25, 2017, at the age of 96.

== Discography ==
1. Agent 0069 (LP, 1966)
2. Sex is the thing that started it all (LP, 1967)
3. "Rindercella Spoonerism" (45, 1966)
4. "Little Hood Riding Red Spoonerism" (45, 1966)
5. "The Three Little Bears – Italian Style Spoonerism" (45)

== Filmography ==
- Here's Saucy (2004)
- Newport Jazz '94 (1994) PBS Concert Film. Saucy appears at the opening and closing of the film and threads throughout. Plays as loose narrator, spirit of Newport.
