= Equality Michigan =

LGBTQ+ advocacy organization in Michigan, USA

- U.S. State of Michigan
- Founded: 1991
- Type: 501(c)(3)
- Tax ID no.: 38-2556668
- Location: Detroit, Michigan
- Region served: Michigan
- Key people: Stephanie White, executive director
- Revenue: $695,922 (2010)
- Employees: 5
- Website: equalitymi.org
- Formerly called: Michigan Organization for Human Rights, Triangle Foundation, and Michigan Equality

Equality Michigan is an American civil rights, advocacy and anti-violence organization serving Michigan's lesbian, gay, bisexual and transgender (LGBTQ) community. Equality Michigan serves Michigan's LGBT community through victims services, lobbying on behalf of the LGBT community, public education on LGBT issues, and organizing Michigan's largest LGBT events such as Motor City Pride. The organization is a founding member of the Equality Federation.

== History ==
In 1991, the Triangle Foundation was founded by Jeffrey Montgomery, Henry D. Messer, and John Monahan as an anti-violence organization. Triangle Foundation expanded its mission in 1994 to include political and policy work following the closure of the Michigan Organization for Human Rights. Michigan Equality was founded by Lisa Hansknecht, Beth Bashert, Stephanie McLean, and Tom Base in 1999, following successful electoral campaign efforts in support of LGBT rights in seven Michigan cities, including Ypsilanti, Kalamazoo, Traverse City, Huntington Woods, and others. It was originally created to be a political organization and voter activist group, collecting names and creating an active list of progressive votes in support of LGBTQ+ rights. Triangle Foundation merged with Michigan Equality to create Equality Michigan in 2010.

== Structure ==
Equality Michigan Action Fund
- Type: 501(c)(4)
- Location: Lansing, Michigan
- Formerly called: Triangle Foundation Action Fund and Michigan Equality

Equality Michigan Pride PAC
- Type: PAC
- Location: Kalamazoo, Michigan
- Website: equalitymiaction.org
- Formerly called: Michigan Pride PAC, Triangle Pride PAC, and Michigan Equality PAC

Equality Michigan, a 501(c)(3) nonprofit organization, is the primary organization using the Equality Michigan brand. Equality Michigan Action Fund is a 501(c)(4) nonprofit organization affiliated with, but independent from, Equality Michigan. The Equality Michigan Pride PAC is a political action committee (PAC) affiliated with, but independent from, the Equality Michigan Action Fund.

== Victim services program ==
Equality Michigan's Victim Services Program documents and addresses the pervasive problem of violence committed against the actual or perceived LGBT and HIV-affected communities. Victim Services offers free and confidential support to victims of bias crimes, domestic violence, pick-up crimes, police misconduct, HIV-related violence, rape, and sexual assault. In addition, Equality Michigan provides accompaniments and advocacy for clients with the police, the courts, medical, and social service agencies. The organization works to get legal services offered at a reduced fee for low-income clients and help clients tell their story in order to raise awareness about the incidents that occurred to them. Data collected through this program is published annually through the National Coalition of Anti-Violence Programs - which Triangle Foundation co-founded.

== Policy program ==
Equality Michigan works to enact policy and legislative changes in Michigan to promote equality for LGBT people in such areas as housing and employment, prevent hate crimes, and to stop anti-LGBT legislation and similar measures from being introduced.

== Community events ==
Equality Michigan's community events are intended to bring together and build the Michigan LGBT community.

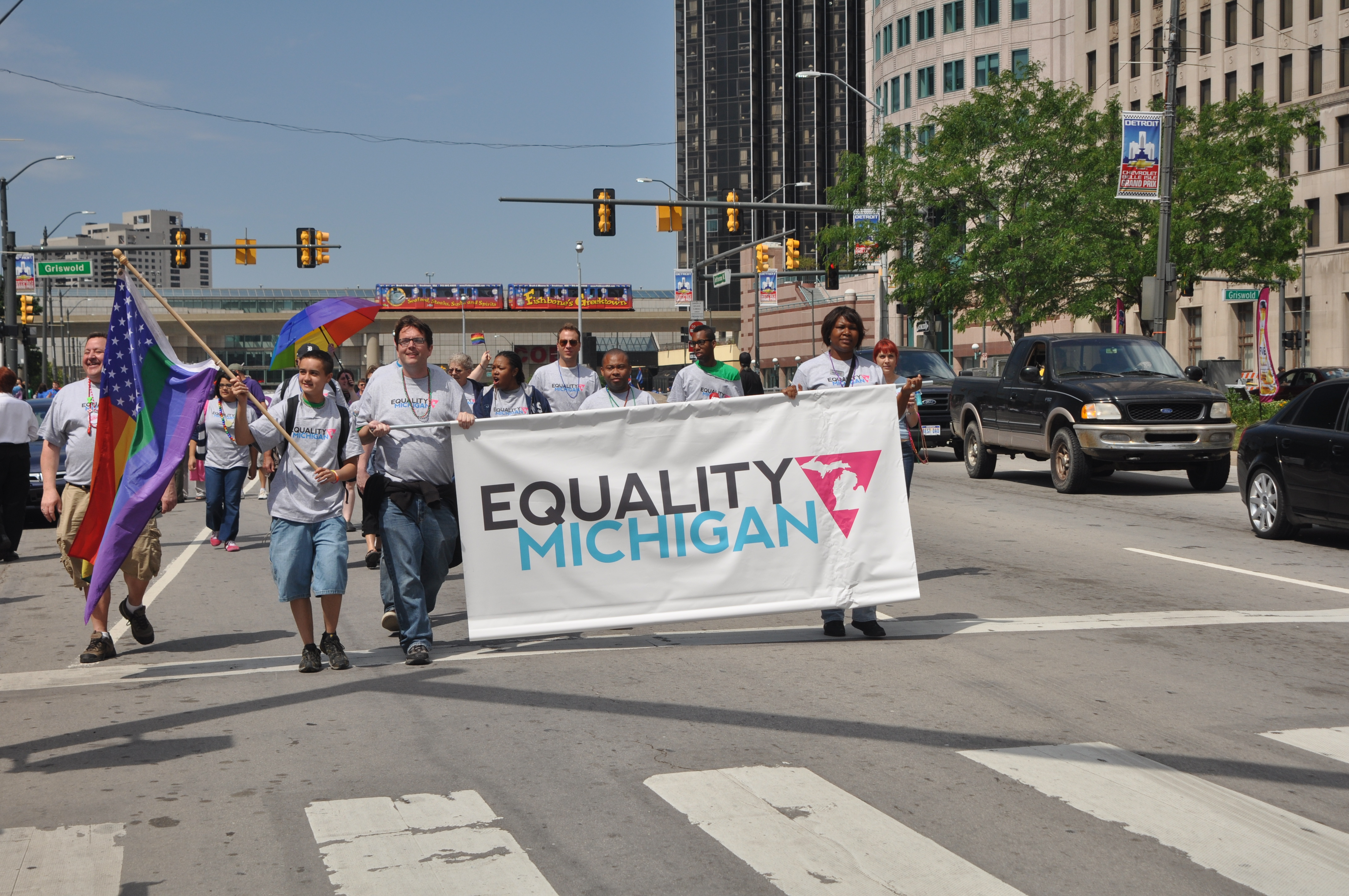
Equality Michigan in the 2012 Parade.

=== Motor City Pride ===
An annual Pride street festival held in Hart Plaza in Detroit, Michigan the second Saturday and Sunday of every June to celebrate the LGBT community. Previously held in Ferndale, Michigan, the festival moved to Detroit in 2011. It is the largest LGBT event held in Michigan. The event showcases both local and national performers including Nickki Stevens, The Fundamentals.

=== Michigan LGBT ComedyFest ===
ComedyFest is an annual comedy festival featuring national comedians held in Dearborn, Michigan for the LGBT community. Comedians performing have included Sean Hetherington (2005), René Hicks (2006), Ian Harvie (2009), and Julie Goldman (2014).

=== Equality Michigan Annual Dinner Event ===
Equality Michigan's Annual Dinner Event begins with a cocktail reception with a silent auction. The dinner features a keynote speaker and the presentation of "Catalyst Awards" recognizing individuals and organizations for excellence in service to Michigan's LGBT community. The event is attended by several community leaders and elected officials. Past speakers have included:

- Patricia Ireland (1999)
- Kate Kendell (2001)
- Patricia Nell Warren (2002)
- Matt Foreman (2004)
- Mary Frances Berry (2005)
- Carl Sciortino, Jr. (2006)
- Barry W. Lynn (2007)
- Evan Wolfson (2009)
- Cleve Jones (2011)
- Wade Davis (2012)

== Education and outreach ==
Equality Michigan provides diversity trainings on social and political LGBT issues. This program also educates politicians, doctors, lawyers, teachers, and law enforcement professionals about issues related to the LGBT community.

== Catalyst Awards ==
Each year at their annual dinner, the organization presents awards, called Catalyst Awards, to individuals, groups or organizations advocating for LGBT persons in Michigan. Some awards named after individuals, such as the Henry D. Messer Youth Activist Award, are given multiple years to honor specific types of actions.

=== Past Catalyst Award recipients ===
Some past recipients of a Catalyst Award include:

- Showtimes's Queer as Folk (2003)
- Ruth Ellis Center (2006)
- Jim Toy (2007 - Heather MacAllister Award)
- Pride at Work (2007)
- Grand Valley State University (2008)
- State Senator Glenn Anderson (2011)
- Cleve Jones (2011 - Lifetime Achievement Award)
- Wade Davis (2012)
- State Senator Gretchen Whitmer (2012)
- Senator Carl Levin (2012)
- Lisa Brown (2014)
- Barbara Byrum (2014)
- KICK (2014)

== See also ==
- LGBT rights in Michigan
- LGBT history in Michigan
- Same-sex marriage in Michigan
- List of LGBT rights organizations
