= LGBTQ rights in Michigan =

- Michigan
- Legal status: Legal since 2003 (Lawrence v. Texas)
- Gender identity: Altering sex on a birth certificate does not require sex reassignment surgery
- Discrimination protections: Sexual orientation and gender identity protections codified in 2023 (see below)

Family rights
- Recognition of relationships: Same-sex marriage since 2015
- Adoption: Yes

Lesbian, gay, bisexual, and transgender (LGBTQ) people in the U.S. state of Michigan enjoy the same rights as non-LGBTQ people. Same-sex sexual activity is legal in Michigan under the U.S. Supreme Court case Lawrence v. Texas, although the state legislature has not repealed its sodomy law. Same-sex marriage was legalized in accordance with 2015's Obergefell v. Hodges decision. Discrimination on the basis of both sexual orientation and gender identity is unlawful since July 2022 by a Michigan supreme court ruling and codified later by the legislature in 2023. Conversion therapy as well as the gay/trans panic defense were both banned in 2023 and 2024 respectively by the Michigan legislature.

Michigan in June 2024 was ranked "the most welcoming U.S. state for LGBT individuals". Michigan is home to a vibrant LGBT community. East Lansing and Ann Arbor were the first cities in the United States to pass LGBT discrimination protections, doing so in 1972. Pride parades have been held in the state's most populous city, Detroit, since 1986, and today attract thousands of people. While a majority of Michiganders support same-sex marriage, the formerly Republican-controlled Legislature had mostly ignored LGBT-related legislation, and as such progress had been slow (and had thus mostly come from the courts and local municipalities).

== Legality of same-sex sexual activity ==
Equality Michigan is the state's most prominent LGBT advocacy group.

Sexual acts between persons of the same sex are legal in Michigan. They had been criminalized until the state's sodomy laws, which applied to both homosexuals and heterosexuals, were invalidated in 2003 by the United States Supreme Court's decision in Lawrence v. Texas. However, Michigan has not yet legislatively repealed its sodomy law. Massachusetts and Michigan are the only northern U.S. states where same-sex sexual activity has not been codified into statutory law.

== Recognition of same-sex relationships ==
Same-sex marriage

Constitutional amendment

In 2004, voters approved a constitutional amendment, Michigan Proposal 04-2, that banned same-sex marriage and civil unions in the state. It passed with 58.6% of the vote.

=== Statutes ===
In June 1995, the Michigan House of Representatives voted 88–14 to ban same-sex marriage in the state, and the Michigan State Senate voted 31–2 in favor. That same month, the House approved by a 74–28 vote a bill banning recognition of out-of-state same-sex marriages. The Senate also approved this bill. Governor John Engler signed both bills into law.

In June 2023, Representative Jason Morgan introduced legislation to the Michigan Legislature to amend all gendered marital references in state statutes and repeal the statutory ban on same-sex marriages. The bill failed to pass before the end of the legislative session.

Lawsuits

On January 23, 2012, a lesbian couple filed a lawsuit, DeBoer v. Snyder in United States District Court for the Eastern District of Michigan, challenging the state's ban on adoption by same-sex couples in order to jointly adopt their children. On March 21, 2014, U.S. District Judge Bernard Friedman ruled the state's ban on same-sex marriage unconstitutional. Attorney General Bill Schuette filed for an emergency stay of his ruling with the Sixth Circuit Court of Appeals. On Saturday, March 22, 2014, four of Michigan's 83 county clerks opened their offices for special hours and issued more than 300 marriage licenses to gay and lesbian couples. Later that day, the Sixth Circuit stayed Judge Friedman's order until March 26. On March 25, 2014, the Sixth Circuit stayed the ruling indefinitely. On March 28, 2014, U.S. Attorney General Eric Holder announced the Federal Government will recognize the same-sex marriages performed on March 22.

On November 6, 2014, the Sixth Circuit reversed the lower court's ruling and upheld Michigan's ban on same-sex marriage. On June 26, 2015, the U.S. Supreme Court ruled in Obergefell v. Hodges that same-sex couples have a nationwide right to marry, legalizing same-sex marriage in the United States, and Michigan.

=== Domestic partnerships ===
Map of Michigan counties and cities that offer domestic partner benefits either county-wide or in particular cities. City offers domestic partner benefits County-wide partner benefits through domestic partnership County or city does not offer domestic partner benefits

The Michigan Supreme Court ruled that the constitutional amendment forbidding recognition of same-sex relationships meant that public employers in Michigan could not legally grant domestic partnership benefits to their employees. A law in effect since December 2011 banned most public employers, though not colleges and universities, from offering health benefits to the domestic partners of their employees. It did not extend to workers whose benefits are established by the Michigan Civil Service Commission. On June 28, 2013, U.S. District Judge David M. Lawson issued a preliminary injunction blocking the state from enforcing its law banning local governments and school districts from offering health benefits to their employees' domestic partners. He made that injunction permanent on November 12, 2014, when he ruled in Bassett v. Snyder that Michigan's restrictions on domestic partnership benefits were not related to a legitimate government purpose. He distinguished his ruling from the Sixth Circuit's ruling in DeBoer: "It is one thing to say [as in DeBoer] that states may cleave to the traditional definition of marriage as a means of encouraging biologically complementary couples to stay together and raise the offspring they produce.... It is quite another to say that a state may adopt a narrow definition of family, and pass laws that penalize those unions and households that do not conform."

== Family Making ==
=== Parental Rights ===
In September 2019, a U.S. District Court Judge in Michigan granted a preliminary injunction allowing a state-contracted, faith-based adoption agency to refuse to certify same–sex couples or single LGBTQ+ individuals for adoption or foster care while its lawsuit against the state proceeds. The agency, St. Vincent Catholic Charities, argued that requiring it to serve LGBTQ+ prospective parents would violate its “sincerely held religious beliefs.”

In July 2023, the Michigan Supreme Court made an official ruling that fully guarantees legal parental rights, responsibilities and obligations for same-sex couples who have children or a child - even before same-sex marriage went into effect known a retrospective policy.

=== Adoption ===
Michigan has no statutory ban on same-sex couples adopting, and no Michigan state court has ever interpreted Michigan's statute as prohibiting such adoptions. However, at least one other state court has ruled that unmarried individuals may not jointly petition to adopt.

Two Michigan lesbians, who are raising three children adopted by only one of them, filed a lawsuit known as DeBoer v. Snyder in federal court in January 2012 seeking to have the state's ban on adoption by same-sex couples overturned. and in September amended that suit to challenge the state's ban on same-sex marriage as well.

In December 2012, the Michigan Court of Appeals, an intermediate-level court, ruled in Usitalo v. Landon that the state's courts have jurisdiction to grant second-parent adoptions by same-sex couples.

Following the U.S. Supreme Court's ruling striking down Michigan's ban on same-sex marriage, Michigan courts have been granting adoption rights to same-sex couples.

=== Surrogacy ===
The United States Supreme Court sets no precedents on surrogate-parenting agreements; hence, it is left for state courts to rule on the matter. In 1981, the Michigan Appeals Court ruled in Doe v. Kelley that state law upholds individuals' privacy to engage in noncommercial surrogacy agreements (cite). However, a 1988 case in New Jersey shifted national public opinions on surrogate parenting and was reflected in state legislation.

The Michigan Surrogate Parenting Act (SPA), passed in 1988, ruled that individuals could not enter a gestational surrogacy contract involving compensation. It defined compensation as payment beyond medical expenses incurred during pregnancy. The SPA also ruled that commercial surrogacy contracts were void and unenforceable, and criminalized participation in compensated surrogacy with a contract. It did not provide legal protection for intended parents or the surrogate.

In 1992, the case Doe v. Attorney General upheld the Surrogate Parenting Act. Within this case, the Michigan Court of Appeals laid out interests that the SPA was attempting to protect. It has not yet been determined whether or not the interests in this case are favored by the SPA. Some argue that the revision and assessment of these interests are necessary due to the headway made with reproductive technology.

The appellate court decided to uphold the SPA for three reasons. To begin, surrogacy, as something that can be paid for, brought concern for the commodification of children, arguing that they were being treated as merchandise. Secondly, it was argued that by upholding the SPA, the best interest of the child was prioritized as well. Mainly, the court stated that because the interests of the parents were most present during surrogacy, there was an incapacity to properly take into account the potential emotional trauma faced by the child. Thirdly, it was contended that the exploitation of women, and the idea of them being reduced to their reproductive power, was a major apprehension of the argument to replace the SPA.

In March 2024, a bill passed both houses of the Michigan Legislature decriminalising commercial (paid, not altruistic) surrogacy contracts. The Governor of Michigan signed the bill into law.

Surrogacy law is relevant for LGBTQ+ couples looking to have children, especially for gay men, as the percentage of LGBTQ+ couples seeking surrogacy services is rising each year.

=== In Vitro Fertilization (IVF) ===
IVF and other forms of assisted reproductive technology are widely considered to be LGBTQ+ rights issues, as many of these individuals and same-sex couples rely on these medical procedures, such as donor insemination, IVF, and surrogacy, to have children. After the Dobbs v. Jackson Women's Health Organization decision in 2022, researchers at the Rutgers School of Public Health noted that many Americans lost access to non-abortion reproductive services, including IVF, highlighting how shifts in reproductive-care law can jeopardize family formation opportunities for the LGBTQ+ population.

As of April 1 of 2024, Gov. Whitmer signed the Michigan Family Protection Act, which included nine bills. The acts include topics such as surrogacy, IVF, and equality for LGBTQ+ parents. Specifically, the bill ensures that “children born by surrogacy and assisted reproductive technology (including IVF) are treated equally under the law” which was not ensured before the bill.

== Discrimination protections ==
On December 23, 2003, Governor Jennifer Granholm issued an executive order prohibiting employment discrimination state-level public sector employment on the basis of sexual orientation. The order only covers employees of the state of Michigan and does not cover public sector employees of county, school, or local-level governments. On November 22, 2007, Governor Jennifer Granholm extended her executive order to include gender identity. This executive order was kept under Governor Rick Snyder.

On March 14, 2013, the Michigan Senate passed, by a 37–0 vote, an emergency harbor dredging funding bill that made private marinas ineligible for a new loan program if they discriminate based on sexual orientation. On March 20, 2013, the Michigan House of Representatives passed the bill by a vote of 106–4. On March 27, 2013, Governor Rick Snyder signed an emergency harbor dredging funding bill that made private marinas ineligible for a new loan program if they discriminate based on sexual orientation.

In January 2019, Governor Gretchen Whitmer issued an executive order prohibiting discrimination on the basis of both sexual orientation and gender identity in all areas of state government employment, including by employers receiving contracts and in grants from the state.

In March 2023, a bill Codifying the ELCRA protections passed the Michigan Legislature by a majority vote - the bill formally codify both "sexual orientation and gender identity" anti-discrimination protections embedded within Michigan legislation. The bill was signed into law by Governor Gretchen Whitmer on March 8, 2023.

In June 2023, an LGBTQ+ Commission was established within Michigan - by the Governor of Michigan.

In October 2023, insurance companies and corporations within Michigan are explicitly banned from discriminating against individuals on the basis of sexual orientation and gender identity - under a bill that passed both houses of the Michigan Legislature. Governor Gretchen Whitmer signed the bill into law.

=== 2018 Civil Rights Commission decision ===
In September 2017, after the legislature had voted 11 times to reject protecting LGBTQ people from discrimination, LGBT activists asked the Michigan Civil Rights Commission to declare sexual orientation and gender identity discrimination a form of sex discrimination and as such outlaw it under the Elliott-Larsen Civil Rights Act.

On May 21, 2018, the Commission interpreted the Elliott-Larsen Civil Rights Act as banning discrimination based on sexual orientation and gender identity through the category of sex. The Commission voted 5–0 to interpret existing anti-discrimination laws as including both categories. The Michigan Department of Civil Rights began processing complaints of discrimination on May 22. This decision effectively means that LGBT discrimination is now illegal under state law. The decision was hailed by human rights group, but denounced by conservative groups.

Michigan Attorney General Bill Schuette hit back at the decision, accusing the Commission of overstepping its authority. In July 2018, Schuette said that the decision is "invalid because it conflicts with the original intent of the Legislature as expressed in the plain language of the state's civil rights law". The Commission subsequently reiterated its support for the decision, and the Department of Civil Rights announced that it would continue to investigate discrimination complaints based on sexual orientation and gender identity. "The Michigan Civil Rights Commission is an independent, constitutionally created and established body," Agustin V. Arbulu, director of the Department of Civil Rights, said. "The Commission is not bound by the opinion of the Attorney General. The only recourse is for the courts to determine if issuing the interpretive statement was within the scope of the commission's authority, and that is the appropriate venue for resolving this issue." The Detroit Free Press denounced Schuette for the opinion, calling it a "shameful display of bigotry", also condemning Schuette for his association with President Donald Trump, who had endorsed him for that year's gubernatorial election, which Schuette lost to Democrat Gretchen Whitmer.

=== EEOC v. R.G. & G.R. Harris Funeral Homes ===
On March 7, 2018, the United States Court of Appeals for the Sixth Circuit (covering Kentucky, Michigan, Ohio and Tennessee) ruled that Title VII of the Civil Rights Act of 1964 prohibits employment discrimination against transgender people under the category of sex. It also ruled that employers may not use the Religious Freedom Restoration Act to justify discrimination against LGBTQ people. Aimee Stephens, a transgender woman, began working for a funeral home and presented as male. In 2013, she told her boss that she was transgender and planned to transition. She was promptly fired by her boss who said that "gender transition violat[es] God's commands because a person's sex is an immutable God-given gift." With this decision, discrimination in the workplace based on gender identity is now banned in Michigan.

=== Codification of ELCRA protections ===
In December 2020, a court ruling legally allowed businesses within Michigan to discriminate against LGB individuals. Michigan Attorney General Dana Nessel appealed the court's ruling. In July 2022, the Michigan Supreme Court sided with AG Nessel and affirmed that Michigan's Elliott-Larsen Civil Rights Act (ELCRA) prohibits discrimination on the basis of an individual's sexual orientation. In March 2023, after Democrats won a trifecta in Michigan, Governor Gretchen Whitmer signed legislation to ensure the high court's ruling could not be overturned, explicitly banning discrimination on the bases of sexual orientation, or gender identity or expression.

== Hate crime law ==
Since 2009, US-wide federal law explicitly includes sexual orientation and gender identity, under the Obama-era "Matthew Shepard and James Byrd Jr. Hate Crimes Prevention Act" (imbedded within the National Defense Authorization Act for Fiscal Year 2010 legislation fully implemented).

Since 1992, sexual orientation has been recognized for data collection about hate crimes in Michigan.

In August 2021, a court in Michigan declared that gender identity is implicitly included within the 1992 hate crime laws of Michigan - under the “gender” interpretation.

In June 2023, the Michigan House of Representatives passed hate crime bills package - that explicitly includes and updates both "sexual orientation and gender identity or expression". The Michigan Senate passed hate crime bills package in December 2024 without amendment - immediately after the news reports of a Michigan man who “plotted and threatened the murder of gay men”. The Governor of Michigan in January 2025, signed the hate crime bills package into law, with the law going into effect 90 days after signature.

=== Abolishing the gay and trans panic defence ===
In July 2024, a bill that turned into a law was passed, signed and implemented by the state legislature and Governor - to officially abolish the “gay and trans panic defence“ within Michigan.

== Conversion therapy ==
In June 2019, Huntington Woods City Commission passed an ordinance, in a unanimous 5–0 vote, banning conversion therapy in a first reading. A year later in July 2020, the Madison Heights City Council unanimously approved the amendment to the city's ordinance on minors upon its second reading, effectively prohibiting the practice within the city. Conversion therapy in the community is ineffective, causes suicide and is even traumatizing for LGBT individuals. In August 2020, the Michigan City of Royal Oak also passed an ordinance that banned conversion therapy on minors - explicitly with up to 90 days jail or imprisonment and a $500 fine.

=== Michigan executive order ===
In June 2021, the Governor of Michigan Gretchen Whitmer signed an executive order that bans statewide taxpayers dollars or funding going towards conversion therapy on minors. Some cities and counties of Michigan already legally ban conversion therapy by local ordinances.

=== Michigan legislation ===
In June 2023, both houses of the Michigan Legislature passed a bill to formally implement a ban on conversion therapy practices permanently. The Governor of Michigan officially signed the bill into law in July 2023.

== Gender identity and expression ==
=== Birth certificates ===
On June 30, 2021, a 1978 law and policy within Michigan requiring sexual reassignment surgery - to change sex on an individual's birth certificate was formally declared unconstitutional by the courts. Individuals since June 30, 2021 can formally change sex without sexual reassignment surgery - similar to an individual changing sex on a drivers licence. The Michigan Department of Health and Human Services Director Elizabeth Hertel asked the attorney general in February to examine the constitutionality of the 1978 law that requires a written statement from a physician confirming that "gender-confirmation surgery" has been completed.

In December 2024, the Michigan Legislature passed a bill that both certified and codified the change of sex on a birth certificate without surgery by legislation.

=== Driver's licenses ===
In November 2019, Michigan implemented a new government software system to change an individual's gender or sex on drivers licenses and I.D.s within the state - by both a signed statutory declaration and a fee. In January 2020, plans were announced to begin offering an "X" marker on driver licenses at an unspecified future date. In November 2021, the Secretary of State said the option would be available "soon".

=== Respecting individual's pronouns ===
In September 2023, the Michigan Supreme Court announced a case decision on "respecting an individual's pronouns" for judges.

=== Sports ===
The Michigan High School Athletic Association (MHSAA) has cited “potential conflicts between [an] executive order and Michigan’s Elliott-Larsen Civil Rights Act,” which prohibits discrimination based on gender identity. In March 2025 the Michigan House of Representatives adopted a bipartisan resolution urging the MHSAA to ban transgender athletes from participating in girls’ and women’s sports.

== Public opinion ==
A 2022 Public Religion Research Institute poll found that 68% of Michigan residents supported same-sex marriage, while 30% were opposed and 2% were unsure. Additionally, 78% supported an anti-discrimination law covering sexual orientation and gender identity. 19% were opposed. 3% were undecided. The PRRI also found that 66% were against allowing public businesses to refuse to serve LGBTQ people due to religious beliefs, while 31% supported such religiously based refusals. 3% were undecided.

== Summary table ==
Same-sex sexual activity legal	Yes (Since 2003 - nationwide; statutory repeal pending)
Equal age of consent (16)	Yes (Since 2003 - nationwide)
Anti-discrimination laws in all areas	Yes (Both sexual orientation and gender identity since 2019; re-affirmed by a ruling from the Michigan Supreme Court in 2022 and then formally codified and protected by legislation in 2023)
Same-sex marriages	Yes (Since 2015)
Joint and stepchild adoption by same-sex couples	Yes / No (In September 2019, a judge within Michigan allowed discrimination against LGBT individuals adopting children within adoption agencies, on the technical legal grounds of "fundamental religious beliefs and freedoms". As with all court cases they are subject to appeal in the future)
Lesbians, gays and bisexuals allowed to serve openly in the military	Yes (Since 2011)
Transgender people allowed to serve openly in the military	No (Since 2025)
Intersex people allowed to serve openly in the military	/ Yes (Current DoD policy bans "Hermaphrodites" from serving or enlisting in the military)
Right to change legal gender on a birth certificate without surgery	Yes (Since 2021)
Access to IVF for lesbians	Yes
Automatic parenthood on birth certificates for children of same-sex couples	Yes
Abolition or repeal of the archaic gay and trans panic defense	Yes
Conversion therapy banned on minors	Yes (Since 2023)
Third gender or X option on government documents - such as drivers licences, I.D.s and birth certificates	Yes (Since 2021)
LGBT anti-bullying law in schools and colleges	No
LGBT-inclusive history education required to be taught in schools	No
LGBT-inclusive sex education required to be taught in schools	No
Inclusive surrogacy legislation	Yes (Since 2024)
MSMs allowed to donate blood	Yes (Since 2023 - federal policy)
Hate Crime Laws explicitly includes both sexual orientation and gender identity or expression federally and within Michigan	Yes (Since 2009 federally; Effective from April 2025 within Michigan, 90 days after Governor signature)

== See also ==
- Politics of Michigan
- LGBT history in Michigan
- LGBT rights in the United States
- Rights and responsibilities of marriages in the United States
- Law of Michigan
