= WADK =

Radio station in Newport, Rhode Island

- Newport, Rhode Island; United States
- Frequency: 1540 kHz
- Branding: 1540 WADK

Programming
- Format: Business news/talk, jazz on the weekend
- Affiliations: ABC News Radio

Ownership
- Owner: 3G Broadcasting, Inc.
- Sister stations: WMNP

History
- First air date: November 6, 1948
- Former call signs: WRJM (1948–1953)
- Call sign meaning: "Aquidneck"

Technical information
- Licensing authority: FCC
- Facility ID: 48744
- Class: D
- Power: 1,000 watts (daytime only)
- Transmitter coordinates: 41°30′13.37″N 71°18′41.18″W
- Translator: 101.1 W266DI (Newport)

Links
- Public license information: Public file; LMS
- Webcast: Listen live
- Website: wadk.com

WADK (1540 AM) is a radio station licensed to serve Newport, Rhode Island owned by 3G Broadcasting, Inc. It airs a business news/talk radio format, with jazz airing each weekend.

The station, the first to be built on Aquidneck Island, signed on the air in 1948 and has used the callsign WADK since November 23, 1953. Its broadcast tower has been located off Garfield Street in Newport since 1967.

== History ==
On December 2, 1947, John E. and Irene "Reeny" A. Malloy, doing business as Voice of Little Rhody, filed for a construction permit to build a new radio station on 1540 kHz at Newport, which was granted by the Federal Communications Commission on August 4, 1948. The station began broadcasting on November 6, 1948, as WRJM, for "Reeny and John Malloy". The Malloys would not own their new radio station for long, citing a lack of financial resources. In April 1949, they reached a deal to sell WRJM to the Aquidneck Broadcasting Corporation, a subsidiary of the locally based National Recording Corporation, which developed tape recording equipment. That deal never came to fruition, and a deal was instead struck to sell WRJM to the Aquidneck Broadcasting Corporation, headed by Columbus O'Donnell. The original studios at 204 Thames Street in Newport became the key element in a multi-year libel case against WRJM. In February 1950, the station put a display up in its window about a controversial seawall project, charging that the developers did not comply with their original proposal. The developers sued the station for libel and lost two years later. The O'Donnell group also relocated WADK from its original transmitter location near a charity farm to a new site on Reservoir Road that housed the studios and transmitter.

In late 1953, Milton E. Mitler acquired the Aquidneck Broadcasting Corporation; the callsign was immediately changed to WADK, representing Aquidneck Island. During Mitler's ownership, the station broadcast its first talk program, hosted by pub owner 'Sully' Sullivan, after Sullivan noted to the owner that "the great pastime of Rhode Island ... is talking politics". Mitler owned WADK until 1960, a year after he started another station near West Warwick. At that time, the Newport outlet was sold to two men from Washington, D.C., Arnold S. Lerner and Myer Feldman, doing business as Key Stations.

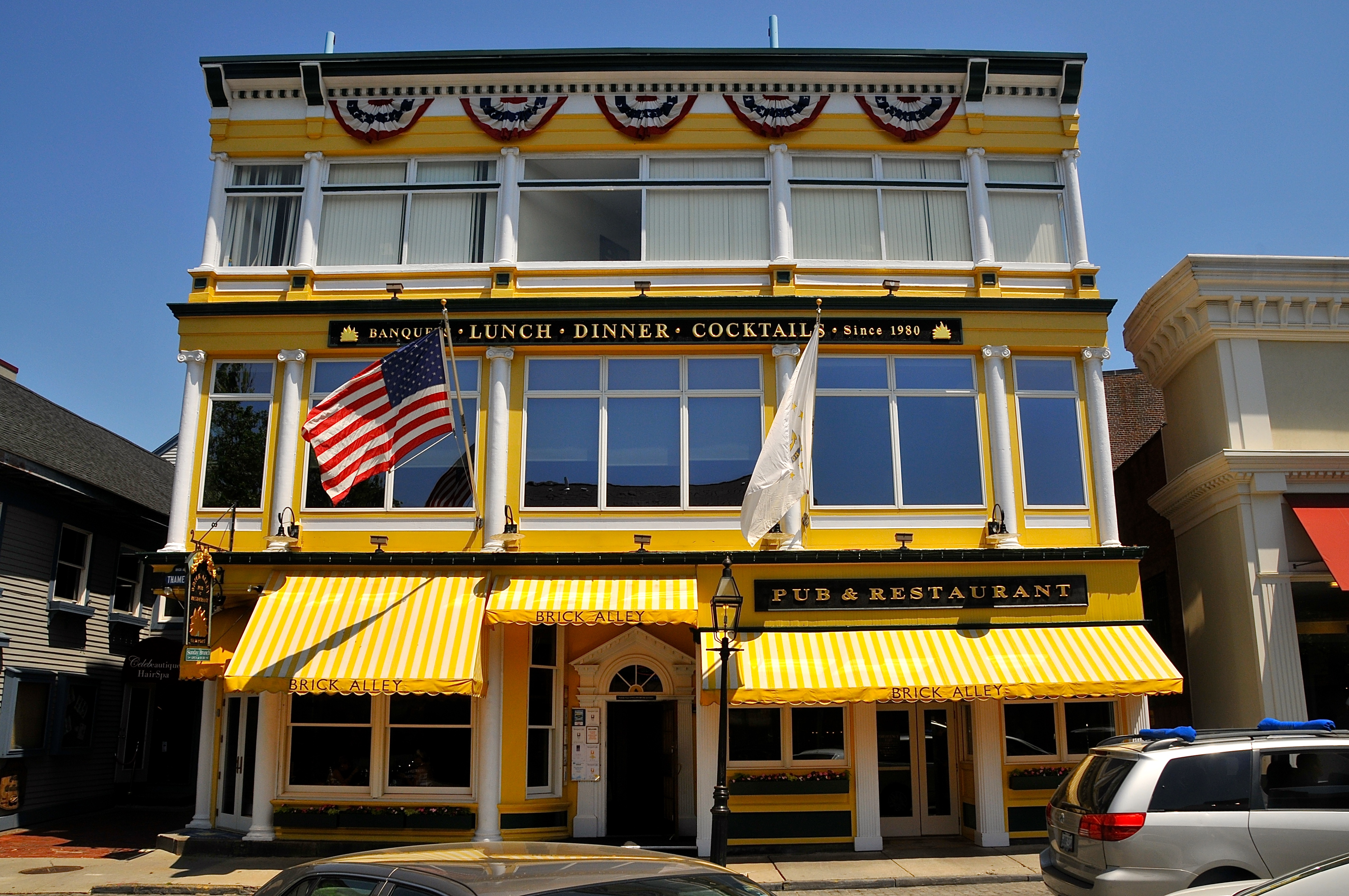
140 Thames Street housed WADK's studio facility beginning in 1973

The Reservoir Road transmitter site was shut down in 1967 and a new facility built on Garfield Avenue, though the studios remained. This would come to an end after the Middletown water department refused to grant a long-term lease to WADK in 1971, a lease that the station thought necessary if it wanted to make a major investment in the 20-year-old facility. A new site on Thames Street, a block from the original studios, was completed in 1973.

A daytime-only station its entire history, WADK filed in 1976 to increase its power to 2,500 watts and go full-time. It was the opening salvo in what would turn out to be a recurring fight amidst major changes in the Aquidneck broadcasting landscape. By the time that Key Stations had filed the petition to become a full-time station, Bay Broadcasters was years into the fight to put WOTB (107.1 FM) on the air. With 24-hour FM competition on the horizon, Key Stations owner Arnold Lerner opted to sell the AM station. The new owner, Newport Communications, was headed by Paramount Pictures vice president Peter Kuyper.

The full-service station continued with its format, which also included a live radio variety show hosted by Saucy Sylvia. Spectrum Communications of Boulder, Colorado, purchased WADK in 1983, largely acting as an absentee owner; two years later, after one of Spectrum's shareholders decided to sell, it was acquired by Connecticut-based Perry Communications, which hoped to be more aggressive in the station's attempts to go full-time. A year later, Perry purchased WOTB—giving it control of both of the commercial stations on Aquidneck Island—and announced plans to expand its coverage area. During this time period, WADK dropped its afternoon music programming and, with it, much of its high school sports coverage.

Urso Broadcasting of Westerly purchased WADK and WOTB in 1996, and an immediate format change was made on the FM, which dropped jazz programming after more than a decade and flipped to alternative rock; at the same time, weekend jazz programming was added to WADK's schedule. The FM station was sold off a year later to Citadel Communications, but Urso retained WADK until Astro Tele-Communications purchased it and WERI-FM 99.3 for $1.8 million in 1999.

WADK and the FM station, known at the time as WJZS, were sold to 3G Broadcasting, owner of two Florida stations, in 2013. Kurt Jackson's Island Broadcasting of RI agreed to purchase WADK and the FM station, now WMNP, in 2024.

== Translator ==
Call sign	Frequency	City of license	FID	ERP (W)	Class	Transmitter coordinates	FCC info
W266DI	101.1 FM	Newport, Rhode Island	200512	250	D	41°30′13.4″N 71°18′43.2″W	LMS
