= WMNP =

- Block Island, Rhode Island; United States
- Broadcast area: Newport, Rhode Island
- Frequency: 99.3 MHz
- Branding: Mixx 99.3

Programming
- Language: English
- Format: Contemporary hit radio

Ownership
- Owner: 3G Broadcasting, Inc.
- Sister stations: WADK

History
- First air date: 1988
- Former call signs: WITQ (1984–1988); WBLQ (1988–1996); WERI-FM (1996–1999); WADK-FM (1999–2004); WJZS (2004–2013)

Technical information
- Licensing authority: FCC
- Facility ID: 71295
- Class: A
- ERP: 6,000 watts
- HAAT: 78 meters (256 ft)
- Transmitter coordinates: 41°10′28.4″N 71°34′18.2″W

Links
- Public license information: Public file; LMS
- Webcast: Listen live
- Website: mixx993.com

WMNP (99.3 FM, "Mixx 99.3") is an American radio station licensed to serve the community of Block Island, Rhode Island. The station is owned by 3G Broadcasting, Inc, and broadcasts a contemporary hit radio music format. Its studio is located in Newport, Rhode Island.

== History ==
Established in 1984 as WITQ, it officially signed on in October 1988 as WBLQ. The format was automated adult contemporary until the early 1990s when the station shifted its programming to an eclectic album rock format. In 1996 the station was sold to Bear Broadcasting and the call sign changed to WERI-FM. The operation was moved to Newport in 1999 when Astro Tele-Communications rebranded the station as Swing FM running a swing music, jazz and adult standards format as WJZS. The format shifted to adult contemporary again as 99.3 The Bridge, then rebranded as Variety 99.3. In April 2013 3G Broadcasting Inc. purchased WJZS and WADK.

On May 3, 2013, under the new ownership of 3G Broadcasting with program director Matt Girard, WJZS changed formats to a contemporary hit radio/Top 40 format, branded as "Mixx 99.3" along with a new call sign: WMNP. Kurt Jackson's Island Broadcasting of RI agreed to purchase WMNP and WADK from 3G Broadcasting in 2024.
