= David M. Lawson =

American judge (born 1951)

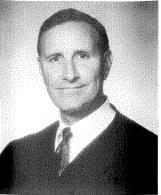

Senior Judge of the United States District Court for the Eastern District of Michigan
- Incumbent
- Assumed office August 6, 2021

Judge of the United States District Court for the Eastern District of Michigan
- In office June 2, 2000 – August 6, 2021
- Appointed by: Bill Clinton
- Preceded by: Avern Cohn
- Succeeded by: F. Kay Behm

Personal details
- Born: January 11, 1951 (age 75) Detroit, Michigan, U.S.
- Education: University of Notre Dame (BA); Wayne State University (JD)

David Michael Lawson (born January 11, 1951) is a senior United States district judge of the United States District Court for the Eastern District of Michigan.

== Education and career ==
Born in Detroit, Michigan, Lawson graduated from Brother Rice High School in 1969. He received a Bachelor of Arts degree in English from the University of Notre Dame in 1973 and a Juris Doctor from Wayne State University Law School in 1976. He was a law clerk for Justice James L. Ryan, Michigan Supreme Court from 1976 to 1977. He was in private practice from 1977 to 2000. While in private practice he worked for the law firms Lawson and Lawson, Liza Mulcahy, and Hill Lewis (which later merged and became the firm Clark Hill). During that time he also served as a Special Assistant Attorney General and Special Prosecutor for the Oakland County One-Man Grand Jury from 1978 to 1980 and as a Special Prosecuting Attorney for Livingston County from 1991 to 1993.

== Federal judicial service ==
On August 5, 1999, Lawson was nominated by President Bill Clinton to a seat on the United States District Court for the Eastern District of Michigan vacated by Avern Cohn. Lawson was confirmed by the United States Senate on May 24, 2000, and received his commission on June 2, 2000. From 2000 until 2006 Judge Lawson sat in Bay City as the sole judge in the Northern Division of the Eastern District of Michigan. In October 2006 Lawson moved to the Southern Division into a courtroom recently vacated by Judge Gerald Ellis Rosen. Judge Thomas Lamson Ludington then moved into Judge Lawson's courtroom in Bay City. Lawson assumed senior status on August 6, 2021.

Legal offices
Preceded by Avern Cohn	Judge of the United States District Court for the Eastern District of Michigan; 2000–2021	Succeeded by F. Kay Behm
