= David Bohnett Foundation =

American non-profit foundation

- Founded: 1999
- Founder: David Bohnett
- Type: Private foundation
- Tax ID no.: 95-4735846
- Purpose: Los Angeles initiatives, LGBTQ rights, leadership initiatives and voter education, gun violence prevention, animal language research
- Location: Beverly Hills, California, United States
- Region served: United States
- Method: Grantmaking
- Owner: David Bohnett
- Key people: David Bohnett, founder and president Michael Fleming, executive director
- Revenue: $7,974,208 (2024)
- Disbursements: More than $138 million
- Expenses: $8,166,250 (2024)
- Website: bohnettfoundation.org

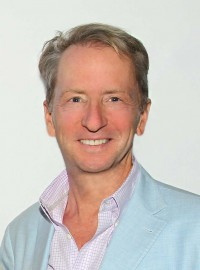
Foundation founder and technology entrepreneur, David Bohnett

The David Bohnett Foundation is an American foundation that gives grants to organizations that focus on primarily Los Angeles area programs and LGBT rights in the United States, as well as leadership initiatives and voter education, gun violence prevention, and animal language research. It was founded by David Bohnett in 1999.

== History ==
Immediately after selling his internet social-network company GeoCities to Yahoo! in 1999, David Bohnett turned his attention to activism. He created the David Bohnett Foundation, "a nonprofit grant-making organization focused on providing resources for organizations pursuing societal change and social justice through activism", with an initial endowment of $32 million. According to the Los Angeles Times Magazine, he "invests where he can actually improve lives, empower individuals and build viable communities in meaningful ways". To serve as the founding executive director and strategist for the foundation, he hired Michael Fleming, a former media leader for the American Civil Liberties Union. Fleming later became president of the foundation, while Paul Moore serves as executive director.

In 2000, the foundation's first full year, it donated $2 million to LGBT organizations, AIDS services, gun control programs, and voter registration initiatives. Bohnett's initial grants included large donations to GLAAD, the Family Equality Council, and the Human Rights Campaign. A prime aim for Bohnett is to "create an environment which destigmatizes homosexuality", and to that end he has funded both national gay rights organizations and also local LGBT organizations and centers across the U.S. The nationwide LGBT centers he has funded and created include numerous LGBT CyberCenters – safe-haven internet cafes where LGBT young people and seniors, and disadvantaged, troubled, or closeted gays, can find support and resources, including computers and internet access. Bohnett created the first CyberCenter in 1998, and as of 2021 there are 58 David Bohnett CyberCenters in the U.S.

In 2025, the foundation marked its 25th anniversary and published an anniversary report, For 25 Years, describing relationship-building, trust, and long-term commitment as central to its approach to social change.

== Organization ==
The David Bohnett Foundation provides grants to outside nonprofit organizations and projects supporting several primary funding areas: The Fund for Los Angeles, supporting a broad spectrum of arts, educational and civic programs; LGBTQ-related causes; graduate school leadership programs at the University of Michigan, New York University and Harvard University; voting rights and registration initiatives; supporting research and public policies to reduce the impact of firearm violence; leadership training initiatives for political public service; and animal research and rights.

As of 2025, the foundation had donated $138 million to nonprofit organizations and initiatives.

== Fund for Los Angeles ==
The David Bohnett Foundation Fund for Los Angeles provides support to local organizations that are working to better the civic and cultural lives of people living in Los Angeles. These grants are made under the initiative of either David Bohnett or the David Bohnett Foundation. As of 2025, the foundation had disbursed over $78,000,000 to recipients of funding from the Fund for Los Angeles.

=== Fund for Los Angeles grant recipients ===
Fund for Los Angeles grant recipients include:

- Aaron Diamond AIDS Research Center
- AIDS Project Los Angeles
- AIDS Walks
- American Jewish Committee
- amfAR
- Bet Tzedek Legal Services – The House of Justice
- Bicycle Kitchen
- Cable Positive
- Cedars-Sinai Medical Center
- CicLAvia
- Colburn School
- Conservation International
- Cornerstone Theater Company
- Electronic Frontier Foundation
- Environmental Media Association
- Geffen Playhouse
- Getty House Foundation
- Grand Performances
- Green Dot Public Schools
- Hale House
- Harmony Project
- Huntington Library
- John F. Kennedy Center for the Performing Arts
- KCRW
- Los Angeles Conservancy
- Los Angeles County Museum of Art
- Los Angeles County Public Library Foundation
- Los Angeles Gay and Lesbian Center
- Los Angeles Master Chorale
- Los Angeles Opera
- Making Opportunities for Upgrading Schools and Education
- The Mr. Holland's Opus Foundation
- Museum of Neon Art
- Museum of Science and Industry
- Music Center of Los Angeles County
- National Association for the Advancement of Colored People
- Project Angel Food
- Rancho Los Alamitos
- REDCAT
- San Francisco AIDS Foundation
- United States Artists
- University of California
- University of Southern California
- Urban Land Institute
- Venice Family Clinic

== LGBT community ==
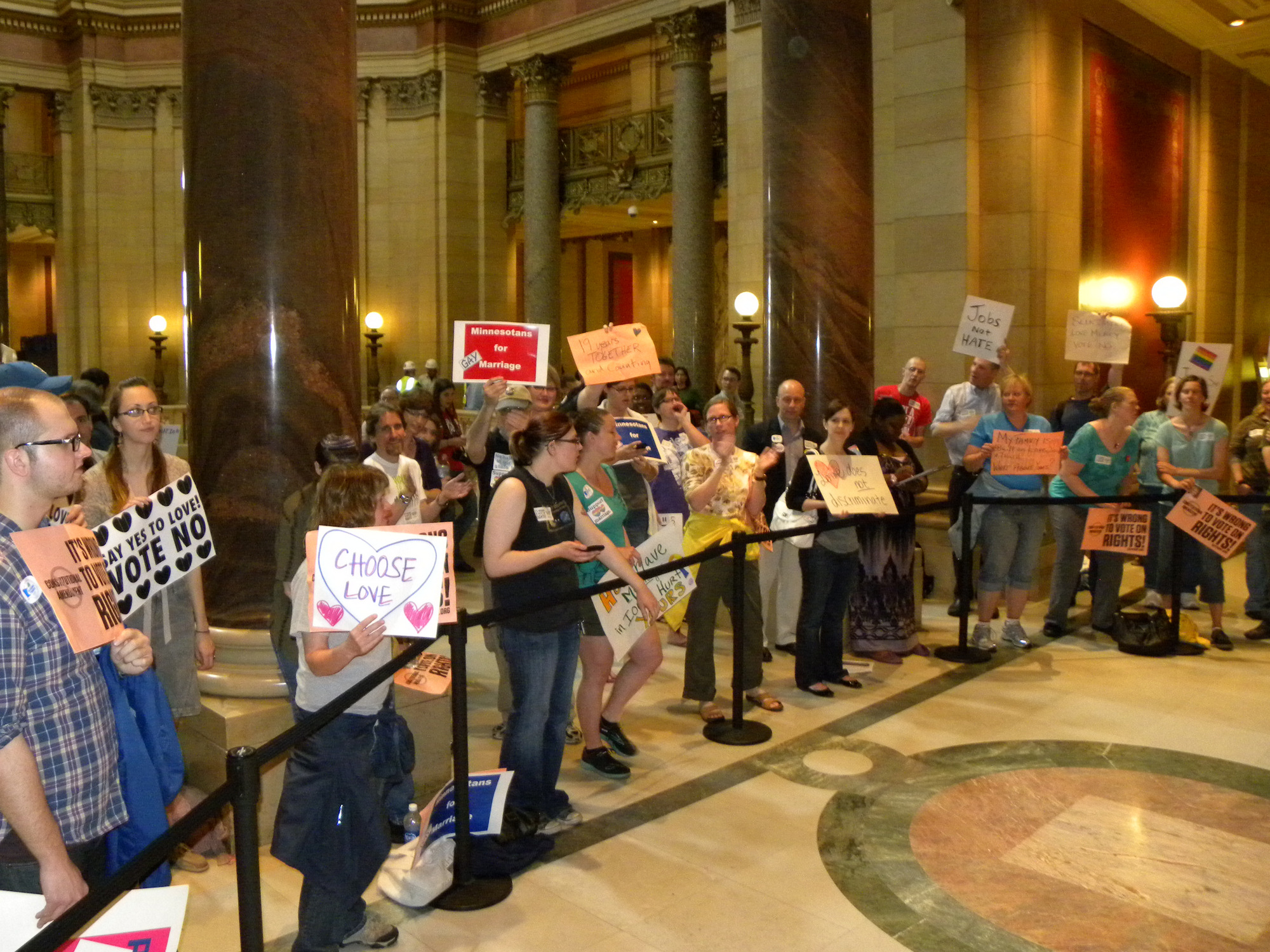
Protesters gathered inside the Minnesota capitol to protest against a vote to put an anti-gay marriage amendment on the 2012 election ballot

The David Bohnett Foundation supports organizations and projects using social activism to advance the rights of the lesbian, gay, bisexual and transgender (LGBTQ) community. The foundation also assists and promoted philanthropic organizations that foster positive portrayals of lesbians and gay men in the media. As of 2025, the foundation had disbursed over $28,000,000 to groups and organizations that strive to provide equal rights and protections for all LGBT people.

=== LGBT community grant recipients ===
LGBT community grant recipients include:

- Ali Forney Center
- American Fertility Association
- American Foundation for Equal Rights
- California Rural Legal Assistance
- The Cambridge School of Weston
- Campus Pride
- Celebration Theatre
- Center for American Progress
- CenterLink
- Children of Lesbians and Gays Everywhere
- Empire State Pride Agenda Foundation
- Equality California Institute
- Equality Federation Institute
- Family Equality Council
- Freedom to Marry
- GALAS LGBTQ+ Armenian Society
- Gay & Lesbian Advocates & Defenders
- Gay & Lesbian Leadership Institute
- Gay, Lesbian and Straight Education Network
- Gay Men's Chorus of Los Angeles
- Gibson House Museum
- GLAAD
- GSA Network
- Human Rights Campaign Foundation
- Immigration Equality
- In The Life Media
- International Federation of Black Prides
- International Gay and Lesbian Human Rights Commission
- KCET
- Lambda Legal Defense and Education Fund
- Lesbian, Gay, Bisexual & Transgender Community Center
- Liberty Hill Foundation
- Los Angeles Gay and Lesbian Center
- MassEquality
- Matthew Shepard Foundation
- Media Matters for America
- National Association for the Advancement of Colored People
- National Black Justice Coalition
- National Center for Lesbian Rights
- National Center for Transgender Equality
- National Gay and Lesbian Task Force
- National Lesbian and Gay Journalists Association
- One Iowa Education Fund
- ONE National Gay & Lesbian Archives
- Outfest
- People for the American Way Foundation
- PFLAG
- Point Foundation
- Pride Foundation
- Servicemembers Legal Defense Network
- Servicemembers United
- Services & Advocacy for GLBT Elders
- Soulforce
- Spectrum Center
- StoryCorps
- Transgender Law Center
- The Trevor Project
- Truth Wins Out
- WGBH Educational Foundation
- Williams Institute

=== CyberCenters ===
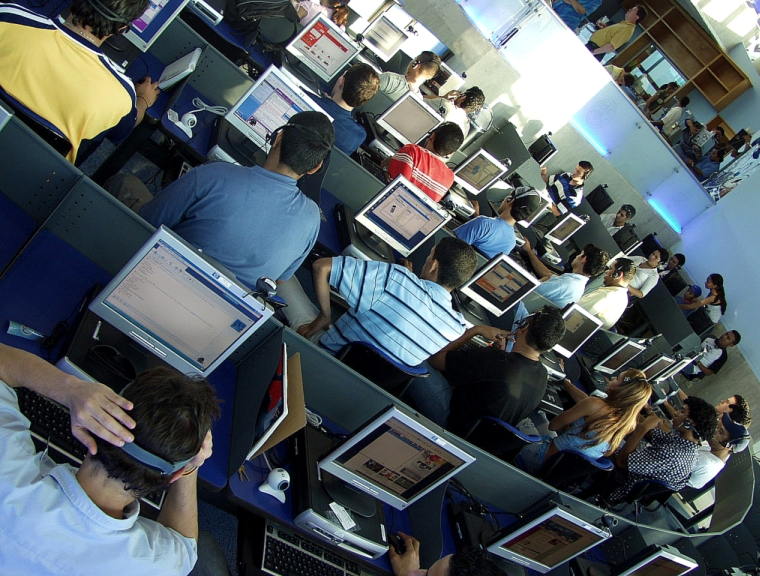
Example of a large CyberCenter setup

The David Bohnett Foundation has sponsored CyberCenters since 1998, with the first one established at the Los Angeles Gay and Lesbian Center. Now there are CyberCenters across the United States, in locations like Atlanta, Tulsa, Orlando, San Francisco and New York City. The David Bohnett CyberCenters are another major undertaking. Numbering 58 locations nationwide, they offer business, educational, research, and recreational opportunities to underserved LGBT communities via computer equipment and access to the Internet. As of 2025, the foundation had disbursed over $5,000,000 to recipients providing CyberCenters.

==== CyberCenter grant recipients ====
CyberCenter grant recipients include:

- Billy DeFrank Lesbian, Gay, Bisexual and Transgender Community Center
- Hudson Pride Connections
- Hudson Valley LGBTQ Community Center
- Lesbian, Gay, Bisexual & Transgender Community Center
- Los Angeles City College Foundation
- Los Angeles Gay and Lesbian Center
- Pride Center of Maryland
- RU12? Community Center
- Ruth Ellis Center
- San Francisco LGBT Community Center
- Services & Advocacy for GLBT Elders
- Spectrum Center
- Utah Pride Center

=== LGBT leadership ===
The foundation has been a major and long-term supporter of the Gay & Lesbian Victory Fund, especially its LGBT Leadership Fellows aimed at training LGBT leaders for state and local governments; as of 2020 the Bohnett Leaders Fellowship at the Victory Institute has sent over 150 LGBT leaders to the Harvard Kennedy School's Senior Executives in State and Local Government program since 2002. The David Bohnett LGBTQ Leaders Fellowship alumni include Kyrsten Sinema, the first openly bisexual U.S. congressperson, and Annise Parker, one of the first openly gay mayors of a major U.S. city (Houston).

== Leadership initiatives and voter education ==
The Bohnett foundation supports the development of the next generation of municipal leaders, through a variety of initiatives and grants. As of 2025, the foundation had disbursed over $13,723,000 to recipients and programs in its leadership initiatives.

=== Leadership initiatives ===
==== David Bohnett Foundation leadership programs ====
The foundation supports advances in public policy through David Bohnett Leadership Fellows programs at universities. It funds graduate-school civic internship and leadership programs at:

- Gerald R. Ford School of Public Policy at the University of Michigan
- John F. Kennedy School of Government at Harvard University
- Robert F. Wagner Graduate School of Public Service at New York University
- UCLA Luskin School of Public Affairs

In other grants, in Detroit, New York City, and Los Angeles, graduate students receive positions in the mayor's office, and the stipends and tuition of these David Bohnett fellows are paid for by the Bohnett Foundation. These paid student interns have been involved in policy analysis and implementation, assisting speech writing, evaluating department heads, reducing homelessness, and other initiatives. Several former Bohnett mayoral fellows occupy management positions in the cities where they had interned. In 2014, Stephanie Chang, a Bohnett fellow from the University of Michigan, became the first Asian-American woman elected to the Michigan state legislature.

==== David Bohnett Foundation Congressional interns ====
The foundation supports African American and Hispanic and Latino American student internships in the United States Congress. In partnership with the Congressional Black Caucus Foundation and the Congressional Hispanic Caucus Institute, summer internships offer students a private look into the United States' democratic process. In a series of educational opportunities within the United States Congress, students are encouraged to explore diversity through civic engagement, and build coalitions based on shared values, purpose and goals.

=== Voter education ===
The David Bohnett Foundation supports safe and secure elections, both during the voting process and after. They provide funding to projects that work to ensure fair elections, protect voting rights, and raise the level of political discourse among all Americans, regardless of age, gender identity, political party or other diversities. The foundation supports projects working at local, state and national levels on a wide range of voter registration initiatives, from preventing polling-place irregularities to research that helps assess obstacles that keep certain populations from having their votes counted. As of 2014, the foundation had disbursed over $4,500,000 exclusively to recipients working on voter education.

==== Voter education grant recipients ====
Voter education grant recipients include:

- Center for the Study of Political Graphics
- Congressional Black Caucus Foundation
- Congressional Hispanic Caucus Institute
- Edward M. Kennedy Institute for the United States Senate
- Electronic Frontier Foundation
- Equality California Institute
- Equality Federation Institute
- Gay & Lesbian Leadership Institute
- Human Rights Campaign Foundation
- Liberty Hill Foundation
- Marriage Equality California
- Millennium March on Washington
- People For the American Way
- Project Vote
- Public Knowledge
- Rock the Vote
- Servicemembers Legal Defense Network
- Vital Voices

== Gun violence prevention ==
The David Bohnett Foundation works with public policy makers, advocates and activists to reduce gun violence and promote gun violence prevention policies. Funding is provided to groups and institutions that educate and advocate on the effects of guns and solutions to reduce gun violence. As of 2025, the foundation has disbursed over $6,081,000 to recipients working on gun violence prevention.

=== Gun violence prevention grant recipients ===
Gun violence prevention grant recipients include:

- Alliance for Justice
- Amnesty International USA
- Association of Prosecuting Attorneys
- Brady Center to Prevent Gun Violence
- Center for American Progress
- The Center to Prevent Youth Violence
- Harvard Injury Control Research Center
- Educational Fund to Stop Gun Violence
- Law Center to Prevent Gun Violence
- Mayors Against Illegal Guns
- Media Matters for America
- Million Mom March
- UCLA Luskin School of Public Affairs
- Violence Policy Center
- Washington Office on Latin America

== Animal language research ==
The David Bohnett Foundation supports animal language research, funding of service animals and eliminating the trade of endangered species. As of 2025, the foundation has disbursed over $2,177,000 to recipients working on animal language research.

=== Animal language research grant recipients ===
Animal language research grant recipients include:

- American Society for the Prevention of Cruelty to Animals
- Center for Great Apes
- Environmental Investigation Agency
- The Gorilla Foundation
- Jane Goodall Institute
- Lincoln Park Zoo
- National Zoological Park
- Save the Chimps
- Wildlife Alliance

== See also ==
- Arcus Foundation
- Gill Foundation
