= List of LGBTQ community centers in the United States =

LGBTQ community centers are safe meeting places for all people. Prior to the gay liberation movement, there were no LGBTQ community centers in the United States. They became popular in the 1980s following activism to combat HIV/AIDS in the LGBTQ community. By 2009, there were at least 150 throughout the country.

== Arkansas ==
- Little Rock — Center for Artistic Revolution

== California ==
- Berkeley — Pacific Center for Human Growth
- Los Angeles — Los Angeles LGBT Center
- San Diego — The San Diego LGBT Community Center
- Oakland — Oakland LGBTQ Community Center
- San Francisco — SF LGBT Center
- San Francisco — Trans: Thrive
- San Francisco — Queer Cultural Center
- San Jose — Billy DeFrank Lesbian, Gay, Bisexual and Transgender Community Center
- Orange County LGBT Center

== Colorado ==
- Colorado Springs — Prism Community Collective

== Connecticut ==
- New Haven — New Haven Pride Center

== Florida ==
- Fort Lauderdale — The Pride Center at Equality Park
- Jacksonville — The Queer Trans Project

== Georgia ==
- Atlanta — Atlanta Gay Center (now closed)
- Atlanta — Lost-n-Found Youth
- Savannah — Savannah Pride Center

== Illinois ==
- Chicago — Center on Halsted

== Indiana ==
- Indianapolis — IYG

== Maryland ==
- Baltimore — Pride Center of Maryland

== Massachusetts ==
- Boston — BAGLY

== Michigan ==
- Ann Arbor — University of Michigan Spectrum Center
- Detroit — LGBT Detroit
- Detroit — Ruth Ellis Center
- Ferndale — Affirmations

== Minnesota ==
- Minneapolis — Quatrefoil Library
- Minneapolis — Queer Student Cultural Center

== Missouri ==
- Springfield- The GLO Center

== Nevada ==
- Las Vegas — The Gay and Lesbian Community Center of Southern Nevada

== New Jersey ==
- Jersey City — Hudson Pride Center
- Highland Park — Pride Center of New Jersey

== New Mexico ==
- Albuquerque — MPower

== New York ==
- Albany — Pride Center of the Capital Region
- Kingston/Hudson Valley — Hudson Valley LGBTQ Community Center
- New York City — Ali Forney Center
- New York City — Brooklyn Community Pride Center
- New York City — Callen-Lorde Community Health Center
- New York City — Lesbian, Gay, Bisexual & Transgender Community Center
- New York City — Women's Liberation Center

== North Carolina ==
- Boone - Henderson Springs LGBT Center
- Chapel Hill - UNC-Chapel Hill LGBTQ Center
- Charlotte - Time Out Youth
- Durham - LGBTQ Center Durham
- Greensboro - Guilford Green Foundation & LGBTQ Center
- Greenville - Dr. Jesse R. Peel LGBTQ Center
- Jacksonville - Onslow County LGBTQ+ Community Center
- New Bern - New Bern Pride
- Raleigh - LGBT Center of Raleigh
- Wilmington - LGBTQ Center of the Cape Fear Coast
- Winston-Salem - North Star LGBTQ+ Community Center

== Ohio ==
- Cleveland - LGBT Community Center of Greater Cleveland
- Columbus — Stonewall Columbus
- Dayton - Greater Dayton LGBT Center

== Oklahoma ==
- Tulsa — Oklahomans for Equality

== Oregon ==
- Portland — Q Center

== Pennsylvania ==
- Allentown — Bradbury-Sullivan LGBT Community Center
- Philadelphia — Mazzoni Center
- Philadelphia — William Way LGBT Community Center

== Texas ==
- Houston — Montrose Center

== Utah ==
- Salt Lake City — Utah Pride Center

== Vermont ==
- Burlington — Pride Center of Vermont

== Virginia ==
- Harrisonburg - Friendly City Safe Space
- Norfolk - The LGBT Life Center
- Staunton - Shenandoah LGBTQ Center

== Washington State ==
- Seattle - GenPride at Pride Place

== Wisconsin ==
- Milwaukee — Project Q

== See also ==
- List of LGBTQ-related organizations and conferences
