= Rescue Mission Syracuse =

- Formation: established 1887, 137 years ago
- Founder: H. B. Gibbud
- Type: private nonprofit
- Tax ID no.: 15-0532146
- Legal status: 501(c)(3)
- Headquarters: 155 Gifford St, Syracuse, NY 13202
- Location: United States
- Key people: Dan Sieburg, chief executive officer
- Website: www.rescuemissionalliance.org

Rescue Mission Syracuse is a private 501(c)(3) nonprofit organization established in 1887, based in Syracuse, New York. The mission statement for Rescue Mission is to "put love into action through shelter, food, clothing, and hope." It provides food services, emergency shelter, housing, permanent care, clothing centers, mobile outreach services, employment and educational resources, and connections to other services. It is currently located at 155 Gifford St in Syracuse, NY.

Rescue Mission Syracuse, 155 Gifford St, Syracuse, NY 13202

== History ==
In the early part of 1887, a lot of Christians in Syracuse were impacted by a wish to make some contributions to the cause of Christianity in the Syracuse community. The author of this article H. B. Gibbud who is a member of the Florence Night Mission of New York City was then invited to come to Syracuse for consultation on the matter. In June 1887, H. B. Gibbud arrived in Syracuse with his wife. After a careful study of the situation of Syracuse, H. B. Gibbud claimed that "the thing to do is create a place in the very midst of the district where information was most needed, a place to which the people would be constrained to come and in which they would be met by sympathetic hearts." This advice was acted upon. They select the place on East Railroad Street, No. 340, near Mulberry. Around it, there are drinking saloons, gambling dens, and houses of ill-fame within a stone's in every direction. On September 4, 1887, in this place, Rescue Mission Syracuse was established, and it began its work among the non-church-going masses. The name of it comes from the event "Jerry Rescue". H. B. Gibbud was placed in charge as superintendent, and Mr. John E. Hendscy was their assistant.

A prominent businessman of the city called H. B. Andrews purchased the building and site at 115 Mulberry Street near the Railroad. He altered, enlarged, and repaired the building and grounds and leased them to the Mission for a merely nominal rental, and on May 1, 1890, the Mission took possession of its new place.

In 1959, Clarence Jordan came to Syracuse from Goodwill in Bridgeport, Conn. He worked as manager of the Rescue Mission's small lodging house. In less than a year, Jordan was running the mission. Then, the organization had seven employees, one building, and a budget of $65,000. He has worked in Rescue Mission for 38 years.

In 2012, a Central New Yorker introduced Alan Thornton to the mission. Alan Thornton is a graduate of Pennsylvania's Messiah College. He soon becomes an executive director and CEO of the Rescue Mission in Syracuse. On November 17, 2017, Alan Thornton resigned from the mission to prepare for his role as president and CEO of St. John's Community Services in Washington, D.C. After that, Dan Sieburg became the new chief executive officer of the Rescue Mission Alliance. He is a social worker who has been with the Syracuse Mission for 10 years, mostly in program oversight jobs, on projects all over Central New York.

== Services ==
=== Food services ===
Clarence L. Jordan Food Service and Culinary Education Center was opened in 2019, located at 148 Gifford Street, Syracuse NY, and named for previous Rescue Mission director and board member Clarence L. Jordan, who died in 2018. The food center is dedicated to serving hot breakfast, lunch, and dinner every single day in Syracuse to anyone in need. Every day will provide over 700 meals to the public.

Clarence L. Jordan Food Service and Culinary Education Center not only serves hot meals but also have state-of-the-art kitchen hosts cooking classes and teaches kitchen training skills for people who are looking for work in the food service industry. According to Spectrum News, the center also "has an electric fireplace and a family dining room" provided to people.

=== Day center and emergency shelter ===
Both Alice C. Barber Day Center and Kiesewetter Emergency Shelter cater specifically to the needs of individuals facing crises, offering them a haven and a range of essential amenities. Within these facilities, people are provided with secure dormitories ensuring their safety and comfort during times of distress. In addition, they also offer support for employment, education, and healthcare services.

==== Alice C. Barber Day Center ====
Alice C. Barber Day Center is located at 122 Dickerson Street, Syracuse NY. The day center is the entry point to reach out to the services of Rescue Mission Syracuse, public bathrooms with a shower, meals, clothing, shelter, and HIS Van (Homeless Intervention Services Van) are provided. HIS Van is used to transport homeless individuals to medical, legal, and employment appointments if needed.

Inside the day center is an employment and education resource spot, to help clients get help with obtaining work and housing. Clients can also engage in the "Willing to Work" program to get unpaid job experience.

==== Kiesewetter Emergency Shelter ====
Kiesewetter Emergency Shelter is the largest emergency shelter around Syracuse and Onondaga County, with 192 beds and 8 dormitories, containing two dormitories exclusively for females. According to CNY's Healthcare, in 2017, the emergency shelter provided "more than 90,000 overnight stays."

=== Street outreach – Rescue Mission Homeless Intervention Services (HIS) ===
According to Paul Driscoll, commissioner of the Syracuse Department of Neighborhood and Business Development, "In Syracuse, there are typically 20 to 25 unsheltered homeless people during the summer and about five during the winter." Rescue Mission Homeless Intervention Services (HIS) Team is the only full-time mobile service that reaches out and keeps homeless individuals in the Syracuse area safe year-round. The outreach team will attempt to build trust and transport homeless individuals to the shelter. If individuals are not willing to get inside the shelter and choose to live outdoors, workers will provide hot meals, drinks, clothing, blankets, and other necessities to support them.

=== Long-term, permanent care – Crossroads Adult Home ===
Crossroads Adult Home is a congregate-care Level 3 facility located at 120 Gifford Street, Syracuse NY, which provides both long-term and transitional housing for males aged 25 and above with mental, physical, or developmental disabilities. The facility supports a total of 59-bed residences and provides assisted living services such as 24-hour supervision, basic care needs, medication management, and three meals and two snacks a day with special diet accommodations if there are medical concerns.

=== Community clothing center ===
The Community Clothing Center reopened in 2022, following a two-year shutdown during the peak of the epidemic. The Community Clothing Center is now located at 200 Gifford Street. The center provides people with free clothing, hygiene items, and other necessities. Every month, people can get up to five free clothing items including women's, men's, and children's clothing, and shoes through the center. The center also cooperates with the CNY Diaper Bank for the distribution station, providing free diapers for people who needed.

== Local contributions ==
=== LGBTQ youth homelessness ===
In 2014, When Dan Sieburg attended a conference about homelessness, he was surprised about the disproportionate number of homeless youth in the U.S. who identify as LGBTQ. He realizes that the local Rescue Mission doesn't have shelters that are specifically addressing LGBTQ youth homelessness. After that, Sieburg reached out to ACR Health, a fellow Syracuse nonprofit that provides support services for people with chronic illnesses, including HIV/AIDS, and operates the Q Center, a supportive space for LGBTQ youth where they and their families can gather, build community, and receive health and other support services. After years of conversations, Rescue Mission Syracuse and ACR Health plan to raise funds to open an emergency 10-bed shelter for runaway and homeless LGBTQ youth, ages 12 to 17 in 2019, providing them with access to Q Center programs, including family support groups, tutoring, and case management, among other services.

== Programs ==
=== Rescue Mission donation centers in Wegmans ===
The privately held American supermarket, Wegmans, hosted Rescue Mission donation centers in their parking lot for decades. In 2023, Wegmans decided to terminate its partnership with Rescue Mission. Donation Centers in Liverpool/John Glenn, East Syracuse, and Clay/ Great Northern have been closed and are expected to close three more in 2024 including Cicero/ Route 11, DeWitt, and Liverpool/ Taft Road locations.

=== Thrifty shopper ===
Thrifty Shopper is a retail store owned and operated by Rescue Mission Alliance Syracuse, that offers affordable clothing, household products, and furniture to customers. All revenue from Thrifty Shopper store sales will provide food, shelter, and clothing to people who needed.

Every Thrifty Shopper accepts clothing in any condition, as well as shoes, accessories, linens, books, and electronics & small appliances. The stores do not accept mattresses, bed pillows, cribs, sleep sofas, car seats, high chairs, and tires. The donations might be sold at either Thrifty Shopper or 3fifteen store. Alternatively, it might be donated to one of the agencies' clients or be recycled.

Rescue Mission Syracuse now has 19 Thrifty Shoppers and three 3fifteen stores around the Upstate New York area.

== Finances ==
Mission Rescue Alliance's financial reports show a good pattern of financial management and transparency. Key financial data such as revenues, expenses, net income, and net assets highlight the organization's ability to sustain services and increase resources over time. The majority of their revenue comes from donations (28.9%) and net inventory sales (65%), which together make up a significant portion of total revenue. These revenues are used to support a variety of expenditures, a significant portion of which is used to pay salaries and wages(47.7%) to ensure the delivery of programs and services. As revenues increase each year, so do expenditures.

== See also ==
- 501(c)(3) organization
- Homelessness among LGBT youth in the United States
