= Pride Center =

Pride Center or Pride Centre may refer to:

- Brooklyn Community Pride Center - A nonprofit LGBTQ+ community center in Brooklyn, New York
- LGBT community centre - Also called a "pride center"
- Pride Center of Maryland - A nonprofit organization serving the LGBT population of Baltimore
- The Pride Center at Equality Park - A nonprofit organization serving the LGBT population of South Florida
- The Pride Centre of Edmonton - An LGBT community centre in Edmonton
- Utah Pride Center - A nonprofit organization in Salt Lake City
- Pride Center of Vermont - A nonprofit LGBT+ organization in Vermont
