= LGBTQ culture in Tijuana =

LGBTQ community, history and nightlife of Tijuana, Mexico

LGBTQ culture in Tijuana, the Mexican border city across from San Diego, goes back at least to the 1920s, when gay men were part of the bar life of the red-light district. Tijuana had its own gay groups and magazines from the early 1980s. A police raid on gay bars on 30 November 1991 set off street protests and organized rights activism, and the first Pride march went down Avenida Revolución on 17 June 1995 with somewhere between 85 and 100 people. Today the march draws thousands. In 2018 the city had ten recognized gay bars, most of them downtown around Avenida Revolución and Plaza Santa Cecilia. Many bar customers and early Pride marchers came from San Diego, whose Imperial Court recognized Tijuana's drag court in 1983, and since 2018 LGBTQ asylum seekers have waited in Tijuana to cross into the US.

== History ==
=== Early years ===
Homosexual men were visible in Tijuana's zona de tolerancia (red-light district) from the 1920s. Tijuana's reputation as a vice town goes back to about 1911, when bans on gambling and saloons took effect north of the border; Prohibition from 1920 and visits by US Marines in the Second World War added to it. Into the 1970s men met in movie theaters, the Málaga bathhouse and Teniente Guerrero Park. The local press reported arrests of transformistas (female impersonators): in 1972 El Heraldo reported a detention at Cine Zaragoza in October, and an arrest for transformismo at Avenida Constitución and Calle Baja California in November. The bar Los Equipales was raided in 1976. Moralization campaigns against "sexual degeneration" went back to the 1930s, and in the 1970s and '80s newspapers tied mujercitos (a slur for effeminate men) and homosexuals to crime and disease.

=== Organizing in the 1980s ===
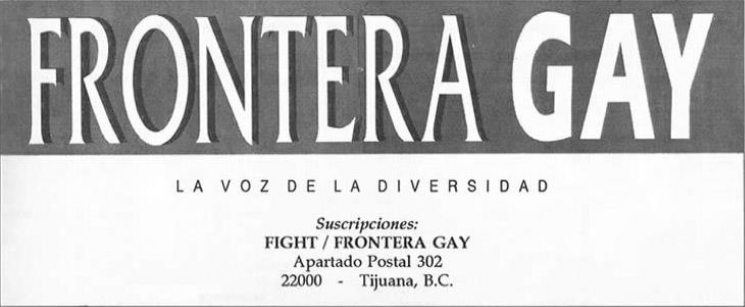
Masthead of Frontera Gay, published by FIGHT in Tijuana in the 1990s

The first gay group in Tijuana was FIGHT (Frente Internacional por las Garantías Humanas en Tijuana), founded in 1980 after some of its members went to the National Third World Lesbian and Gay Conference in Washington, D.C., in 1979. Anguiano calls Emilio Velásquez the founder of the city's gay movement. Its base was the second floor of Emilio's Café Cantante, which stayed open at least 25 years. In 1983 Alejandro García split from FIGHT and formed Grupo Liberalista, later Grupo ¿Y Qué? ("So What?"), which put out ¡Y Qué!, the first gay magazine in the city. It sold in Mexicali, at the Grass Roots Cultural Center in San Diego and at A Different Light bookstore in Los Angeles. Sources give different years for the group's founding. In June 1983 García and some 25 to 30 gay men marched through downtown and were pelted with eggs and insults.

AIDS reached Tijuana in 1983. In 1985 García founded the Proyecto SIDA Tijuana, and the first free AIDS clinics were set up with volunteers from San Diego. From the early 1990s FIGHT put out the magazine Frontera Gay, which carried news on AIDS. Max Mejía, who moved to Tijuana from San Francisco in 1990, was behind it and the magazine Arte de Vivir with Óscar Soto, and ran the city's first sexual diversity festivals in the 1990s; he died in 2015. The historian Jesse Anguiano ties the growth of the movement in part to the PAN's win in Baja California in 1989, the first time an opposition party won a Mexican governorship.

=== The 1991 raids ===
On the night of 30 November 1991 the state judicial police raided Plaza Santa Cecilia and gay bars downtown as part of "Operación Centro". Sources name El Ranchero and Los Equipales; Areli Veloz Contreras adds El Noa Noa. The activist Max Mejía put the number detained at 71; the weekly Zeta said more than 30. They were charged with faltas a la moral (offenses against public morals). The municipal secretary defended the raid as a fight against AIDS, and a police commander spoke of clearing mujercitos from downtown. A street confrontation with police followed and the story made the front pages. The Catholic Church denounced the gay community, while the Centro Binacional de Derechos Humanos and FIGHT defended the protesters; the mayor of San Diego contacted Tijuana officials because Americans were among those arrested. Activists filed a complaint with the state human rights office, formed a Comité de Defensa de la Comunidad de Ambiente in December, and threatened a tourist boycott with support from groups in San Diego and Los Angeles. María E. Curry of San Diego's Save Our Heritage Organisation calls the confrontation "the historic beginnings of the struggle for LGBTQ rights in the city".

Several killings of gay men and a trans woman followed in 1991 and 1992. The press called one "venganza entre degenerados" ("revenge among degenerates") and another a crimen pasional (crime of passion).

== Pride ==
A Tijuana Pride delegation at Mexico City Pride, 2012

There was no march in 1994, but a Semana Cultural Gay (gay cultural week) was held in September. On 17 June 1995 Grupo ¿Y Qué? held Tijuana's first Pride march, from Second Street and Avenida Constitución down Avenida Revolución. Rex Wockner counted 85 marchers; Sandra Dibble, who covered it for the San Diego Union-Tribune, recalls about 100. The gay bars boycotted it for fear of raids or license trouble. At the end of the march García said: "(Previously) we have gone to San Diego to taste freedom. Now we have tasted the freedom here."

About 300 people marched in 1996, with a police motorcycle escort; one spectator shouted anti-gay insults. In 1997 about 225 marched, half of them Americans, among them the San Diego Imperial Court and Long Beach Pride, while another 200 or so walked on the sidewalks out of sight of the TV cameras. A 10-piece mariachi band led the march, the lesbian activist Patria Jiménez was grand marshal, and the dance afterward was at Mike's. García and José Navarro had received six death threats by phone beforehand. In 1998 Jiménez, by then a federal deputy, called it "the second-most-important pride parade in the nation". In October 1999 the Latina/o LGBT organization LLEGO held its seventh Encuentro in San Diego and Tijuana. The seventh march, in June 2001, had about 275 people, 150 in the street and 125 on the sidewalk. It went down Second Street and Avenida Revolución at 4 p.m. on a Saturday, escorted by nine motorcycle police and a mariachi band. In 2003 about 300 marched, with a few thousand watching; two eggs and two tomatoes were thrown at transgender marchers, and the march ended at Los Equipales.

The 2005 march did not happen: the organizers did not show up, amid reports of conflict on the Pride committee. It came back in 2006 with about 400 people, after a year of disorganization that followed García's death. The 2009 march, the 14th, was the biggest yet, with at least 1,000 marchers along seven blocks of Avenida Revolución and more than 10,000 watching. Because of the drug-cartel violence that began in 2008, almost no one came from Southern California, and Wockner called it "a purely local and home-grown affair". Organizer Lorenzo Herrera called for a blank "pink vote" in that year's federal election, since no candidate had proposed laws on homophobia or human rights. In 2010 the march had a two-day street festival for the first time, with three stages near the Tijuana arch, co-sponsored by the city and state governments, the tourism committee, a merchants' association and a brewery. About 1,000 marched in 2011, many on the beds of semi-trucks, and drag queens performed afterward on an open-air stage in Plaza Santa Cecilia.

Since 2016 the march has started at Calle Primera and Avenida Mutualismo. In 2016 about 500 marched and protested recent hate crimes in Orlando (the Pulse nightclub shooting) and Xalapa. In 2018 more than 2,000 people marched with eight floats; Zeta counted ten recognized gay bars in the city, seven of which planned floats. In 2020 the march became a car caravan along Avenida Revolución. In 2021 Mayor Karla Ruiz MacFarland cut the ribbon and married two women, Ana Karen Cuevas and Jennifer Medel. The 2023 march, with migration as its theme, drew about 8,000. In 2025 Protección Civil estimated about 5,000, and Regina Orozco gave a free concert. The 2026 march, on 27 June, was billed as the 31st; Zeta reported about 4,000 people, while Protección Civil's first count was more than 12,000. Sources do not agree on how the editions are numbered.

== Nightlife ==
A 2022 study by Alberto Hernández Hernández says El Taurino is remembered as the city's first gay bar. Mike's, on Avenida Revolución, was founded by the Cuban expatriate Raúl "Socio" Crespo, and the original burned down in 1968. It went from a 1960s rock hall to a disco, a table-dance club and then a gay venue with travesti shows from the 1980s, and in 1997 Wockner called it "Tijuana's most popular gay disco". In 2003 Los Equipales, on Calle Séptima just east of Revolución, was "one of Tijuana's main gay discothèques". In 1992 the San Diego Reader called the Noa Noa, in the Zona Norte, "the heart of the Zona Norte's gay scene", with transsexual performers miming Mexican ballads.

Plaza Santa Cecilia, a pedestrian street off Avenida Revolución, opened on 22 November 1980, the feast of Saint Cecilia, the patron saint of musicians; mariachis play there around the clock. It became the main gay meeting place downtown, with bars like El Ranchero, Hawaii and Villa García. Wockner called it "the city's gayest block" in 2011. In 1998 the "gay plaza" had three gay bars; after a wave of muggings that began when night patrols were withdrawn, activists got police to patrol it again from dusk until dawn. In 2001 Tijuana had eight gay bars that drew thousands of customers. A 2012 study listed El Camaleón, El Freedom, El Clóset, La Co, Mike's and Los Equipales on and near Revolución, and a Sanborns on Calle Octava as a cruising spot. A 2015 study counted 21 gay-friendly bars. There were also bathhouses (La Toalla, Vica), porn cinemas and bars with dark rooms.

Avenida Revolución lost much of its tourist trade in the 2000s: longer border waits after the September 11 attacks, the US passport requirement and the crime wave from 2008 all kept Americans away. In 2011 only three San Diego activists came to the US consul general's LGBT reception in Tijuana. In 2022 Punch wrote up El Ranchero, with drag lip-sync shows and a stripper pole upstairs, and newer bars like Bigou, Coyote and Rubik's. In 2023 bar owners, with backing from the city's diversity office, proposed a "Zona Rosa" (pink zone) of at least ten LGBTQ bars on Avenida Revolución between Calle Primera and Calle Segunda; officials compared it to San Diego's Hillcrest. The city ran a "Punto Arcoíris" (rainbow point) safety certification and trained more than 200 bar employees. The name "Zona Rosa" came from the bar owners and was disputed; the official in charge preferred "punto arcoíris".

In October 2024 Omar Guido Chávez, owner of the club Sodoma on Revolución, was found dismembered. The state prosecutor said there was no evidence of a hate crime and tied the killing to street-level drug dealing.

== Drag ==
The Casa Real-Imperial de Tijuana, a drag court, was founded on 20 October 1982, modeled on the Imperial Court System. A treaty with San Diego's Imperial Court recognized it on 4 June 1983, and its first coronation was on 17 September 1983 at Marko Disco, with the theme "Liberation is Independence". Later events were at Mi Kasa, Los Equipales and Mike's Disco. José Sarria, founder of the Imperial Court System, visited in May 1988. That same month the Tijuana court declared Nicole Ramírez Murray of San Diego persona non grata, and San Diego voided the treaty. The court split in 1990 over HIV/AIDS and left the International Court System in 2018. Its history was written by Martín H. González Romero from the José Sarria Papers at the GLBT Historical Society in San Francisco.

Travesti shows have been part of the bar scene since at least the 1980s, at Mike's, the Noa Noa and El Ranchero. Drag performers were also targets of the police: in 1998 a performer called "Veronica" was arrested three times in six months, and the police Special Forces were accused of arresting young men "dressed as women or simply wearing makeup".

== Lesbians ==
The Grupo Lésbico de Tijuana joined the national lesbian network in 1987, and there was a lesbian fanzine alongside the gay magazines; Edgar Antonio Madrid wrote a 2011 thesis on lesbophobia in the city. Punch wrote in 2022 that lesbians have long had fewer spaces than gay men and held "lesbian parties" in homes; Yadira's, a karaoke bar a block east of Revolución, is an informal lesbian hangout. In 2016 the civil registry in La Mesa refused to register Verónica Ibarra and Karina Tejada as the mothers of their daughter; in 2026 a child of two mothers was legally recognized in Tijuana.

== Trans people and sex work ==
Debra A. Castillo and colleagues estimated 200 to 300 travesti and transgender sex workers in Tijuana in the early 2000s; their work had moved from drag shows to massage parlors, the street and Teniente Guerrero Park. They found the police were the main source of violence: workers paid about US$20 to avoid 36 hours in the "20 de Noviembre" jail, and carrying condoms could be taken as evidence of sex work. In 2001 twelve travestis accused police of extortion and sexual assault; the Centro Binacional de Derechos Humanos documented 47 incidents in seven months, and the police chief promised dismissals. In 2013 Centro SER said police in the Zona Norte detained trans people to meet arrest quotas. In 2024 the state human rights commission issued a recommendation over a trans woman whose forearms were broken in a police cell in 2019.

A 2013 survey of 100 trans women in Tijuana found 22% were HIV-positive and 66% were doing sex work; 94% had experienced violence, and 94% were born outside Baja California, mostly in Guerrero, Sinaloa and Sonora. The activist Susana Barrales of Unión Trans estimated about 200 trans women in Tijuana and 1,500 in the state in 2025. In September 2021 Regina Cornejo became the city's deputy director of diversity and inclusion; Zeta called her the first trans woman in public office in the city government. In 2024 sex workers in the Zona Norte, joined by Barrales, won monthly meetings with the city and a promise of "zero tolerance" for police harassment. On 30 March 2026 the city lent a building to La Casita de Unión Trans, the first municipal property loan to a trans organization.

Male sex work centers on Plaza Santa Cecilia, Teniente Guerrero Park and the Calle Cuarta walkway. Nora Bringas and Ruth Gaxiola found the clients in the plaza were mostly American men over 30, many of them married, and that bar waiters collected an exit fee of US$20 to 25. As one of their interviewees put it, "aquí es otro país, aquí nadie los conoce" ("here it's another country, here nobody knows them").

== Rights and politics ==
The first same-sex wedding in Baja California was in Mexicali on 17 January 2015, after an 18-month fight; Tijuana's mayor, Jorge Astiazarán, said at the time that "In Tijuana there is no discrimination". Tijuana's first, between Luis Vargas and Michael Bujazán, was on 26 August 2015 under a court injunction (amparo). From 2017 couples could marry without one through agreements mediated by the state human rights commission, and by April 2019 more than 100 Tijuana couples had done so. A constitutional reform failed by one vote in July 2020 and passed on 16 June 2021 by 18 to 4; PAN deputy Eva María Vásquez called it an "arbitrariedad" (arbitrary act).

Congress passed a law letting adults change their gender on their birth certificates on 27 January 2022, and extended it to minors on 20 June 2024 while anti-abortion groups protested outside. In April 2022 it voted 20 to 4 to ban conversion therapy. Governor Marina del Pilar Ávila sent the bill back with objections; activist Eduardo Arredondo blamed "the pressure that conservative groups put on her", and opponents argued for religious freedom and parents' rights. Congress accepted her changes in May 2022.

There is also organized opposition. On 10 September 2016 about 8,000 people marched against same-sex marriage with the Frente Nacional por la Familia, and Archbishop Francisco Moreno Barrón attended; its coordinator said "Hay una sola familia, es natural" ("There is only one family, it is natural"). Lorenzo Herrera called it a "hate march", though that same year he told Zeta that acceptance by the population at large was good. Activists have also criticized city hall: Herrera said the city cut his organization's funding in 2019, and in 2024 that the diversity office had never had its own budget. The Comunidad Cultural de Tijuana LGBTI (COCUT) held the first LGBT festival in the city in June 2010 and has filed collective amparos and pushed for a transfemicide law.

== Migrants and asylum seekers ==
A "Trans Gay Migrant Caravan" of 16 people arrived in April 2017. In May 2018 armed men robbed a shelter housing trans women from that spring's caravan, and it was set on fire. In November 2018 about 80 LGBTQ migrants were the first members of the large Central American caravan to reach Tijuana. They were housed in Playas de Tijuana, where neighbors protested. Four couples from the group were married at Enclave Caracol, a vegan restaurant and arts space that took migrants in because most shelters were religious. Thirty trans women from the caravan applied for asylum together, and ten won their cases.

Yolanda Rocha founded Jardín de las Mariposas in 2011 as a home for people with HIV, and it has taken in migrants since 2016. Casa Arcoíris opened in 2019; Casa de Luz and La Casita de Unión Trans also house LGBTQ migrants. During Title 42 the shelters were full beyond capacity. In 2023 the city counted about 200 LGBTQ migrants in Tijuana; the director of Jardín de las Mariposas said it had helped 607 people cross legally in 2022 and that 90% of the trans women who arrived had survived attempts on their lives.

== HIV ==
Lorenzo Herrera told Zeta in 2024 that when the community did its own first HIV tests, about 40 years earlier, 11% of 200 came back positive; his Fondo de Asistencia para el SIDA was seeing about 10,000 people a year, mostly sex workers. A 2012 study of 191 men who have sex with men in Tijuana found an HIV prevalence of 20%, and 89% of those infected did not know it. Prevalence among trans women was estimated at 22%. In 2023 Tijuana had 518 of Baja California's 686 new diagnoses; PrEP is free at the state's CAPASITS clinics.

== Violence ==
Janine Huerta, a trans activist, was found stabbed on 28 August 2020; the case was still unsolved in 2024. Kendra Medina González, 26, was killed and her body burned in July 2021, and COCUT counted six hate crimes in Tijuana between May and July of that year. In October 2022 Karen Janelly, 24, was shot dead in an attack on a lesbian couple. In August 2024 someone tried to set fire to Susana Barrales's home; she had received four death threats that year. By April 2025 four LGBTQ people had been murdered in Baja California that year. In the Sodoma case the prosecutor found no evidence of a hate crime.

== In research ==
Israel Sanz Sánchez studied the slang of Spanish-speaking gay men in Tijuana, Tecate and San Diego. Pablo Caraballo looked at cruising on Grindr and argued that whiteness and class shape who is desirable. David Román Islas Vela studied gay men over 65 and the "gerontoespacios" (spaces of older men) they make for themselves. Rodrigo Pérez Toledo wrote on migration and male homoeroticism in the city, and Miguel A. Avalos on queer people who commute between San Diego and Tijuana.

== See also ==
- LGBTQ rights in Mexico
- LGBTQ culture in Mexico City
- LGBTQ culture in San Diego
- San Diego Pride
