= Killing of Ali Forney =

LGBT advocate, sex worker, murder victim

The killing of Ali Forney occurred on December 5, 1997. Forney was an African-American gay and gender non-conforming transgender youth who also used the name Luscious.

Forney was raised by their single mother in Brooklyn. They started working as a sex worker at age 13, and they were subsequently rejected by their family. They were homeless for several years. They became ineligible for city youth shelters at age 19. In 1996, Forney was invited to explain the needs of homeless transgender youth to social workers.

In December 1997, Forney was shot to death in Harlem. They were the third young transgender sex worker murdered in Harlem within a period of several months. The murder case was investigated by the NYPD, but was never solved. In 2002, the Ali Forney Center for homeless LGBT youth was named after the murder victim.

== Background ==
Forney was born in Charlotte, North Carolina, and raised in Brooklyn, by a single mother. Forney said that they first engaged in sex work at 13, and that the $40 made them feel rich. Rejected by their family at around that time, Forney was put in a group home, from which they soon ran away. Forney was in a series of foster placements, but found the streets preferable. Forney, assigned male at birth, continued to work as a sex worker, often dressed in women's clothing. Forney admitted to using crack cocaine "because it eased the degradation and fear" from sex work.

At 17, Forney joined the Safe Horizon Streetwork program, where counselors helped them acquire a Social Security card and a medical card. Forney completed a GED and, at the time of their death, had started to work with the staff to help other homeless youth. After turning 18, Forney received a settlement for a childhood car accident, but remained estranged from their family, and was ineligible for city youth shelters after reaching the age of 19.

Proudly HIV-negative, Forney became good at peer counseling and promoted safety, carrying a pocketful of condoms and offering them to drug dealers. Forney said, "I became a peer educator because I see so many HIV-infected people on the stroll. Even now, there are people who don't know how to use condoms." In 1996, Forney was invited to San Francisco, California, to tell social workers about the needs of homeless transgender youth.

== Killing ==
At 4 a.m. on December 5, 1997, Forney was found by the police shot to death on the sidewalk in front of a housing project on East 131st Street in Harlem. According to The New York Times Forney was the third young transgender sex worker murdered in Harlem in fourteen months. Despite an investigation by the NYPD, Forney's murder has never been solved.

Over seventy people attended Forney's memorial service.

== Ali Forney Center ==
When Carl Siciliano started a center for homeless LGBT youth in New York in 2002, he named it the Ali Forney Center (also known as AFC) in Forney's memory. The center opened in June 2002. It serves mostly Manhattan and Brooklyn youth aged 16 to 24 years, providing them with safe shelter and other help in addition to counseling for their families where needed.

== See also ==
- Homelessness among LGBT youth in the United States
- List of unsolved murders (1980–1999)
