= A Special Agent =

1993 book by Frank Buttino with Lou Buttino

A Special Agent: Gay and Inside the FBI
- Cover of A Special Agent
- Authors: Frank Buttino, Lou Buttino
- Language: English
- Subject: FBI, gay men
- Genre: Memoir
- Publisher: Morrow
- Publication date: 1993
- Publication place: United States
- Pages: 351
- ISBN: 9780688119584
- OCLC: 966020751

A Special Agent: Gay and Inside the FBI is Frank Buttino's 1993 memoir, co-authored with his brother Lou. Buttino writes about his career as a special agent in the Federal Bureau of Investigation (FBI), and his dismissal once his homosexuality was made public. Buttino writes that the FBI had a policy of blackmailing gay men into resigning, but the Department of Justice said he was fired because he had lied to investigators and he was therefore susceptible to blackmail by members of the public. Buttino's class-action lawsuit was settled by the FBI in 1994, and it led to an end to homophobic discrimination for employees of the United States federal government.

== Summary ==
Buttino writes about growing up as a closeted gay man in Canastota, New York. He graduated from Colgate University and joined the FBI in 1968. He was based in their San Diego field office in the late 1980s. Buttino was suspended on September 29, 1989, and he lost his security clearance in January 1991.

According to the United States Department of Justice (DOJ), Buttino was dismissed from his job because he lied to investigators and he was therefore susceptible to blackmail by members of the public. However, Buttino writes that he was framed by the FBI when an anonymous note revealing his homosexuality was sent to a co-worker in 1988, and Buttino lied about it to his supervisor to keep his job before admitting it was true. He was subsequently probed about every single aspect of his gay identity while his past heterosexual encounters were ignored. Buttino adds that the Office of Professional Responsibility had a policy of blackmailing homosexual agents into resigning. Buttino draws a distinction between field agents, who supported him, and the bureaucracy, whom he blames for his dismissal.

By 1991, Buttino was described as an "activist" by The Los Angeles Times, and he attended the San Diego Pride festival. He was interviewed on The Oprah Winfrey Show, Larry King Live, and 60 Minutes. He co-authored his memoir with his brother, and it was published in June 1993. He also sued the DOJ in December 1993.

== Impact ==
The FBI decided to stop discriminating against LGBT applicants in December 1993. They settled Buttino's lawsuit in 1994, and Buttino received $153,000 in compensation plus a pension of $1,746 from 2007, the year of his retirement. In 2011, Buttino hosted a book signing in Palm Springs, California. The Desert Sun noted that his lawsuit had led to an end to homophobic discrimination for all employees of the United States federal government.
