= Gay and Lesbian Community Center of Southern Nevada =

Nonprofit organization in Nevada, US

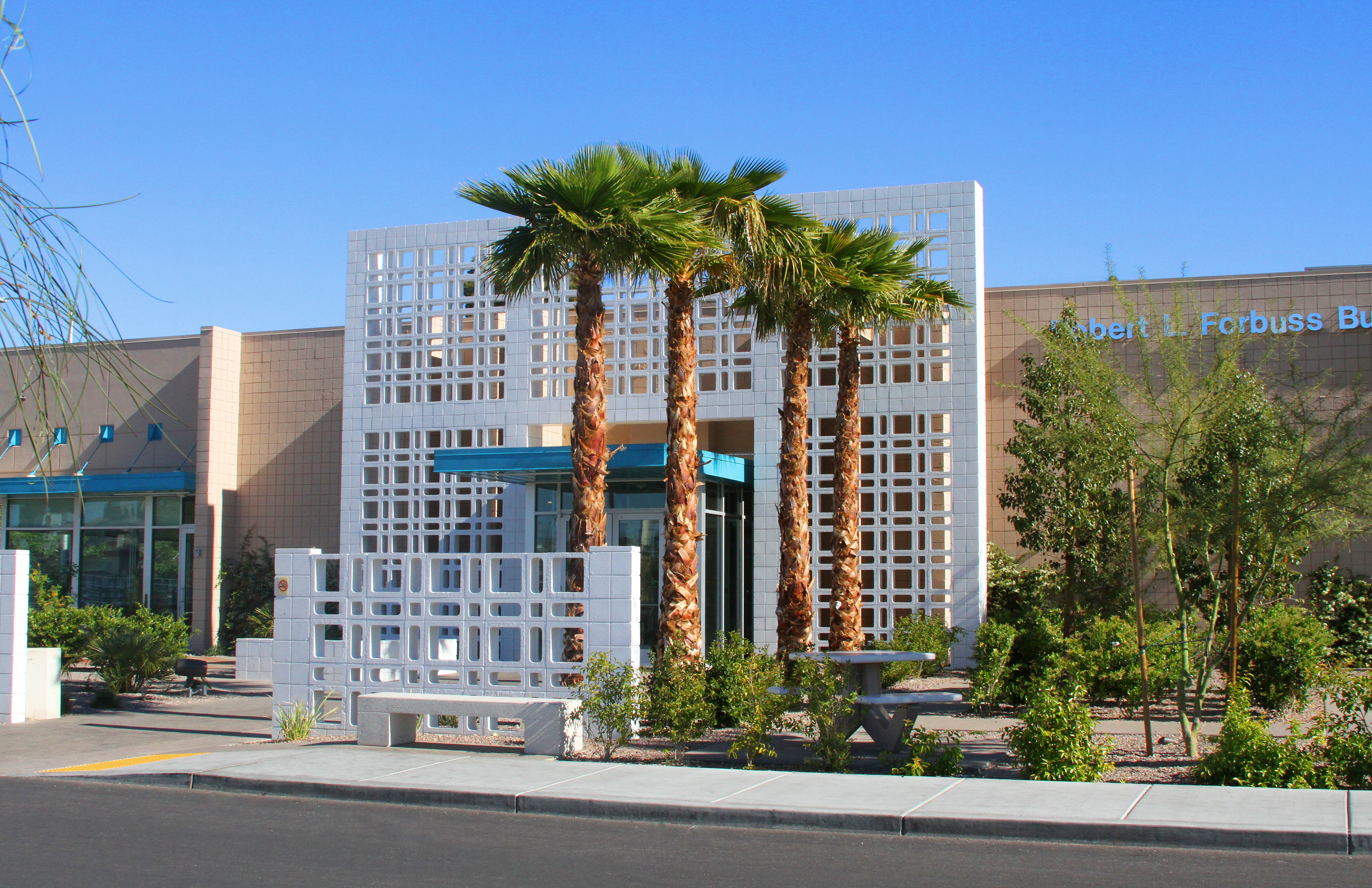
- The Robert L. Forbuss Building
- Founded: October 15, 1993
- Purpose: Support and Social Groups, Health and Wellness Programs, Community Center, Arts & Culture, Cultural Competency, Advocacy
- Location: 401 S. Maryland Pkwy., Las Vegas, Nevada, US
- Coordinates: 36.162013675669996°N 115.13469001535141°W
- Website: www.thecenterlv.org

The Gay and Lesbian Community Center of Southern Nevada, known to most simply as The Center, is a nonprofit organization located in Las Vegas, Nevada, United States, that has served the local LGBTQ community since 1993. In 2013, The Center moved into the new Robert L. Forbuss Building—named after the Las Vegas educator who helped fund the project—and also began serving the low to moderate income residents of the Downtown Las Vegas area. Programs and services are generally free to the public. The Center is a member of Centerlink, the national membership organization for LGBT centers.

== Programs and Services ==
The Center's staff leads several groups that meet weekly:

- ACT III (Aging Communities Together) — for seniors 50 and up
- Identi-T* — for transgender and gender non-conforming individuals
- QVolution — for youth ages 13 to 24
- Vegas Mpowerment Project — for gay, bisexual and transgender men 18 to 35
- ELLE — for lesbian and bisexual women 18 to 30
- The F Word — a group to discuss feminism

Numerous peer-led groups also meet at The Center, including:

- Alcoholics Anonymous, Marijuana Anonymous, Narcotics Anonymous, Sex Addicts Anonymous
- Gay Men's Forum
- The L Group

Many services are offered free of charge to the public:

- David Bohnett CyberCenter
- David Parks LGBTQ Lending Library
- Free HIV and syphilis testing for Nevada residents
- Free vaccinations for Nevada residents
- Information and referrals to other local organizations and services

== Noteworthy Happenings ==
At a pro-marriage equality rally at The Center's previous location in 2008, comedian Wanda Sykes gave a speech and came out as being in a same-sex relationship, one month after marrying her partner, Alex Niedbalski.

Nevada State Senator Kelvin Atkinson proposed to his partner, Woody, at a rally held at The Center on Tuesday, October 7, 2014, celebrating the 9th U.S. Circuit Court of Appeals' decision to overturn Nevada's prohibition on gay marriage.

Following the legalization of same-sex marriage in Nevada but prior to the Supreme Court's ruling granting same-sex marriage in the United States, The Center hosted its first transgender wedding ceremony on March 21, 2015, between Jazmynne Young and Mark Matthews.

Oregon bakers Aaron and Melissa Klein from Sweet Cakes by Melissa, a business fined for refusing service to a lesbian couple in 2013, mailed a cake to several LGBT organizations, including The Center, in August 2015 with a heart-shaped message on top saying "We really do love you". The cake was accompanied by a DVD of the film Audacity by Ray Comfort.

== Vandalism ==
The center was vandalized twice in 2019: with an arson in June, and with a spray-painted slur in September. In response, the director of operations explained, "it energizes us to dig in deeper and really work hard to continue what we normally do. ... We want to be happy, joyous and free just like anyone else, but it requires we have to fight and work for it."

== See also ==
- List of LGBT community centers in the United States
- LGBT rights in Nevada
- Same-sex marriage in Nevada
