= The San Diego LGBT Community Center =

Nonprofit organization

Coordinates: 32.7489°N 117.1477°W

- Founded: 1973; 53 years ago
- Type: Nonprofit organization
- Legal status: 501(c)(3)
- Location: 3909 Centre St, San Diego, California 92103
- Region served: San Diego
- CEO: Caroline Dessert
- Website: thecentersd.org

The San Diego LGBT Community Center is an LGBTQ community center based in San Diego, California.

== History ==
=== Origins ===
In the aftermath of the 1969 Stonewall riots, several gay liberation groups organized across the United States, including the Gay Liberation Front. In February 1970, a chapter of the Gay Liberation Front formed at San Diego State University. The organization met resistance from the California State University system, with Chancellor Glenn Dumke informing SDSU's president Malcolm Love that no group called “Gay” could be associated with a CSU campus. Love informed the group that to continue operating as a campus organization, they would have to remove the word "Gay" from their name. Instead, the GLF chose to keep its name and moved its operations off campus.

In 1971, the GLF absorbed a phone helpline founded by Gays United for Liberty and Freedom. The helpline, called the Gay Information Center, was monitored by GLF volunteers using an answering machine in a borrowed closet. The high volume of helpline calls led to discussions surrounding the need for services for the gay community in San Diego and in 1972, members of the GLF met as a Planning Committee to discuss opening a Gay Center in San Diego.

=== Center for Social Services ===
In 1973, the Center for Social Services opened in Golden Hill, San Diego, to provide resources and a community gathering space for LGBT people. Initial services at the center included a crisis intervention hotline, counseling, educational programs including a speaker’s bureau and a lending library, and a prisoner parole and probation program for LGBT prisoners. Over the next several years, the center expanded its services through increased funding from the federal government, United Way, and community events.

In 1974, the Center for Social Services hosted a yard sale and potluck in celebration of the anniversary of Stonewall and to raise funds for the center. An unplanned and unpermitted march following this event may have been the first San Diego Pride march.

Throughout the 1970s, the Center for Social Services continued supporting San Diego Pride, with executive director Jeri Dilno obtaining the first permit for the San Diego Pride march. Dilno was additionally the first female Executive Director and first paid staff member of the center.

=== Lesbian and Gay Men’s Community Center ===
In 1980, the Gay Center for Social Services changed its name to the Lesbian and Gay Men’s Community Center and moved to a new location in Hillcrest. The center remained at this location until 1992, where it moved to 916 Normal Street.

During this period, the Center's services continued to expand, including the Lesbian Health Project, the Holistic AIDS Response Program (HARP), and one of the first same-sex domestic violence programs in the nation.

In 1999, the Center moved again to its current location of 3909 Center Street. There, the center opened the Hillcrest Youth Center, a drop-in space and recreational center for LGBTQ youth.

=== The San Diego LGBT Community Center ===
In 2002, the Lesbian and Gay Men’s Community Center was renamed to the San Diego Lesbian, Gay, Bisexual, Transgender Community Center.

Over the next two decades, the Center established specialized services focusing on LGBT seniors, a Women's Resource Center, Latin@ services, family services, transgender services, and Black services.

During the COVID-19 pandemic, the Center closed its building. During this time, the Center provided remote services and renovated the building before re-opening in May 2022.

== Services ==
The San Diego LGBT Community Center provides targeted programs and services for Black, Latino, men, women, family, seniors, youth, and transgender populations. Additionally, the center provides housing, sexual health, and community engagement services. In 2024, the Center provided over 90,000 service visits.

== See also ==
- LGBTQ culture in San Diego
