= Interrogation Room 109 =

2015 film directed by Anthony Malachi

Interrogation Room 109 is a 2015 American independent urban drama written and directed by Anthony Malachi, Safiyah Chiniere and produced by O-Park Productionz, in association with Joey Grant Entertainment & SeeGold Entertainment.

The film follows Slice, a Jersey City drug dealer, determined to win back his ex-girlfriend, Sharon. However, Sharon's new man, G-low, stands firmly in his way. Slice plots a devious scheme, complete with crooked cops, drugs, set-ups, murder, and blackmail to ensure G-low goes down, and stays down. The film was in part created to be used as an intervention tool for inner-city youth.

The movie premiered on March 1, 2015, at Saint Peter's University in Jersey City, New Jersey, United States.

== Plot ==
Interrogation Room 109 follows the quick rise and cataclysmic fall of the business partnership between Slice, a well-established Jersey City drug dealer, and G-low, a good-natured guy who naively entered the hustling world for extra money so he can play provider to his girlfriend, Sharon. However, Slice used to go out with Sharon and he's still in love with her. G-low, naively approaches Slice to become partners in the drug game even after learning that Slice used to date Sharon. Slice reassures G-low his feelings for Sharon are long-gone and everything moving forward is about business. Against his best friend, Cee's, warnings, G-low takes a chance and joins forces with Slice.

With a car full of illegal drugs, Slice intentionally runs a red light and they are picked up by the police. During his interrogations, G-low begins to second guess himself and the interrogation tests his mettle and takes a toll on him. Meanwhile, during his detainment, Slice conspires with cop Detective. Monroe to ensure his own preservation, and to further set G-low up. Slice has Detective Jones mark two kilos in evidence, when there were really three in their possession.

Feeling the pressure of being incarcerated and interrogated, G-low allows himself to be blackmailed by Det. Jones and agrees to pay him $5,000, and then plans to run. Slice figures that G-low will run, leave Sharon behind, and then he can blame G-low for the missing drugs when it comes time to answer to their supplier's inevitable inquiries about his missing drugs and money. And, of course- Slice figures he could win back Sharon, even though he has a very jealous live-in girlfriend, Lisa.

G-low unknowingly throws a wrench in Slice's plan and pays their supplier, Rico, a visit to update him and smooth things over. This is when G-low learns that there were three kilos in the car- not two like he originally thought. It dawns on G-low that Slice has set him up. As he's coming out of Rico's apartment, he runs into Slice who realizes the cat is out of the bag.

Up until now, neither detective was aware that his partner has a non-kosher relationship with their respective detainees, which feeds into the distrust between Slice and G-low. Slice figures out that there's something fishy and pays Detective Monroe a visit to get the rest of the drugs Monroe was holding, and to kill him. His next target is G-low.

G-low now has more problems than he ever expected. Sharon leaves him in the midst of the chaos and he is still left to deal with a crooked cop, who upped the ante on him, and a former business partner with a major personal vendetta against him. Detective Jones drags G-low to Slice's apartment to get in on the deal with the extra kilo that Slice took from Detective Monroe.

In the meantime, a young kid who is trying to make a name for himself in the streets learned that Slice killed his homey. He seeks the help of an Wildpit, an OG, and Banks, a wanna-be gangsta to seek revenge on Slice. When Wildpit and C-note make their move, they find Slice with G-low and Detective Jones and open fire.

== Cast ==
- Anthony Malachi as G-low, a good-natured young man who turns to hustling in order to impress and lavish his girlfriend, Sharon, with the finer things.
- Lance Booth as Slice, an sinister, arrogant, heavy-weight drug dealer who sets G-low up in order to win back his ex-girlfriend Sharon.
- Joey Grant as Detective Monroe, one of the crooked officers who busts Slice and G-low, and has an off-the-record business relationship with Slice
- Gil Gilead as Detective Jones, one of the crooked officers who busts Slice and G-low and later blackmails G-low.
- Tayo Oredein as Sharon, G-lows level-headed, but high maintenance girlfriend. She is also Slice's ex-girlfriend.
- Jillian Goytia as Lisa, Slice's current girlfriend.
- Vern Wilson as C-Note, a young gangster who seeks revenges on Slice for killing his friend.
- Reco Alford as Wildpit, an OG who teams up with C-Note to exact revenge on Slice.
- Claude Joseph as C, an OG who is G-low's best friend and confidant.
- Jofreey “Crash” Gant as Deroe, a thug in business with Slice. He is also Lisa's cousin.
- Michael Royes as Rico, a big-time drug dealer who supplies Slice and G-low
- CiCi Steed as Lisa's friend
- Juan M. Montaño as Fred, a petty criminal who got mixed up with Slice and G-low
- Rochelle Walker as Camille, Sharon's friend
- Mohammad Kamara as Banks, a timid wanna-be gangster who's trying to keep up with C-note and Wildpit

== Production ==
The budget for the indie film was approximately $6,000. The movie was shot and edited by Safiyah Chiniere, a self-taught videographer using a single camera. The movie was filmed throughout Jersey, though it was mostly shot in Jersey City. Hudson Pride Connections Center, a Jersey City community center located near Journal Square was used for various scenes throughout the movie serving as Officer Monroe's apartment, the police office, and Rico's home.

The director raised close to $3000 with a Kickstarter Campaign to help offset post-production costs, related events, promotions and marketing.

== Reception ==
The film received some favorable press including write ups for NJ.com, The Jersey Journal, Broadway World, and others. Anthony Malachi was also interviewed by Larry Mendte on WJLP 3.

The movie premiered on March 1, 2015, at Saint Peter's University in Jersey City, New Jersey, United States.
