= The Queer Trans Project =

American LGBTQ+ support organization

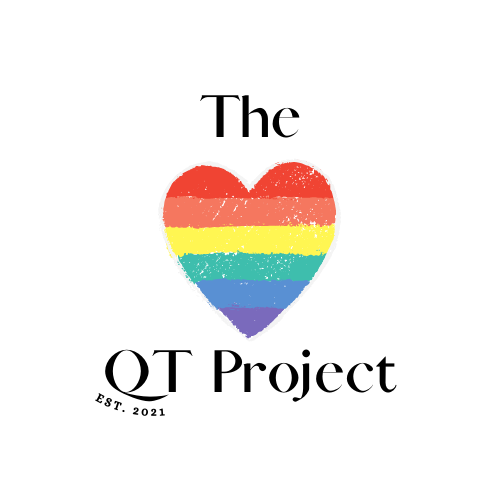
- Founded: 2021
- Type: Nonprofit
- Purpose: LGBTQ community
- Headquarters: Jacksonville, Florida, U.S.
- Executive director: Cielo Sunsarae
- Website: queertransproject.org

The Queer Trans Project (QTP) is a nonprofit LGBTQ community center based in Jacksonville, Florida. The QTP was founded in 2021 by Cielo Sunsarae, a Black transmasculine organizer who serves as executive director of the organization.

Through its website, the QTP offers free "Build-A-Queer" kits containing gender-affirming products like binders, packers, and tucking tape. The kits include handwritten letters from community members. The organization also partners with a volunteer pilot program to offer free flights to transgender people needing gender-affirming healthcare.

== See also ==
- LGBTQ rights in Florida
