= Q Center =

LGBT community center in Portland, Oregon, U.S.

- Logo

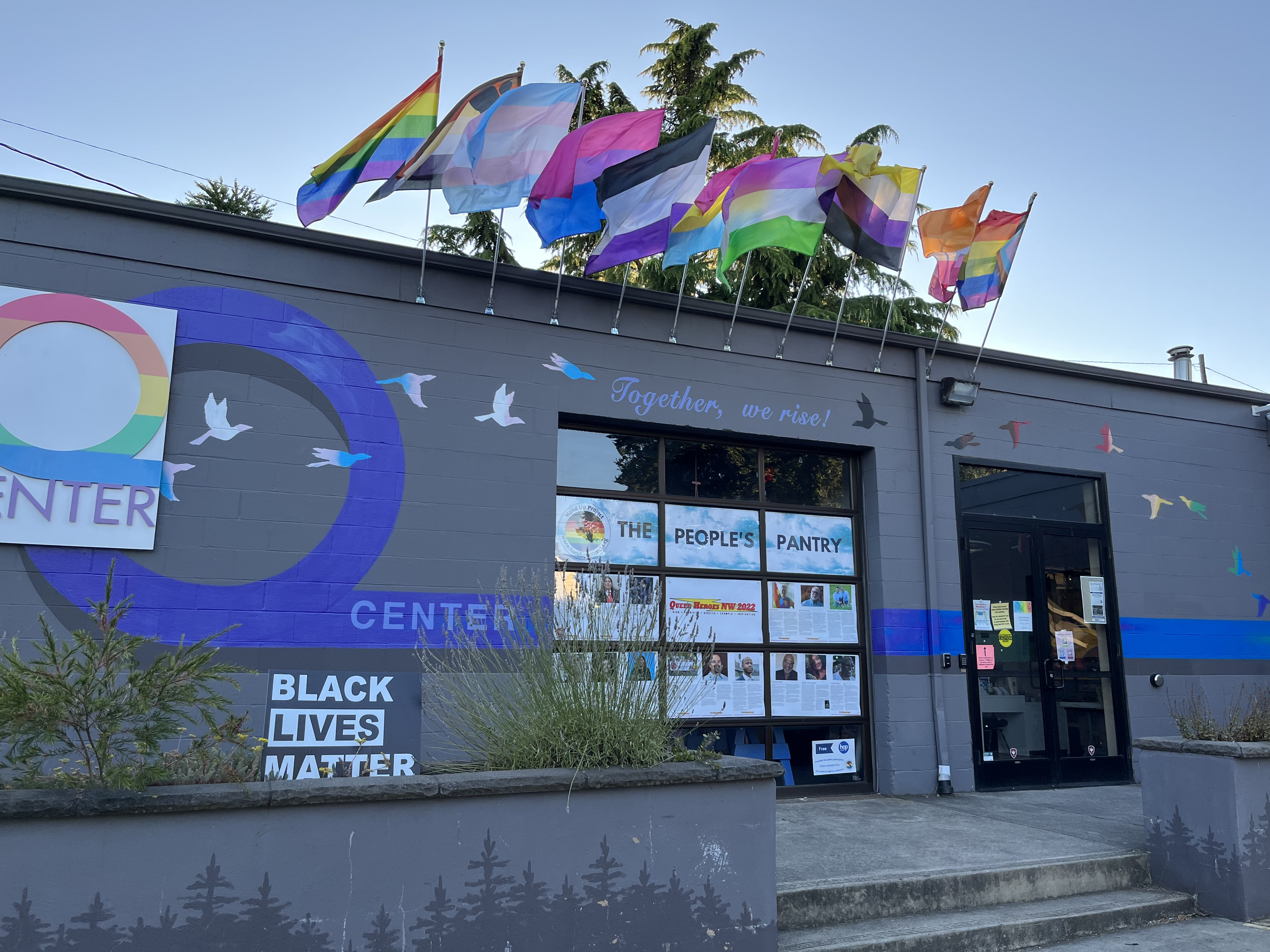
- The center's exterior in 2022
- Formation: 2005; 21 years ago
- Type: Nonprofit
- Purpose: LGBTQ community center
- Location: Portland, Oregon, United States
- Coordinates: 45.55365°N 122.67584°W
- Website: pdxqcenter.org

Q Center is an LGBTQ community center and nonprofit organization in Portland, Oregon, United States. It was founded in part by former mayor Sam Adams. The space has also housed Pride Northwest, which organizes the city's annual pride parade and other festivities. In 2023, Q Center was the largest LGBTQ community center in the Pacific Northwest.

== History ==
The community center was established in 2005, championed by then-city Commissioner Sam Adams. Kendall Clawson, an African American lesbian, served as its first executive director. David Martinez, co-founder and chair of Portland Latino Gay Pride, was a founding board member.

The center relocated to North Mississippi Avenue in 2009. In 2012, Q Center and the Oregon Bureau of Labor and Industries (BOLI) announced "a yearlong community engagement and advocacy project to provide education and advocacy about housing discrimination based on sexual orientation and gender identity". As of 2017, Q Center organized monthly Rainbow Walk in the Trees meet-and-greet events at Hoyt Arboretum in Washington Park.

== See also ==
- LGBTQ culture in Portland, Oregon
- List of LGBTQ community centers in the United States
