= Prism Community Collective =

LGBTQ community center in Colorado, U.S.

- Formation: 2024
- Type: Nonprofit
- Purpose: Community center for LGBTQ+ people
- Website: cosprismcollective.org

Prism Community Collective is a community center located in Colorado Springs. Prism is focused on offering a safe space for members of the LGBTQ+ community. Site director Stoney Roberts said that part of the reason for its founding was the community's need for connection and sense of belonging after the Club Q shooting on November 19, 2022.

== Background ==
Prism's parent company, ChangeLine, is a "nonprofit civic hub" based in Colorado Springs. ChangeLine's approach to creating Prism stemmed from their pre-existing involvement in "LGBTQ+ health equity work," which had built trust in the company from the Colorado Springs LGBTQ+ community. Because of the existing community trust, ChangeLine was able to center "the voices of those most impacted" when building Prism.

== Resources Offered ==
Prism provides gender-affirming clothes, medical services, and lounge areas for its members. Each room in the center is named after victims of the Club Q shooting. Prism also offers connections to gender-affirming health care providers. Additionally, the Prism Provider Directory features 50 mental health providers. One of these is Diversus Health, which is a mental health provider in Colorado. 10% of their clients are members of the queer community.

== Notable staff ==
- John Arcediano (Program & Outreach Director)
  - Arcediano is a survivor of the Club Q shooting. He has since shifted his career towards "survivor and LGBTQ+ advocacy and support."
- Stoney Roberts (Site Director)
  - Roberts is a prominent figure in the Colorado Springs area. They previously worked at One Colorado as the Southern Colorado Field Organizer and at the Colorado Department of Regulatory Agencies.
- James Slaugh (Office Assistant)
  - Slaugh is another survivor of the Club Q shooting and is an advocate for "gun safety and LGBTQIA+ rights."

== History ==
Safe spaces are spaces that are protected and facilitate "a sense of security," being grounded in psychological, social, emotional, and physical safety. Being a queer nightclub, Club Q was seen as a safe space for the LGBTQ+ community. Site director Roberts spoke with Them magazine about their experience going to the club, saying "it was the one place where you could go an be unapologetically who you were."

In a study that surveyed members of the queer community in Colorado Springs after the Club Q shooting, it was found that 35.5% of interviewees knew someone who was killed and 32.2% knew someone who was injured in the incident. The study found that bias-motivated violence has "strong psychological consequences among the affected community."

Given the feelings of the LGBTQ+ community in Colorado Springs following the shooting, the staff at Prism said "it was clear the community needed a long-term option to serve those impacted by the shooting." Staff member Arcediano elaborated when speaking to Colorado Public Radio, saying "expecting survivors to find and navigate resources when they're in that state is unreasonable and irresponsible."
