= American Fertility Association =

American non-profit

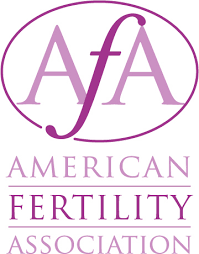

The American Fertility Association is a national non-profit organization based in New York City, which advocates and serves as a resource for topics related to fertility preservation, reproductive health and family building.

== Overview ==
Founded in 1999, The AFA has been instrumental in advising health care professionals and related industry and legislative bodies on fertility issues. A push by The AFA led to the passage of a New York state mandate in 2002 requiring insurance companies to cover the cost of certain diagnostics and treatments.
