= Pride Center of the Capital Region =

Nonprofit organization

- Founded: 1970; 56 years ago
- Type: Nonprofit organization
- Legal status: 501(c)(3)
- Location: 332 Hudson Ave, Albany, New York United States
- Region served: Capital District
- Executive Director: Nathaniel Gray
- Employees: 3 (2025)
- Website: capitalpridecenter.org

The Pride Center of the Capital Region is an LGBTQ community center based in Albany, New York and serving the Capital District of New York. Founded in 1970, the Pride Center of the Capital Region is the oldest continuously operating LGBTQ community center in the United States.

== History ==
=== Early history ===
In the aftermath of the 1969 Stonewall riots, chapters of the Gay Liberation Front formed across the United States. These groups supported a more radical agenda which supported coming out to friends and family, anti-capitalism, and openly claimed the word gay, which had been shunned by previous generations of activists.

In 1970, a drag queen involved in the Stonewall riots (likely Sylvia Rivera) spoke to members of the LGBTQ community in Albany who were facing similar issues surrounding discrimination and police raids of Gay bars. This led to the creation of the Tri-Cities Gay Liberation Front, which first met on September 9, 1970. In 1971, the group organized a statewide march on the New York state capital. Marchers demanded the repeal of anti-sodomy, solicitation, loitering, and cross-dressing laws as well as the enactment of non-discrimination protections in employment and housing.

In 1972, the Tri-Cities Gay Liberation Front became the Capital District Gay Community Council and opened a Community House at 250 Lark Street in Albany. The Community House was envisioned as a drop-in space where community members could gather for social events and distribute information. The House also distributed a monthly newsletter called Community, which contained editorials, poems, stories, and local events.

In 1974, the Community House moved to 332 Hudson Avenue and later purchased the space for $14,000 from the Washington Park Free Clinic, who offered the space to the Community House at a discounted rate. Later, the Council changed its name to the Capital District Gay and Lesbian Community Council (CDGLCC) to reflect the presence and importance of lesbians in the organization.

=== 1974–2008 ===
CDGLCC served as a meeting space for other LGBTQ organizations, including political advocacy organizations. Members of the CDGLCC were involved with the Eleanor Roosevelt Democratic Club, which pushed for the passage of a Human Rights Ordinance to protect LGBTQ people in Albany. The ordinance would eventually pass in 1991. In 2004, the CDGLCC successfully advocated for a revision of the ordinance which would prohibit discrimination based on gender identity or gender expression.

In 1995, the Council organized an LGBTQ+ choir which would eventually become its own nonprofit, the Albany Voices of Pride.

=== 2008–present ===
In 2008, Nora Yates, former field director of Empire State Pride Agenda, joined CDGLCC as its executive director. Yates oversaw the renaming of CDGLCC to the Pride Center of Capital Region in 2011. The name was changed to encompass the entire LGBTQ community, including transgender, bisexual, and queer members. The change faced opposition from long-time members of the center, who opposed taking the words gay and lesbian out of the name of the center.

From 2012 to 2015, Curran Street served as the executive director of the Pride Center. In 2015, Michael Weidrich became the new executive direct of the Pride Center, leaving in 2016 to become the Director of Advancement at In Our Own Voices, an organization dedicated to LGBTQ+ people of color.

In 2017, Martha Harvey became the executive director the Pride Center of the Capital Region. Harvey faced controversy in July 2017 when she posted a link to an article from the website Feminist Current titled "Lesbianism is under attack, though not by the usual suspects," which suggested that lesbians felt threatened by transgender women. LGBTQ community members and several former Pride Center board members called for Harvey to resign and a new board be put in place. Board president Joseph Kerwin expressed his support for Harvey and declined to remove her from her post.

In 2020, the Pride Center shut down physical operations due to the COVID-19 pandemic. This resulted in a major loss of income for the Pride Center, resulting in cost-cutting measures including laying off executive director Martha Harvey. In 2021, the Pride Center re-opened with support from Albany political leaders, including a $25,000 check from state senator Neil Breslin. By 2022, the Pride Center had re-hired an executive director, with Nathaniel Gray joining in January 2022.

== Services ==
The Pride Center of the Capital Region offers free counseling and case management services, training and education for healthcare providers, schools, and other community organizations, and peer support groups. The Pride Center also hosts the annual Capital Pride Festival and Parade.
