= Making Opportunities for Upgrading Schools and Education =

- Making Opportunities for Upgrading Schools and Education
- Abbreviation: MOUSE
- Formation: 1997; 29 years ago
- Founder: Andrew Rasiej
- Legal status: Nonprofit
- Purpose: Youth development, technology education and support
- Region served: New York City
- Website: https://mouse.org

Making Opportunities for Upgrading Schools and Education (MOUSE) is a youth development and nonprofit organization in New York City, United States focused on integrating technology with New York City education. It was founded by Andrew Rasiej in 1997. It targets schools in underserved communities, as well as those with high levels of poverty or of minorities.

== Programs ==
MOUSE runs a program known as Mouse Squad, which focuses on troubleshooting technical problems with computers in New York public schools; the program was founded in 2000. Students in the after-school activity first go through six months of human-centered design training, followed by six months of working on making a prototype product with a mentor. Students in New York City get a chance to graduate into a wing of the program known as Mouse Corps, which was founded sometime around 2008.

In addition to the Mouse Squad, MOUSE also sponsors more advanced technical training, job shadow programs, and college-bound workshops for high school students, as well as providing expertise through industry partnerships. The organization communicates through its newsletter MOUSE Droppings and through conferences.

== History ==
Sometime before 2001, the organization teamed up with Arthur Anderson to create the Young Women's Technology Club. As of 2000, the organization has about 1500 volunteers and an annual budget of nearly $2M. As of 2006, it has over 200 students representing 32 schools.

In its first official year, following two pilot seasons, 31 schools participated; the previous year, 13 schools did.

A study conducted by Fordham University found that 87% of students who joined the MOUSE Squad felt like participation improved their academic skills and 92% of them felt that it increased their desire to stay in school. According to a separate study, it saved a school $19,000 annually in technical support costs.

As of 2012, the organization has over 80 Mouse Squad programs, and was praised by Michael Bloomberg as "provid[ing] our city’s schools with the technological tools and support to keep our children competitive in the information age."

On 4 April 2013, John C. Liu visited a MOUS program in Washington Heights, Manhattan. In a 2013 report, Liu recommended that MOUSE programs be offered at every public middle and high school.

On 13 November 2014, the MOUSE Squad at the Stephen A. Halsey School was honored by an official proclamation at a city hall. Among other things, the group works on 3D printing (including training other students and creating models of dinosaurs), creating games, Robotics, and helping to install new computers and printers.
