= LGBTQ culture in San Diego =

LGBTQ people in San Diego have historically faced discrimination from both the San Diego and California governments. San Diego was ranked the seventh most LGBTQ-friendly metro areas in the United States in 2023.

== Background ==
One of the largest LGBT communities in San Diego is Hillcrest. Hillcrest is called by some as San Diego's gayborhood.

In 2023, San Diego was ranked the seventh most LGBTQ-friendly metro areas in the United States. The ranking accounted for information such as pride events, gay bars per capita, and the amount of anti-LGBTQ legislation passed at the state level.

According to the San Diego Association of Governments, 22% of the 86 hate crimes committed in San Diego County in 2022 was due to someones' sexual orientation.

== History ==
=== Pre-Stonewall Era ===
In 1917, San Diego passed an ordinance to penalize any sexual activity outside of marriage—including activities by gay people. Similar 1850, 1872, and 1915 laws passed California punished homosexual activities.

San Diego's gay community grew due to the city becoming a military headquarters during World War II. Tolerant clubs served as a gathering place for gay men. 135 gay bars have opened in San Diego since 1945 due to the city's tolerance. Gay people began settling in Hillcrest in the late 1960s.

Due to homosexual activities being illegal under California and San Diego law at the time, the San Diego Police Department searched for homosexual people. The department staked out streets where homosexual people frequently traveled.

San Diego passed Ordinance 9439, which banned cross-dressing, in 1966. The people in favor of the ordnance stated, at the time, that the ordinance was necessary due to young sailors traveling to Vietnam were being robbed by men who were posing as women. Transgender people were effected by the law.

In 1967, Reverend Ed Hansen, who was a closeted Minister, created the Daughters and Sons of Society, which was San Diego's first gay group.

=== Post-Stone Wall - 2000 ===
Students of the San Diego State College founded a Gay Liberation Front branch for San Diego in March 1970. Due to the work of the Gay Liberation Front, the San Diego State Experimental College created the first gay studies classes in the United States.

In 1975, San Diego had its first Gay Pride Day.

In the late 1980s, activists started POCASE (People of Color AIDS Survival Effort) whose mission was to ensure that AIDS activism included people of cover and fought for access to care as well as against the racism, classism, homophobia, and sexism blocking access.

== See also ==
- LGBTQ culture in Tijuana
