= Ali Forney Center =

LGBT community center based in New York City

- Abbreviation: AFC
- Named after: Ali Forney
- Formation: 2002
- Founder: Carl Siciliano
- Founded at: New York
- Type: Non-governmental organization
- Executive Director: Alexander Roque
- Website: aliforneycenter.org

The Ali Forney Center (AFC), based in New York City, is the largest LGBT community center helping LGBTQ homeless youth in the United States. The AFC both manages and develops transitional housing for its clients. AFC helps approximately 2,000 youth clients each year, primarily between sixteen and twenty-four years old. AFC is named after Ali Forney, a transgender youth who was murdered in New York in 1997.

== Description ==
AFC has 15 residential sites in Brooklyn, Queens and Manhattan. AFC provideds 162 beds a night for homeless LGBTQ youth. AFC also runs a drop-in center, open 24/7, where clients can apply for housing, receive food and hygiene services and can access free medical and mental health care . AFC Founder Carl Siciliano says that the clients served by the drop-in center are often in the most acute crisis. AFC serves the LGBTQ population because they represent approximately forty percent of New York's young homeless people.

== History ==
Ali Forney Center marchers in 2011

AFC has served homeless LGBTQ youth in New York since 2002. The organization was founded by Carl Siciliano. When AFC first opened, it had only six beds. Siciliano, who knew and respected Forney, recalls that it was a challenge to secure funding for the first two years of the organization's operation. By 2007, AFC had 32 beds, 50 staff and offered wraparound services including free medical care, HIV testing, hygiene services, job training and job placement through the drop-in center.

During the aftermath of Hurricane Sandy in 2012, the drop-in center was flooded. A fundraiser hosted by Ally Sheedy helped raise money for the organization to relocate and reopen the drop-in center. An additional $100,000 was raised in one day to help the organization through word of mouth and social media.

In July 2015, AFC broke ground on its new Bea Arthur Residence. The housing site is named after the actress, Bea Arthur, who left $300,000 in her will to AFC. Arthur's endowment to the shelter enabled it stay open during the recession in 2009. In 2012, the New York City Council and the Manhattan borough president provided $3.3 million to renovate the building that will house the Bea Arthur Residence. In addition to the money that she left in her will, Arthur also helped raise $40,000 for AFC in 2005 with her one-woman show, "Bea Arthur on Broadway: Just Between Friends."

The organization has received donations from other sources as well in order to expand and help maintain operating costs. In 2009, the Episcopal Diocese of Long Island donated $200,000 to help the organization stay open after losing nearly $450,000 in funding due to the economic downturn. In 2025, “Toward the Light: Artists for the Ali Forney Center,” an exhibition at David Zwirner Gallery in New York, raised $950,000 for the Ali Forney Center by selling works by artists like Ross Bleckner, Marlene Dumas, Jenna Gribbon, Julie Mehretu, and Wolfgang Tillmans.

== See also ==
- Homelessness among LGBT youth in the United States
- List of homelessness organizations
