= LGBTI+ Federation =

The LGBTI+ Federation (French: Fédération LGBTI+), previously French Federation of LGBT Centres (French: Fédération Française des Centres LGBT), is the Alliance of associations and community centres for Lesbian, Gay, Bisexual, Trans, and Intersex people in France, as well as Associate Members.

Its purpose is to create solidarity among LGBT Centers and Associate Members in France, and ensure compliance with a Code of Ethics (Article 2, 1st paragraph of the articles of association) which provides an opening to all people, the development of a policy of active prevention, etc.

== Structure ==
The federation is composed of different members according to their rules:

=== Fellowship ===
The Fellowship of French LGBT Centers are allowed to sign the Charter.

- Cigales (Dijon)
- Gay Colors (Metz)
- Emergence57 (Sarreguemines)
- EX_Aequo_Reims (Reims)
- Forum Gay et Lesbian de Lyon (Lyon)
- I Am, I stay (Lille)
- Quazar (Angers)
- Gay Freedom Reims (Reims)
- LGP Region Centre (Tours)

=== Associate members ===
The associate members are individuals or legal entities wishing to support the LGBT Centers in their thoughts, actions and initiatives, they have an advisory:

Peer associations, corporations LGBT, LGBT associations animating a place, consider themselves as such and in this context closely affected by the values and objectives of the Charter or any plan to create an LGBT center or support a proposed LGBT Center

- Centre LGBT de Grenoble (Cigale) (Grenoble)
- Centre LGBT Paris-Île-de-France (Paris)
- An Nou Allé ! (Martinique et Antilles)
- Arc-en-Ciel 31 - AIHBIA (Toulouse)
- ARIS (Lyon)
- CGL Nîmes (Nîmes)
- CGLBT Rennes (Rennes)
- GAGL - Groupe Action Gay et Lesbien Loiret (Orléans)
- HOMogênE (Le Mans)
- Homo-Sphère (Nouméa)
- Les Enfants Terribles (Caen)

=== Observers ===
Observers (who are legal persons without being closely involved in the objectives of the Charter, identify with its values and can make a significant contribution to debates and projects of the Alliance)

- ADHEOS (Saintes)
- Agayri Southeast (Valencia)
- Agile (Clermont-Ferrand)
- Angel 34 (Montpellier)
- Angel 91 (Massy)
- Gay Aisne (Soissons)
- Arc-en-Ciel 28 (Chartres)
- CLG Nantes Atlantique (Nantes)
- Like It! (Rouen)
- Gay Union (Reunion)
- G2L - Gay and Lesbian Landes (Mont-de-Marsan)
- Homolog (Amiens)
- Approved (e) (Versailles)
- Memory of Sexualities (Marseille)

=== Local correspondents ===
Local correspondents (individuals who consider themselves affected by the values and objectives of the Charter or any plan to create an LGBT center or support a proposed LGBT Center).
