= Hudson Pride Connections Center =

Hudson Pride Center
- Formation: 1993
- Founder: Group of LGBTQ+ activists
- Type: Non-profit community services center
- Purpose: Support and advocacy for LGBTQ+ individuals and people living with HIV/AIDS
- Location: Jersey City and Union City, New Jersey
- Region served: Northeastern New Jersey
- Website: https://hudsonpride.org/

Hudson Pride Connections Center is a community services center serving the lesbian, gay, bisexual and transgender (LGBTQ) community, as well as all people living with HIV/AIDS in north eastern New Jersey.

== History ==
The organization was established in 1993 to serve as an advocate for both the LGBTQ and HIV/AIDS communities in Hudson County, New Jersey.

== Community center ==
Established in 2007, the organization's community center is located in the Journal Square area of Jersey City at 32 Jones Street, in a refurbished three story historic home from the late 19th century.

The community center also houses the Anthony Salandra Memorial Library for LGBT and HIV Resources.

The center has also been used to shoot scenes in several film projects including Finding Me and Interrogation Room 109.

== See also ==
- List of LGBT community centers in the United States
- Journal Square
