= Cable Positive =

Cable Positive was founded in February 1992 by three concerned cable executives, Jeffrey Bernstein, then with Request Television, Brad Wojcoski of HBO and June Winters, with the mission of organizing cable's resources in the fight against AIDS. It grew to include supporters from every major network, MSO, system, hardware manufacturer, trade association, media publication, and affiliated industry vendors and suppliers. In 2006, it launched the AIDS PSA campaign "Join the Fight", developed by film production company Kismet Films. In the Fall of 2009, Cable Positive announced it was discontinuing operations and closing its New York office.
