= Homelessness among LGBTQ youth in the United States =

Research shows that a disproportionate number of homeless youth in the United States identify as lesbian, gay, bisexual, transgender or queer, or LGBTQ. Researchers suggest that this is primarily a result of hostility or abuse from the young people's families leading to eviction or running away. In addition, LGBTQ youth are often at greater risk for certain dangers while homeless, including being the victims of crime, risky sexual behavior, substance use disorders, and mental health concerns.

== Prevalence ==
Although specific estimates of the percentage of United States homeless youth who identify as LGBTQ vary widely, estimates generally fall somewhere between 11 and 40 percent. Barriers to a more definitive percentage include the lack of a nationally representative study and the possibility of underreporting due to stigma associated with identifying as LGBTQ. The city from which the sample is drawn for each study may also account for a difference in estimates. For example, one 2004 study at the University of Nebraska–Lincoln noted that while estimates based on samples from Los Angeles range from 25 to 40 percent, a 1999 study of small and medium Midwestern cities concluded that only 6% of homeless youth there identified as LGBTQ.

According to the authors of this study, geographical location could affect these numbers. For example, due to the higher risk of coming out in rural, midwestern cities, youth may be more likely to either stay closeted there or to migrate to larger cities. Further, the authors continue, the differences might reflect differences in the ages of the samples in the different studies or other differences in sampling methodology. The study concludes that when taken together, a consensus can be found among the studies that 20% of homeless youth in magnet cities identify as gay, lesbian or bisexual, with the number being slightly lower in nonmagnet cities.

In a 2012 study, legal expert Nusrat Ventimiglia noted that studies focusing on the number of transgender youth who experience homelessness are less prevalent, and therefore including youth who identify as transgender but not as gay, lesbian or bisexual could result in an estimate of 40 percent.

== Explanations for overrepresentation ==
Researchers have posed a few core explanations for the overrepresentation of LGBTQ youth in the general United States homeless youth population. LGBTQ youth are more likely to be homeless because they run away or are evicted due to family conflict surrounding their sexual orientation or behavior. This explanation is supported by a 2011 survey study of a representative Massachusetts high school sample that found that LGBTQ youth were no more likely to be homeless and living with their parents than non-LGBTQ youth. Therefore, according to the study's authors, it may not be that LGBTQ youth are more likely to be part of a homeless family, but rather that their higher rate of homelessness is caused by being more likely to be evicted or run away.

A 2008 study using in-person interviews found that among youth who experienced homelessness for more than six months, lesbian, gay, and bisexual youth were more likely than heterosexual youth to report being verbally or physically harassed by family. In addition, LGBTQ youth are more likely to be homeless due to physical or sexual abuse experienced at home. In 2013, the Hetrick-Martin Institute showed that among homeless queer girls aged 13–15 in New York City, 50% of them were homeless because they were fleeing familial corrective rape.

In the background of both these explanations is the fact that, since the family conflicts associated with LGBTQ youth occur relatively late in a youth's development, LGBTQ youth are much less likely to be placed in foster care. Those who are placed in a foster home find an unwelcoming or hostile environment. A 1994 study on the New York City Child Welfare System reported that 78% of LGBTQ youth were kicked out or ran away from their foster home as a result. Many other factors that lead to increased risk of homelessness in adolescents disproportionately affect LGBTQ youth, such as experiencing conflict at school.

== Comparison to heterosexual counterparts ==
A large body of research details the differences in experiences between LGBTQ homeless youth and their heterosexual counterparts.

=== Victimization ===
Homeless youth in the United States who identify as LGBTQ are more likely to be victims of crime than heterosexual homeless youth. For example, a 2002 study using structured interviews of homeless youth in the Seattle area found that male LGBTQ youth were more often sexually victimized while homeless than non-LGBTQ male youth. A 2004 study using interviews of homeless youth in eight midwestern cities determined that lesbian adolescents experiencing homelessness were more likely to report physical victimization than their heterosexual female counterparts.

=== Sexual behavior and health ===
LGBTQ homeless youth are more likely to engage in survival sex or prostitution as a last resort to meet basic needs. In particular, in a 2012 study, legal expert Nusrat Ventimiglia noted that participation in the sex industry, homelessness, and lack of social support are particularly high among transgender women. A 2008 study that used interviews of homeless youth who use substances in the Southwestern United States determined a significant correlation between survival sex and HIV risk. A Seattle area 2002 study found that LGBT youth reported more lifetime sexual partners than their heterosexual counterparts, with double the number of LGBT youth reporting not using protection during sex 'all of the time.'

=== Substance use ===
Some research shows that LGBTQ homeless youth may be more likely to recreationally use substances than their heterosexual counterparts. For example, a 2002 study using structured interviews of homeless youth in the Seattle area found that in the prior six months, sexual minority youth had used each tested substance (including marijuana, cocaine/crack, acid, ecstasy, and several others) more frequently than heterosexual youth. That being said, a 2008 study that used interviews of homeless youth who used substances in the Southwestern United States found no significant difference in drug use between heterosexual and gay, lesbian, and transgender youth within its sample.

=== Mental health ===
Homeless youth who identify as LGBTQ are more likely than non-LGBT homeless youth to experience clinical depression or depressive symptoms as well as other mental health problems. A 2006 study using survey data of homeless lesbian, gay, and bisexual youth in eight cities found that 62 percent of lesbian, gay and bisexual homeless youth had attempted suicide, compared to 29 percent of non-lesbian, gay or bisexual youth. LGBTQ youth are 8.4 more times likely to attempt suicide if they are rejected by their family as a teen than if they are not rejected.

In particular, a 2004 study based on interviews of homeless youth in the urban Midwest indicated that lesbian youth were more like than heterosexual females to show signs of post-traumatic stress disorder, suicidal ideation and attempts, and among gay, lesbian and heterosexual youth, lesbian adolescents were more likely to report caretaker and street victimization as well as mental health problems.

=== Emergency housing access ===
In 2012, LGBTQ homeless youth experienced limited access to emergency housing options that affirm their sexual orientation and/or gender identity. According to a 2008 Note for the Family Court Review recommending policies regarding such housing options, as many as fifty percent of LGBTQ youth in emergency housing programs may be physically assaulted, a proportion further exacerbated at large shelters that house two hundred or more youth. In addition, a homeless youth emergency housing program's religious affiliation may lead to the denial of services to LGBTQ youth or the sending of youth to sexual orientation conversion therapy.

== Response ==
=== Federal policy ===
In 2020, the government spent $4.2 billion annually on homeless assistance programs, but less than 5% of this funding ($195 million) is allocated for homeless children and youth. A fraction of that is for unaccompanied homeless youth. Furthermore, in 2006, the United States Interagency Council on Homelessness acknowledged that LGBTQ youth are at a 120% greater risk of homelessness than heterosexual youth, and that they are more vulnerable to negative health conditions, exploitation, and human trafficking. In 2014, there were no federal programs or policies designed to specifically meet the needs of or protect LGBTQ homeless youth in the United States.

There are concerns about discrimination against directing funding toward homeless LGBTQ youth. Federal funds are allocated to organizations that provide shelter and services to homeless youth in the United States through two major programs: The Runaway and Homeless Youth Act (RHYA), first implemented in 1974 as the Runaway Youth Act and reauthorized multiple times since then, and the McKinney-Vento Homeless Assistance Act. According to the Center for American Progress in 2010, there are no mandates that the federal funds from these programs be provided to shelters that do not discriminate against LGBTQ youth. This means that some funding is given to organizations with explicitly anti-gay or anti-transgender policies. This can lead to denial of care, youth being afraid to access services, or youth being sent to sexual orientation conversion therapy.

Experts argue that policymakers are complacent regarding the specific problem of homeless LGBTQ youth. Runaway Youth Act programs are severely underfunded and are only able to provide services to a small portion of youth experiencing homelessness; and yet the Office of Management and Budget's 2006 rates these programs as 'effective', which is the highest rating possible. Federal responses remain focused on addressing gaps in research and data, such as questions determining factors of entry and exit to homelessness, impacts of homelessness on life outcomes, and effective ways to specify services and housing for homeless youth.

As there are a disproportionate number of LGBTQ homeless youth, there needs to be an equivalent focus from researchers on addressing questions and issues specific to LGBTQ homeless youth. Chaplin Hall and the Voices of Youth Count conducted relevant research in 2018 and formulated recommendations and solutions to gaps in research for policymakers to utilize.

=== Advocacy ===
Many individuals and organizations, including the Center for American Progress and the National Gay and Lesbian Task Force, advocate for change to institutional policies regarding homelessness among LGBTQ youth in the United States. The goals and visions of these activists include:

- Federally mandating that organizations receiving federal funding do not discriminate against LGBTQ youth
- Mandating LGBTQ-specific training for homeless youth service providers
- Establishing anti-discrimination policies among all relevant federal agencies for LGBTQ youth
- Creating a federal "healthy families" program that provides counseling to families with LGBTQ children
- Working to eliminate bullying of LGBTQ students in schools
- Increasing federal research on this issue
- The establishing of shelters and programs specifically serving LGBTQ homeless youth
- In shelters and programs for homeless youth, using intake forms that allow but do not require youths to identify their sexual orientation and gender identity, as well as ensuring the forms do not make assumptions about the youth's sexual orientation or gender identity.
- Placing occupancy caps on homeless shelters to reduce violence
- Ensuring that LGBTQ youth are not placed with another youth that is overtly hostile or demeaning of LGBTQ individuals.
- Establishing private shower facilities in shelters
- Segregating genders in a shelter by self-identified gender, rather than genitalia
- For those shelters requiring dress codes, making such codes gender-neutral

=== Non-profits ===
In 2014, there were less than a dozen nonprofit organizations in the nation that focused on providing LGBTQ homeless youth specialized services, and most of them are on the coasts. In a 2012 web-based survey of homeless youth organizations, 94% of respondents reported serving LGBT homeless youth within the past year. Funding was the most common factor cited as an obstacle to combating homelessness among LGBT youth.

Prominent shelters specifically for LGBTQ homeless youth include the Ali Forney Center in New York, named after an African-American transgender teenager who experienced homelessness and was murdered in 1997, and the Ruth Ellis Center in Detroit.

== See also ==
- Violence against LGBTQ people in the United States
- Suicide among LGBTQ youth
- LGBT history in the United States
- Family estrangement
- Homelessness in the United States
- Social exclusion
