= San Diego Pride =

LGBT non-profit in San Diego, California

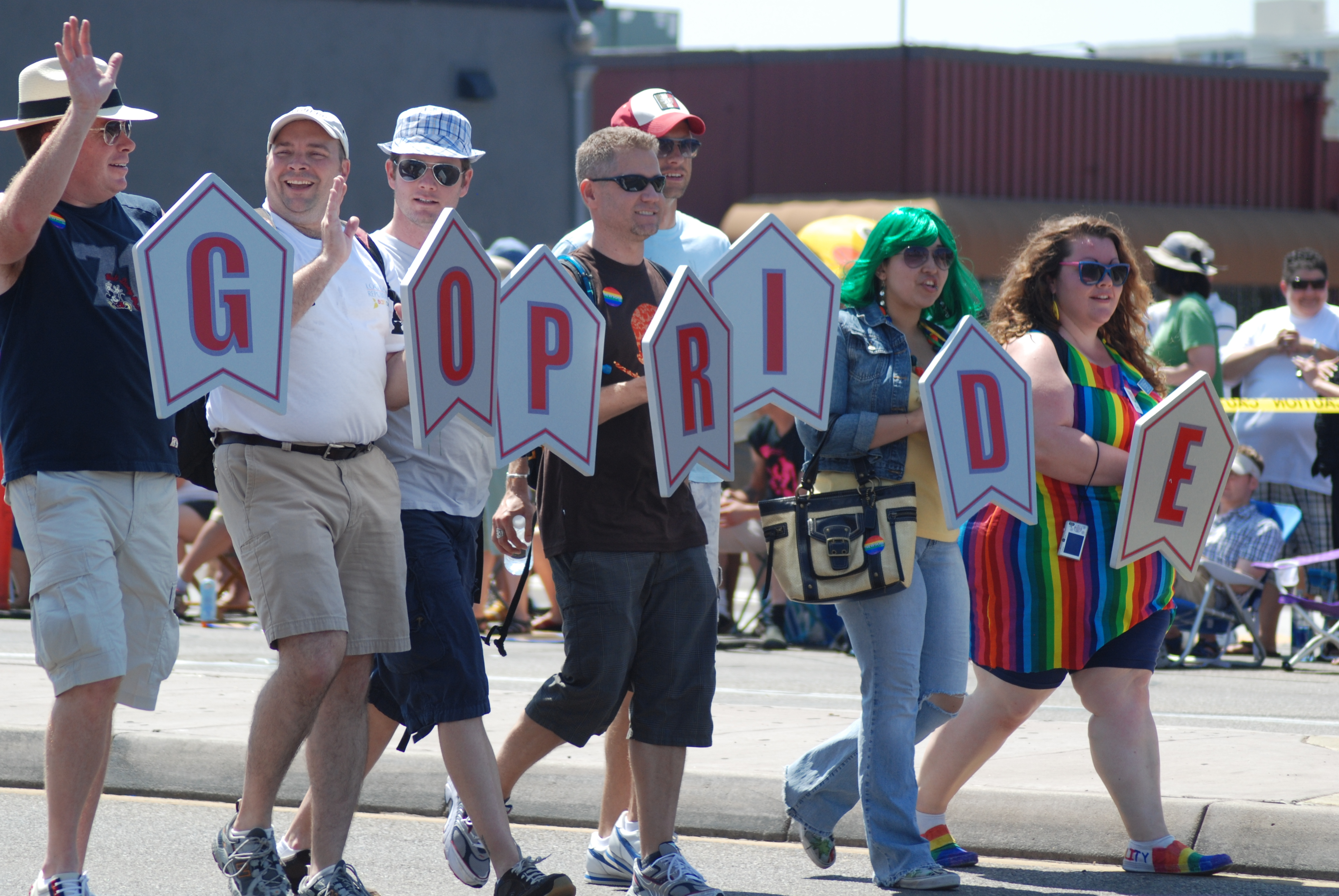
Marchers in the 2009 Pride Parade

San Diego Pride is a nonprofit organization based in San Diego, California. The organization operates various year-round programs, including an annual weeklong celebration every July, focusing on the LGBTQ community. The event features a pride parade on a Saturday, preceded by a block party and rally in the Hillcrest neighborhood the night before, and followed by a two-day pride festival on Saturday and Sunday in Balboa Park. Pride Week is believed to be the largest annual civic event in the city of San Diego. The parade has more than 300 floats and entries, and is viewed by a crowd of over 250,000 people.

== Mission and vision ==
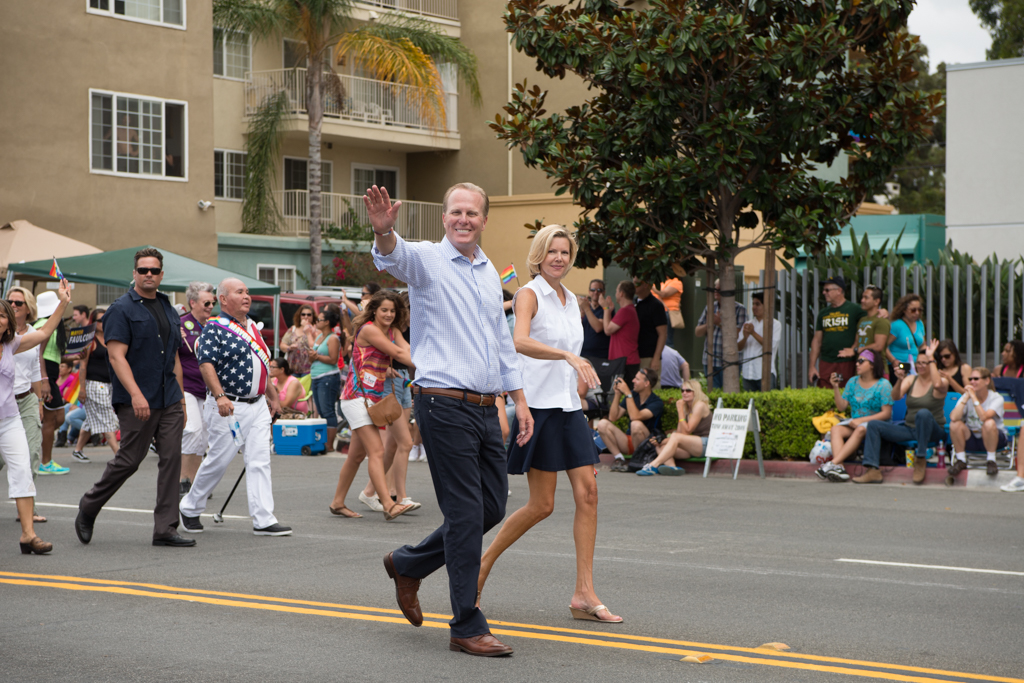
San Diego mayor Kevin Faulconer marches in the 2014 Pride Parade

The organization describes its mission as "fostering pride, equality, and respect for all lesbian, gay, bisexual, and transgender communities locally, nationally, and globally" and its vision as "a world free of prejudice and bias".

== History ==
=== Origins ===
In 1970, the gay and lesbian community in San Diego organized a “Gay-in”, potlucks, community groups, and other gatherings. A community hotline was the catalyst for organizing and fundraising to create comprehensive services and in 1973 the Center for Social Services opened in a house at 2250 B Street. The Center became a social and political focus for the gay community known now as The San Diego LGBT Community Center. In June 1974 the Center hosted a gay pride event which included a yard sale and potluck dinner at the Center as well as an informal parade to Balboa Park and back. Marchers had to walk on the sidewalk since they had no city parade permit. In 1975 the community was able to secure permits for a rally and a 400-person march. The parade has been held almost every year since, despite organizational and financial problems, which were finally solved in 1989 with the formation of a permanent Pride organization with professional management.

=== 1980s ===
In 1986, organizers had difficulties getting insurance coverage for the parade and festival, but were able to resolve the issues by moving the festival onto private property and negotiating reduced coverage requirements from the City of San Diego for the parade.

=== 1990s ===
After the event was nearly rained out in June 1990, the Pride Festival was permanently moved from June to July to avoid San Diego's "June Gloom" weather pattern. In 1993 the parade was moved to its current route from Hillcrest along University Avenue and 6th Avenue to Balboa Park. San Diego Pride was incorporated in 1994.

In 1994, former mayor and current talk-show host Roger Hedgecock organized a group of protesters calling themselves "The Normal People". They applied to march in the Pride parade “in political disagreement to the homosexual agenda.” When rejected by the organizers of the parade, Hedgecock filed a lawsuit, arguing that their exclusion violated San Diego's "Human Dignity Ordinance." The Superior Court rejected their claim, arguing that their right to march was not protected under the ordinance, since the parade was a private event and the "Normal People" message was intended to interfere with the event.

=== 2000s ===
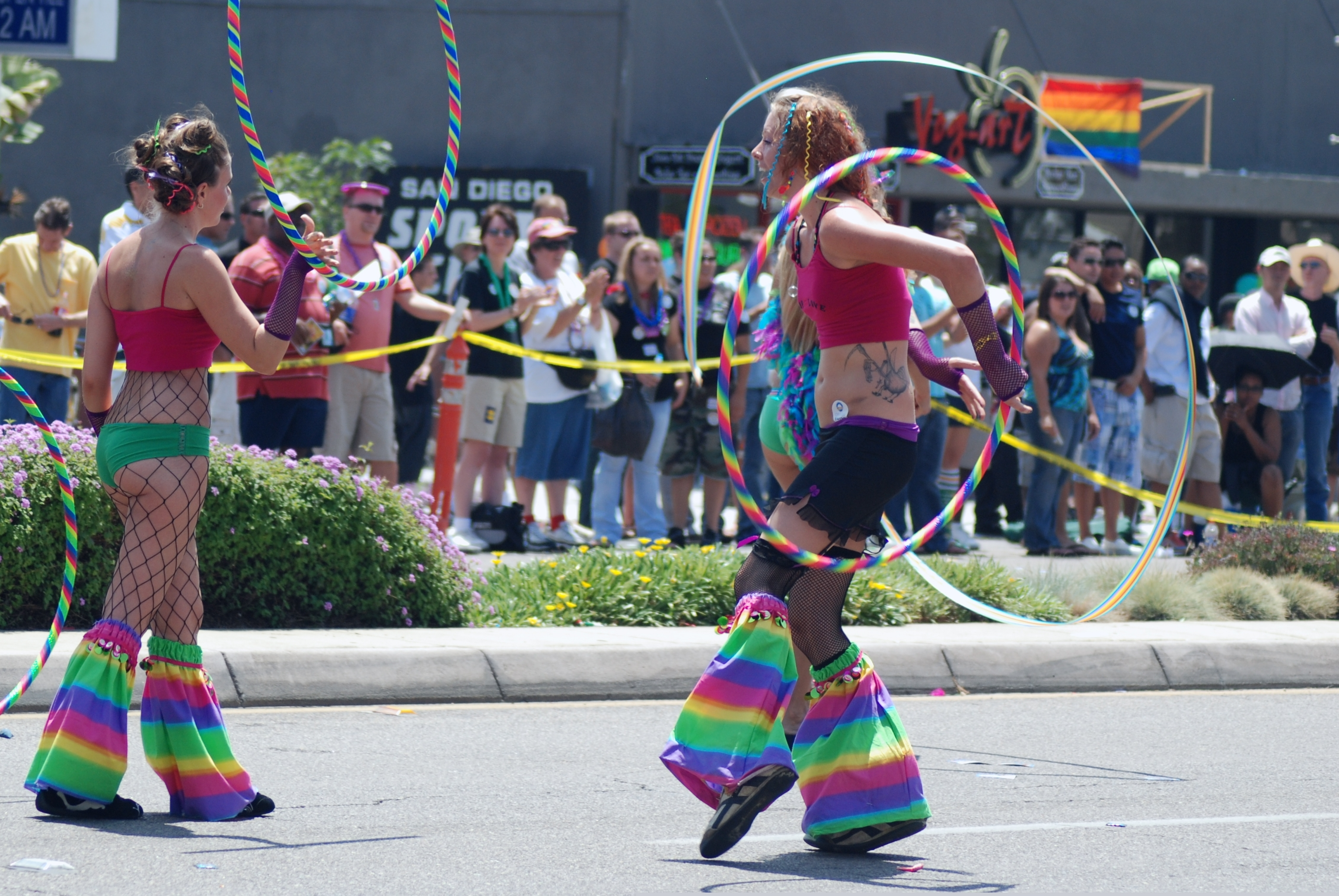
Performers at the 2008 parade

The 2001 San Diego Pride theme was "Diversity Creates Community" and featured the first official Pride program printed in both English and Spanish.

=== 2010s ===
In 2011, several hundred active and retired military service members marched in the parade, in anticipation of the imminent removal of the "Don't ask, don't tell" rule for U.S. military personnel. They did not wear military uniforms, but rather T-shirts with the name of their branch of service. This was the first time that active-duty American military personnel publicly marched in a gay pride parade.

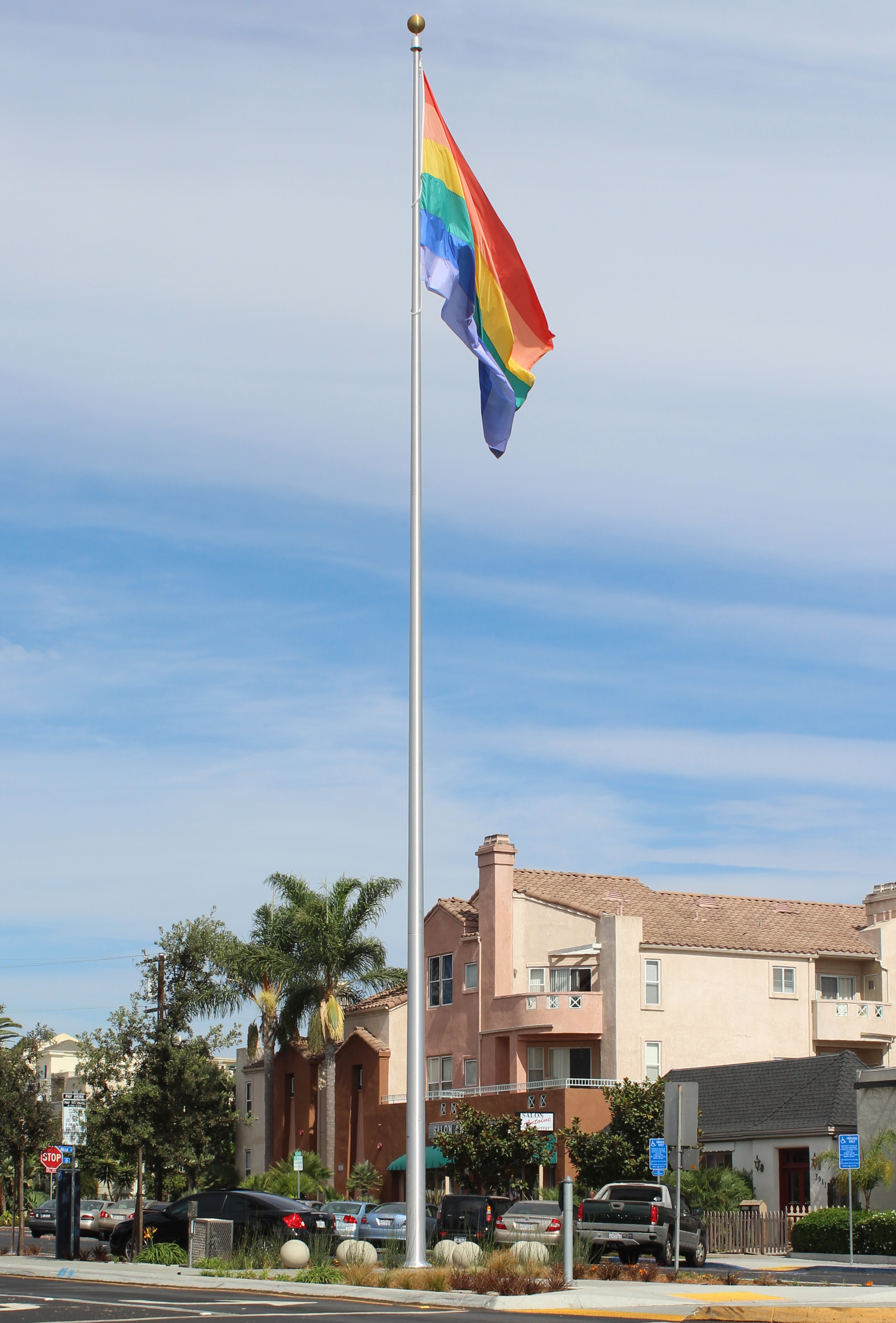
The Hillcrest Pride flag, erected in 2012

In 2012, the U.S. Department of Defense granted permission for military personnel to wear their uniforms while participating the San Diego Pride Parade. This was the first time that United States military personnel were permitted to wear their service uniforms in such a parade. The local Navy command had already approved the wearing of Navy uniforms, but the DOD decided to add their official stamp of approval "since the event has garnered national media attention." The Defense Department stressed that this was a one-time approval and applied only to this particular parade, based on their determination that the event was a non-political civic event. Military members are generally permitted to participate in parades if the parade is nonpolitical, patriotic in nature, and a civic event, but they need specific permission to wear their uniforms at such an event. The DOD directive stated, "Based on our current knowledge of the event and existing policies, we hereby are granting approval for servicemembers in uniform to participate in this year's parade, provided servicemembers participate in their personal capacity and ensure the adherence to military service standards of appearance and wear of the military uniform." Two Republican congressmen objected to the decision, saying that the parade was political in nature, but organizers said it was not political, pointing out that both of San Diego's mayoral candidates marched in the parade, even though one is a conservative Republican and the other is a liberal Democrat.

Also in 2012, the parade started from Harvey Milk Street, the first street in the nation to be named after gay civil rights icon Harvey Milk, and proceeded past a huge new rainbow flag, which was raised for the first time on July 20, 2012, to kick off the Pride festival. Both the street rename and the flag were unanimously approved by the City Council in May.

The 2013, festival featured an outdoor wedding chapel (couples arranged for their own officiants) in celebration of the overturning of California Proposition 8 the previous month. Grand marshals were La Toya Jackson and George Takei with his husband Brad.

In 2016, the organization was the subject of controversy as some community members were unhappy with the organization's actions, and demanded transparency. Specifically, they fired Executive Director Stephen Whitburn, a former San Diego City Council candidate. Subsequently, a group called Save SD Pride was formed as a response to a perceived lack of transparency. In December 2016 the groups had reached a deal to reform the organization by adding an advisory council, as well as consolidating into one group to focus on the 2017 Pride event.

=== 2020s ===
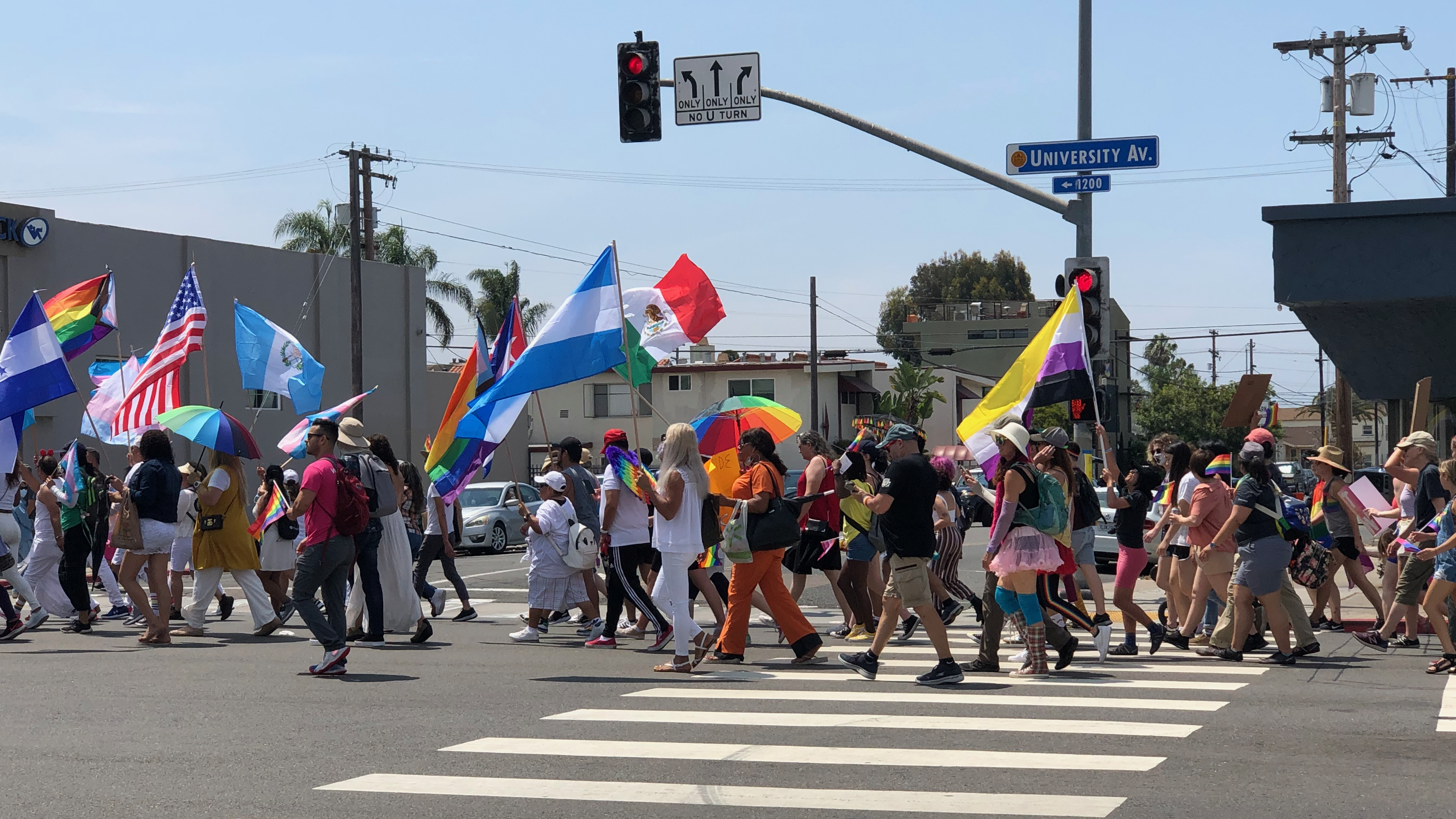
Marchers in the 2021 Resilient Community March

In 2020, the parade went virtual due to the impact of the COVID-19 pandemic. Essential workers were declared "community grand marshall." Adam Lambert, GiGi Goode and Margaret Cho shared messages of support.

In 2021, San Diego Pride went forward without the usual large parade and festival. In place of the parade, a "Resilient Community March" was staged from Balboa Park to the pride flag in Hillcrest, with an estimated attendance of at least 10,000 people.

July 2022 saw the return of the full-scale Pride events including She Fest, the parade, and two-day festival.

In July 2024, the San Diego Police Department rushed the installation of "smart streetlights" and automated license plate readers under the pretext that the Pride Parade and a recent rise in hate crimes established the exigent circumstances necessary to bypass usual oversight protocols. In December 2024, a lawsuit was filed against the SDPD for improperly deploying the surveillance systems at the parade and at Comic-Con without disclosing their locations or the nature of the alleged "exigent circumstances" in violation of the law.
