= The Mpowerment Project =

HIV prevention program

The Mpowerment Project

The Mpowerment Project is a model community building and HIV prevention program designed specifically to address the needs of young adult gay and bisexual men between the ages of ages 18 and 29. It is the first documented HIV prevention intervention for young gay/bisexual men to succeed in reducing sexual risk behavior. The program has been developed, evaluated, and continually refined by prominent behavioral scientists from the University of California, San Francisco's Center for AIDS Prevention Studies, the largest research center in the world dedicated to social, behavioral, and policy science approaches to HIV.

The Mpowerment project was one of the first programs to be included in the Centers for Disease Control and Prevention's Compendium of HIV Prevention Interventions with Evidence of Effectiveness designed specifically to address the HIV Prevention needs of young gay/bisexual men and other young men who have sex with men (MSM). The project uses outreach, a drop-in center, and community-building efforts to strengthen young gay men's self-esteem, positive relationships, and social support. By addressing HIV testing, PrEP, condom use, and staying on one's medications if one is living with HIV, its methodology addresses interpersonal and social factors that affect the lives of young gay/bisexual men.

== History ==
Eugene OR, logo 1993

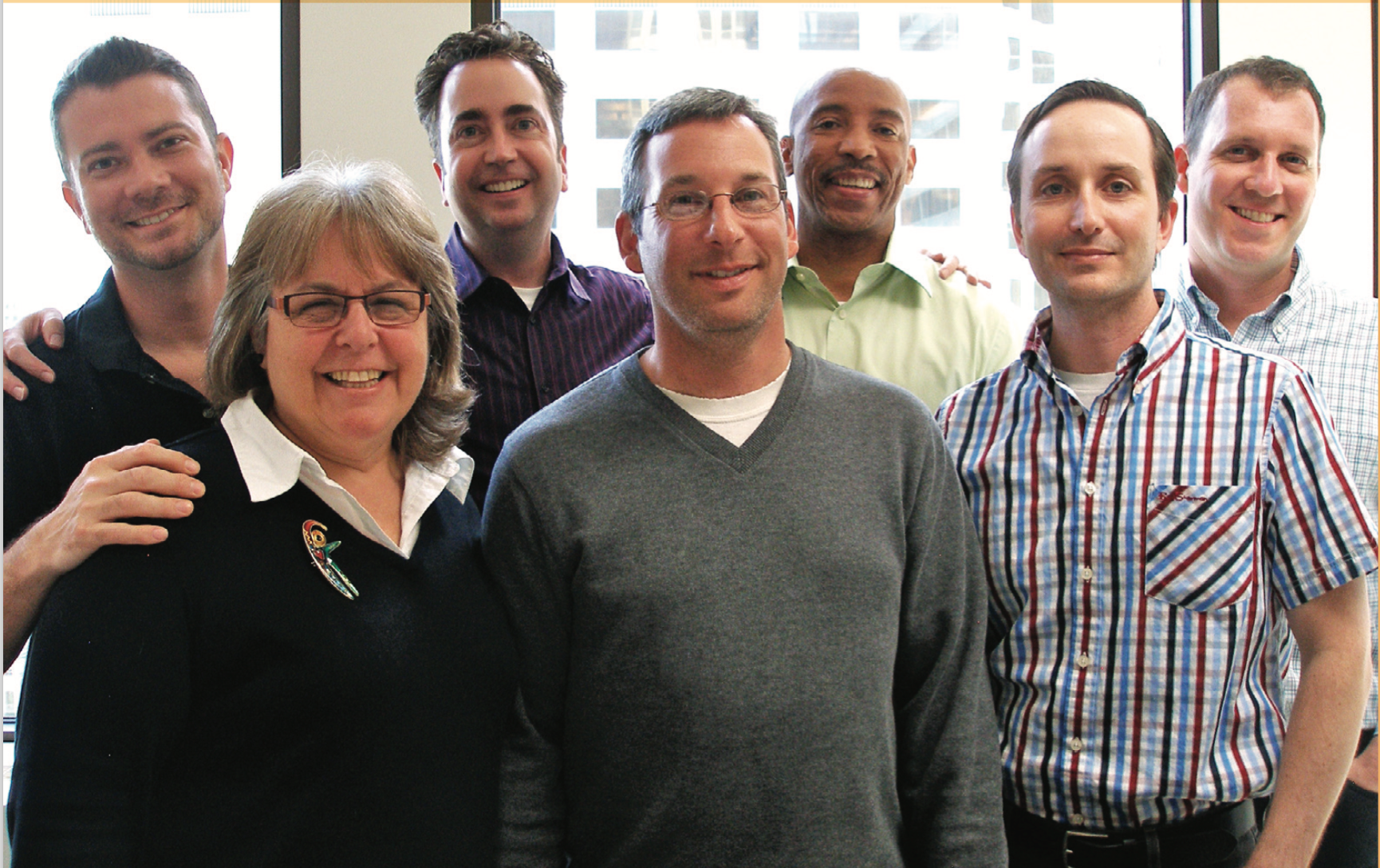
The Mpowerment Project Team (L to R) D.Sweeney, S. Kegeles, G. Rebchook, B. Zovod, R. Williams, J. Hamiga, S.Tebbetts

Recognizing the critical need for HIV prevention programs for young gay/bisexual men, Dr. Susan Kegeles and Dr. Robert Hays (1955-2001), research psychologists at the Center for AIDS Prevention Studies (CAPS) at the University of California, San Francisco, applied for funding to the National Institute of Mental Health (NIMH) to design, implement, and evaluate a community-level HIV prevention program for young gay/bisexual men. Their five-year grant was awarded in 1990.

The program was pilot tested in Santa Cruz, CA. Based on testing results, the program was refined refined the program and implemented it a second community (Eugene, OR), where it was named the Mpowerment Project. Following the program's success in Eugene, it was replicated in Santa Barbara, CA. In 1995, Drs. Kegeles and Hays received a second five-year grant from the NIMH to further develop the program for use in major metropolitan areas across the U.S. Dr. Greg Rebchook, a research psychologist who had worked at a department of public health and at a community-based organization, joined the team in 1996. This new grant enabled them to implement the Mpowerment Project in Albuquerque, NM – where the project was called MPower (1997–1998); and in Austin, TX – where the project was called Austin Men's Project / AMP (1999–2000). Since 2002, numerous organizations have implemented the program with varying success.

The Mpowerment Project is cost-effective compared with many other HIV prevention strategies. The cost per HIV infection prevented is far less than the lifetime medical costs of HIV disease. In 2005, the RAND Corporation developed a mathematical model of the cost of a wide variety of HIV prevention interventions. The Mpowerment Project is listed as the most cost-effective intervention.

== Project structure ==
The project is made of the Core Group, volunteers, and the Community Advisory Board (CAB). The Core Group consists of 10-15 members who represent the demographics of that particular project's local gay and bisexual men's community.

The Community Advisory Board (CAB) is available for the Core Group and volunteers. Consisting of members of the LGBT community, the CAB provide relevant advice for the Core Group and volunteers of GBT young adults.

== See also ==
- Advocates for Youth
- List of LGBT community centers
