= Pride Center of Vermont =

LGBTQ center in Vermont

- Former names: RU12? Community Center

General information
- Location: 255 S Champlain St #12, Burlington, Vermont, USA
- Coordinates: 44.47254611013123°N 73.21654945618313°W
- Opened: 1999

The Pride Center of Vermont, formerly the RU12? Community Center, was founded by two students at the University of Vermont and Middlebury College in 1999. The organization was run by volunteers until the first Executive Director was hired in 2002. RU12? (a play on the phrase, "Are you one too?") is the only non-profit organization mission-driven to serve lesbian, gay, bisexual, transgender, and queer (LGBTQ) Vermonters of all ages. The mission of the organization is to celebrate, educate, and advocate with and for LGBTQ Vermonters.

The center coordinates several programs, including the anti-violence program, SafeSpace, an HIV-prevention Mpowerment Project, GLAM, family programming, elders programming, the Trans* Community Wellness Project, and the "6 Degrees" social networks model HIV testing program. The Pride Center of Vermont is home to several peer-led social and support groups. The center also offers a free cyber center, community meeting space, lending library, drop-in resource center, free and anonymous HIV testing, and also houses the Vermont Queer Archives. The Pride Center of Vermont also created, manages, and maintains the Vermont Diversity Health Project, a free listing of LGBTQ-affirming and -knowledgeable medical and mental health providers around the state.

The Pride Center of Vermont is located at 255 S. Champlain Street in Burlington, Vermont.
