= LGBTQ community centre =

Regional community center for LGBT community

An LGBTQ community centre (American spelling: LGBTQ community center), or pride center (from gay pride), is a building which hosts services for non-heterosexual youth, seniors, adult men and women, and trans individuals, as well as an organization which owns and maintains such a building on a non-profit, non-political basis.

== Functions ==
Common focuses for LGBTQ community center activities include

- provision of material for people who are discovering their sexuality or gender identity
- provision of material and services for LGBTQ people who suffer from AIDS/HIV and other sexually-transmitted diseases
- hosting cultural events, including the beginnings of local pride parades, sporting events, and other cultural outings
- hosting fundraisers and drives for community empowerment and LGBTQ rights purposes
- hosting town hall meetings between LGBTQ residents of the area and important figures, i.e., politicians, businesspeople, religious leaders, activists, etc.
- serve as archives or museums for the LGBTQ history of a region

A number of LGBTQ community centers are youth-centric "drop-in" establishments, allowing usage or participation by young people aged 30 or lower.

== Geography and history ==
LGBTQ community centers are often the most visible LGBTQ institutions in high-density municipal areas where gay villages are not in effective establishment (e.g., in Israel, where municipal community centers are established without the presence of a high LGBTQ demographic concentration); as a result of such local visibility, LGBTQ community centers often have come under both verbal and violent attack from anti-LGBTQ individuals and groups.

Opened in 1970, the Pride Center of the Capital Region in Albany, New York is the oldest LGBTQ community center in the United States still operating from their original location. The LAGLC, was established in 1969 in Los Angeles, followed in close succession by other community centers in San Diego (1973), Chicago (1973), Salt Lake City (1975), and Atlanta (1976). The first LGBT community centre in the United Kingdom was the Birmingham Gay Community Centre which opened in 1976, with the London Lesbian and Gay Centre following in 1985. More were established in the coming decades in major cities throughout the Western world and Westernized countries due to the increasing visibility and respectability of LGBTQ cultures and society.

In a few countries, LGBTQ community centers and their operators have federated into voluntary organizations for coordination purposes, i.e. CenterLink and the French Federation of LGBT Centres.

== See also ==
- Gay village
- List of LGBTQ community centers in the United States
