= List of festivals in Michigan =

This is a list of festivals in Michigan.

Name	Start date (approximate)	City	Type	Status								
Alpenfest	July, 3rd week	Gaylord	Ethnic	Active								
Ann Arbor Art Fairs	July, 3rd week	Ann Arbor	Art	Active								
Ann Arbor Blues and Jazz Festival		Ann Arbor	Music	Inactive								
Ann Arbor Film Festival	March, 4th week	Ann Arbor	Film	Active								
Ann Arbor Summer Festival	June, 2nd week - July, 1st week	Ann Arbor	Summer	Active								
Appleumpkin Festival	October, 2nd week - October, 3rd week || Tecumseh || Fall || Active											
ArtPrize	September, 4th week - October, 2nd week	Grand Rapids	Art	Active								
African world festival	July, 3rd week	Detroit	Ethnic	Inactive								
Arts, Beats and Eats	August, 4th week	Royal Oak	Summer	Active								
Baby Food Festival	July, 3rd week	Fremont	Summer	Active								
Back to the Bricks	August, 2nd week	Flint	Car	Active								
Bay City Fireworks Festival	July, 4th	Bay City	Holiday	Active								
Beaver Island Music Festival	July, 3rd week	Beaver Island	Music	Active								
Blissfest Annual Festival	July, 2nd week	Harbor Springs	Music	Active								
Calhoun County Fair	August, 2nd week	Marshall	Fair	Active								
Capital City Film Festival	April, 2nd week	Lansing	Film	Active								
Celebration on the Grand	July, 4th	Grand Rapids	Holiday	Active								
Cheeseburger in Caseville	August, 2nd week - 3rd week	Caseville	Summer	Active								
Coast Guard Festival	August, 2nd week	Grand Haven	Honor	Active								
Common Ground Music Festival	July, 2nd week	Lansing	Music	Active								
Concert of Colors	July, 2nd week	Detroit	Music	Active								
Curwood Festival	June, 1st week	Owosso	Literary	Active								
Dally in the Alley	September, 1st week	Detroit	Community	Active								
Danish Festival	August, 2nd week	Greenville	Ethnic	Active								
Dam Jam Music Festival	July, 1st week	Calumet	Summer	Active								
Dearborn Homecoming Festival	August, 1st week	Dearborn	Summer	Active								
Detroit Electronic Music Festival	May, 4th week	Detroit	Music	Active								
Detroit Festival of the Arts		Detroit	Art	Inactive								
Detroit International Jazz Festival	August, 4th week	Detroit	Music	Active								
Detroit River Days	June, 4th week	Detroit	Summer	Active								
Detroit Windsor International Film Festival		Detroit / Windsor, Ontario	Film	Inactive								
Eastern Michigan State Fair	Late July - Early August	Imlay City	Fair	Active								
East Lansing Film Festival	November, 1st week	East Lansing	Film	Active								
Electric Forest	June, 4th week	Rothbury	Music	Active								
En Gedi Christian Music Festival	July, 4th week	Leonidas	Music	Active								
Greater Farmington Film Festival	March, 1st week	Farmington	Film	Active								
Festival of the Arts	June, 1st week	Grand Rapids	Art	Inactive								
Fresh Coast Film Festival	October	Marquette	Film	Active								
Traverse City Fresh Coast Film Festival	May	Traverse City	Film	Active	Grand Rapids Comic Con	November, 2nd week	GrandRapids	Film	Active	Music	Art	Literary
Hell's Half Mile Film & Music Festival	September, 4th week	Bay City	Film	Active								
Hiawatha Music Festival	July, 3rd week	Marquette	Music	Active								
Hotter than July	July, 3rd week	Detroit	LGBT	Active								
Howell Melon Festival	August, 3rd week	Howell	Food	Active								
JAFAX	June, 4th week	Grand Rapids	Anime	Active								
Lansing JazzFest	August, 1st week	Lansing	Music	Active								
Leonard Strawberry Festival	July, 2nd or 3rd week	Leonard	Food	Active								
Lilac Festival	June, 2nd week	Mackinac Island	Flower	Active								
Marshall Bluegrass Festival	July, 4th week	Marshall	Music	Active								
Michigan Challenge Balloonfest	June, 4th week	Howell	Balloon	Active								
Michigan ElvisFest	July, 2nd week	Ypsilanti	Music	Active								
Michigan Festival of Sacred Music	November, 2nd week, odd years	Kalamazoo	Music	Active								
Michigan Lavender Festival	June 6–8	Imlay City, Michigan	Flower	Active								
Michigan Pride	August, 4th week	Lansing	LGBT	Active								
Michigan Renaissance Festival	August, 3rd week - September, 4th week weekends / Labor Day	Holly	Renaissance	Active								
Michigan Sugar Festival	June, 2nd week	Sebewaing	Food	Active								
Michigan Technological University's Winter Carnival	February, 2nd week	Houghton	Winter	Active								
Michigan Womyn's Music Festival	August, 1st week	Hart	Women's	Active								
Michigan Youth Arts Festival	May, 2nd week	Kalamazoo	Art	Active								
Mo Pop Festival	July, 4th week	Detroit	Music	Active								
Monroe County Fair	July, last week - August, 1st week	Monroe	Fair	Active								
Motor City Pride	June, 2nd week	Detroit	LGBT	Active								
National Cherry Festival	July, 2nd week	Traverse City	Food	Active								
National Strawberry Festival	June, 3rd week	Belleville	Food	Active								
National Trout Festival	April, 4th week	Kalkaska	Fish	Active								
Noel Night	December, 1st week	Detroit	Holiday	Active								
Old Town BluesFest	September, 3rd week	Lansing	Music	Active								
Pine Mountain Music Festival	July, 4th week - August, 1st week	western Upper Peninsula	Music	Active								
Porcupine Mountains Music Festival	August, 4th week	Ontonagon	Music	Active								
Posen Potato Festival	September, 1st week	Posen	Food	Active								
Pulaski Days	October, 1st week	Grand Rapids	Ethnic	Active								
Racin and Rockin		Springport	Music	Inactive								
Red Flannel Festival	1st Saturday in October	Cedar Springs	Fall	Active								
South Haven Blueberry Festival	August, 2nd week	South Haven	Food	Active								
Stars & Stripes Festival	June, 4th week	Sterling Heights	Music	Active								
Sterlingfest	July, 4th week	Sterling Heights	Summer	Active								
Things That Go Bump In The Night Film Fest (Bump Fest)	October	Bay City	Film	Active								
Threadbare Mitten Film Festival	June 23 & 24	Charlotte	Film	Active								
Traverse City Film Festival	July	Traverse City	Film	Inactive								
Traverse City Microbrew & Music Festival	August, 2nd week	Traverse City	Music&Craft Beer	Inactive								
Traverse City Comedy Fest	April	Traverse City	Comedy	Active								
Tulip Time Festival	May, 1st week	Holland	Flower	Active								
Unity Christian Music Festival	August, 2nd week	Muskegon	Music	Active								
Upper Peninsula State Fair	August, 3rd week	Escanaba	Fair	Active								
Venetian Festival	July, 3rd week	Charlevoix	Summer	Active								
Waterfront Film Festival	June, 2nd week	South Haven	Film	Active								
Wayne County Fair	August, 2nd week	Belleville	Fair	Active								
Wheatland Music Festival	September, 1st week	Remus	Music	Active								
Michigan Irish Festival	September, 3rd weekend	Muskegon	Irish Music etc	Active								
Youmacon	November, 1st week	Detroit	Anime	Active								
Ypsilanti Heritage Festival	August, 3rd week	Ypsilanti	Heritage	Active								
90s Flannel Fest	August, 3rd weekend	Saginaw County	Music	Active								
