= Michigan Pride =

Annual LGBT event in Lansing, Michigan

- Michigan Pride's logo
- Genre: LGBT pride parade and festival
- Date: August
- Frequency: Annually
- Locations: Lansing, Michigan, United States of America
- Years active: 37
- Inaugurated: June 1989
- Most recent: August 23, 2014
- Attendance: 8,000 (2011)
- Website: www.michiganpride.org

Michigan Pride is an annual LGBT Pride festival and parade held in Lansing, Michigan every August. The event was held in June from 1990 until 2011.

== History ==
In 1986, Craig Covey and the Michigan Organization for Human Rights organized the Michigan Organization for Human Rights March, Michigan’s first gay and lesbian march in Detroit. From 1986-1988, the civil rights march took place down Woodward Avenue followed by a rally at Kennedy Square. A party took place at the McGregor Center on the campus of Wayne State University following the rally, organized by a small number of dedicated gay and lesbian groups and volunteers. In 1989, the Gay and Lesbian civil rights march was moved to the more central location of Lansing to attract statewide participation and political awareness as well as to celebrate the 20th anniversary of New York City’s Stonewall Riots.

The event moved from June to August in 2012.

== Activities ==
Michigan Pride includes a parade that concludes in front of the Michigan State Capitol, and a festival in Adado Riverfront Park. The event sometimes includes a White Party the night before the parade and festival.

A golf outing has been held annually since 2010.

== Notable performers and speakers ==
- God-Des and She (2012)
- Steve Grand (2015)
- Ross Mathews (2013)
- Dawn Robinson (2011)
- Mark Schauer (2014)
- Chris Willis (2012)

== See also ==
- Hotter than July (festival)
- Motor City Pride
