= Diamondback Music Hall =

Music venue located in Van Buren Township, Michigan

- Interactive map of Diamondback Music Hall
- Former names: Diamondback Saloon
- Location: 49345 South Interstate 94 Service Drive, Van Buren Township, Michigan
- Coordinates: 42.2179°N 83.5218°W
- Owner: Cory Nemeth

Construction
- Opened: 1985 (as the Diamondback Saloon); November 17, 2023 (as the Diamondback Music Hall)

Website
- www.diamondbackmusichall.com

The Diamondback Music Hall, formerly the Diamondback Saloon, is a concert venue and former country bar located in Van Buren Township, Michigan.

== History ==
The venue originally opened as the Diamondback Saloon in 1985 which originally was a country music venue and also hosted line dancing classes. On December 12, 2004, Border City Wrestling held the Night of Apperciation for Sabu professional wrestling event at the saloon. The event was a charity show held to raise funds for the medical bills for former Extreme Championship Wrestling professional wrestler Sabu and featured Shane Douglas fighting against Raven in the main event.

On December 3, 2017, Impact Wrestling and Border City Wrestling (BCW) taped the One Night Only: Canadian Clash pay-per-view at the venue during BCW's Motown Showdown event. The main event match of the taped portion of the card would be Laurel Van Ness fighting against Sienna. Impact Wrestling and Border City Wrestling would return to the Diamondback Saloon for a livestreamed Twitch special titled Motown Showdown on October 7, 2018 in which the main event match was between Johnny Nitro and Moose. On December 8, 2019, BCW and Impact returned to the venue for the final time to present the second and final Motown Showdown event in which the main event match would be Sami Callihan defending the Impact World Championship against Rhino in a street fight.

On December 20, 2022, venue owner Russ Connelly announced that the Diamondback Saloon would be shuttering on December 23, 2022 after deciding to sell the bar and retire with the new owner announcing plans to redevelop the bar into an event venue. On November 17, 2023, the venue reopened as the Diamondback Music Hall with the one of the first acts to play in the reopened venue being the Killer Flamingos rock band.

On June 12, 2024, Detroit-area radio station WRIF partnered up with the venue to host the 2024 edition of the Wednesday Night Bike Nights motorcycle rally in the parking lot of the venue. On the August 7, 2024 Wednesday Night Bike Nights event, Detroit Red Wings Right Winger Darren McCarty was featured as a special guest during the night.

On April 5, 2025, Majik Ninja Entertainment (MNE) held a special concert during the Astronomicon 8 convention at the venue which featured MNE owners Twiztid and MNE-signed rappers and hip-hop groups including Blaze Ya Dead Homie, Anybody Killa, The R.O.C., G-Mo Skee, and Insane E.

Beginning on September 26, 2026, the venue began holding tapings for Juggalo Championship Wrestling's (JCW) weekly streaming television show Lunacy.
