= 2020 Oakland County Executive election =

- November 3, 2020
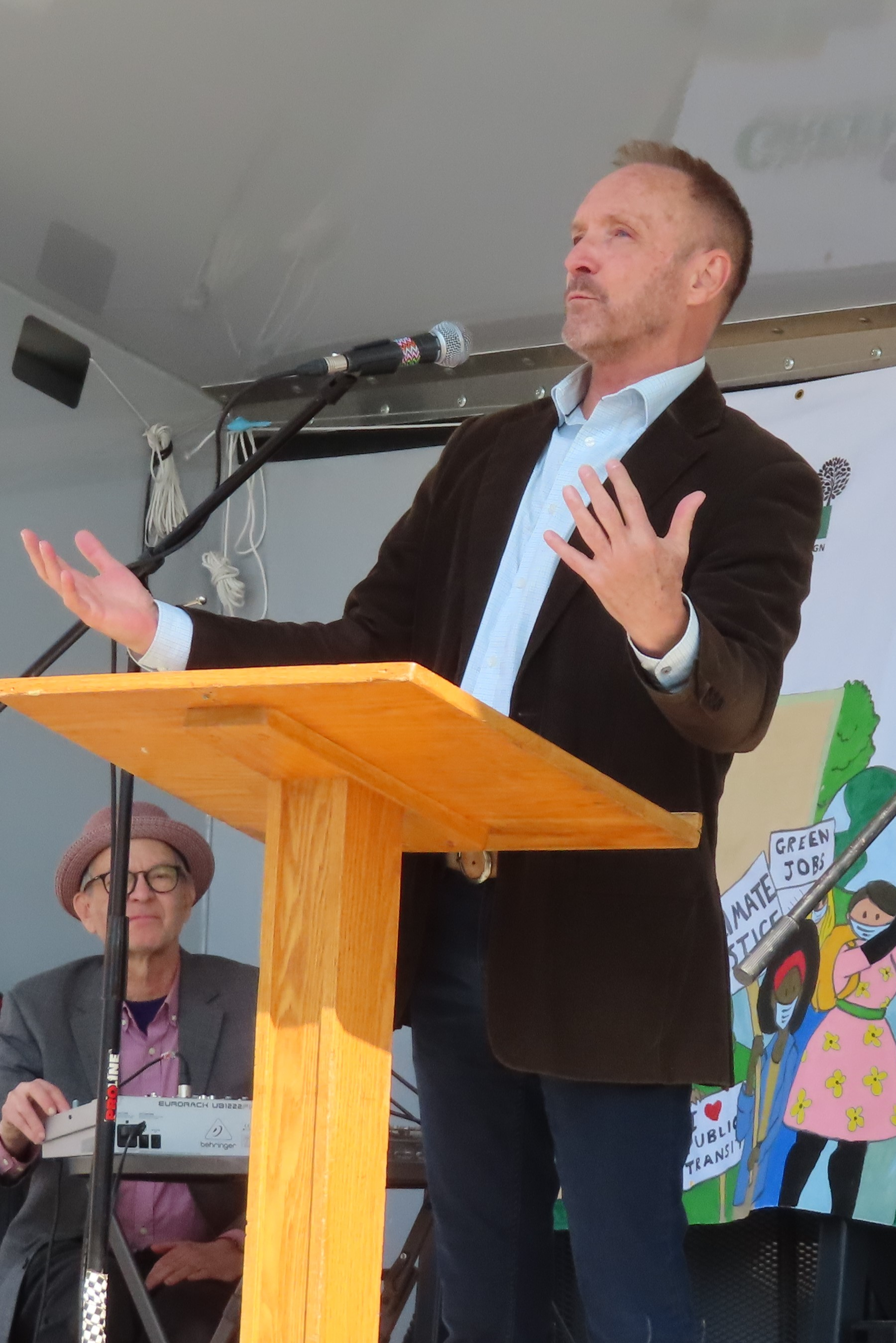

Nominee	David Coulter	Mike Kowall
Party	Democratic	Republican
Popular vote	403,863	321,803
Percentage	54.75%	43.62%
Oakland County Executive before election
David Coulter
Democratic
Elected Oakland County Executive
David Coulter
Democratic

The 2020 Oakland County Executive election was held on November 3, 2020. Long-time County Executive L. Brooks Patterson died on August 3, 2019, and Ferndale Mayor David Coulter, a Democrat, was appointed to serve out the remainder of Patterson's term. Two elections were held on the same day: one for the remaining two months of Patterson's term, and one for a full four-year term. Coulter defeated County Treasurer Andy Meisner in the Democratic primary and faced former State Senator Mike Kowall, the Republican nominee, in the general election. Coulter defeated Kowall by a wide margin, becoming the first Democrat to be elected County Executive.

== Democratic primary ==
=== Candidates ===
- David Coulter, incumbent County Executive
- Andy Meisner, Oakland County Treasurer

=== Regular primary results ===
Democratic primary results
Party	Candidate	Votes	%
Democratic	David Coulter (inc.)	109,761	53.96%
Democratic	Andy Meisner	93,475	45.95%
Democratic	Write-ins	178	0.09%
Total votes		203,414	100.00%

=== Special primary results ===
Democratic special primary results
Party	Candidate	Votes	%
Democratic	David Coulter (inc.)	112,679	56.02%
Democratic	Andy Meisner	88,256	43.87%
Democratic	Write-ins	219	0.11%
Total votes		201,154	100.00%

== Republican primary ==
=== Candidates ===
- Mike Kowall, former State Senator
- Jeffrey G. Nutt, Troy attorney

=== Regular primary results ===
Republican primary results
Party	Candidate	Votes	%
Republican	Mike Kowall	91,421	74.85%
Republican	Jeffrey G. Nutt	30,515	24.99%
Republican	Write-ins	197	0.16%
Total votes		122,133	100.00%

=== Special primary results ===
Republican primary results
Party	Candidate	Votes	%
Republican	Mike Kowall	88,612	73.69%
Republican	Jeffrey G. Nutt	31,452	26.16%
Republican	Write-ins	185	0.15%
Total votes		120,249	100.00%

== General election ==
=== Regular election results ===
2020 Oakland County Executive election
Party	Candidate	Votes	%
Democratic	David Coulter (inc.)	403,863	54.75%
Republican	Mike Kowall	321,803	43.62%
Libertarian	Connor Nepomuceno	11,441	1.55%
Write-in		569	0.08%
Total votes		737,676	100.00%
Democratic hold			

=== Special election results ===
2020 Oakland County Executive special election
Party	Candidate	Votes	%
Democratic	David Coulter (inc.)	406,933	55.82%
Republican	Mike Kowall	321,151	44.05%
Write-in		938	0.08%
Total votes		729,022	100.00%
Democratic hold			
