= LGBTQ culture in Metro Detroit =

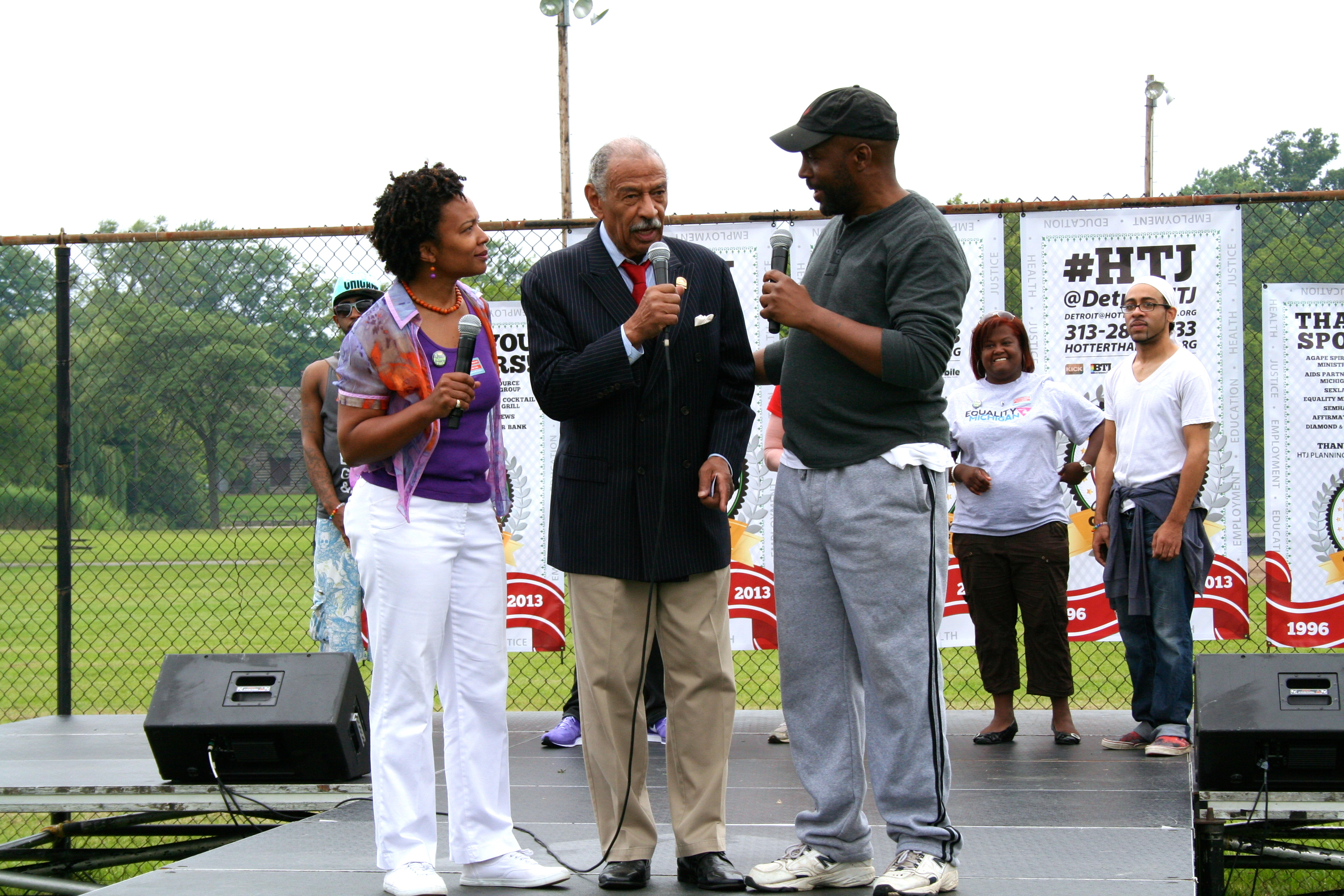
Congressman John Conyers (center) speaking on stage alongside Alicia Skillman (left) and Curtis Lipscomb (right) during Hotter Than July 2013 in Detroit's Palmer Park

Throughout Metro Detroit, there is a large lesbian, gay, bisexual, and transgender community. There are populations of gays and lesbians in some Detroit neighborhoods such as East English Village, Indian Village, Lafayette Park, and Woodbridge and that the concentration of gay bars in Detroit is "decentralized".

== History ==
Before World War II, Downtown Detroit served as the center of the LGBT community. It later shifted to New Center. Around the 1970s, the gay community in Detroit was centered in Palmer Park. Due to crime occurring around Palmer Park in the 1980s, the LGBT community moved to Ferndale. Wendy Case of Metro Times said, "Ask three different people what happened to Palmer Park and you'll get three different answers. But all will eventually agree that crime is what dismantled Detroit's opportunity to have a gay renaissance akin to those of San Francisco and New York."

Craig Covey, who later became a member of the city council and mayor of Ferndale, said that most of the former gay residents of Palmer Park "tended to move up Woodward Avenue and they settled in Ferndale, Royal Oak and Birmingham depending on their economic abilities. The middle-class folks came to Ferndale and Pleasant Ridge, as I did."

Ferndale received the LGBT community because housing prices were higher in Royal Oak and typically LGBT communities move into lower priced neighborhoods which are then revitalized. A law against discriminating against homosexuals was enacted by the City of Ferndale. Covey first ran for a city council in the City of Ferndale in 1995. He won a city council seat in Ferndale in 1999 and later became Mayor of Ferndale. In 2003, the Farbman Group, a real estate company renovating loft apartments in Detroit, began advertising to lesbians and gay men in an effort to get them to move into the complexes.

By 2022, there were more tensions between the Muslim and LGBTQ voting groups in Dearborn and Hamtramck in regards to LGBTQ materials in schools. This was a political shift, in which Christian groups now courted Muslim groups which they previously opposed, in order to get more voters for politically conservative causes. On June 13, 2023, the Hamtramck City Council introduced a resolution prohibiting the display of flags representing "any religious, ethnic, racial, political, or sexual orientation group" on city property, which was widely considered a targeted ban on the rainbow flag. Following three hours of public comment, the Council passed the resolution unanimously. Current mayor Amer Ghalib opposed displaying the pride flag, while former Mayor Karen Majewski had supported displaying the LGBT pride flag.

== Institutions ==
LGBT Detroit (formerly KICK) is an organization that serves LGBT African-Americans.

The Gay Liberation Front had a chapter in Detroit.

Affirmations, Michigan's largest LGBTQ community center, is located in Ferndale and is one of the 10 largest LGBTQ community centers in the country. The organization hosts a 15,000 square foot community space, art gallery, educational programming, health and wellness programming, cafe, youth center, library, and a resource desk. General Motors, Ford and Stellantis have been major donors to Affirmations throughout the years.

The Ruth Ellis Center is a non-profit organization located in Highland Park that provides short and long-term residential safe space and support services for runaway, homeless, and at-risk lesbian, gay, bi-attractional, transgender, and questioning youth.

Many of the local universities, including Wayne State University, Oakland University, Eastern Michigan University, and University of Michigan, have on-campus LGBT resource centers.

Equality Michigan (formerly the Triangle Foundation) is a statewide political advocacy organization located in Detroit working towards the LGBT community's social, cultural, political, and economic wellbeing.

SAGE Metro Detroit (formerly the LGBT Older Adult Coalition established in 2010) was established in 2015 "to build awareness and promote change so that LGBT older adults may age with dignity and authenticity".

The Detroit Regional LGBT Chamber of Commerce is located in Detroit and its mission is "to promote and empower our Metropolitan Detroit LGBT, allied business members, non-profit members, corporate partners and their employees through leadership, advocacy and education".

== Recreation ==
Motor City Pride is held annually in Detroit. Ferndale Pride is held in Ferndale. Motor City Pride moved from Royal Oak to Ferndale in 2001, and it was held in Ferndale until 2011, when it moved to Detroit. Ferndale Pride was started that year. The "Hotter Than July!" annual LGBT festival, catering to black LGBT people, is held in Palmer Park in Detroit.

In the 1940s, many gay men in Windsor, Ontario, went to Detroit, as it had several gay bars such as "Gay Paris". Some police officers in Windsor doing police work crossed the border and entered Detroit gay bars.

Ruth Ellis, a black lesbian, held house parties at her residence known as "The Spot". It became a socializing place for black lesbians and gay men, allowing them to avoid heterosexism and racism. Ellis, who was featured in the documentary Living With Pride, was the oldest known black woman who identified as a lesbian until October 2001, when she died. She lived in Detroit until her death.

== Media ==
The newspaper Between The Lines and the website PrideSource, published by Pride Source Media Group, LLC (PSMG), are headquartered in Livonia. The company opened in 1995. A collective named the Gay Liberator had formed itself from the Gay Community Center and the Detroit GLF; this collective published the Gay Liberator.

An LGBT film festival, Reel Pride Michigan, ran from 2002 through 2008 in Royal Oak. Hotter Than July has hosted a film festival since 2008 as part of their annual festivities. The film festival continued through at least 2016. In 2017, a film festival for queer filmmakers, Trans Stellar Film Festival, was founded.

== Education ==
In 2022, political controversies regarding LGBTQ materials in Dearborn Public Schools led to protests that advocated for removing certain books and counter-protests that advocated against districts removing such books. The district chose to discontinue holding seven titles. Much of the impetus for removing LGBTQ books was driven by conservative Muslim advocates, who were backed by conservative Christian advocates.

== Notable residents ==
Notable LGBT people who have resided in the Metro Detroit area include:

- Eve Beglarian (composer, Ann Arbor)
- Simone Bell (community organizer, Detroit)
- David Burtka (actor and chef, Dearborn)
- Mary Elizabeth Clark (activist, Pontiac)
- Lynn Conway (scientist, Ann Arbor)
- David Coulter (politician, Ferndale)
- Craig Covey (politician, Ferndale)
- Jerry DeGrieck (politician, Ann Arbor)
- Alex Dimitrov (poet, Detroit)
- Christopher Dyer (politician, Ann Arbor)
- Ruth Ellis (activist, Detroit)
- Feloni (rapper, Detroit)
- LZ Granderson (journalist, Detroit)
- Aaron Hamburger (writer, Detroit)
- Quentin Harris (music producer, remixer and DJ, Detroit)
- Angel Haze (rapper, Detroit)
- Mary Kay Henry (activist, Wayne County)
- James Leo Herlihy (writer and actor, Detroit)
- Holly Hughes (performance artist, Ann Arbor)
- Tom Hulce (actor and producer, Detroit)
- Chris Kolb (politician, Ann Arbor)
- Kathy Kozachenko (politician, Ann Arbor)
- Lawrence La Fountain-Stokes (author and performer, Ann Arbor)
- W. Dorr Legg (activist, Ann Arbor)
- Anita Lo (chef and restaurateur, Birmingham)
- Heather MacAllister (activist, Ann Arbor and Dearborn)
- Deirdre N. McCloskey (professor, Ann Arbor)
- Peter McWilliams (author, Detroit)
- Taylor Mead (writer and actor, Grosse Pointe)
- Holly Miranda (singer-songwriter, Detroit)
- Jeffrey Montgomery (activist, Detroit)
- Hank Plante (journalist, Detroit)
- Gayle Rubin (cultural anthropologist, Ann Arbor)
- Sara Ryan (writer, Ann Arbor)
- George Solomos (filmmaker and writer, Detroit)
- Lily Tomlin (actress, comedian, writer, and producer, Detroit)
- Jim Toy (activist, Ann Arbor)
- Michele Van Gorp (basketball player, Warren)
- Trent Vanegas (writer, Detroit)
- Nancy Wechsler (politician, Ann Arbor)
- Robert W. Wilson (hedge fund manager, philanthropist and art collector, Detroit)
- Aileen Wuornos (serial killer, Rochester)
