= Craig Covey =

American politician (born 1957)

Mayor of Ferndale, Michigan
- In office January 2008 – January 2011
- Preceded by: Robert Porter
- Succeeded by: David Coulter

Personal details
- Born: Columbus, Ohio, U.S.
- Party: Democratic
- Education: Ohio State University

Craig Covey (born 1957) is an American politician who served as Mayor of Ferndale, Michigan from 2008 to 2011. He was the second openly gay mayor elected in the state of Michigan. A Democrat, he resigned the office in 2010 to take a seat on the Oakland County Commission, where he served one term.

== Biography ==
Born in Columbus, Ohio, Covey was an activist, and executive director of Stonewall Union (now Stonewall Columbus) in the 1980s. He lived in Michigan after moving to the state to become executive director of the Michigan Organization for Human Rights in 1985 and lived in Ferndale from 1989 until 2017.

== Gay activism ==
Covey moved to Michigan from Ohio to head the Michigan Organization for Human Rights (now Equality Michigan) in 1985. He is credited with organizing Detroit's first Gay and Lesbian pride march, an event later known as Motor City Pride. He founded the Midwest AIDS Prevention Project. In 2001, he founded La Comunidad, a support group for gay Latino men in the metro Detroit area.

Covey was also CEO of the Midwest AIDS Prevention Project and Chief Operating Officer of the Michigan AIDS Coalition, the organization resulting from the merging of MAPP and the Michigan AIDS Fund in 2009. He left the Michigan AIDS Coalition the following year. He co-founded Ferndale Pride in 2011, when Motor City Pride moved from Ferndale to Detroit.

== Political career ==
Covey lost his first race for Ferndale City Council in 1995 by a wide margin, but was elected on his second try and served from 1999 to 2008. He was Ferndale's first gay city councilor. As a city council member, Covey introduced Ferndale's human rights ordinance in 2006, which was approved by voters in November of that year.

Ferndale's first gay mayor, he was elected on November 6, 2007, for a two-year term, succeeding three-term mayor Robert Porter, by defeating Tom Gagne 54% - 46%. He was re-elected unopposed in November 2009. In 2010, he ran for the Oakland County Commission, winning a three-way Democratic primary on August 3, 2010 and besting a Republican in the November general election. It would prove to be his last electoral victory.

After Republican redistricting, Covey faced fellow Democratic incumbent Commissioner Helaine Zack (D-Huntington Woods) in a primary election, which he lost on August 7, 2012, by 54% to 46%. In early 2013, he began working as a special assistant to Oakland County Water Resources Commissioner Jim Nash.

He ran again for mayor of Ferndale, Michigan, on November 5, 2013, challenging incumbent and former ally David Coulter, but was defeated. Covey unsuccessfully challenged incumbent Oakland County Sheriff Mike Bouchard in 2016. In 2020, he ran for Stark County (Ohio) Treasurer, but lost.

== See also ==
- LGBT community of Metro Detroit
