= 2024 Oakland County Executive election =

- November 5, 2024
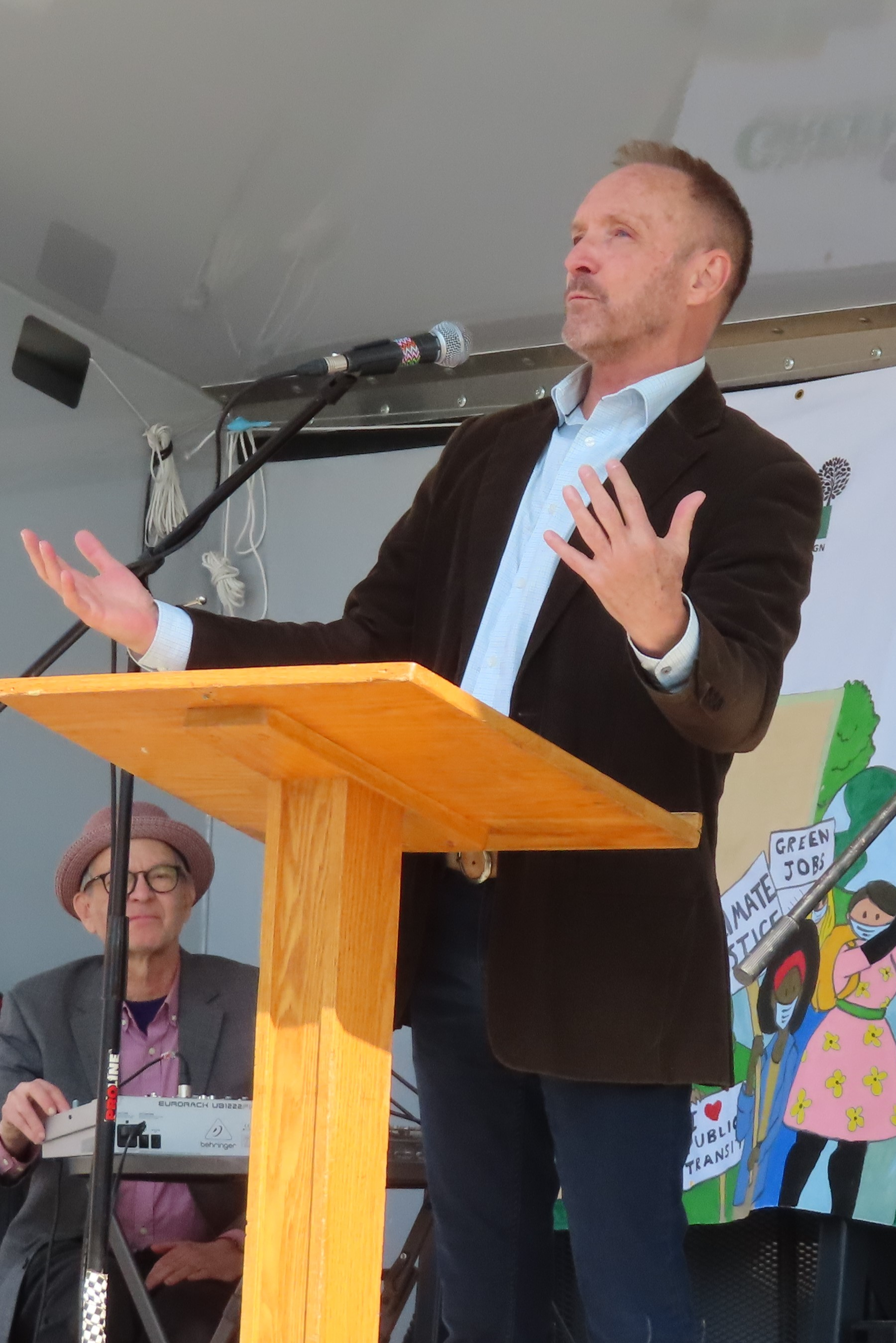

Nominee	David Coulter	Nik Gjonaj
Party	Democratic	Republican
Popular vote	417,133	317,620
Percentage	56.69%	43.17%
Oakland County Executive before election
David Coulter
Democratic
Elected Oakland County Executive
David Coulter
Democratic

The 2024 Oakland County Executive election was held on November 5, 2024. Incumbent County Executive David Coulter ran for re-election to a second full term. He was challenged by businessman Nik Gjonaj, the Republican nominee. Coulter defeated Gjonaj in a landslide, winning 57 percent of the vote.

== Democratic primary ==
=== Candidates ===
- David Coulter, incumbent County Executive

=== Primary results ===
Democratic primary results
Party	Candidate	Votes	%
Democratic	David Coulter (inc.)	133,131	99.76%
Democratic	Write-ins	315	0.24%
Total votes		133,446	100.00%

== Republican primary ==
=== Candidates ===
- Nik Gjonaj, businessman

=== Primary results ===
Republican primary results
Party	Candidate	Votes	%
Republican	Nik Gjonaj	72,823	99.60%
Republican	Write-ins	289	0.40%
Total votes		73,112	100.00%

== General election ==
=== Results ===
2024 Oakland County Executive election
Party	Candidate	Votes	%
Democratic	David Coulter (inc.)	417,133	56.69%
Republican	Nik Gjonaj	317,620	43.17%
Write-in		1,072	0.15%
Total votes		735,825	100.00%
Democratic hold			
