= Affirmations (Ferndale, Michigan) =

LGBT community center in Ferndale, Michigan

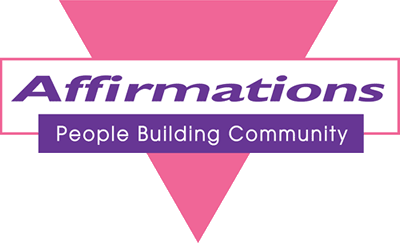
- Affirmations' logo
- Founded: 1989
- Type: 501c3
- Tax ID no.: 38-2882823
- Purpose: LGBTQ communities
- Location: Ferndale, Michigan
- Coordinates: 42.46079°N 83.13801°W
- Key people: Darrious D. Hilmon (executive director)
- Website: www.goaffirmations.org
- Formerly called: Affirmations Lesbian and Gay Community Center

Affirmations is a Michigan nonprofit community center serving the lesbian, gay, bisexual and transgender (LGBTQ) population of Ferndale, Michigan, and nearby communities.

== History ==
Affirmations was founded in 1989 as Affirmations Lesbian and Gay Community Center to serve LGBTQ people in Southeast Michigan. Affirmations was incorporated by Jeff Vitale and Laura Horowitz. The original by-laws were written by Jeff Vitale and Gary Roberts. Vitale and Roberts met when Roberts answered an ad Vitale placed in Metro Times for GLMPSE (Gays and Lesbians Mobilizing Politically, Socially and Economically) a short-lived organization also founded by Vitale. Vitale served as the founding president of Affirmations. He and Roberts assembled the first board of directors. Roberts served on the first board as vice president not president as reported by Between the Lines. Jan Stevenson became the second president when Vitale took a Market Research position in Chicago where he shortly thereafter founded Overlooked Opinions, the first market research and polling firm specializing in the lesbian and gay community in the United States. Jan Stevenson coined Affirmation's first motto "Gay is Good."

Originally, Affirmations was housed in a building owned by the Michigan Organization for Human Rights (MOHR), and was funded through community donations as well as a small grant that was obtained by one of MOHR's volunteers for a community hotline prior to Affirmation's formation. When MOHR questioned the need for a center such as Affirmations, the organization was moved to its second home, a Detroit building owned by inaugural board members Sue Pittmann and Christine Puckett. Around 1990, the center moved to the Pioneer Building on West 9 Mile Road in Ferndale. During the organization's first two years, a group of volunteers operated a coming out group and a support and referral hotline for LGBT people.

The center hired its first executive director, Jan Stevenson, an inaugural board member and later board president, in 1991, and expanded its programming to include hosting local LGBT groups and a program for local LGBT youth, funded by a US$150,000 (equivalent to $344,143 in 2025) gift from the estate of Carl Rippberger following his death. The center opened an art gallery in 1992 named after Pittmann and Puckett, who were murdered in May 1992 in an apparent hate crime by a neighbor. Stevenson resigned in 1995 to become publisher of Between the Lines. She was succeeded by Julie Enzer and Cindy Woodbury.

Leslie Thompson became executive director in 2000, expanded programming to include health services and civic engagement, and oversaw the construction and opening of a new building to house the center. Thompson resigned in August 2010, following two years of financial difficulties for the center.

In 2001, the center conducted a feasibility study on the possibility of constructing a new building to serve as its home. A capital campaign was launched in 2004 with a goal of US$5,300,000 (equivalent to $9,275,959 in 2025), and successfully completed in 2006, raising US$5,300,000, with support from Allan Gilmour, Ford Motor Company, Chrysler, and General Motors. On June 3, 2007, the center moved into its new facility on West 9 Mile Road in Ferndale.

Antonio David Garcia became executive director in August 2011, and he expanded recreation and advocacy efforts. The center coordinated a cross-state bike trip to raise awareness of LGBT issues and organized a statewide network of LGBT community centers. Garcia resigned in October 2013 and departed in February 2014. At the end of 2013, the organization received an anonymous bequest of US$800,000.

In March 2015, Darrious Hilmon became executive director. He resigned in October 2015 and was replaced in December 2015 by Susan Erspamer, who served until March 2018. Affirmations entered a period of restructuring after the departure of Susan Erspamer, leading to a new era for Affirmations. After being at the LA LGBT Center from his departure until 2019, Antonio David Garcia returned to the helm as executive director in May 2019.

== Activities ==
Affirmations offers services and multi-use facility space to the LGBTQ population in its surrounding communities. The center's services include counseling, support groups, get out the vote efforts, and a youth program, known as the Carl Rippberger Youth Empowerment Program, which provides a drop-in center and peer education program.

The organization is a member of CenterLink.

== Facility ==
The center operates out of a 17,000 square feet (1,600 m^{2}) facility on West 9 Mile Road in Ferndale. The facility was designed to be environmentally friendly and includes a cyber center, a two-story art gallery, an outdoor rooftop sky deck, and a library.

== See also ==
- LGBT history in Michigan
- List of LGBT community centers in the United States
