= Caseville Township, Michigan =

- Civil township
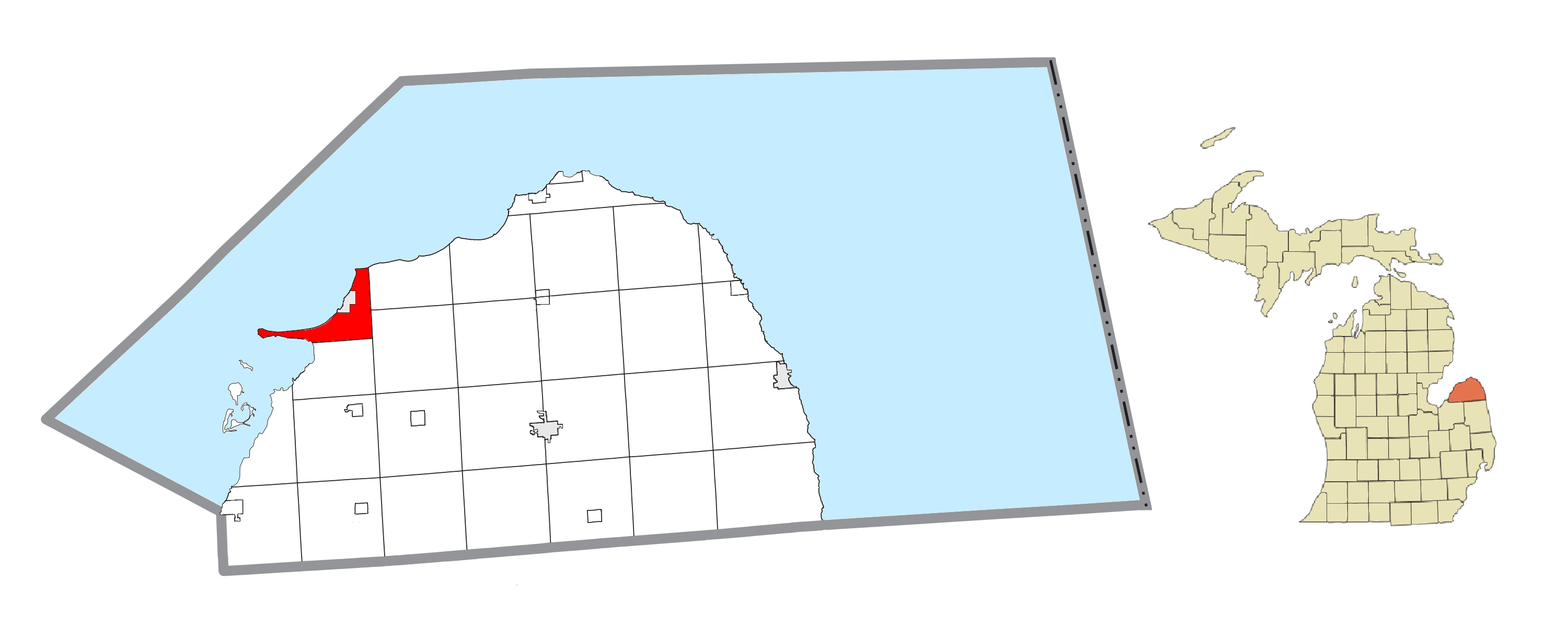
- Location within Huron County

- Location within the state of Michigan Caseville Township (the United States)
- Coordinates: 43°55′35″N 83°17′43″W
- Country: United States
- State: Michigan
- County: Huron

Government
  - Supervisor: Ben Willenberg

Area
  - Total: 14.2 sq mi (36.8 km^{2})
  - Land: 13.9 sq mi (36.1 km^{2})
  - Water: 0.27 sq mi (0.7 km^{2})
- Elevation: 604 ft (184 m)

Population (2020)
  - Total: 1,674
  - Density: 120/sq mi (46.4/km^{2})
- Time zone: UTC-5 (Eastern (EST))
  - Summer (DST): UTC-4 (EDT)
- ZIP code(s): 48725
- Area code: 989
- FIPS code: 26-13780
- GNIS feature ID: 1626041
- Website: Official website

Caseville Township is a civil township of Huron County in the U.S. state of Michigan. The population was 1,674 at the 2020 census.

The City of Caseville is within the township survey area on M-25 but is independent of the Township.

The township is small and irregularly shaped, consisting of only eight full sections and twelve partial sections. The township is at the opening of Saginaw Bay into Lake Huron and includes Sand Point, which forms the northern shore of Wild Fowl Bay.

== Geography ==
According to the United States Census Bureau, the township has a total area of 14.2 square miles (37 km^{2}), of which 13.9 square miles (36 km^{2}) is land and 0.3 square miles (0.78 km^{2}) (1.97%) is water.

== Demographics ==
As of the census of 2000, there were 2,723 people, 1,286 households, and 864 families residing in the township. The population density was 195.5 inhabitants per square mile (75.5/km^{2}). There were 2,614 housing units at an average density of 187.7 per square mile (72.5/km^{2}). The racial makeup of the township was 98.09% White, 0.33% African American, 0.22% Native American, 0.26% Asian, 0.07% Pacific Islander, 0.18% from other races, and 0.84% from two or more races. Hispanic or Latino of any race were 1.07% of the population.

There were 1,286 households, out of which 17.7% had children under the age of 18 living with them, 58.2% were married couples living together, 5.8% had a female householder with no husband present, and 32.8% were non-families. 29.0% of all households were made up of individuals, and 15.8% had someone living alone who was 65 years of age or older. The average household size was 2.10 and the average family size was 2.55.

In the township the population was spread out, with 16.7% under the age of 18, 4.3% from 18 to 24, 18.5% from 25 to 44, 32.1% from 45 to 64, and 28.4% who were 65 years of age or older. The median age was 52 years. For every 100 females, there were 99.5 males. For every 100 females age 18 and over, there 96 men.

The median income for a household in the township was $35,558, and the median income for a family was $42,284. Males had a median income of $32,875 versus $23,828 for females. The per capita income for the township was $24,128. About 5.4% of families and 8.6% of the population were below the poverty line, including 9.5% of those under age 18 and 9.8% of those age 65 or over.
