= LZ Granderson =

American journalist and former actor (born 1972)

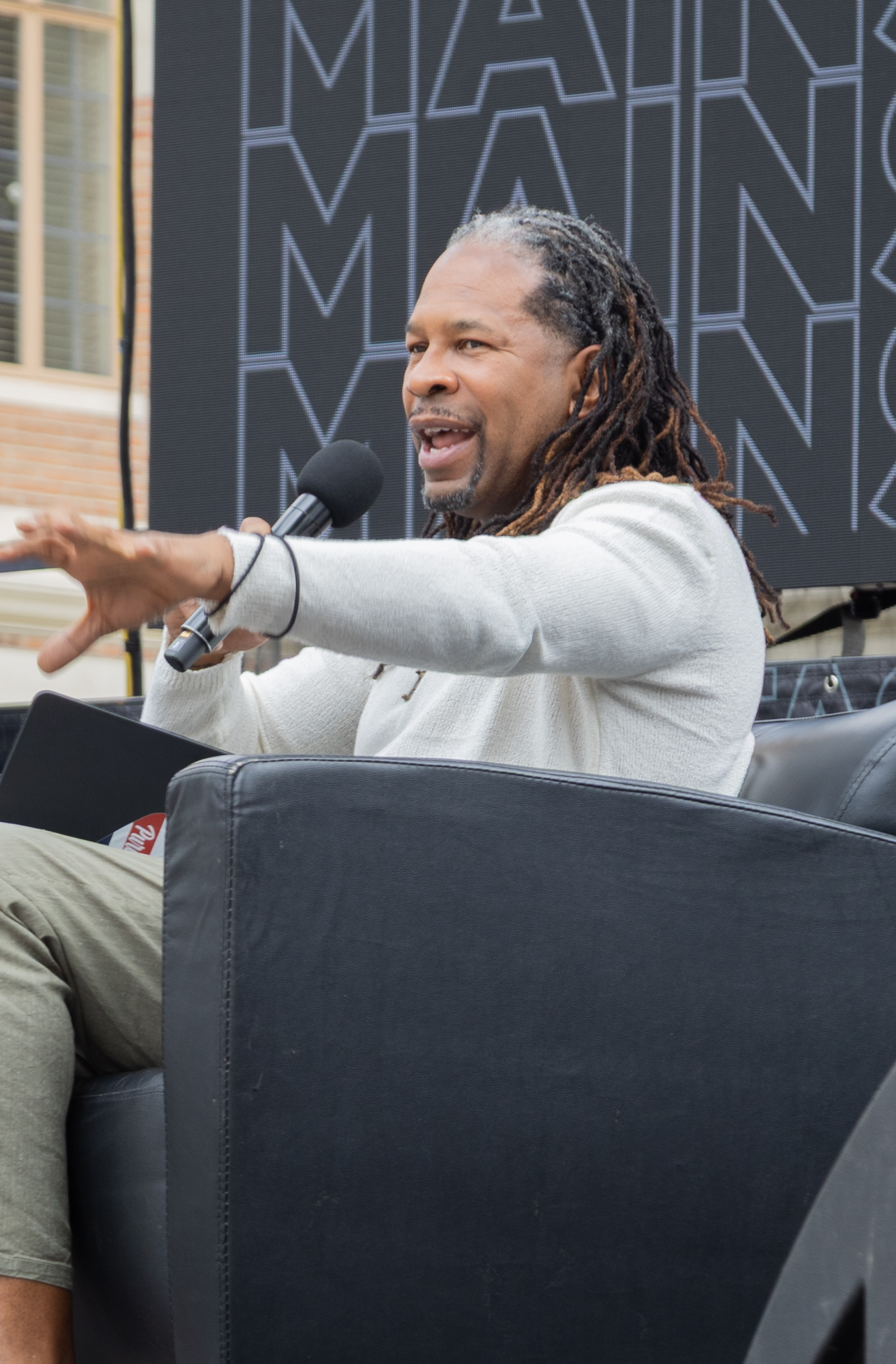
- Granderson in 2025
- Born: Elzie Lee Granderson; March 11, 1972 (age 54); Detroit, Michigan, U.S.
- Education: Western Michigan University
- Occupation: Columnist
- Spouse: Steve Huesing (m. 2016)
- Children: 1

Elzie Lee "LZ" Granderson (born March 11, 1972) is an American journalist and former actor, currently writing for the Los Angeles Times as a sports and culture columnist. He was a senior writer and columnist for ESPN The Magazine, a co-host of SportsNation on ESPN, afternoon co-host at ESPN LA 710 and a columnist for CNN. Granderson was named the Los Angeles Times Sports and Culture Columnist in January 2019.

Granderson has contributed to the channel's SportsCenter, Outside the Lines, Around the Horn, and ESPN's First Take and commentates for ESPN's coverage of the US Open tennis tournament. He has also hosted the web-based ESPN360 talk show GameNight. Granderson has appeared as a color commentator for CBS Sports during their coverage of World TeamTennis.

Granderson is a former fellow of the Institute of Politics at the University of Chicago and the Hechinger Institute at Columbia University, as well as a columnist for ABC News.

== Early life and education ==
Granderson was born and raised in Detroit, where he developed a passion for basketball and the National Basketball Association. He graduated from Western Michigan University in Kalamazoo, Michigan.

== Career ==
Granderson acted in the 1992 movie Zebrahead, which was set in his hometown of Detroit, playing the supporting role of Larry. He also played the supporting role of Arch Carrouthers in the 1996 Sidney Poitier TV movie To Sir, with Love II.

He was a co-host on the talk show pilot Joan Rivers' Straight Talk. Before he moved to ESPN and Page 2, he was a sportswriter at The Atlanta Journal-Constitution and a columnist at The Grand Rapids Press.

Granderson's writings for Page 2 usually center on the social and human aspects of sports. He writes about his own personal struggles, the life of athletes, and occasionally provides social commentary. In June 2015, he joined ABC News as a contributor in a variety of programming across the ABC News platform.

On April 18, 2012, Granderson wrote an opinion article titled "Ted Nugent should be in jail" for the online CNN website, accusing rock musician Ted Nugent of threatening the life of President of the United States Barack Obama, based on comments from a speech Nugent gave. On June 27, 2012, Granderson published a controversial opinion article titled "Don't be nosy about Fast and Furious" for CNN's website, accusing the American public of being too nosy about the way their government functions, saluting disgraced Lieutenant Colonel Oliver North for "taking one for the team" in his role in the Iran–Contra affair, and suggesting that illegal acts by government officials taken in the name of protecting the public should be hidden from public and legal scrutiny.

In 2013, he defended NBA center Jason Collins' decision to announce himself as the first openly gay male professional athlete in a major North American sport.

On January 28, 2016, Granderson made his debut on the ESPN program Around the Horn, losing in the "Showdown" portion of the episode to Jackie MacMullan.

In January 2019, Granderson was named the Los Angeles Times' Sports and Culture Columnist. This role was created for him and will exemplify the "sectionality of sports and society [and] politics and culture."

In 2023, Granderson became a professor at Western Michigan University, teaching journalism classes in the School of Communication.

== Awards and recognition ==
Granderson was the 2009 winner of the GLAAD Award for online journalism and was nominated for the award again in 2010. He received a GLAAD Award in 2022 for his ABC News podcast, Life Out Loud with LZ Granderson.

He is also a 2008 and 2010 honoree of the National Lesbian and Gay Journalists Association for column writing, and a member of the Advisory Board for You Can Play, a campaign dedicated to fighting homophobia in sports. Granderson is also on the Board for Los Angeles–based company LGBTQ Loyalty.

== Personal life ==
In a 2012 column for CNN.com, Granderson stated that he was gay. Granderson has one son, Isaiah, from his previous marriage to a woman.

Granderson's husband Steve Huesing is PetSmart's VP of Planning and interim president of Chicago's Marriage Equality USA. When the two were married in 2016, ESPN showed pictures of his wedding on SportsNation, the show on which he was a co-host. Granderson spoke about this moment on the LGBTQ&A podcast saying, "I really don't recall anyone else at ESPN who married their same-sex partner having those pictures up on the network prior to that day...I had to believe that there was a queer kid out there working in a bar, maybe not even having the volume on, glancing up and seeing that on ESPN. I know what that would've done for me."

In 2024, Granderson disclosed that he is living with HIV.

Granderson is also a faculty member at his alma mater, Western Michigan University in the School of Communication. He holds the role of Master Faculty Specialist.

== See also ==
- History of African Americans in Detroit
- LGBT culture in Metro Detroit
- Western Michigan University Faculty
- Western Michigan University Alumni
