= LGBT Detroit =

Nonprofit organization

- LGBT Detroit's logo
- Founded: 1994
- Founder: A. Nzere Kwabena (formerly known as Curtis Lipscomb)
- Type: 501(c)(3)
- Tax ID no.: 56-2393981
- Purpose: LGBTQ communities
- Location: Detroit, Michigan
- Coordinates: 42.36511°N 83.07089°W
- Region served: Detroit, Michigan
- Key people: A. Nzere Kwabena (formerly known as Curtis Lipscomb) (executive director); Antonio L. Johnson-Seals (board president)
- Employees: 6
- Website: www.lgbtdetroit.org
- Formerly called: Kick Publishing Company (a for-profit business) and KICK – The Agency for LGBT African Americans

LGBT Detroit is a Michigan nonprofit organization serving the African American lesbian, gay, bisexual and transgender (LGBTQ) population of Detroit, and nearby communities.

LGBT Detroit's mission is "to increase awareness of and support to Detroit's dynamic LGBT community through education and advocacy with integrity and pride." Their aim is to implement LGBT affirming programs, services, projects and special events; and to partner with other social justice organizations and allies with similar beliefs.

The organization is a member of CenterLink, Midtown Detroit, Inc., the National Black Justice Coalition, Center for Black Equality, and the Detroit Regional Chamber of Commerce.

== History ==
LGBT Detroit began as Kick Publishing Company (a for-profit business) in 1994 by Curtis Lipscomb. The publication was created to inform the LGBT community of issues relative to LGBT African Americans. Kick Publishing Company was the third black LGBT media company created in America. The publication and various other publications were distributed to national gay and straight retailers. The publishers of magazine soon got involved in sponsoring many LGBT events, and ultimately in 1996 members of the staff of KICK! Magazine created and formed the non-profit Detroit Black Gay Pride, Inc., the organizers of Hotter Than July!, which is Detroit's black LGBT weekend pride celebration.

The organization was founded as a nonprofit organization, known as KICK – The Agency for LGBT African Americans, in 2003 with the help of Detroit LGBT residents. The organization moved into an office in Midtown Detroit in 2007.

In 2011, The Center in Detroit opened to provide the LGBT and allied community a safe meeting space in Detroit.

The organization began discussing its name and brand in June 2013, and in May 2015 changed its name from KICK to LGBT Detroit.

== See also ==
- List of LGBT community centers in the United States
- LGBT culture in Metro Detroit
- History of the African Americans in Metro Detroit
