= A Night of Appreciation for Sabu =

A Night of Appreciation
- Promotion: Border City Wrestling
- Date: December 12, 2004
- City: Belleville, Michigan
- Venue: Diamondback Saloon
- Attendance: 700

A Night of Appreciation was a professional wrestling benefit show held to raise funds for American professional wrestler Terry "Sabu" Brunk, who had incurred costly medical bills while hospitalized for several months after contracting a mysterious virus that at one point left him temporarily paralyzed. The event took place on December 12, 2004, in the Diamondback Saloon in Belleville, Michigan, and was organized by Canadian professional wrestling promoter Scott D'Amore, veteran professional wrestling manager Jimmy Hart and Raven, a close friend of Sabu.

== Event ==
The event was attended by approximately 700 people, with some turned away due to insufficient capacity. Tickets were priced at $15 for adults and $10 for children, with VIP tickets (entailing select seating and access to an autograph session) priced at $30. The event was later released on DVD.

The Master of Ceremonies was Jimmy Hart, and the ring announcer was "Irish" Bobby Clancy. The matches featured wrestlers from D'Amore's Windsor, Ontario-based Border City Wrestling (BCW) promotion, wrestlers from Total Nonstop Action Wrestling (TNA), where Sabu was employed before being hospitalized, and friends of Sabu such as the Insane Clown Posse, wrestlers from Juggalo Championship Wrestling (JCW) where Sabu was the promotion's Heavyweight Champion, and fellow Extreme Championship Wrestling alumni Shane Douglas, Raven and Mick Foley.

Every performer worked for free and paid their own travel costs, while the building used, the lighting and sound equipment and the ring itself were all provided without charge. In addition, several wrestlers and fans donated items that were subsequently auctioned or raffled, including a World Championship Wrestling t-shirt signed by Scott Hall and Kevin Nash, and a two by four signed by Jim Duggan.

The proceeds of the event were given entirely to Sabu, who went on to make a complete recovery, and returned to the ring on May 21, 2005.

== Results ==
No.	Results	Stipulations
1	Shark Boy and D-Ray 3000 defeated Conrad Kennedy III and Eddie Venom	Tag team match
2	A-1 (with Jade Chung) defeated D'Lo Brown (c)	Singles match for the BCW Can-Am Heavyweight Championship
3	Monty Brown defeated Dallas	Singles match
4	A.J. Styles defeated Daniels	Singles match
5	Team Canada (Petey Williams and Johnny Devine) defeated James Storm and Gutter	Tag team match
6	Insane Clown Posse (Shaggy 2 Dope and Violent J) and Rude Boy defeated Corporal Robinson, Zach Gowen and Breyer Wellington	Six-man tag team match
7	Michael Shane defeated Jeff Hardy	Singles match
8	Shane Douglas defeated Raven	Singles match with Mick Foley as special guest referee
(c) / – the champion(s) heading into the match
