= Between the Lines (newspaper) =

American LGBT newspaper

- Front page of Between the Lines; January 3, 2013
- Type: Biweekly newspaper
- Format: Tabloid
- Owner(s): Pride Source Media Group, LLC.
- Founder: Mark Weinstein
- Publisher: Benjamin Jenkins
- Managing editor: Sarah Bricker Hunt
- Founded: 1993
- Language: English
- Headquarters: Ann Arbor, Michigan
- Circulation: 18,652
- ISSN: 1080-7551
- OCLC number: 28202161
- Website: pridesource.com

Between the Lines is an LGBT newspaper in the Michigan area. It is headquartered in Livonia, Metro Detroit. It is a member publication of the National Gay Media Association and is affiliated with Q Syndicate, an LGBT content provider founded in 1995.

== Voters guide ==
During election years, the newspaper publishes a voters guide with endorsements of political candidates running for office in Michigan.

== Community activities ==
The newspaper sponsors a number of LGBT events in the area. Between the Lines also organizes a Same-Sex Couples Wedding Expo, coordinated by one of the paper's publishers, Jan Stevenson.

== History ==
Between the Lines was founded by Mark Weinstein in 1995.

In the summer of 1995, Susan Horowitz and Jan Stevenson purchased the paper during a meeting Horowitz had with Shannon Rhodes, then the editor of Between the Lines. At the time of the sale, the publication was a 12-page monthly LGBT newspaper.

Horowitz, an activist from New York City, had a background in publishing as founder of Pride Publishing, Inc., and also served as the first executive director of New Festival. She took over the editorial aspect of the paper. Stevenson, a former corporate banker and first executive director of Affirmations Community Center, took over advertising.

Since the sale, the paper has utilized writers that have included artist Charles Alexander, Oakland University communications department chair Shea Howell, and John Burchett, who would go on to serve as Governor Granholm's chief of staff. Horowitz and Stevenson released their first issue as co-publishers in December 1995.

At the time, many LGBT people in Michigan remained closeted and the fight for LGBT rights was one that was often fought by individuals rather than organizations. As a result, few people wanted to give the paper their full name and fewer were willing to be photographed.

Between the Lines has covered such events as the discovery of protease inhibitors, the decision by the Michigan-based auto makers to offer domestic partnership benefits to their employees, and passage of the Michigan constitutional amendment prohibiting same-sex relationship recognition in the state, Proposal 2.

As of the end of 2020, Horowitz and Stevenson retired. New publishers, Benjamin Jenkins and Thomas Wesley, took over on January 1, 2021.

== See also ==
- LGBT community of Metro Detroit
