= Sterlingfest =

Summer festival held in Michigan

- Status: active
- Genre: fairs
- Frequency: Annually
- Location: Sterling Heights, Michigan
- Country: United States
- Years active: 42–43
- Inaugurated: 1983

Sterlingfest Art and Music Fair is an annual summer festival in the city of Sterling Heights, Michigan. It is held the last week of July at Dodge Park and has historically drawn crowds of 120,000-125,000 people over a three-day period. Sterlingfest includes an arts and crafts fair, jazz and blues performances, children's activities, a family midway, local restaurants, and a main headliner stage.

== History ==
The Sterlingfest Art and Music Fair, originally known as Sterling Heights Solid Gold Summerfest, began in July 1983 as a 3-day festival in Dodge Park. The original community event was created by the staff of the Sterling Heights Parks and Recreation Department, which included event founder D. Martin Piepenbrok and Director of Parks and Recreation Thomas L. Chappelle.

Summerfest grew in scope over the years from its origins of evening concerts and dance parties to include events such as, kids relay events, buskers, classic car shows, hot-air balloon liftoffs, and day-long shows. As attendance continued to grow, an Arts and Crafts Fair was added to Summerfest in 1991.

The festival was later renamed the Sterlingfest Art and Music Fair, and today it offers a wide variety of activities in street fair style. These include a children's activities and entertainment venue, headliner main stage concerts, carnival rides, a juried art show, restaurant row, and a 5K run. The venue has expanded beyond Dodge Park and now includes the Sterling Heights Civic Center, the city's historic Upton House, and the Sterling Heights sculpture walk. Sterlingfest also features the city's public art, as well as “SterlingScapes,” an exhibit of large-scale outdoor sculptures created by Michigan artists.

The COVID-19 pandemic caused Sterlingfest to be cancelled in 2020; it returned in July 2022 for its 38th year.

== Awards ==
The Detroit News’ rated Sterlingfest as “Michigan’s Best Summer Festival” in 2008.

WXYZ 7 Action News Viewers rated Sterlingfest as Metro Detroit's number one summer festival in 2019.

== Events ==
Sterlingfest features a variety of music, including jazz, blues, and top 40 entertainment. There is a Suds’n’Sounds stage, Kidzfest children's activities and entertainment stage, a family midway, local restaurateurs and a main headliner stage.
