= Michigan Youth Arts Festival =

Annual Arts Festival

The Michigan Youth Arts Festival (MYAF) was an annual festival in Michigan where over 900 students from grades 9-12 participate in showcases, concerts and workshops in any of the represented disciplines: Creative Writing, Dance, Film, Vocal music, Instrumental Music, visual art and theatre.

== History ==
The Michigan Youth Arts Festival was founded in 1963 as a talent screening of young musicians organized by Dr. Joseph E. Maddy, founder of the Interlochen Center for the Arts.

== MYAF Today ==
MYAF was discontinued in 2022. Before its end, the festival was a culmination of several separate adjudication processes that selects approximately 900 students from over 60,000 students that apply. It was held at Western Michigan University since 1985.
