= Caseville, Michigan =

- City
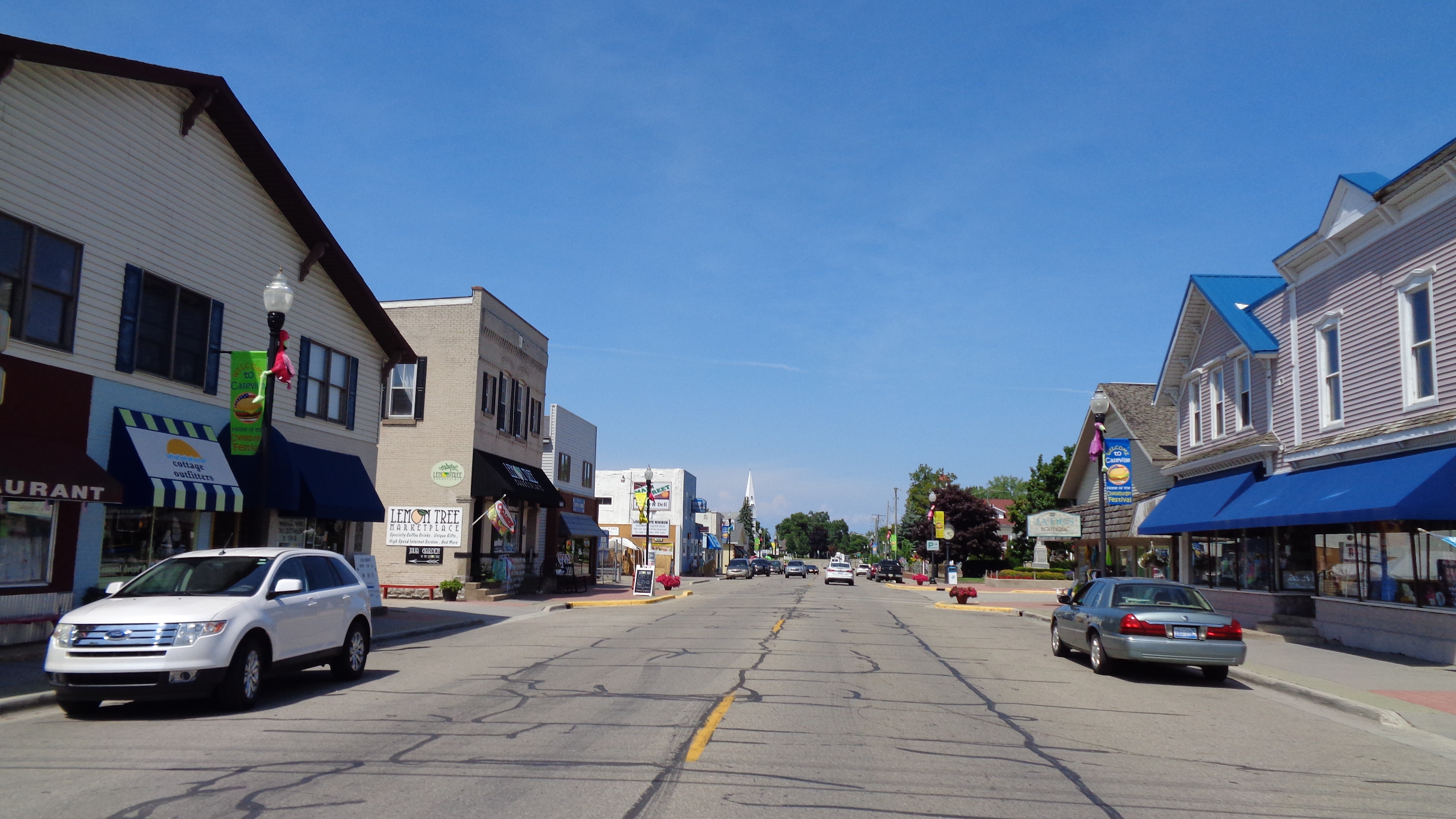
- Looking north along M-25

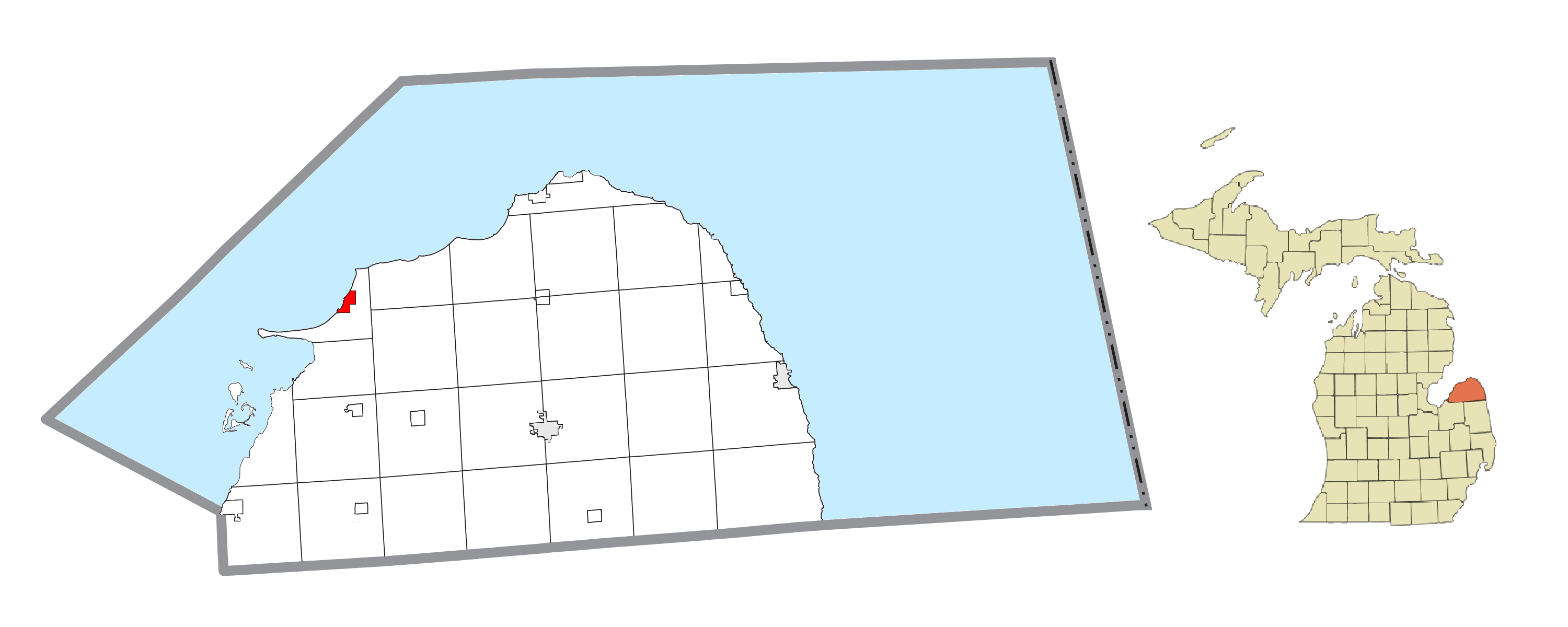
- Location within Huron County

- Location within the state of Michigan
- Coordinates: 43°56′36″N 83°16′20″W
- Country: United States
- State: Michigan
- County: Huron
- Settled: 1836
- Incorporated: 1896 (village); 2010 (city)

Government
  - Mayor: Patricia Des Jardins

Area
  - Total: 1.15 sq mi (2.97 km^{2})
  - Land: 1.12 sq mi (2.90 km^{2})
  - Water: 0.031 sq mi (0.08 km^{2})
- Elevation: 600 ft (183 m)

Population (2020)
  - Total: 652
  - Density: 582.8/sq mi (225.02/km^{2})
- Time zone: UTC-5 (Eastern (EST))
  - Summer (DST): UTC-4 (EDT)
- ZIP code(s): 48725
- Area code: 989
- FIPS code: 26-13760
- GNIS feature ID: 0622835
- Website: Official website

Caseville is a city in Huron County in the U.S. state of Michigan, located at the mouth of the Pigeon River on Saginaw Bay of Lake Huron. The population was 652 at the 2020 census. The city is surrounded by Caseville Township. A popular destination for summer tourists, it sponsors the 10-day Cheeseburger in Caseville festival, a tribute to Jimmy Buffett's song "Cheeseburger in Paradise". It has been also called the "Perch Capital of Michigan" for its extraordinary catches of the native fish yellow "perch".

== History ==
Caseville was settled by European Americans beginning with settler Reuben Dodge in 1836. They first called it Pigeon River Settlement, as it developed at the mouth of the river of that name, which leads to Saginaw Bay. Later, it was known as Port Elizabeth and Elizabethtown for the wife of William Rattle, who was agent for major landowner Leonard Case. The town developed through lumbering, with timber shipped via the lake to markets. Ship building and salt manufacturing were also early industries.

In 1856, Francis Crawford purchased 20 thousand acres from Case around the community. That same year the community assume the Caseville name. A post office opened here on January 28, 1863 with Crawford as postmaster. In 1896, Caseville was incorporated by the legislature as a village.

The Cheeseburger in Caseville festival was first held in 1999 over three days on a weekend. By 2004, the festival had grown into a 10-day event.

In 2010, Caseville became a city. A detachment effort to return three sections of the city back to the Caseville Township was underway in 2016.

== Geography ==
- According to the United States Census Bureau, the village has a total area of 1.13 square miles (2.93 km^{2}), of which 1.10 square miles (2.85 km^{2}) is land and 0.03 square miles (0.08 km^{2}) is water. The town developed along the Pigeon River, creating a municipal harbor to support shipping through Saginaw Bay and the Great Lakes.
- It is located in the Thumb of Michigan, a subregion of the Flint/Tri-Cities area.

== Demographics ==
Historical population
Census	Pop.	Note	%±
1880	634		—
1890	508		−19.9%
1900	507		−0.2%
1910	442		−12.8%
1920	385		−12.9%
1930	412		7.0%
1940	451		9.5%
1950	482		6.9%
1960	659		36.7%
1970	607		−7.9%
1980	851		40.2%
1990	857		0.7%
2000	888		3.6%
2010	777		−12.5%
2020	652		−16.1%
U.S. Decennial Census

=== 2010 census ===
As of the census of 2010, there were 777 people, 422 households, and 221 families residing in the village. The population density was 706.4 inhabitants per square mile (272.7/km^{2}). There were 837 housing units at an average density of 760.9 per square mile (293.8/km^{2}). The racial makeup of the village was 97.8% White, 0.4% African American, 0.1% Native American, 0.1% Asian, 0.1% from other races, and 1.4% from two or more races. Hispanic or Latino of any race were 0.9% of the population.

There were 422 households, of which 14.0% had children under the age of 18 living with them, 40.0% were married couples living together, 8.5% had a female householder with no husband present, 3.8% had a male householder with no wife present, and 47.6% were non-families. 42.9% of all households were made up of individuals, and 20.7% had someone living alone who was 65 years of age or older. The average household size was 1.84 and the average family size was 2.46.

The median age in the village was 55.1 years. 11.3% of residents were under the age of 18; 5.8% were between the ages of 18 and 24; 17.8% were from 25 to 44; 36.8% were from 45 to 64; and 28.4% were 65 years of age or older. The gender makeup of the village was 49.7% male and 50.3% female.

=== 2000 census ===
As of the census of 2000, there were 888 people, 432 households, and 241 families residing in the village. The population density was 778.4 inhabitants per square mile (300.5/km^{2}). There were 698 housing units at an average density of 611.9 per square mile (236.3/km^{2}). The racial makeup of the village was 97.52% White, 0.23% African American, 0.56% Native American, 0.34% Asian, 0.11% from other races, and 1.24% from two or more races. Hispanic or Latino of any race were 1.35% of the population.

There were 432 households, out of which 19.0% had children under the age of 18 living with them, 44.9% were married couples living together, 6.5% had a female householder with no husband present, and 44.2% were non-families. 39.4% of all households were made up of individuals, and 23.4% had someone living alone who was 65 years of age or older. The average household size was 2.01 and the average family size was 2.68.

In the village the population was spread out, with 18.4% under the age of 18, 4.8% from 18 to 24, 21.1% from 25 to 44, 29.3% from 45 to 64, and 26.5% who were 65 years of age or older. The median age was 49 years. For every 100 females, there were 95.6 males. For every 100 females age 18 and over, there were 92.8 males.

The median income for a household in the village was $27,065, and the median income for a family was $36,750. Males had a median income of $27,222 versus $20,982 for females. The per capita income for the village was $20,501. About 7.8% of families and 13.5% of the population were below the poverty line, including 17.9% of those under age 18 and 17.1% of those age 65 or over.

== Attractions ==
The annual Cheeseburger in Caseville festival is held to end the summer with concerts and family activities. Numerous summer cottages, larger houses and other accommodations are available for rental in the area, generally weekly during the summer and for varying terms in the off season. Nearby Sleeper State Park has campgrounds and a variety of trails and habitats. Port Crescent State Park is in the vicinity.
