= Michigan Festival of Sacred Music =

Biennial festival

- Status: active
- Genre: music festivals
- Frequency: second weekend in November in odd-numbered years
- Location: Kalamazoo, Michigan
- Coordinates: 42°17′24″N 85°35′09″W
- Country: United States
- Years active: 24–25
- Inaugurated: November 2001
- Website: www.mfsm.us

The Michigan Festival of Sacred Music (MFSM) is a biennial music festival in southwest Michigan that shares the music of diverse religious traditions. The festival occurs during the second weekend in November in odd-numbered years. Events include public concerts and presentations, lectures, and related workshops.

== History ==
In 1998 the Congregation of the First Baptist Church of Kalamazoo, Michigan voted to explore the desirability and feasibility of introducing a biennial festival of sacred music into the Kalamazoo Area. With support from the Irving S. Gilmore and Kalamazoo Community Foundations and input from Kalamazoo-area religious and community leaders, the project got underway in January 1999. An opinion survey to determine its desirability concluded that such a festival is both desirable and feasible. In January 2000 and area-wide representative group met to prepare for its introduction and decided to call it the Michigan Festival of Sacred Music. A board of directors was formed with the goal of making the festival a reality in November 2001.

The Michigan Festival of Sacred Music, now an independent organization, is supported by numerous grants and individual contributions. It continues to be led by a Board and Advisory Council made up of community leaders and representatives of many different faiths. In 2004, the MFSM presented its first off-season event. The MFSM plans to continue the presentation of single off-season events.

In 2007, the MFSM took over co-sponsorship of the Sing-Along Messiah, shared with First Congregational Church. This event, which drew over 500 attendees (including about 40 homeless people) in 2007, generally occurs annually on the Sunday following Thanksgiving. In 2007, the MFSM assumed the co-sponsorship role which had previously been taken by the Kalamazoo Bach Festival Society.
