= Cheeseburger in Caseville =

Annual festival in Caseville, Michigan, US

Coordinates: 43°56′36″N 83°16′20″W

The Cheeseburger in Caseville logo

Cheeseburger in Caseville is a festival that takes place in Caseville, Michigan, every mid-August. The festival is a tribute to tropical paradise, cheeseburgers, and Jimmy Buffett. The 10-day-long festival takes place in August, celebrating the final weeks of summer vacation. Activities at the festival range from sandcastle making to concerts and laser light shows on the beach.

== History ==
In 1999, a Caseville locals Arlene Nance and Lyn Bezemek came up with an idea for an end-of-summer festival that is now known as Cheeseburger in Caseville. About 5,000 people from around Huron County, Michigan attended the first Cheeseburger festival. What started as a three-day weekend has turned into a 10-day festival that includes concerts, the highlight of the festival, The Parade of Tropical Fools.

In 2004, five years after the debut of the festival, Caseville Chamber of Commerce president Steve Louwers took control. He continues to be instrumental in the success of Caseville's busiest 10 days.

With 2020 being cancelled caused by the COVID-19 pandemic, the 22nd was deferred to 2021.

== Parade of Tropical Fools ==
The parade is held on the first Wednesday night of the festival and is the biggest attraction that the festival has to offer. The parade can last up to two hours and attracts more than 100,000 people every year. Fans of the parade are allowed to start setting up their lawn chairs at 6 a.m. the morning of the parade. . Thousands of beads, candies, Frisbees, and other miscellaneous objects are thrown from the floats each year.
