= Stars & Stripes Festival =

Annual music festival in Michigan, USA

The Stars & Stripes Festival is a free Fourth of July festival in Sterling Heights, Michigan at Freedom Hill County Park that says it highlights everything that America has to offer. The festival debuted in 2007. Produced by Funfest Productions Inc, the Stars & Stripes Festival bills itself as drawing over 500,000 people annually to enjoy carnival rides, national and local music acts, cuisine from America the world, tributes to military service members and veterans, art exhibits, and fireworks and laser show displays.

== 2014 ==
The 8th annual Stars and Stripes Festival added an extra day, so it starts on a Thursday. Notable acts that year included:

- Josh Gracin
- Bret Michaels
- L.A. Guns
- Great White
- George Clinton and The P-Funk All Stars
- Beatlemania, LIVE!

== 2013 ==
Stars & Stripes Festival moved from downtown Mount Clemens to Freedom Hill County Park this year. The festival featured over 100 bands on 4 different stages including:

- Randy Travis
- Collective Soul
- King's X
- CAKE
- Drowning Pool
- Saliva
- Kool & The Gang
- Halestorm
- Everlast

== 2012 ==
The 2012 Stars & Stripes festival featured over 100 performances on 4 different stages in three days and included:

- Buckcherry
- Critical Bill
- Eddie Money
- Rhythm Corps
- Skid Row
- Tesla

== 2011 ==
The 2011 Stars & Stripes Festival featured artists such as:

- Ace Frehley
- Smash Mouth
- Soul Asylum
- Sweet
- Taddy Porter
- Rick Springfield
- Tonic

== 2010 ==
The 2010 Stars & Stripes Festival featured artists such as:

- The Rockets (Reunion Show)
- John Waite
- Love and Theft
- Dirty Americans
- Vince Neil
- Fuel
- Warrant
- John Michael Montgomery
- Jason Derulo
- Hush

== 2009 ==
The 2009 Stars & Stripes Festival featured artists such as:

- Morris Day & the TIme
- Uncle Kracker
- Saliva
- Edgar Winter
- Dirty Americans
- Ratt
- Night Ranger
- Dokken
- King's X

== 2008 ==
The 2008 Stars & Stripes Festival featured artists such as:

- Uncle Kracker
- Everclear
- Jonny Lang
- Candlebox
- Skid Row
- Trent Tomlinson
- The Romantics
- Sponge
- Mitch Ryder
- Gary Hoey
- LA Guns
- Rhythm Corps
- Marshall Crenshaw

== 2007 ==
In 2007, the first Stars & Stripes Festival was held, which featured artists such as:

- Puddle of Mudd
- Paul Rodgers
- Blue Öyster Cult
- Mark Farner
- Gin Blossoms
- Blessed Union of Souls
