= Johnny Nitro =

Johnny Nitro may refer to:

- John Morrison (wrestler) (born 1979), American professional wrestler, actor, and traceur
- Johnny Nitro (musician), American blues vocalist, guitarist, and band leader
