= Motor City Pride =

Annual LGBT event in Detroit, Michigan

- Motor City Pride logo

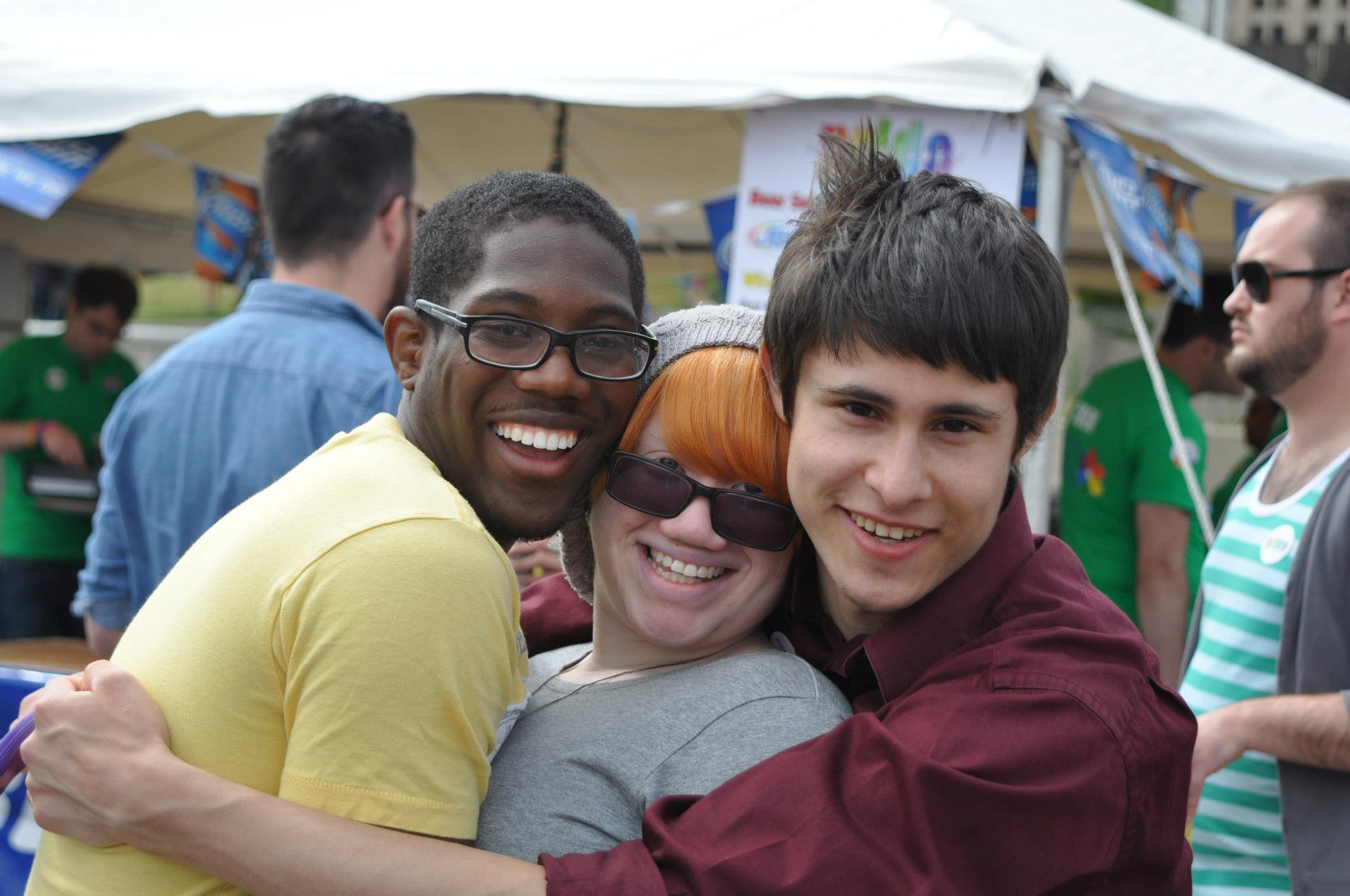
- LGBT youth in attendance at Motor City Pride 2012
- Genre: LGBT pride parade and festival
- Begins: First or second Saturday in June
- Ends: First or second Sunday in June
- Frequency: Annually
- Locations: Hart Plaza, Detroit, Michigan, United States of America
- Years active: 54
- Inaugurated: 24 June 1972
- Attendance: 44,000
- Website: http://www.motorcitypride.org/

Motor City Pride is an annual LGBT pride street festival, held in Hart Plaza in Detroit, Michigan the second Saturday and Sunday of June. Previously held in Ferndale, Michigan, the festival moved to Detroit in 2011. It is the largest LGBT event held in Michigan.

"Motor City Pride traces its roots back to June 1972 when the first march was held downtown Detroit to protest the homophobic laws and to work for recognition for LGBT Rights and Equality." In the mid-1980's Craig Covey, then director of Michigan Organization for Human Rights, is credited with organizing Detroit's first Gay and Lesbian pride festival in 1985. The Detroit Area Gay & Lesbian Council organized PrideFest from 1982 to 1992. In 1993, PrideFest became its own organization known as South East Michigan Pride and held at the Oakland Community College in Royal Oak, MI with Michael Lary as the event director. In 2001, PrideFest was moved to downtown Ferndale under the new direction of the Triangle Foundation. In 2003, the name changed to MotorCity Pride. In 2011, Motor City Pride was moved to downtown Detroit.

No event is planned in 2020 as the COVID-19 pandemic was to blame; the 49th was deferred to June 2021.

== Notable Performers ==
- Dave Audé
- Andy Bell
- Blu Cantrell
- The Fundamentals
- Killer Flamingos
- God-Des and She
- Ana Matronic
- Alex Newell
- Barbara Payton
- Eric Lehr

== See also ==
- Hotter than July (Detroit)
- LGBT community of Metro Detroit
