= Alpenfest =

Annual event

Coordinates: 45°1′29″N 84°40′36″W

- Status: active
- Frequency: Annually
- Location: Gaylord, Michigan
- Country: United States
- Years active: 61
- Website: www.gaylordalpenfest.com

The Alpenfest is an annual celebration in Gaylord, Michigan. For over 50 years the Alpenfest has been a tradition for the townspeople and its visitors. It is held the third week of July.

== The History of Alpenfest ==
In the early 1960s Gaylord, which is the county seat of Otsego County, was in the process of changing the town's image to that of the Alpine look. This change was hastened by the decision of U.S. Plywood to build a particle board plant in Gaylord. The process used to manufacture particle board was developed and patented by a Swiss businessman, Fred Fahrni. The new plant meant employment for many in the area and also opened the door for a big market in the county for aspen and pine, from which the “Novaply” was processed. Opening day for the festival set for July 5, 1965, and it was to run through July 10. Residents sewed their own dirndl's and men's alpine vests. The original event was called The Alpine Festival. It is now shortened to Alpenfest but is still celebrated as one of Gaylord's biggest events each summer.

There was no Alpenfest in 2020 due to the COVID-19 pandemic.

== Events ==
The 54th Annual Alpenfest was held on July 10–14, 2018. Festivities include arts and crafts on display and for sale, parades, concerts and stage shows, and tasty traditional foods. Kid's games, also amusement rides and family entertainment are also a part of the festival. The event that occurs after the official opening of Alpenfest is the Burning of the Boogg. It is a symbolical ceremony where wooden snowman of cotton wool is filled with the troubles and worries of the residents of the Alpine Village. The Boogg is then ignited and everyone's troubles go up in smoke and residents are free to celebrate Alpenfest. Other events include lampion making, a yodeling contest, swiss stone spitting contest, the walking parade, Die Groeste Kaffepause (World's Largest Coffee Break), ladies' ankle contest, men's knee contest and many more.

=== Queen's Pageant ===
Each year, young women between the ages of 16 - 22 compete for the title of Alpenfest Queen. The candidates are judged by mystery judges throughout the week of Alpenfest, as well as at the Queen's Pageant where they present an introduction, talent, evening gown and impromptu question. The selected Alpenfest Queen and her Court travel the state of Michigan throughout the following year of their reign and promote Alpenfest and Gaylord.

NOTE: no winner in 2020.

Year	Name
1965	Connie (Wolf) Eiland
1966	Sally (Drinkert) Glasser
1967	Sandy (Heska) King
1968	Linda (Berquist) Slaggert
1969	Barbara Wolf
1970	Elizabeth (Halter) O'Brien
1971	Lori (Stehman) Creedle
1972	Gayle (Wegmeyer) Barker
1973	Leonora Walchak
1974	Jean (Snook) Thomas
1975	Kris (Church) Emqus
1976	Julie (Bowers) Dasinger
1977	Deni (Kujat) Mahlmeister
1978	Marlene (Polus) Bailey
1979	Cheryl (Nephew) Jaquiss
1980	Kellie (Johnson) Puroll
1981	Carole (Coon) Ullrich
1982	Pam (Johnson) Morgridge
1983	Kimberlee Broome
1984	Sandy (Grisso) Tagawa
1985	Laurie (Borowiak) Zaremba
1986	Catherine Potter
1987	Diana Petoskey
1988	Jeanne Fedorowicz
1989	Tammy (Klee) Bush
1990	Rochelle Mitchell
1991	Gigi (Lochinski) Mitias
1992, 1993	Betsy (Gilmore) Neph
1994	Erin (Murphy) Whipple
1995, 1996	Carrie (Clark) Sharpe
1997	Linda (Slivinski) Weiss
1998	Cimberly Hickerson
1999	Melissa (Wishart) Olds
2000	Molly Gapinski
2001	Christina Wishart
2002	Jennifer (Fain) Murphey
2003	Diana Scott
2004	Sarah (Smith) Inendino
2005	Cassandra Cope
2006	removed
2007	Sam Dunn
2008	Leah Rolinski
2009	Heather Knouse
2010	Rachel Bartow-Freeman
2011	Stephanie LaRouche
2012	Shannon O'Connor
2013	Analiese Puzon
2014	Lauren Olivia Bushong
2015	Courtney Hough
2016	Kelly Furget
2017	Giorgi Nowicki
2018	Abby Rajala
2019	Chanelle Beach
2021	Claire Gilling
2022	Fayth Sanom
2023	Sara Flood

== Burning of the Böögg history ==
In Zürich, Switzerland they create a snowman out of wood and fill the head with fireworks. In April they light the snowman on fire. People in Zurich say, "the faster the head explodes, the warmer or better summer will be." In Zurich, the burning of the Böögg is to be the transition from winter to spring. In Gaylord however, they inherited the tradition from Switzerland, but changed the meaning to better suit Gaylord. In Gaylord, their snowmen are made of cotton wool, and instead of it being the transition of seasons, people write their worries and problems down on a piece of paper and they place the paper inside the snowman. After that they light the snowman on fire and all worries and problems are supposed to disappear with the snowman.

== Other attractions in Gaylord ==
Gaylord has many other attractions that should be interesting such as Elk Park. At Elk Park, visitors can watch the deer and elk in their natural habitat, and they could feed them.
