= CenterLink =

American LGBT organisation

- Founded: 1994
- Type: Non-profit
- Tax ID no.: 52-2292725
- Location: Fort Lauderdale, Florida
- Key people: Denise Spivak, CEO
- Revenue: $356,160 (2011)
- Website: lgbtqcenters.org
- Formerly called: National Association of LGBT Community Centers

CenterLink is an American LGBTQ organization which was founded in 1994 as a member-based coalition to support the development of strong, sustainable, LGBTQ community centers.

CenterLink produces an annual Leadership Summit for executive directors and board leaders of LGBTQ community centers and provides technical assistance and support to over 500 individuals and centers every year.

== Membership ==
Serving over 320 LGBTQ community centers across the country in 45 states, Puerto Rico and the District of Columbia, as well as centers in Canada, China, and Australia.

CenterLink's website currently provides a web-based directory (and map) of community centers both within and outside of the United States, including Australia, Canada, and Cameroon.

Current members of CenterLink include:

- Center on Halsted
- Cimarron Alliance Foundation
- Hudson Pride Connections Center
- Hudson Valley LGBTQ Community Center
- KICK (Detroit)
- Lesbian, Gay, Bisexual & Transgender Community Center
- Los Angeles Gay and Lesbian Center
- Oklahomans for Equality
- Pacific Center for Human Growth
- RU12? Community Center
- Ruth Ellis Center
- San Francisco LGBT Community Center
- Utah Pride Center
- William Way LGBT Community Center

== History ==
In July 1987 Eric Rofes and Richard Burns convened a gathering of lesbian and gay community center leaders at the Los Angeles Gay and Lesbian Community Center in conjunction with the National Gay and Lesbian Health Association annual conference, seeking to build peer support and an exchange of ideas.

In June 1994 the heads of the Dallas, Denver, Los Angeles, Minneapolis and New York Centers (respectively, John Thomas, Kat Morgan, Lorri L. Jean, Ann DeGroot and Richard Burns) launched the National Association of LGBT Community Centers as part of the celebrations marking the 25th Anniversary of the Stonewall Rebellion with the goal of strengthening the movement of LGBT community centers. At that time, more than thirty centers gathered for an all-day meeting at the Lesbian & Gay Community Services Center of New York during the Stonewall 25 commemorations.

The Association began organizing twice-yearly annual meetings, in conjunction with the Health Association conference and the National Gay and Lesbian Task Force's Creating Change Conference. Regional meetings also were organized around the country. Without paid staff, the Association relied for many years on the leadership and coordination efforts of an annually elected Executive Committee composed of seven leaders of member centers.

In January 2004, CenterLink hired its first executive director and opened a national office in Washington, DC.

In 2008 the Association changed its name to CenterLink.
