= Dearborn Homecoming Festival =

Coordinates: 42°18′38″N 83°14′51″W

- Status: Active
- Genre: homecoming
- Frequency: Annually
- Venue: Ford Field Park
- Location: Dearborn, Michigan
- Country: United States of America

The Dearborn Homecoming festival, established in 1979, is an annual celebration held in the city of Dearborn, Michigan. The three-day festival takes place at Ford Field Park near Dearborn High School. Main features include reunions, carnival rides, historical reenactments, and a large display of fireworks.

== Schedule and history ==
The festival is scheduled on a three-day weekend, which consists of Friday, Saturday, and Sunday. Most events begin at eleven in the morning and end twelve hours later. It was the 30th anniversary of the festival in the summer of 2009. The sponsor for the anniversary celebration was the Detroit Medical Center. 11 years later, the COVID-19 pandemic saw grounds for cancellation.

== Main attractions ==
The Dearborn Homecoming celebrated its 28th anniversary in 2007 with KC and The Sunshine Band. The overall turnout for festival that year was around 150,000 people. In 2008, Eddie Money was accompanied by Radio Disney, a children's show that mixes interaction and music. The stage was packed in 2009 with Larry and the Back in the Day Band kicking off the event at an attendance of 25,000 to 20,000 people. The legendary Rick Springfield picked up as the main attraction on August 8, performing hit songs such as "Jet by Wings" and "Don't Talk to Strangers". On the last day of the festival in 2009, rain brought the firework show to a halt, causing the concert and fireworks to be rescheduled. Both resumed on September 3, with a performance from the band Fifty Amp Fuse preceding the firework show.

== Food ==
The Dearborn Homecoming festival sets up a variety of thirty-four traditional food booths. An Italian booth provides classic favorites such as meatballs, pizza, and mostaccioli. The Polish tent supplies stuffed cabbage and also holds a pancake breakfast that is free to those families who are unemployed.

== Elderfest ==
The Elderfest is a section of the Dearborn Homecoming that is free fun directed at senior citizens. It starts early in the morning at eight o'clock and ends at about two in the afternoon and takes place in the Polish tent. Activities include a fun walk, free breakfast, bingo, music entertainment, and a waltz. Oakwood Healthcare System also provides free blood pressure tests.

== Other activities ==
A major part of the Dearborn Homecoming festival is the carnival, which offers twenty-six rides and usually begins at eleven in the morning. Rides include the Berry-Go-Round, Dragon Wagon, Giant Slide, Crazy Submarine, Ring of Fire, and Tilt-A-While. Another big hit is a car cruise hosted by the Dearborn Chamber of Commerce. Around one hundred and fifty cars that were all manufactured between 1950 and 1980 are involved in the parade. It starts near the 19th District Court, cruises through West Dearborn, and ends up at Ford Field for the homecoming. Adding to the activity list is another event called Living History Hill, which is put on by those associated with the Dearborn Historical Museum and is sponsored by the University of Michigan Dearborn. The historical site features frontier-style kitchens, blacksmiths, photographers, historical re-enactors, and Model T’s. The popular children's program Nickelodeon provides entertainment on Sunday. Saturdays feature a fishing derby at the pond at Ford Field, which is sponsored by the Dearborn Rotary Club. Fun courses and basketball games are found at the tennis courts and are available to the youth. New to the 2009 festival was the Guitar Hero contest, which required a fee for entrance and took place on Saturday and Sunday.
