= Hotter than July (festival) =

Black LGBTQ event in Detroit, Michigan

Hotter Than July!
- Hotter Than July! logo

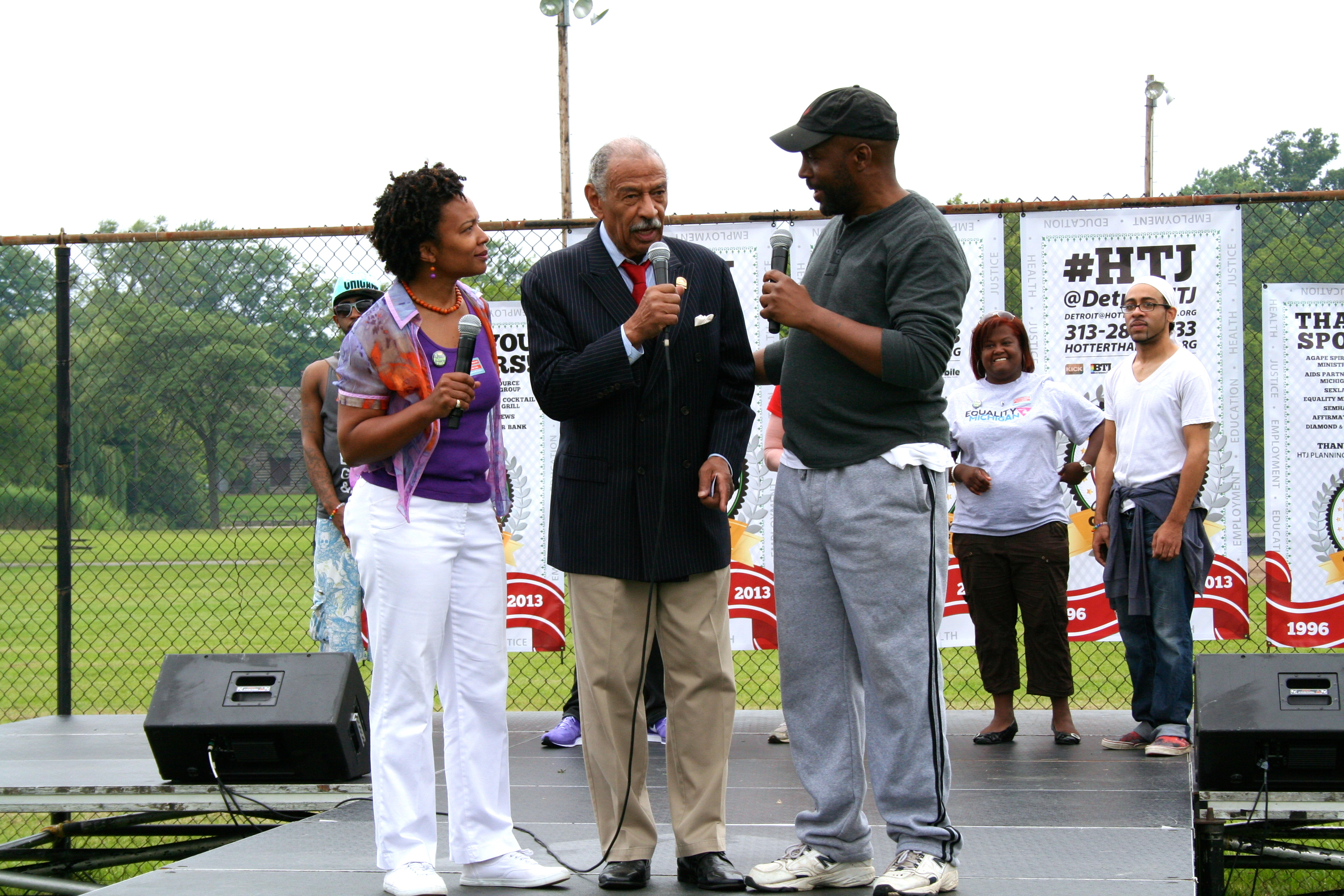
- Congressman John Conyers speaking at Hotter Than July 2013's Palmer Park Festival
- Genre: Black LGBT pride parade and festival
- Date: July
- Frequency: Annually
- Locations: Detroit, Michigan, United States of America
- Years active: 30
- Inaugurated: July 1996
- Attendance: 20,000
- Organizer: Detroit Black Pride Society and KICK
- Website: Official website

Hotter Than July! is an annual week-long black LGBT Pride celebration held annually since 1996 in Detroit, Michigan, which includes events each day culminating with a large festival on the final weekend. The Detroit Black Pride Society and KICK partner to produce Hotter Than July.

== Activities ==
The week of events generally kicks off with a candlelight vigil, followed the next evening by a three-hour party on an excursion along the Detroit River, the "Boat Ride". The later part of the week includes a film festival and The Annual Gathering for LGBT Issues, an educational conference. The week commences with a large festival with live entertainment and music is held over the weekend in Detroit's Palmer Park and draws around 20,000 participants. The night of the festival there is an after-party, and on Sunday, the celebration wraps up with a brunch.

== History ==
Hotter Than July! began in 1996 as collaboration between numerous LGBT organizations — including the Billionaire Boys Club, Men of Color Motivation Group, Karibu House and Ladies of a Current Affair. The celebration was founded on the seven principals of Kwanzaa. Until 2003, Detroit Black Pride Society co-founder, Johnny Jenkins, served as the event's primary organizer. The event is now produced by the Detroit Black Pride Society and KICK.

In 2013, candidates for Detroit's mayoral race - Krystal Crittendon, Mike Duggan, Fred Durhal, and Jean Vortkamp - attended a special Hotter Than July! community forum. Candidate Benny Napoleon did not attend the forum, but did attend the Palmer Park Festival. Seven years later, due to the COVID-19 pandemic, a virtual event was hosted.

== See also ==
- Black gay pride
- History of the African-Americans in Metro Detroit
- LGBT community of Metro Detroit
- Motor City Pride
- UK Black Pride
