= Killer Flamingos =

American pop punk band

- Origin: Detroit, Michigan, United States
- Genres: Pop; Rock; Alternative
- Years active: 2000 - present
- Label: Chim Cham Records
- Members: Darren Drake; Todd Best; David Gondoly; Alyssa Simmons; Jeff Supina
- Past members: Tim Webber; Steve Cooley; Michelle Carravallah; Eric Miller; Billy Adams; Jojo Moceri; Billy Butler; Bill Kamalay; Noreen Novrocki; Tom Bachleda; Martin Kosmalski
- Website: www.killerflamingos.com

Killer Flamingos are an American pop rock band from Dearborn, Michigan, signed to Chim Cham Records. They released their debut album Sick Society in 2002.

== Band members ==
- Alyssa Simmons – lead vocals
- Darren Drake – keyboards
- Todd Best – lead guitar
- David Gondoly – bass guitar
- Jeff Supina – drums
