= David Coulter (politician) =

American politician

Dave Coulter
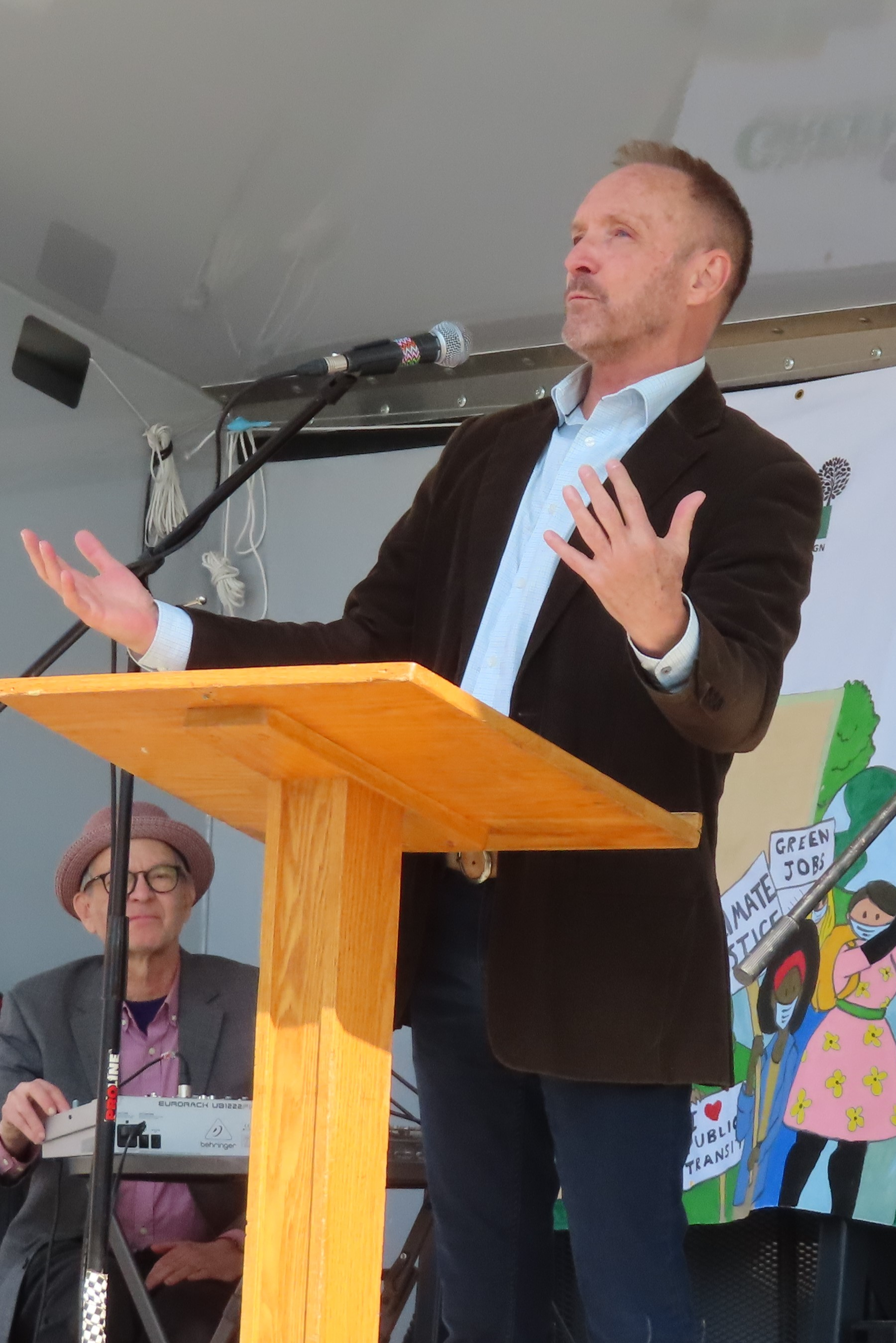

Executive of Oakland County
- Incumbent
- Assumed office August 19, 2019
- Preceded by: L. Brooks Patterson

Personal details
- Born: 1959 or 1960 (age 65–66) Detroit, Michigan, U.S.
- Party: Democratic
- Education: Michigan State University (BA)
- Website: Campaign website

David W. Coulter (born 1959 or 1960) is an American politician serving as the county executive of Oakland County, Michigan, since 2019. A member of the Democratic Party, Coulter previously served as the mayor of Ferndale, Michigan, from 2011 to 2019, and as a member of the Oakland County Board of Commissioners from 2002 to 2010.

== Personal life and education ==
Coulter was raised in St. Clair Shores, Michigan, and attended St. Joan of Arc Grade School in the city. He graduated from Bishop Gallagher High School in Harper Woods, Michigan. Coulter earned a bachelor's degree from Michigan State University. In 2007, Coulter completed Harvard University's John F. Kennedy School of Government program for Senior Executives in State and Local Government as a David Bohnett Foundation LGBTQ Victory Institute Leadership Fellow. He is openly gay.

== Career ==
Coulter has worked as a civil engineering draftsman and school teacher. He was employed for thirteen years by Michigan Consolidated Gas Company, served as the executive director of the Michigan AIDS Fund and director of external affairs for the Children's Hospital of Michigan Foundation.

Coulter was elected to the Oakland County Commission in 2002, defeating a 20-year incumbent by 86 votes. He served four terms on the Commission (2002-2010), also serving as Democratic minority leader. He left the seat to run for a Michigan Senate seat in the 14th district in 2010, but lost in the primary to Vincent Gregory. Coulter was appointed Mayor of Ferndale in January 2011 after his predecessor resigned. Coulter was then elected to the two-year position in November 2011. He was re-elected in November 2013, defeating his predecessor and two other challengers. He ran unopposed to win re-election in November 2015 and 2017.

Coulter created the Mayor's Business Council in 2012, helping lead to a period of increased business and economic growth in the city.

In 2013, Coulter, along with Congressman Sander Levin, undertook a challenge in which they spent less than $4.50 a day on food. They did so to protest cuts to food stamps. The following year, Coulter became the first mayor in Michigan to perform same-sex marriages.

On August 16, 2019, the Oakland County Commission voted to appoint Coulter to serve out the remainder of Oakland County Executive L. Brooks Patterson's term as County Executive following Patterson's August 3, 2019 death from pancreatic cancer. Coulter ran for a full term in the position in the November 2020 election, and defeated county treasurer Andy Meisner in the Democratic primary. He then won the November general election over former Michigan State Senator Mike Kowall, becoming the first elected Democratic county executive.

He led the county’s public health response to the COVID pandemic, and used related federal funds to boost adult educational attainment, increase mental health programs, promote affordable housing and purchase the obsolete Phoenix Center and adjacent office towers in Pontiac to spur redevelopment and return executive employees back to the downtown of the county seat.

Coulter won a second full term as county executive, defeating Republican businessman Nikola Gjonaj in the November 5, 2024 general election.

== Electoral history ==
Oakland County Executive general election, 2020
Party	Candidate	Votes	%
Democratic	David Coulter (incumbent)	403,863	54.75
Republican	Mike Kowall	321,803	43.62
Libertarian	Connor Nepomuceno	11,441	1.55
	Write-In	569	0.08
Total votes		737,676	100

Oakland County Executive special election, 2020
Party	Candidate	Votes	%
Democratic	David Coulter (incumbent)	406,933	55.82
Republican	Mike Kowall	321,151	44.05
	Write-In	938	0.13
Total votes		729,022	100

Oakland County Executive Democratic primary election, 2020
Party	Candidate	Votes	%
Democratic	David Coulter (incumbent)	109,761	53.96
Democratic	Andy Meisner	93,475	45.95
	Write-In	178	0.09
Total votes		203,414	100

2017 Mayoral Election, City of Ferndale (Non-Partisan)
Party	Candidate	Votes	%
Nonpartisan	David Coulter (incumbent)	1,511	95.63
	Write-In	69	4.37
Total votes		1,580	100

2015 Mayoral Election, City of Ferndale (Non-Partisan)
Party	Candidate	Votes	%
Nonpartisan	David Coulter (incumbent)	1,884	96.32
	Write-In	72	4.37
Total votes		1,956	100

2013 Mayoral Election, City of Ferndale (Non-Partisan)
Party	Candidate	Votes	%
Nonpartisan	David Coulter (incumbent)	1,634	47.67
Nonpartisan	Craig Covey	1,137	33.17
Nonpartisan	Linda Parton	335	9.77
Nonpartisan	Sherry A. Wells	335	9.04
	Write-In	12	0.35
Total votes		3,428	100

2011 Mayoral Election, City of Ferndale (Non-Partisan)
Party	Candidate	Votes	%
Nonpartisan	David Coulter	1,819	84.17
Nonpartisan	Raymond Willis	326	15.09
	Write-In	16	0.74
Total votes		2,161	100
