= Ferndale, Michigan =

- City
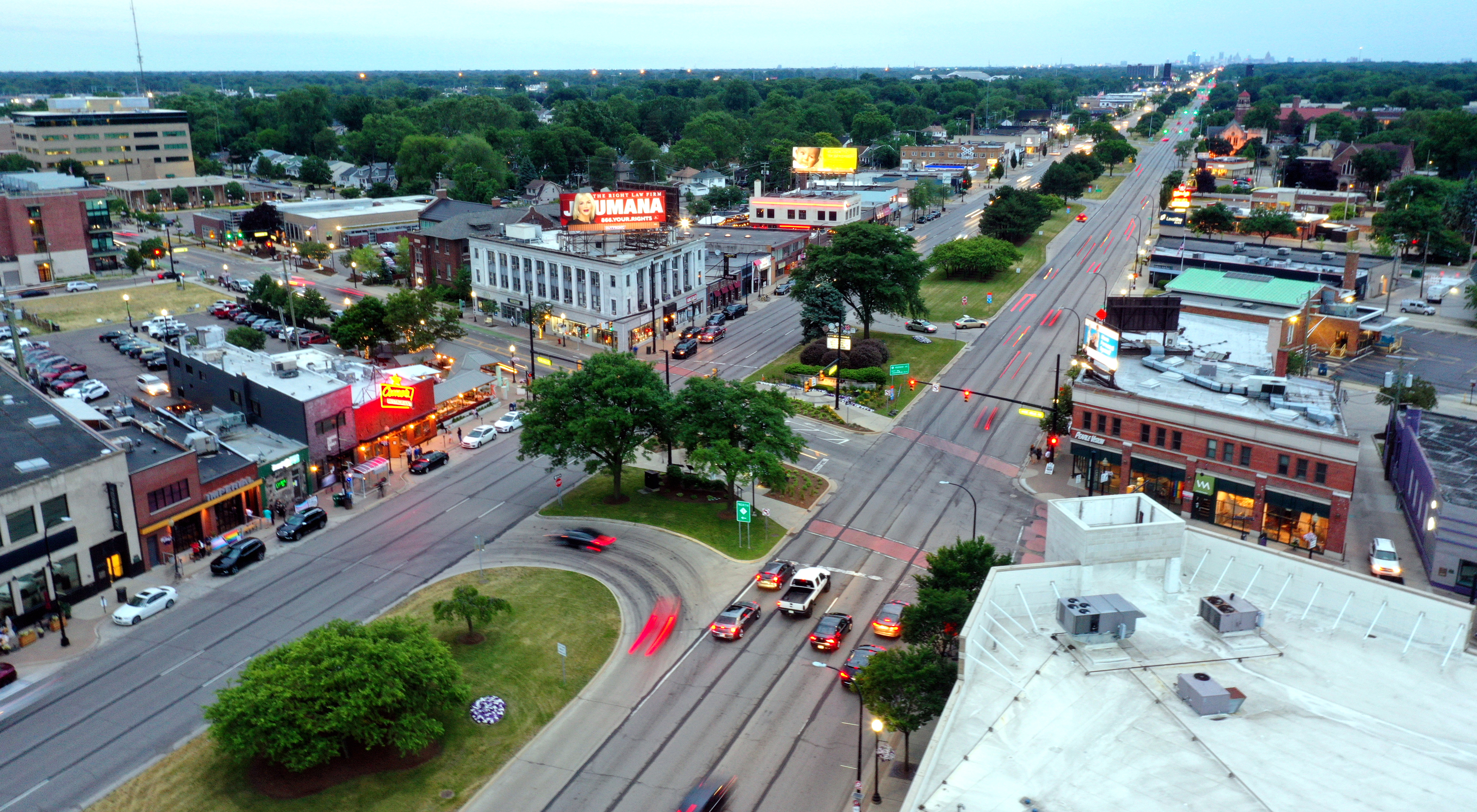
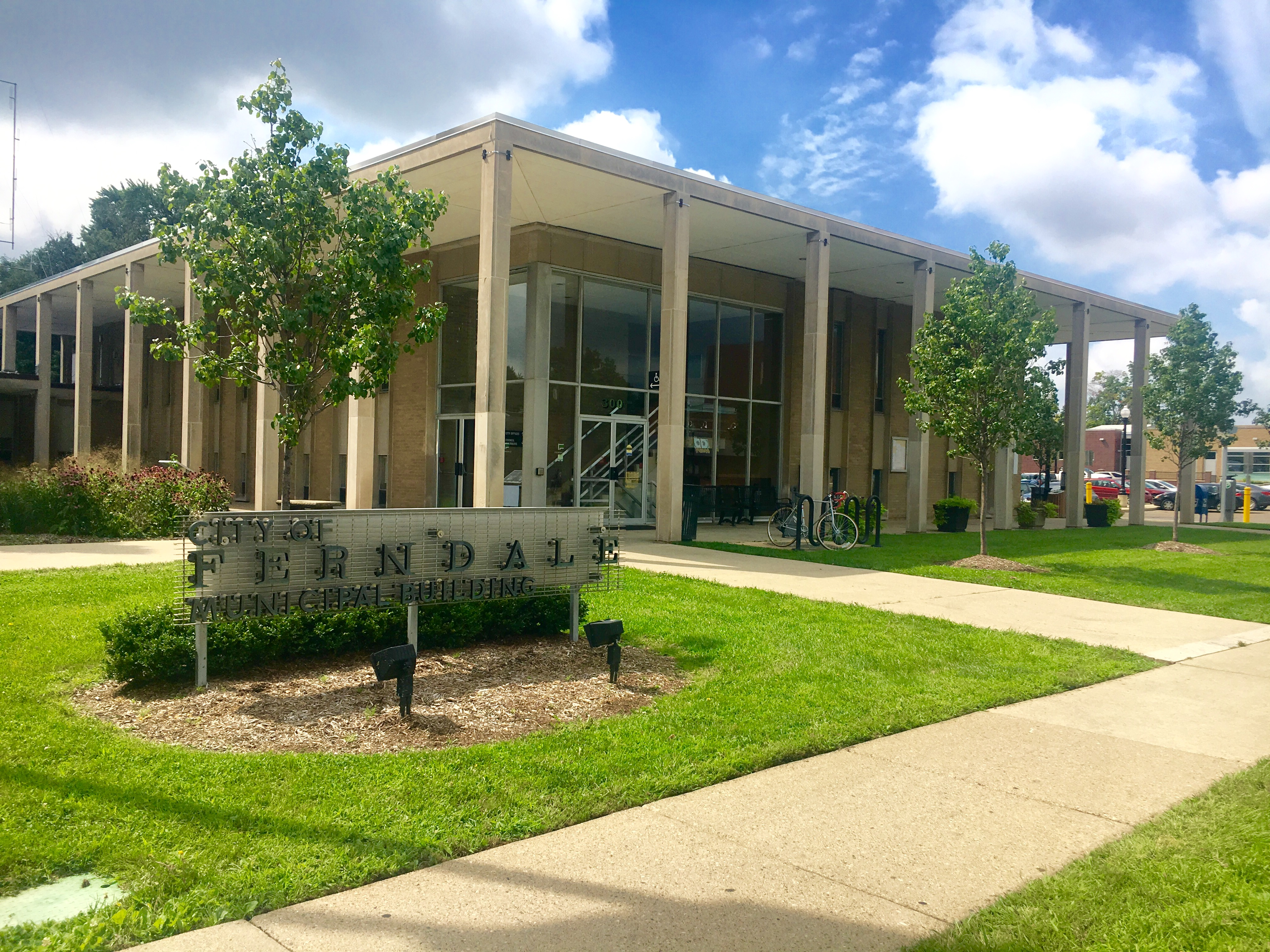
- Top-to-bottom: Downtown Ferndale looking south toward Detroit, Ferndale City Hall

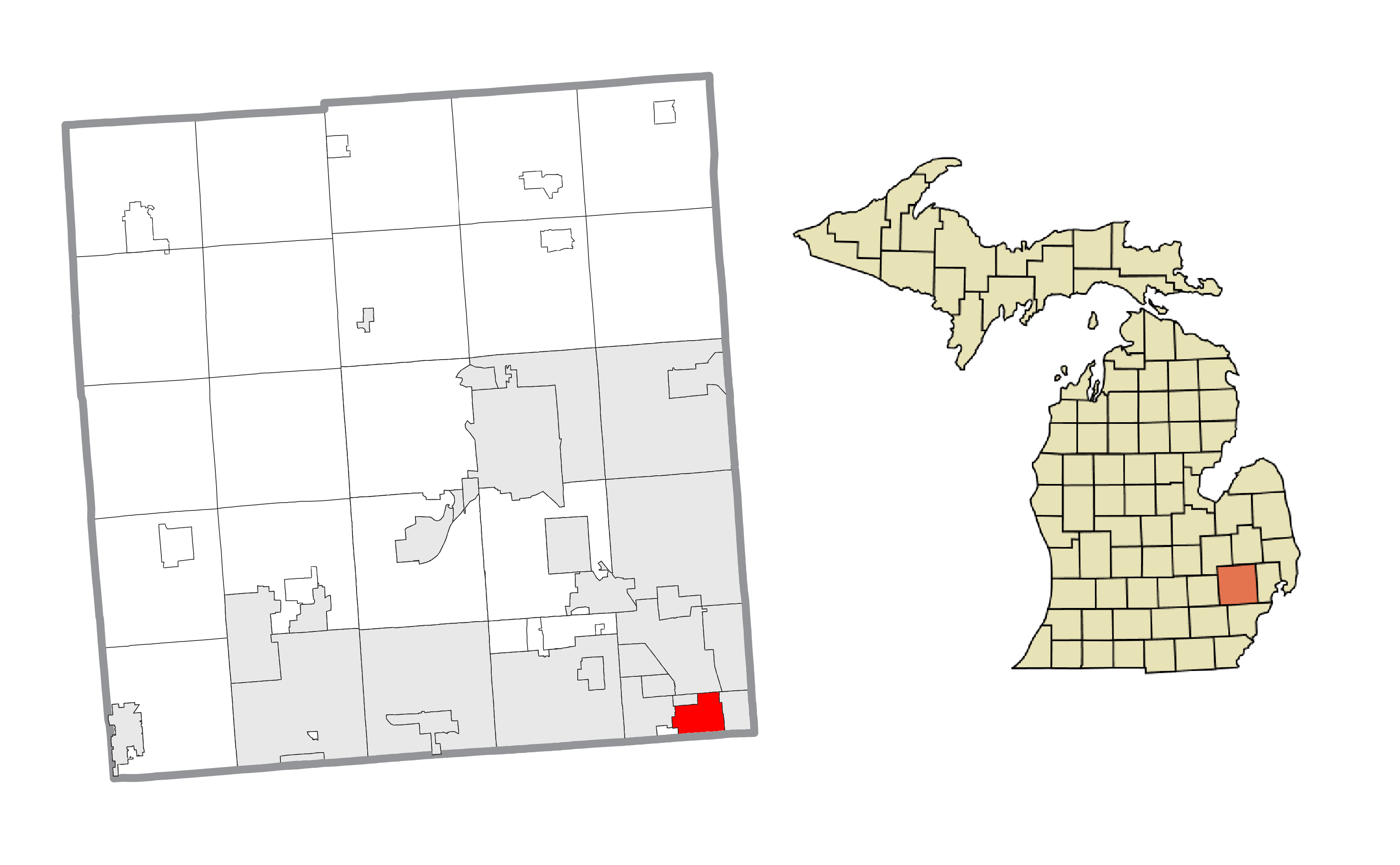
- Location within Oakland County

- Location within the State of Michigan
- Coordinates: 42°27′38″N 83°08′05″W
- Country: United States
- State: Michigan
- County: Oakland
- Incorporated: 1918 (village); 7 March 1927 (city)

Government
  - Type: Council–manager
  - Mayor: Raylon Leaks-May
  - Manager: Colleen O'Toole

Area
  - City: 3.88 sq mi (10.04 km^{2})
  - Land: 3.88 sq mi (10.04 km^{2})
  - Water: 0 sq mi (0.00 km^{2})
- Elevation: 646 ft (197 m)

Population (2020)
  - City: 19,190
  - Density: 4,949.5/sq mi (1,911.03/km^{2})
  - Metro: 4,392,041 (Metro Detroit)
- Time zone: UTC-5 (EST)
  - Summer (DST): UTC-4 (EDT)
- ZIP code(s): 48220
- Area code: 248
- FIPS code: 26-27880
- GNIS feature ID: 0625911
- Website: Official website

Ferndale is a city in Oakland County, Michigan, United States. An inner-ring suburb of Detroit on the Woodward Corridor, Ferndale borders Detroit to the north, roughly 10 miles (16.1 km) northwest of downtown Detroit. As of the 2020 census, the city had a population of 19,190.

Ferndale is noted for its LGBTQ+ community, and its progressive politics.

== History ==
Native Americans were original inhabitants of the area now known as the City of Ferndale. In the 1800s farmers began cultivating the land. After the invention of the automobile and the development of the automotive assembly line, the population of Ferndale increased rapidly.

Ferndale was incorporated into a village in 1918. It was then incorporated into a city on April 4, 1927, by vote of the citizens of the village. It became a bedroom community for Detroit workers, with most of its growth in housing from 1920 to 1951. Through the early 1950s there were trolley (interurban railroad) lines in the median strip of Woodward Avenue from downtown Detroit to Pontiac. These helped the northern suburbs of Detroit grow as bedroom communities as people could take the trolley to shop or work in Detroit.

In the 1970s, the Ferndale suburban community emerged as a place for families to raise children during the "Baby Boom" era, with its elementary schools, a downtown, city parks, active churches and civic groups. Ferndale High was completed in 1958, replacing the older Lincoln High School.

Ferndale's downtown shopping area, 9 Mile Road, featured many busy, popular stores in the 1940s to 1960s, but later went into decline, and many businesses closed. In recent decades, the downtown area has revitalized. Ferndale's downtown is formed by two major thoroughfares, Nine Mile Road and Woodward Avenue. Circa 1997 the city made the downtown more pedestrian-friendly by narrowing West Nine Mile Road, the heart of the downtown, to one lane in each direction and adding on-street parking. The result has been a return of pedestrian traffic and an influx of new stores and restaurants. The city has continued to make itself more accessible to people by reducing traffic lanes on Hilton Road and Pinecrest Road, two major local north–south streets, and adding bicycle lanes.

== Geography ==
According to the United States Census Bureau, the city has a total area of 3.88 square miles (10.05 km^{2}), all land.

== Demographics ==
Historical population
Census	Pop.	Note	%±
1920	2,640		—
1930	20,855		690.0%
1940	22,523		8.0%
1950	29,675		31.8%
1960	31,347		5.6%
1970	30,850		−1.6%
1980	26,227		−15.0%
1990	25,084		−4.4%
2000	22,105		−11.9%
2010	19,900		−10.0%
2020	19,190		−3.6%
2024 (est.)	18,969		−1.2%
U.S. Decennial Census

=== 2020 census ===
As of the 2020 census, Ferndale had a population of 19,190. The median age was 35.4 years. 12.1% of residents were under the age of 18 and 11.0% of residents were 65 years of age or older. For every 100 females there were 102.5 males, and for every 100 females age 18 and over there were 102.1 males age 18 and over.

100.0% of residents lived in urban areas, while 0.0% lived in rural areas.

There were 10,029 households in Ferndale, of which 14.1% had children under the age of 18 living in them. Of all households, 29.7% were married-couple households, 27.7% were households with a male householder and no spouse or partner present, and 29.8% were households with a female householder and no spouse or partner present. About 41.1% of all households were made up of individuals and 7.6% had someone living alone who was 65 years of age or older.

There were 10,571 housing units, of which 5.1% were vacant. The homeowner vacancy rate was 1.7% and the rental vacancy rate was 5.4%.

Racial composition as of the 2020 census
Race	Number	Percent
White	15,921	83.0%
Black or African American	1,176	6.1%
American Indian and Alaska Native	51	0.3%
Asian	422	2.2%
Native Hawaiian and Other Pacific Islander	3	0.0%
Some other race	242	1.3%
Two or more races	1,375	7.2%
Hispanic or Latino (of any race)	842	4.4%

=== 2010 census ===
As of the census of 2010, there were 19,900 people, 9,559 households, and 4,349 families living in the city. The population density was 5,128.9 inhabitants per square mile (1,980.3/km^{2}). There were 10,477 housing units at an average density of 2,700.3 per square mile (1,042.6/km^{2}). The racial makeup of the city was 84.7% White, 9.6% African American, 0.5% Native American, 1.3% Asian, 0.1% Pacific Islander, 0.5% from other races, and 3.4% from two or more races. Hispanic or Latino residents of any race were 2.8% of the population.

There were 9,559 households, of which 20.4% had children under the age of 18 living with them, 30.3% were married couples living together, 10.9% had a female householder with no husband present, 4.3% had a male householder with no wife present, and 54.5% were non-families. 39.0% of all households were made up of individuals, and 6.8% had someone living alone who was 65 years of age or older. The average household size was 2.08 and the average family size was 2.85.

The median age in the city was 35.6 years. 16.5% of residents were under the age of 18; 8.3% were between the ages of 18 and 24; 41.2% were from 25 to 44; 25.2% were from 45 to 64; and 8.9% were 65 years of age or older. The gender makeup of the city was 49.9% male and 50.1% female.

=== 2000 census ===
As of the census of 2000, there were 22,105 people, 9,872 households, and 5,103 families living in the city. The population density was 5,697.9 inhabitants per square mile (2,200.0/km^{2}). There were 10,243 housing units at an average density of 2,640.3 per square mile (1,019.4/km^{2}). The racial makeup of the city was 91.46% White, 3.42% black or African American, 0.55% Native American, 1.32% Asian, 0.02% Pacific Islander, 0.64% from other races, and 2.58% from two or more races. 1.81% of the population were Hispanic or Latino of any race.

There were 9,872 households, out of which 23.5% had children under the age of 18 living with them, 35.8% were married couples living together, 11.5% had a female householder with no husband present, and 48.3% were non-families. 35.2% of all households were made up of individuals, and 7.8% had someone living alone who was 65 years of age or older. The average household size was 2.23 and the average family size was 2.97.

In the city, the population was spread out, with 20.4% under the age of 18, 9.1% from 18 to 24, 41.2% from 25 to 44, 19.7% from 45 to 64, and 9.7% who were 65 years of age or older. The median age was 34 years. For every 100 females, there were 99.5 males. For every 100 females age 18 and over, there were 97.8 males.

The median income for a household in the city was $45,629, and the median income for a family was $51,687. Males had a median income of $40,392 versus $30,859 for females. The per capita income for the city was $23,133. About 7.2% of families and 8.2% of the population were below the poverty line, including 12.0% of those under age 18 and 9.6% of those age 65 or over.

=== LGBT population ===
The 1980s and 1990s saw the growth of the LGBT population in Ferndale, coinciding with a migration from neighborhoods in Detroit to communities north along Woodward Avenue, including Royal Oak, Pleasant Ridge and others. In 1999, a proposed non-discrimination ordinance was introduced in Ferndale, but was defeated. The Motor City Pride festival moved to Ferndale from Royal Oak in 2001. In 2006, the city passed an anti-discrimination ordinance protecting LGBT people from discrimination in public accommodations, housing, and business, with 70% in favor and 30% in opposition. Affirmations, a 17,000-square-foot (1,600 m^{2}) LGBT community center in Downtown Ferndale, opened its new, expanded building on Sunday June 3, 2007, the same year the city elected the first openly gay mayor in Michigan. In 2011, Motor City Pride moved to Detroit's Hart Plaza. Ferndale Pride was started that year.

== Government ==
Ferndale utilizes the council-manager form of government, and is governed by a city council consisting of a mayor and four council members. The city council appoints a city manager, who manages the day-to-day operations of the city. The current mayor of Ferndale is Raylon Leaks-May. The current city manager is Colleen O'Toole.

=== Federal, state, and county legislators ===
United States House of Representatives
District	Representative	Party	Since
11th	Haley Stevens	Democratic	2023 (Note: Stevens has represented the 11th district since 2019, but the district has only included Ferndale since 2023.)

Michigan Senate
District	Senator	Party	Since
8th	Mallory McMorrow	Democratic	2023

Michigan House of Representatives
District	Representative	Party	Since
7th	Helena Scott	Democratic	2023
8th	Mike McFall	Democratic	2023

Oakland County Board of Commissioners
District	Commissioner	Party	Since
19	Charlie Cavell	Democratic	2021

== Education ==
Ferndale has its own school district, Ferndale Public Schools, including elementary, middle, and high schools. Ferndale High School and University High School are both part of Ferndale Public Schools. A portion of Ferndale is instead zoned to Hazel Park Schools.

== Media ==
Ferndale has a local radio station WFCB-LP (100.7 FM) named Ferndale Radio which started airing in 2017. Ferndale Radio is a low power FM station that broadcasts from a studio at the Rustbelt Market in Ferndale. Ferndale Radio is a non-profit with volunteer radio DJs and managed by volunteers.

Church Militant used to have their headquarters in Ferndale until they ceased operations.

== Notable people ==
- James Blanchard, Governor of Michigan (1983–91) and U.S. Ambassador to Canada
- Joseph Bruce (a.k.a. Violent J), member of Insane Clown Posse
- Ron Carter, jazz musician
- Dana Elcar, actor best known for film The Sting and role as Peter Thornton on TV series MacGyver
- Elena Ford, heiress
- Frank Hagel, painter and sculptor
- Josh Malerman, novelist and singer-songwriter
- Rashad Phillips, professional basketball player; played for Ferndale High School (1992–96)
- Ken Rowe, MLB pitcher and coach; born in Ferndale
- The Spinners, American R&B group, formed in Ferndale.
- Bob Welch, MLB pitcher, 1990 Cy Young Award winner, two-time All-Star, three-time World Series champion; lived in Ferndale, attended school in Hazel Park

== See also ==
- Woodward Corridor
- LGBT community of Metro Detroit
