= LGBTQ history in Connecticut =

The state of Connecticut, in the Northeastern United States, has been home to LGBT communities and culture since the early 20th century. The state was intolerant of homosexuality at its inception in 1639, but it became the second state to repeal its sodomy law, in 1971. Similarly, in 2008 it became the second state in the country to legalize same-sex marriage.

== History and legality of same-sex activity ==
The Fundamental Orders, which established Connecticut as a self-ruling colony in 1639, provided that laws adopted by the Connecticut authorities would be consistent with those of England. As a result, common law was adopted in the colony, which recognized sodomy as a capital offense for males only. A sodomy statute providing for the death penalty was passed in 1642.

Following independence in 1776, Connecticut continued to enforce common law. In 1821, the Connecticut General Assembly adopted a new criminal code that made several changes to the sodomy statute. Firstly, the death penalty was removed as a penalty and replaced by life imprisonment, and secondly only males could be the victims of an act of sodomy though the perpetrator could be of either sex. The new law criminalized "carnal knowledge", allowing for the prosecution of anal intercourse and possibly fellatio (oral sex). There are no published sodomy cases during this period, so it is unknown if oral sex was prosecuted under this law. In 1909, the penalty for sodomy was reduced from life imprisonment to 30 years in prison.

In 1811, the Connecticut Supreme Court ruled in Fowler v. State that the state's law against "lascivious carriage and behavior" applied only to conduct between people of the opposite sex. This court case was significant in 1962, when Max Fenster, accused of same-sex "lascivious carriage and behavior", argued in court that under Fowler the law covered only opposite-sex conduct. Reluctantly, the court unanimously agreed.

Legislative commission reports in 1967 and 1968 recommended the repeal of the sodomy law because it "deterred deviates from seeking psychiatric help" and it "was enforced only by 'capricious selection', which encourages blackmail". A comprehensive criminal code was passed in 1969, which abrogated common-law crimes and repealed the sodomy law in relation to consensual acts, and took effect in 1971. The age of consent was set at 16 regardless of gender and sexual orientation, and lowered to 15 in 1975.

== 17th century ==
There are several known cases of men being executed under the sodomy statute, including William Plaine of Guilford in 1646 for having masturbated a number of young men in the town. In 1655, a servant named John Knight was executed in the New Haven Colony for having engaged in consensual sex with both men and women. The statute was enforced inconsistently, however; for example, in 1677 Nicholas Sension was sentenced in the town of Windsor to "good behavior for the rest of his life", escaping the death penalty most likely due to his wealth.

== 20th century ==
=== 1927–1949 ===
In January 1927, Mae West's play The Drag: A Homosexual Comedy in Three Acts previewed in Bridgeport. The play featured an all-gay cast and discussed "the cost of living a secret life". Although well-received by audiences, it was ultimately shut down for being too vulgar.

In April 1931, Niles Marsh performed at Hartford's Capitol Theater as an opener to the film Charlie Chan.

In 1934, Four Saints in Three Acts, a Modernist opera by gay composer Virgil Thompson and lesbian writer Gertrude Stein, debuted at the Wadsworth Athaneum. The opera, which featured an all-Black cast, was "a queer reinterpretation of sainthood".

In 1939, the state's first gay bar, the Cedar Brook Cafe, opened in Westport. It closed in 2010; at the time it was the country's oldest gay bar.

In the mid-1940s, Howard Metzger moved in with his lover, architect Frederic Palmer, in East Haddam. The couple were not publicly out, but their status as a couple was well-known in their community. They hosted many gatherings of LGBT friends at their home, which was bequeathed to Connecticut Landmarks and opened as a museum in 2019.

Alan L. Hart, one of the earliest American trans men to have gender-affirming surgery, moved to Connecticut with his wife, Edna Ruddick in the late 1940s. Hart worked as the Director of Hospitalization and Rehabilitation for the Connecticut State Tuberculosis Commission, and the couple remained in Connecticut until Hart's death in 1962.

=== 1950–1969 ===
In 1951, Nick's Cafe, a popular gay institution, opened in Hartford.

In April 1952, Hartford authorities cracked down on so-called "sex deviates", arresting dozens of men and publishing their names in newspapers.

In 1954, gay poet James Merrill moved to Stonington with his partner, David Jackson. Merrill lived at the residence until his death in 1995; the house has since been added to the National Register of Historic Places and designated a National Historic Landmark.

In 1963, Episcopal priest Clinton Jones, of Hartford's Christ Church Cathedral, founded Project H, a group which provided counseling services for gay Christians in the region. Meetings were held at the YMCA in Hartford, with social workers, psychologists, and clergy in attendance.

In 1967, Connecticut overturned its sodomy law. Also that year, the UConn Gay Alliance was founded at the University of Connecticut.

Beginning in May 1968, Connecticut was home to the Kalos Society, an early gay advocacy group which grew out of Project H. The Kalos Society went on to organize public demonstrations and to protest against police brutality.

=== 1970–1979 ===
In 1970, the Commissioner of Motor Vehicles denied a driver's license to David Fowlett because of his sexual orientation. Fowlett later committed suicide. Also that year, a Gay Rights Bill was introduced, with the backing of the Kalos Society.

In 1973, Hartford formed a branch of the Metropolitan Community Church.

The 1970s saw the first LGBT publications in the state, starting with The Griffin, published by the Kalos Society, and later, The Connexion.

Popular gay institutions in New Haven in the 1970s included the bars The Pub and The Neuter Rooster.

=== 1980–1989 ===
In November 1980, Gay Spirit Radio, one of the first gay radio shows in the country, was founded at WWUH at the University of Hartford. Hartford’s Metropolitan Community Church began publishing the magazine Metroline in 1982, which was published biweekly starting in 1983. Both Gay Spirit and Metroline provided health information during the AIDS crisis, as well as encouraging their audiences to join in AIDS-related activism.

On June 26, 1982, the first gay rally in the state was held at the Old State House. Hartford Community Television covered the event.

In 1986, the Connecticut Gay Men's Chorus was formed.

In 1987, Yale University gained a reputation as the "Gay Ivy", due to LGBT Yale students' participation in New Haven's gay nightlife.

In 1988, the Connecticut Gay & Lesbian Film Festival was founded.

In 1988, Wethersfield resident Richard Riehl was murdered in an act of homophobic violence. His death incited the state's LGBT community, who began pushing harder for legislative protections.

=== 1990–1999 ===
In 1990, sexual orientation was included in hate crime legislation passed by the state. The following year, the Gay Rights Bill was finally passed, twenty years after its initial introduction. The bill prohibited discrimination against people for their sexual orientation, although some exceptions were included for religious organizations, adoption, and fostering, among others.

In 1993, the New Haven Board of Aldermen proposed recognizing domestic partnerships at the city level. Despite LGBT activists' backing, the backlash from religious groups led to the proposal being rejected. The proposal was rejected a second time in 2003.

The New Haven Pride Center was founded in 1996, the first queer center in the city and one of only a few in the state.

== 21st century ==
=== 2000–2019 ===
In 2008, same-sex marriage was legalized in Connecticut, the second state in the country to do so after its northern neighbor, Massachusetts.

In 2011, Connecticut lawmakers added "gender identity and expression" to the list of classes protected against workplace discrimination.

In 2017, Connecticut banned conversion therapy for minors. The same year, the state's first known transgender lawmaker was elected to a citywide position in Stamford.

In July 2018, Connecticut adopted a policy which mandated that transgender inmates be housed according to their gender identity, becoming the first state in the country to adopt such a policy. The policy also mandated that prison staff use inmates' preferred pronouns, that inmates be searched by staff of the same gender identity, and that inmates "have access to gender-appropriate commissary items, educational materials, and prison programming".

=== 2020–present ===
By the 2020s, much of New Haven's LGBT nightlife had assimilated into mainstream nightlife, in part attributed to a mainstream society more accepting of LGBT individuals.

In 2022, Equality Connecticut was formed, a group focused on LGBT advocacy in Connecticut legislation. In June, Connecticut became the first state to have its Office of Tourism partner with the International LGBTQ+ Travel Association. In late 2022, Erick Russell was voted into office of Connecticut state treasurer, becoming the first openly LGBT Black person to be elected to statewide office in the country.

In March 2023, the trans flag was flown at the Connecticut State Capitol for the first time.

== See also ==
- LGBT rights in Connecticut
