= June 3 =

June 3 this year in various calendars
- Wednesday, 3 June 2026
| Akan | Monowukuo |
| Armenian | 18 Margach 1475 |
| Aztec | Teotleco 4, 2 Malīnalli |
| Babylonian | 16 Ayaru, 2337 SE |
| Balinese pawukon | Menga, Kajeng, Menala, Umanis, Maulu, Buda of Julungwangi, Yama, Gigis, Suka |
| Bengali | 20 Joishtho, BS 1433 |
| Chinese | Yang Earth Monkey・Winnowing Basket Mansion; Fire Horse Year, Month 4, Day 18 (Xiaoman, 2 days until Mangzhong) |
| Common Era | 3 June 2026 CE |
| Coptic | 26 Pashons, AM 1742 |
| Egyptian | 18 Phaophi, 2775 NE |
| Ethiopian | 26 Genbot, 2018 Amätä Məhrät |
| French Republican | Décade II, Quintidi de Prairial de l'Année 234 de la République |
| Gregorian | 3 June, AD 2026 |
| Hebrew | 18 Sivan, AM 5786 |
| Hindu | Pūrvāṣāḍha・Śubha; Solar: 20 Jyeṣṭha, 1948 SE; Lunisolar: Tr̥tīyā, Kṛishna pakṣa of Adhika Jyeṣṭha, 2083 VE; Rāudra・5127 KY・1,872,729 |
| Icelandic | Miðvikudagur, 12 Skerpla 2026 |
| Islamic | 17 Dhu al-Hijjah, AH 1447 (using tabular method) |
| ISO week date | 2026-W23-3 |
| Japanese | 18 Uzuki, Reiwa 8 (Shōman, 3 days until Bōshu) |
| Julian | 21 May, AD 2026 (AM 7534) |
| Julian day | 2461195 |
| Korean | 18 Baemdal, 4359 DE |
| Maya | 13.0.13.11.12; 5 Zotz, 2 Eb |
| Roman | ante diem XII Kalendas Iunias, MMDCCLXXIX AUC |
| Solar Hijri | 13 Khordad, SH 1405 |
| Tibetan | 18 sa ga, me pho rta 2153 or 1772 or 1000 |

| << | June | | | | | >> |
| Su | Mo | Tu | We | Th | Fr | Sa |
| | 1 | 2 | 3 | 4 | 5 | 6 |
| 7 | 8 | 9 | 10 | 11 | 12 | 13 |
| 14 | 15 | 16 | 17 | 18 | 19 | 20 |
| 21 | 22 | 23 | 24 | 25 | 26 | 27 |
| 28 | 29 | 30 |
2026

June 3 in recent years
2026 (Wednesday)
2025 (Tuesday)
2024 (Monday)
2023 (Saturday)
2022 (Friday)
2021 (Thursday)
2020 (Wednesday)
2019 (Monday)
2018 (Sunday)
2017 (Saturday)

June 3 is the 154th day of the year (155th in leap years) in the Gregorian calendar; 211 days remain until the end of the year.

== Events ==
=== Pre-1600 ===
- 350 – The Roman usurper Nepotianus, of the Constantinian dynasty, proclaims himself Roman emperor, entering Rome at the head of a group of gladiators.
- 713 – The Byzantine emperor Philippicus is blinded, deposed and sent into exile by conspirators of the Opsikion army in Thrace. He is succeeded by Anastasios II, who begins the reorganization of the Byzantine army.
- 1098 – After a five-month siege during the First Crusade, the Crusaders seize Antioch.
- 1140 – The French scholar Peter Abelard is found guilty of heresy.
- 1326 – The Treaty of Novgorod delineates borders between Russia and Norway in Finnmark.
- 1539 – Hernando de Soto claims Florida for Spain.

=== 1601–1900 ===
- 1602 – An English naval force defeats a fleet of Spanish galleys, and captures a large Portuguese carrack at the Battle of Sesimbra Bay.
- 1608 – Samuel de Champlain lands at Tadoussac, Quebec, in the course of his third voyage to New France, and begins erecting fortifications.
- 1621 – The Dutch West India Company receives a charter for New Netherland.
- 1658 – Pope Alexander VII appoints François de Laval vicar apostolic in New France.
- 1665 – James Stuart, Duke of York (later to become King James II of England), defeats the Dutch fleet off the coast of Lowestoft.
- 1700 – Foundation of the Academy of the Distrustful in the library room of the Palau Dalmases in Barcelona.
- 1781 – Jack Jouett begins his midnight ride to warn Thomas Jefferson and the Virginia legislature of an impending British raid.
- 1839 – In Humen, China, Lin Zexu destroys 1.2 million kilograms of opium confiscated from British merchants, providing Britain with a casus belli to open hostilities, resulting in the First Opium War.
- 1844 – The last pair of great auks is killed.
- 1861 – American Civil War: Battle of Philippi (also called the Philippi Races): Union forces rout Confederate troops in Barbour County, Virginia, now West Virginia.
- 1863 – American Civil War: The Gettysburg campaign begins as Confederate General Robert E. Lee and the Army of Northern Virginia commence marching to start his second invasion of the North.
- 1864 – American Civil War: Union forces under Ulysses S. Grant sustain heavy casualties attacking Confederate troops under Robert E. Lee at the Battle of Cold Harbor in Hanover County, Virginia.
- 1885 – In the last military engagement fought on Canadian soil, the Cree leader, Big Bear, escapes the North-West Mounted Police.
- 1889 – The first long-distance electric power transmission line in the United States is completed, running 14 miles (23 km) between a generator at Willamette Falls and downtown Portland, Oregon.
- 1892 – Liverpool F.C. is founded by John Houlding.

=== 1901–present ===
- 1916 – The National Defense Act is signed into law, increasing the size of the United States National Guard by 450,000 men.
- 1935 – One thousand unemployed Canadian workers board freight cars in Vancouver, beginning a protest trek to Ottawa.
- 1937 – The Duke of Windsor (the former King Edward VIII of the United Kingdom) marries Wallis Simpson.
- 1940 – World War II: During the Battle of France, the Luftwaffe bombs Paris.
- 1940 – Franz Rademacher proposes plans to make Madagascar the "Jewish homeland", an idea that had first been considered by 19th century journalist Theodor Herzl.
- 1941 – World War II: The Wehrmacht razes the Greek village of Kandanos to the ground and murders 180 of its inhabitants.
- 1942 – World War II: Japan begins the Aleutian Islands Campaign by bombing Unalaska Island.
- 1943 – In Los Angeles, California, white U.S. Navy sailors and Marines attack Latino youths in the five-day Zoot Suit Riots.
- 1950 – Herzog and Lachenal of the French Annapurna expedition become the first climbers to reach the summit of an 8,000-metre peak.
- 1962 – At Paris Orly Airport, Air France Flight 007 overruns the runway and explodes when the crew attempts to abort takeoff, killing 130.
- 1963 – Soldiers of the South Vietnamese Army attack protesting Buddhists in Huế with liquid chemicals from tear-gas grenades, causing 67 people to be hospitalized for blistering of the skin and respiratory ailments.
- 1965 – The launch of Gemini 4, the first multi-day space mission by a NASA crew. Ed White, a crew member, performs the first American spacewalk.
- 1969 – Melbourne-Evans collision: Off the coast of South Vietnam, the Australian aircraft carrier HMAS Melbourne cuts the U.S. Navy destroyer USS Frank E. Evans in half, resulting in 74 deaths.
- 1973 – A Soviet supersonic Tupolev Tu-144 crashes near Goussainville, France, killing 14, the first crash of a supersonic passenger aircraft.
- 1979 – A blowout at the Ixtoc I oil well in the southern Gulf of Mexico causes at least 3,000,000 barrels (480,000 m^{3}) of oil to be spilled into the waters, the second-worst accidental oil spill ever recorded.
- 1980 – The 1980 Grand Island tornado outbreak hits Nebraska, United States, causing five deaths and $300 million (equivalent to $1172 million in 2025) worth of damage.
- 1982 – The Israeli ambassador to the United Kingdom, Shlomo Argov, is shot on a London street; he survives but is left paralysed.
- 1984 – Operation Blue Star, a military offensive, is launched by the Indian government at Harmandir Sahib, also known as the Golden Temple, the holiest shrine for Sikhs, in Amritsar. The operation continues until June 6, with casualties, most of them civilians, in excess of 5,000.
- 1989 – The government of China sends troops to force protesters out of Tiananmen Square after seven weeks of occupation.
- 1991 – Mount Unzen erupts in Kyūshū, Japan, killing 43 people, all of them either researchers or journalists.
- 1992 – Australian Aboriginal land rights are recognised in Mabo v Queensland (No 2), a case brought by Torres Strait Islander Eddie Mabo which led to the Native Title Act 1993 overturning the long-held colonial assumption of terra nullius.
- 1998 – After suffering a mechanical failure, a high speed train derails at Eschede, Germany, killing 101 people.
- 2006 – The union of Serbia and Montenegro comes to an end with Montenegro's formal declaration of independence.
- 2012 – A plane carrying 153 people crashes in a residential neighborhood in Lagos, Nigeria, killing everyone on board plus six people on the ground.
- 2012 – The pageant for the Diamond Jubilee of Elizabeth II takes place on the River Thames.
- 2013 – The trial of United States Army private Chelsea Manning for leaking classified material to WikiLeaks begins in Fort Meade, Maryland.
- 2013 – At least 119 people are killed in a fire at a poultry farm in Jilin Province in northeastern China.
- 2019 – Khartoum massacre: In Sudan, over 100 people are killed when security forces accompanied by Janjaweed militiamen storm and open fire on a sit-in protest.
- 2025 – Reconstitution of the Academy of the Distrustful in the Sala Dalmases of the Historical Archive of the City of Barcelona in Barcelona.

== Births ==
=== Pre-1600 ===
- 1139 – Conon of Naso, Basilian abbot (died 1236)
- 1421 – Giovanni di Cosimo de' Medici, Italian noble (died 1463)
- 1454 – Bogislaw X, Duke of Pomerania (1474–1523) (died 1523)
- 1537 – João Manuel, Prince of Portugal (died 1554)
- 1540 – Charles II, Archduke of Austria (died 1590)
- 1554 – Pietro de' Medici, Italian noble (died 1604)
- 1576 – Giovanni Diodati, Swiss-Italian minister, theologian, and academic (died 1649)

=== 1601–1900 ===
- 1635 – Philippe Quinault, French playwright and composer (died 1688)
- 1636 – John Hale, American minister (died 1700)
- 1659 – David Gregory, Scottish-English mathematician and astronomer (died 1708)
- 1723 – Giovanni Antonio Scopoli, Italian physician, geologist, and botanist (died 1788)
- 1726 – James Hutton, Scottish geologist and physician (died 1797)
- 1736 – Ignaz Fränzl, German violinist and composer (died 1811)
- 1770 – Manuel Belgrano, Argentinian economist, lawyer, and politician (died 1820)
- 1771 – Sydney Smith, English preacher and author (died 1845)
- 1808 – Jefferson Davis, American colonel and politician, President of the Confederate States of America from 1861 - 1865 (died 1889)
- 1817 – Princess Clémentine of Orléans(died 1907)
- 1818 – Louis Faidherbe, French general and politician, Governor of Senegal (died 1889)
- 1819 – Anton Anderledy, Swiss religious leader, 23rd Superior General of the Society of Jesus (died 1892)
- 1819 – Johan Jongkind, Dutch painter (died 1891)
- 1819 – Magdalene Thoresen, Danish writer (died 1903)
- 1832 – Charles Lecocq, French pianist and composer (died 1918)
- 1843 – Frederick VIII of Denmark (died 1912)
- 1844 – Garret Hobart, American lawyer and politician, 24th Vice President of the United States (died 1899)
- 1844 – Detlev von Liliencron, German poet and author (died 1909)
- 1852 – Theodore Robinson, American painter and academic (died 1896)
- 1853 – Flinders Petrie, English archaeologist and academic (died 1942)
- 1864 – Otto Erich Hartleben, German poet and playwright (died 1905)
- 1864 – Ransom E. Olds, American businessman, founded Oldsmobile and REO Motor Car Company (died 1950)
- 1865 – George V of the United Kingdom (died 1936)
- 1866 – George Howells Broadhurst, English-American director and manager (died 1952)
- 1873 – Otto Loewi, German-American pharmacologist and psychobiologist, Nobel Prize laureate (died 1961)
- 1877 – Raoul Dufy, French painter and illustrator (died 1953)
- 1879 – Alla Nazimova, Ukrainian-American actress, producer, and screenwriter (died 1945)
- 1879 – Raymond Pearl, American biologist and botanist (died 1940)
- 1879 – Vivian Woodward, English footballer and soldier (died 1954)
- 1881 – Mikhail Larionov, Russian painter and set designer (died 1964)
- 1890 – Baburao Painter, Indian actor, director, producer, and screenwriter (died 1954)
- 1897 – Memphis Minnie, American singer-songwriter (died 1973)
- 1899 – Georg von Békésy, Hungarian-American biophysicist and academic, Nobel Prize laureate (died 1972)
- 1900 – Adelaide Ames, American astronomer and academic (died 1932)
- 1900 – Leo Picard, German-Israeli geologist and academic (died 1997)

=== 1901–present ===
- 1901 – Maurice Evans, English actor (died 1989)
- 1901 – Zhang Xueliang, Chinese general and warlord (died 2001)
- 1903 – Eddie Acuff, American actor (died 1956)
- 1904 – Charles R. Drew, American physician and surgeon (died 1950)
- 1904 – Jan Peerce, American tenor and actor (died 1984)
- 1905 – Martin Gottfried Weiss, German SS officer, commandant of the Dachau concentration camp, executed war criminal (died 1946)
- 1906 – R. G. D. Allen, English economist, mathematician, and statistician (died 1983)
- 1906 – Josephine Baker, French actress, singer, and dancer; French Resistance operative (died 1975)
- 1907 – Paul Rotha, English director and producer (died 1984)
- 1910 – Paulette Goddard, American actress and model (died 1990)
- 1910 – Wilfred Thesiger, British military officer, explorer, and writer (died 2003)
- 1911 – Ellen Corby, American actress and screenwriter (died 1999)
- 1914 – Ignacio Ponseti, Spanish physician and orthopedist (died 2009)
- 1917 – Leo Gorcey, American actor (died 1969)
- 1918 – Patrick Cargill, English actor and producer (died 1996)
- 1918 – Lili St. Cyr, American burlesque dancer (died 1999)
- 1921 – Forbes Carlile, Australian pentathlete and coach (died 2016)
- 1922 – Alain Resnais, French director, cinematographer, and screenwriter (died 2014)
- 1923 – Igor Shafarevich, Russian mathematician and theorist (died 2017)
- 1924 – Karunanidhi, Indian screenwriter and politician, 3rd Chief Minister of Tamil Nadu (died 2018)
- 1924 – Colleen Dewhurst, Canadian-American actress (died 1991)
- 1924 – Jimmy Rogers, American singer and guitarist (died 1997)
- 1924 – Torsten Wiesel, Swedish neurophysiologist and academic, Nobel Prize laureate
- 1925 – Tony Curtis, American actor (died 2010)
- 1926 – Allen Ginsberg, American poet (died 1997)
- 1926 – Flora MacDonald, Canadian banker and politician, 10th Canadian Minister of Communications (died 2015)
- 1927 – Boots Randolph, American saxophonist and composer (died 2007)
- 1928 – Donald Judd, American sculptor and painter (died 1994)
- 1928 – John Richard Reid, New Zealand cricketer (died 2020)
- 1929 – Werner Arber, Swiss microbiologist and geneticist, Nobel Prize laureate
- 1930 – Marion Zimmer Bradley, American author and poet (died 1999)
- 1930 – George Fernandes, Indian journalist and politician, Minister of Defence for India (died 2019)
- 1930 – Joe Coulombe, founder of Trader Joe's (died 2020)
- 1931 – Françoise Arnoul, Algerian-French actress (died 2021)
- 1931 – Raúl Castro, Cuban commander and politician, 18th President of Cuba
- 1931 – Lindy Remigino, American runner and coach (died 2018)
- 1931 – Isa bin Salman Al Khalifa, Bahranian king (died 1999)
- 1936 – Larry McMurtry, American novelist and screenwriter (died 2021)
- 1936 – Colin Meads, New Zealand rugby player and coach (died 2017)
- 1937 – Jean-Pierre Jaussaud, French racing driver (died 2021)
- 1940 – Ian Hunter, English singer-songwriter and guitarist
- 1942 – Curtis Mayfield, American singer-songwriter and producer (died 1999)
- 1943 – Billy Cunningham, American basketball player and coach
- 1945 – Hale Irwin, American golfer and architect
- 1945 – Ramon Jacinto, Filipino singer, guitarist, and businessman, founded the Rajah Broadcasting Network
- 1946 – Penelope Wilton, English actress
- 1948 – Jan Reker, Dutch footballer and manager
- 1950 – Frédéric François, Belgian singer-songwriter
- 1950 – Melissa Mathison, American screenwriter and producer (died 2015)
- 1950 – Suzi Quatro, American-English singer-songwriter and guitarist
- 1951 – Jill Biden, American educator, First Lady of the United States
- 1951 – Deniece Williams, American singer-songwriter
- 1954 – Dan Hill, Canadian singer-songwriter
- 1955 – Louis H. Schiff, retired American judge, law school professor.
- 1956 – George Burley, Scottish footballer and manager
- 1956 – Danny Wilde, American singer-songwriter and guitarist
- 1959 – Sam Mills, American football player (died 2005)
- 1960 – Jeff Colyer, American politician, 47th Governor of Kansas
- 1960 – Catherine Davani, first female Papua New Guinean judge (died 2016)
- 1960 – Tracy Grimshaw, Australian television host
- 1960 – Carl Rackemann, Australian cricketer and sportscaster
- 1961 – Lawrence Lessig, American lawyer, academic, and author, founded the Creative Commons
- 1961 – Peter Vidmar, American gymnast
- 1962 – Susannah Constantine, English fashion designer, journalist, and author
- 1964 – Kerry King, American guitarist and songwriter
- 1965 – Mike Gordon, American bassist and vocalist
- 1965 – Hans Kroes, Dutch swimmer
- 1965 – Tina Kaidanow, American diplomat and government official (died 2024)
- 1966 – Wasim Akram, Pakistani cricketer, coach, and sportscaster
- 1966 – Bill Callahan, American singer-songwriter
- 1967 – Anderson Cooper, American journalist and author
- 1967 – Tamás Darnyi, Hungarian swimmer
- 1967 – Newton, English singer-songwriter
- 1969 – Takako Minekawa, Japanese singer-songwriter
- 1969 – Hiroyuki Takami, Japanese singer and actor
- 1971 – John Hodgman, American humorist
- 1972 – Julie Gayet, French actress
- 1974 – Kelly Jones, Welsh singer-songwriter and guitarist
- 1974 – Serhiy Rebrov, Ukrainian international footballer and manager
- 1975 – Jose Molina, Puerto Rican baseball player
- 1976 – Jamie McMurray, American race car driver
- 1977 – Cris, Brazilian footballer
- 1977 – Travis Hafner, American baseball player
- 1979 – Pierre Poilievre, Canadian politician, Leader of the Opposition
- 1980 – Amauri, Italian international footballer
- 1981 – Sosene Anesi, New Zealand rugby player
- 1981 – Sam Murphy, Australian rugby league player
- 1982 – Yelena Isinbayeva, Russian pole vaulter
- 1982 – Manfred Mölgg, Italian skier
- 1983 – Pasquale Foggia, Italian footballer
- 1985 – Papiss Cissé, Senegalese footballer
- 1985 – Łukasz Piszczek, Polish footballer
- 1986 – Micah Kogo, Kenyan runner
- 1986 – Rafael Nadal, Spanish tennis player
- 1986 – Tomáš Verner, Czech ice skater
- 1987 – Masami Nagasawa, Japanese actress
- 1989 – Katie Hoff, American swimmer
- 1989 – Imogen Poots, English actress and model
- 1991 – Yordano Ventura, Dominican baseball player (died 2017)
- 1992 – Dilraba Dilmurat, Chinese actress
- 1992 – Mario Götze, German footballer
- 1992 - Jade Cargill, American professional wrestler
- 1993 – Otto Porter Jr., American basketball player
- 1994 – Harrison Bader, American baseball player
- 1997 – Louis Hofmann, German actor
- 1998 – Sam Curran, English cricketer
- 1999 – Cameron Green, Australian cricketer
- 1999 – Dzhem Yamenov, Bulgarian politician
- 2000 – Beabadoobee, Filipino singer-songwriter
- 2001 – Jalen Suggs, American basketball player
- 2002 – Tyrell Sloan, Australian rugby league player
- 2005 – Désiré Doué, French footballer
- 2011 – Yağız Kaan Erdoğmuş, Turkish chess prodigy and grandmaster

== Deaths ==
=== Pre-1600 ===
- 628 – Liang Shidu, Chinese rebel leader
- 734 – Simeon of the Olives, Syriac bishop of Harran
- 800 – Staurakios, Byzantine general
- 1052 – Prince Guaimar IV of Salerno
- 1397 – William de Montagu, 2nd Earl of Salisbury, English commander (born 1328)
- 1411 – Leopold IV, Duke of Austria (born 1371)
- 1453 – Loukas Notaras, last megas doux of the Byzantine Empire
- 1511 – Ahmad ibn Abi Jum'ah, Islamic scholar, author of the Oran fatwa
- 1548 – Juan de Zumárraga, Spanish-Mexican archbishop (born 1468)
- 1553 – Wolf Huber, Austrian painter, printmaker and architect (born 1485)
- 1594 – John Aylmer, English bishop and scholar (born 1521)

=== 1601–1900 ===
- 1615 – Sanada Yukimura, Japanese samurai (born 1567)
- 1640 – Theophilus Howard, 2nd Earl of Suffolk, English politician, Lord Warden of the Cinque Ports (born 1584)
- 1649 – Manuel de Faria e Sousa, Portuguese historian and poet (born 1590)
- 1657 – William Harvey, English physician and academic (born 1578)
- 1659 – Morgan Llwyd, Welsh minister and poet (born 1619)
- 1780 – Thomas Hutchinson, American businessman and politician, Governor of the Province of Massachusetts Bay (born 1711)
- 1826 – Nikolay Karamzin, Russian historian and poet (born 1766)
- 1858 – Julius Reubke, German pianist and composer (born 1834)
- 1861 – Stephen A. Douglas, American lawyer and politician, 7th Secretary of State of Illinois (born 1813)
- 1865 – Okada Izō, Japanese samurai (born 1838)
- 1875 – Georges Bizet, French pianist and composer (born 1838)
- 1877 – Ludwig Ritter von Köchel, Austrian botanist, composer, and publisher (born 1800)
- 1882 – Christian Wilberg, German painter and illustrator (born 1839)
- 1894 – Karl Eduard Zachariae von Lingenthal, German lawyer and jurist (born 1812)
- 1899 – Johann Strauss II, Austrian composer and educator (born 1825)
- 1900 – Mary Kingsley, English explorer and author (born 1862)

=== 1901–present ===
- 1902 – Vital-Justin Grandin, French-Canadian bishop and missionary (born 1829)
- 1906 – John Maxwell, American golfer (born 1871)
- 1921 – Coenraad Hiebendaal, Dutch rower and physician (born 1879)
- 1924 – Franz Kafka, Czech-Austrian lawyer and author (born 1883)
- 1928 – Li Yuanhong, Chinese general and politician, 2nd President of the Republic of China (born 1864)
- 1933 – William Muldoon, American wrestler (born 1852)
- 1938 – John Flanagan, Irish-American hammer thrower and tug of war competitor (born 1873)
- 1946 – Mikhail Kalinin, Russian civil servant and politician (born 1875)
- 1963 – Edmond Decottignies, French weightlifter (born 1893)
- 1963 – Pope John XXIII (born 1881)
- 1963 – Nâzım Hikmet, Turkish poet, author, and playwright (born 1902)
- 1963 – Samuel Rocke, Australian politician who served as an independent member of the Legislative Assembly of Western Australia (born 1874)
- 1964 – Kâzım Orbay, Turkish general and politician, 9th Turkish Speaker of the Parliament (born 1887)
- 1964 – Frans Eemil Sillanpää, Finnish author and academic, Nobel Prize laureate (born 1888)
- 1969 – George Edwin Cooke, American soccer player (born 1883)
- 1970 – Hjalmar Schacht, Danish-German economist, banker, and politician (born 1877)
- 1971 – Heinz Hopf, German-Swiss mathematician and academic (born 1894)
- 1973 – Jean Batmale, French footballer and manager (born 1895)
- 1974 – Michael Gaughan, Irish Republican died on hunger strike (born 1949)
- 1975 – Ozzie Nelson, American actor and bandleader (born 1906)
- 1975 – Eisaku Satō, Japanese and politician, Prime Minister of Japan (born 1901)
- 1977 – Archibald Hill, English physiologist and politician, Nobel Prize laureate (born 1886)
- 1977 – Roberto Rossellini, Italian director and screenwriter (born 1906)
- 1981 – Carleton S. Coon, American anthropologist and academic (born 1904)
- 1986 – Anna Neagle, English actress and singer (born 1904)
- 1987 – Will Sampson, American actor and painter (born 1933)
- 1989 – Ruhollah Khomeini, Iranian religious leader and politician, 1st Supreme Leader of Iran (born 1900)
- 1990 – Robert Noyce, American physicist and businessman, co-founded the Intel Corporation (born 1927)
- 1991 – Brian Bevan, Australian rugby league player (born 1924)
- 1991 – Katia Krafft, French volcanologist and geologist (born 1942)
- 1991 – Maurice Krafft, French volcanologist and geologist (born 1946)
- 1991 – Lê Văn Thiêm, Vietnamese mathematician and academic (born 1918)
- 1992 – Robert Morley, English actor and screenwriter (born 1908)
- 1993 – Yeoh Ghim Seng, Singaporean politician, acting President of Singapore (born 1918)
- 1994 – Puig Aubert, German-French rugby player and coach (born 1925)
- 1997 – Dennis James, American actor and game show host (born 1917)
- 2001 – Anthony Quinn, Mexican-American actor and producer (born 1915)
- 2002 – Lew Wasserman, American talent agent and manager (born 1913)
- 2003 – Felix de Weldon, Austrian-American sculptor, designed the Marine Corps War Memorial (born 1907)
- 2005 – Harold Cardinal, Canadian lawyer and politician (born 1945)
- 2006 – Clinton Jones, American Episcopal priest and gay rights activist (born 1916)
- 2009 – David Carradine, American actor (born 1936)
- 2009 – Koko Taylor, American singer (born 1928)
- 2010 – Rue McClanahan, American actress (born 1934)
- 2011 – James Arness, American actor and producer (born 1923)
- 2011 – Andrew Gold, American singer, songwriter, musician and arranger (born 1951)
- 2011 – Bhajan Lal, Indian politician, 6th Chief Minister of Haryana (born 1930)
- 2011 – Jack Kevorkian, American pathologist, author, and activist (born 1928)
- 2011 – Jan van Roessel, Dutch footballer (born 1925)
- 2012 – Carol Ann Abrams, American producer, author, and academic (born 1942)
- 2012 – Roy Salvadori, English racing driver and manager (born 1922)
- 2012 – Brian Talboys, New Zealand journalist and politician, 7th Deputy Prime Minister of New Zealand (born 1921)
- 2013 – Atul Chitnis, German-Indian technologist and journalist (born 1962)
- 2013 – Józef Czyrek, Polish economist and politician, Polish Minister of Foreign Affairs (born 1928)
- 2013 – Frank Lautenberg, American soldier and politician (born 1924)
- 2014 – Svyatoslav Belza, Russian journalist, author, and critic (born 1942)
- 2014 – Gopinath Munde, Indian politician, 3rd Deputy Chief Minister of Maharashtra (born 1949)
- 2015 – Avi Beker, Israeli political scientist and academic (born 1951)
- 2016 – Muhammad Ali, American boxer (born 1942)
- 2021 – F. Lee Bailey, American attorney (born 1933)
- 2024 – Brigitte Bierlein, former Austrian chancellor (born 1949)
- 2024 – William Russell, English actor (born 1924)
- 2025 – Jim Marshall, American football player (born 1937)
- 2025 – Shigeo Nagashima, Japanese baseball player and manager (born 1936)
- 2025 – Edmund White, American novelist, memoirist and essayist (born 1940)

== Holidays and observances ==
- Christian feast day:
  - Charles Lwanga and Companions (Roman Catholic Church), and its related observances:
    - Martyrs' Day (Uganda)
  - Clotilde
  - Blessed Francis Ingleby
  - Juan Grande Román
  - Kevin of Glendalough
  - Ovidius
  - Vladimirskaya (Russian Orthodox)
  - June 3 (Eastern Orthodox liturgics)
- Confederate Memorial Day (Kentucky, and Tennessee, United States)
- Economist day (Buenos Aires, Argentina)
- Mabo Day (Australia)
- Opium Suppression Movement Day (Taiwan)
- World Bicycle Day
