= Equality Connecticut =

- US State of Connecticut
- Founded: 2022
- Location: Hartford, Connecticut
- Region served: Connecticut
- Key people: Matt Blinstrubas, executive director
- Website: eqct.org

Equality Connecticut is a statewide political advocacy organization in Connecticut that advocates for lesbian, gay, bisexual, transgender, and queer (LGBTQ) rights.

== History ==
Equality Connecticut was formed in 2022, in order to create a statewide lobbying network on behalf of Connecticut's LGBTQ community.

== Structure ==
Equality Connecticut is a member of Social and Environmental Entrepreneurs, 501(c)(3) nonprofit organization working on charitable, scientific, and educational efforts to promote human rights.

== Activities ==
Equality Connecticut engages in political lobbying on LGBT issues, with the stated goal of advancing the rights, health, history, and culture of the LGBTQIA+ community. Long-term priorities of the organization include the expansion of state suicide prevention programs to be more LGBTQ inclusive, the support of legislation to ensure the coverage of fertility care for LGBTQ people, the support of the state's LGBTQ Health and Human Services Committee Advocate and fundraising for the creation of a Connecticut AIDS memorial in Hartford.

== See also ==
- LGBT rights in Connecticut
- List of LGBT rights organizations
- Same-sex marriage in Connecticut
