= Reial Acadèmia de Bones Lletres de Barcelona =

Catalan literary society, based in Barcelona

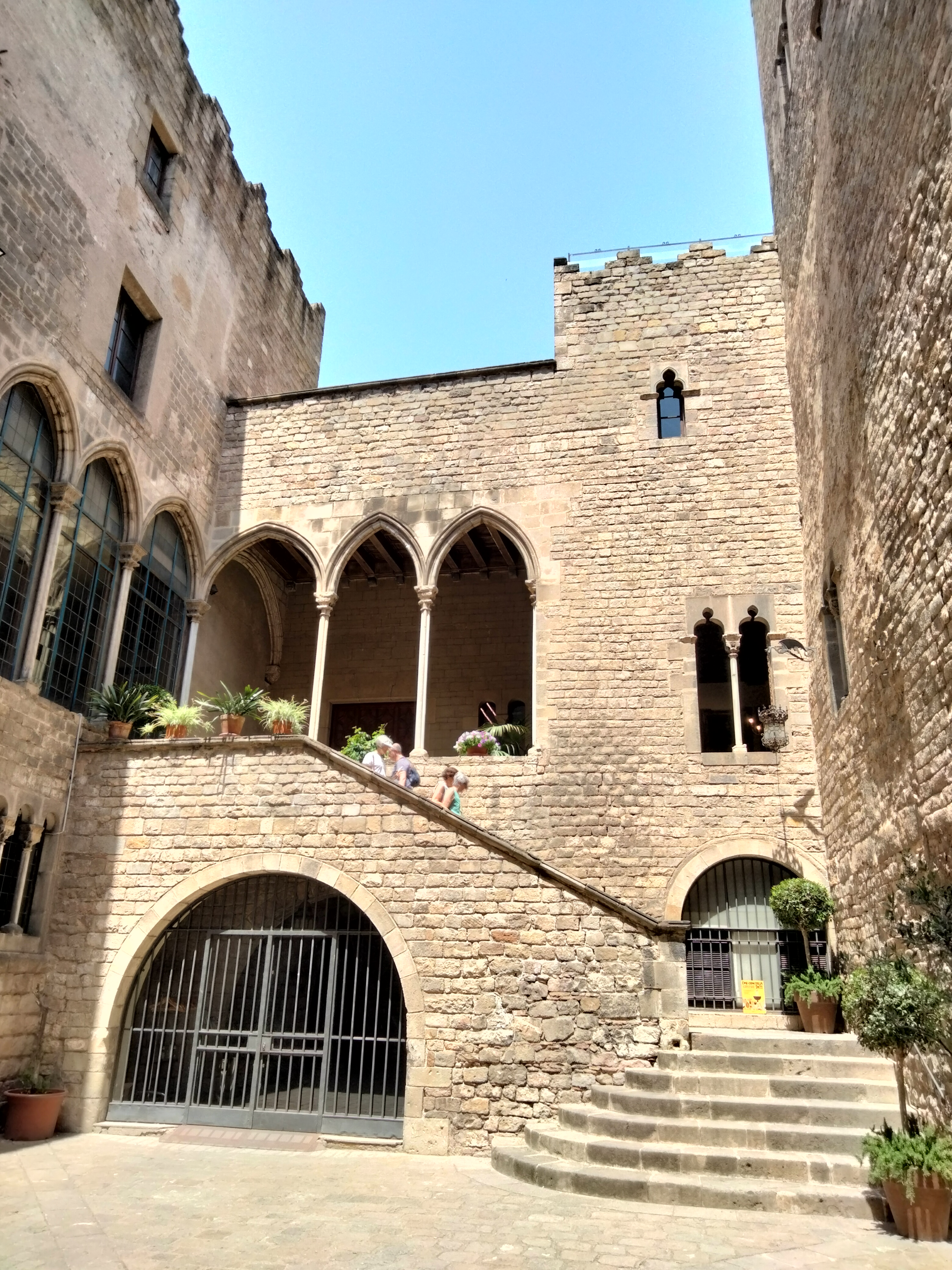
The Palau Requesens in Barcelona, headquarters of the Academy.

The Reial Acadèmia de Bones Lletres de Barcelona (in Spanish Real Academia de Buenas Letras de Barcelona, Royal Academy of the Good Writings of Barcelona) is a Catalan literary society, based in Barcelona. It was founded in 1729 and it has its headquarters since 1902 in the Palau Requesens in Barcelona's Gothic Quarter.

== History ==
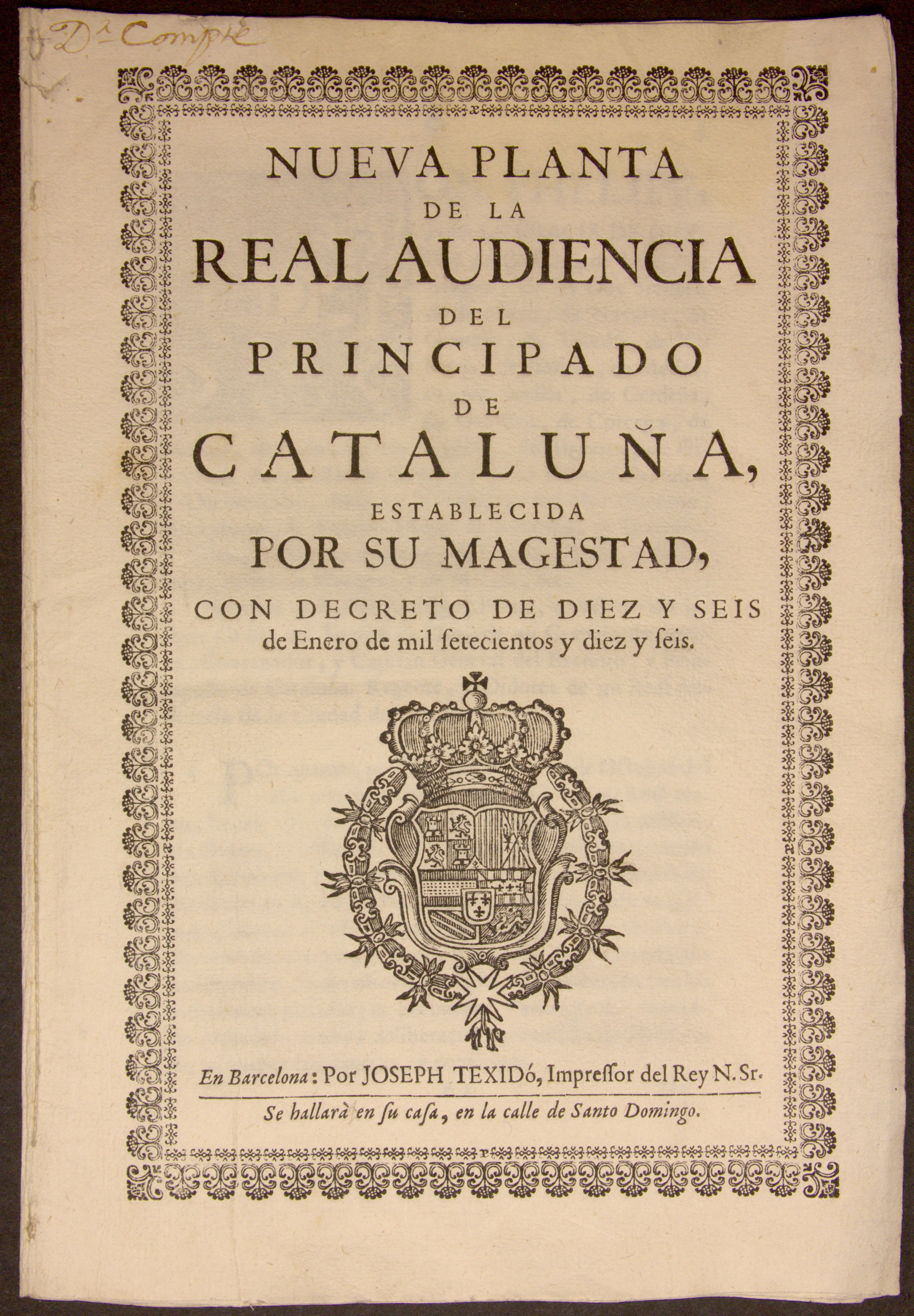
As a result of the Decretos de Nueva Planta all Catalan universities were closed and a unique university for Catalonia was set in Cervera.

The Reial Acadèmia de Bones Lletres was founded in 1729 by a group of intellectuals from Barcelona. This institution should continue the tradition of the Acadèmia dels Desconfiats (Academy of the Distrustful). The aim of this society was the study of Catalan history, language and poetry. The founders were afraid of the negative impact of the displacement of the Catalan universities towards Cervera, which already lasted around 15 years by that year.

The University of Barcelona was closed in 1715, together with the rest of Catalan universities (Tarragona, Girona, Solsona, Vic and Lleida) as a result of the Nueva Planta Decrees. As an acknowledgement for the support that the city of Cervera had given him during the Spanish War of Succession, Philip V concentrated all Catalan universities in one. And it lasted for the following 150 years in Catalonia.

In 1752 the Reial Acadèmia de Bones Lletres got the title of royal academy, which was bestowed by Ferdinand VI. As in other royal academies, the work of the Reial Acadèmia de Bones Lletres was limited to a specific field, in this case language and literature. One of the first tasks of this academy was the compilation of a Catalan dictionary.

During the three years of the Trienio Liberal, when there was a higher degree of political freedom, which lasted from 1820 until 1823 with the French invasion of Spain, new members with new ideas came to the Academy, such as Bonaventura Carles Aribau.

Since the 1850s the Reial Acadèmia de Bones Lletres became one of the most dynamic cultural institutions of Catalonia. So it got five professorships, and it helped to make possible in 1837 the return of the University to Barcelona. Many of the most important personalities of the Renaixença were amongst its members, such as for instance Jacint Verdaguer.

During the whole 19th century the Academy practised multilingualism, even though the main language was Castilian. Nonetheless in 1841 and 1857 it held two poetry contests, that are usually considered as the first steps towards the beginning of the Floral Games in Catalan in 1859.

Since 1901 it publishes a yearly bulletin.
