= Dzhem Yamenov =

Bulgarian politician (born 1999)

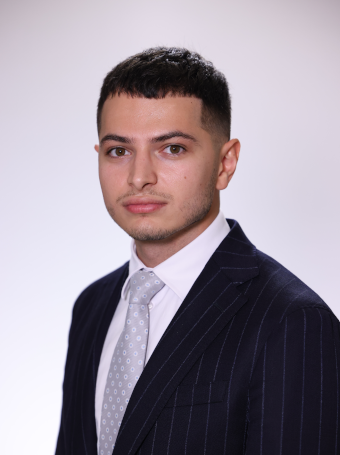
- Yamenov in 2024

Member of the National Assembly
- Incumbent
- Assumed office 19 June 2024
- Constituency: Targovishte

Personal details
- Born: 3 June 1999 (age 26)
- Party: DPS – New Beginning
- Relatives: Hamdi Iliyazov (grandfather)

Dzhem Yamen Yamenov (Bulgarian: Джем Ямен Яменов; born 3 June 1999) is a Bulgarian politician serving as a member of the National Assembly since 2024. He is the grandson of Hamdi Iliyazov.
