= Murder of Richard Reihl =

1988 murder of a gay man in Connecticut, United States

On May 15, 1988, Wethersfield, Connecticut resident Richard Reihl, a gay man, was murdered by two teenagers. Reihl's murder has been cited as a watershed moment for the LGBT community in Connecticut since his killing led to the passing of hate-crime legislation in the state.

== Background ==
Richard Reihl was 33 years old and lived in Wethersfield, Connecticut. He had attended Boston University, where he earned a degree in computers. At the time of his death, he was studying for a master's degree in Business Administration at the University of Hartford. He worked as an insurance analyst for Aetna, and also taught Economics at Hartford's Fox Middle School. His friends and family recalled him as a positive role model who was interested in photography.

The day before Reihl's murder, 16-year-old Marcos Perez and 17-year-old Sean Burke robbed a gay man in West Hartford with the help of two other accomplices. Burke had already been implicated in four other crimes, and was involved with a group that planned to assault gay men.

== Murder ==
When leaving Chez Est, a gay bar in Hartford, Reihl met Marcos Perez and Sean Burke, in the bar's parking lot. He invited the two to his home in Wethersfield and the boys accepted. At Reihl's home, the boys assaulted him, with Burke trying to hit Reihl with a fireplace log. Reihl tried to escape and gave the boys money to save himself. The two boys proceeded to duct-tape his mouth and hands and continued to beat him. They left briefly and returned to make sure Reihl was dead.

Reihl's body was later discovered by two newspaper carriers.

== Aftermath ==
On June 3, 1988, Marcos Perez confessed that he and Burke had murdered Reihl. The two turned themselves in, and both Perez and Burke pled guilty, with Burke pleading under the Alford doctrine.

During the trial, Burke's defense lawyer attempted to lessen his sentence to 25 years by citing Burke's incarcerated father and "homophobia amongst most young people" as contributing factors to the murder. The court rejected these arguments. Superior Court Judge Raymond R. Norko, when imposing the sentence, told Burke that he was "a person who has destroyed a wonderful life, a person, Sean, I wish you would have become, who you could have looked up to".

In late 1989, both Perez and Burke were convicted and sentenced to 35-40 years of prison time. In 2006, Supreme Court judge Raymond Norko reduced Burke's 40-year sentence by 5 years, on account of "good behaviour," thus making him eligible for release in 2017. Perez died in 2015, from a drug overdose.

== Legacy ==
Reihl's murder incited Connecticut's LGBT community to activism. Within three weeks of Reihl's death, the Connecticut Lesbian and Gay Anti-Violence Project was formed. LGBT community members sat in on the court hearings in the case, to be able to challenge any homophobia that might have arisen during the proceedings. Community members pushed for the state to pass hate crime legislation that would include sexual orientation as a protected class. The Anti-Violence Project documented more than 250 incidents of anti-gay violence as evidence for the need for protective legislation.

in 1990, Connecticut passed a hate crime law that included sexual orientation in its list of protected classes. The following year, the state's General Assembly passed a bill that prohibited discrimination based on sexual orientation in credit rating, education, employment, and housing.

In 2019, Connecticut passed a bill banning the gay panic defense.
