= Kalos Society =

Gay support and advocacy group

The Kalos Society was a gay support and advocacy group founded in Bridgeport, Connecticut which was active from 1968 until 1973.

== History ==
The Kalos Society was formed in 1968 by Keith Brown, Harry Williams, and Ken Laughlin. It grew out of a counseling group for LGBT people, Project H, which had been started by Canon Clinton R. Jones in 1963. The group met at Hartford's Christ Church Cathedral, on invitation of Jones, for their first few meetings. The group's name was drawn from the Greek word kalos, an adjective with positive connotations that was said to be inscribed on drinking bowls gifted by men to other men in ancient Greece.

Initially there were some tensions between group members as to whether the group should be primarily social and counselling-based, or be focused on political advocacy. The focus on political advocacy eventually won out, and in mid-1970 the group merged with the local branch of the Gay Liberation Front, which had been founded earlier that year.

In 1970, the group received backlash for a public picnic they held at Goodwin Park. Residents of Hartford's South End had gathered 400 signatures on a petition opposing the event. Following the event, city officials passed an ordinance requiring a permit for speeches made in public parks.

In 1971, the group organized the Connecticut Liberation Festival, the state's first pride festival. The festival had events over the course of several days, which included dances, picnics, and a march to the state capitol. On July 30, 1971, the group organized a protest of roughly 170 people at Bridgeport City Hall, in response to police refusal to help a Kalos Society member after they were assaulted. In September 1971, the group demonstrated at the LaRosa Park West bar in Hartford, which refused to serve lesbian patrons who were not dressed "properly". Eleven protesters were arrested, but demonstrations continued for several days until the bar's owners relented.

1971 also saw member Ken Bland suspended from his job at the American School for the Deaf after he represented the Kalos Society on a local television program. The American Civil Liberties Union later took up Bland's case, and in 1972, the group backed a state-level bill that would outlaw discrimination based on sexual orientation.

In 1973, the group merged with the Metropolitan Community Church in Hartford. Many of the group's members went on to be involved with the Connecticut Coalition for Lesbian and Gay Civil Rights between 1984 and 1991. One notable member of the Kalos Society was Richard Cardarelli, a Franciscan monk who had been excommunicated for advocating for the acceptance of gay members in the Catholic Church.

== The Griffin ==
Beginning in 1970, the Kalos Society published a newsletter, titled The Griffin and subtitled "News of Gay Liberation", which was distributed at local gay bars and at stores with owners sympathetic to the cause of gay liberation. The publication was the state's first LGBT newspaper, and covered topics such as Kalos Society demonstrations, news on local elections, and information about STIs and sex education. The newsletter also published news of other leftist movements, such as the Black Panthers.

The Griffin later evolved into Metroline, a magazine which was published from 1982 to 2007. Issues of The Griffin are held at Northeastern University and Northwestern University.
