= 2022 in LGBTQ rights =

This is a list of notable events in the history of LGBTQ rights that took place in the year 2022.

== Events ==
=== January ===
- 1 – In Switzerland, a law allowing simple gender change without a sex reassignment surgery goes into effect.
- 7 – In Canada, a ban on conversion therapy goes into effect.
- 10 – In Greece, the 45-year total ban on blood donation by men who have sex with men is eliminated. No deferral period is required for donation.
- 11 – In Israel, a court ruling legalizing commercial surrogacy for gay male couples goes into effect after The Knesset fails to take action in the allotted six-month time period.
- 22 – In India, the State Government of Tamil Nadu amended the States' Subordinate Police Officers' Conduct Rules, explicitly prohibiting police officers from harassing the LGBTQIA+ community and individuals working for their welfare, making it the first Indian state to enforce penalties against police officers for such actions.

=== February ===
- 14 – Israel's Health Ministry announces a ban on conversion therapy by medical professionals, including punitive measures for violators.
- 15 – In New Zealand, Parliament passes a ban on conversion therapy on person under age of 18 years or lacking decision-making capacity. Additionally, it bans conversion practice that causes serious harm for all age groups.
- 17 – Kuwait's Constitutional Court struck down a contentious law that has long been used to criminalize transgender people by forbidding the "imitation of the opposite sex."
- 17 – India's Ministry of Social Justice and Empowerment announces that gender-affirming healthcare will be covered by insurance in the nation.

=== March ===
- 1 – In Colombia, the Constitutional Court of Colombia ruled in favor to allow non-binary people to have their gender legally recognized.
- 10 – In Chile, same-sex marriage comes into effect.
- 16 – In France, the deferral period on blood donations for men who have sex with men is eliminated.
- 31 – In Ireland, the deferral period on blood donations for men who have sex with men as well as their female partners is reduced from one year to four months.
- 31 – The United States announces an overhaul of TSA protocols to implement gender-neutral screening at checkpoints.

=== April ===
- 11 – In the United States, passports are issued with a non-binary "X" gender option for the first time.

=== May ===
- 1 – In Lithuania, the deferral period on blood donations for men who have sex with men is eliminated.
- 20 – In Austria, the deferral period on blood donations for men who have sex with men is eliminated.

=== July ===
- 1 – In Switzerland, same-sex marriages come into effect.
- 6 – Antigua and Barbuda legalizes same-sex behaviour.
- 8 – The Constitutional Court published a decision, that found statutory same-sex marriage ban in Slovenia was unconstitutional, and gave Parliament 6 months to remedy the situation, even though the ruling has to be executed immediately in Slovenia.
- 19 - To prevent the loss of the right to same-sex marriage (Note: Before 2022, the right to same-sex marriage wasn't entrenched in legislation and instead rested on the landmark Supreme Court ruling in Obergefell v Hodges. Clarence Thomas' concurrence in Dobbs v Jackson Women's Health Organization, in which he claimed Obergefell should be overturned, led some to believe the right to marry for same-sex couples was at risk), the United States House of Representatives passes in a 267-157 vote the Respect for Marriage Act, which, once made law, would repeal DOMA and protect both same-sex and interracial marriages.
- 21 – The General Council of Andorra allowed same-sex marriages in Andorra. The law comes into effect on 17 February 2023.

=== August ===
- 16 – In India, Supreme Court expanded the definition of family to include "queer relationships" in a landmark decision. The Court held that atypical families are deserving of equal protection under law guaranteed in the Article 14 of the Indian Constitution and benefits available under social welfare legislation.
- 24 – In Chile, a law that equalizes the age of consent enters into force.
- 30 – In Saint Kitts and Nevis same-sex activity is no longer illegal.

=== September ===
- 2 – In India, the National Medical Commission declared providing conversion therapy as "professional misconduct". It empowered the State Medical Councils to take disciplinary action against medical professionals if they provide "conversion therapy".
- 25 – In Cuba, as a result of the 2022 referendum, same-sex marriage and same-sex adoption, among other matters, become legal.

=== October ===
- 1 – In Latvia, the first civil unions for same-sex couples were allowed by Latvian courts.
- 4 – Slovenia legalises same-sex marriage. The parliamentary vote came after a supreme-court decision from July 8, which declared it a constitutional right.
- 11 - On 11 October 2022, the Congress of the State of Mexico voted 49-12 with six abstentions to pass a bill legalizing same-sex marriage and concubinage in State of Mexico. It was published on 1 November 2022, and took effect the next day.
- 19/27 - A same-sex marriage bill was introduced to Congress of Mexican state Tabasco on 12 October 2022 by Deputy José de Jesús Hernández Díaz (MORENA). It was approved by a Congress committee on 17 October with 4 votes in favour and 2 abstentions, and a final vote was scheduled for Wednesday, 19 October. Congress passed the bill on 19 October by 23 votes to 5 with seven abstentions. The law was signed by Governor Carlos Manuel Merino Campos, and published in the official state journal on 26 October, taking effect the next day.
- 26 – Same-sex marriage is legalised in the Mexican state of Tamaulipas.

=== November ===
- 29
  - Singapore's Parliament repealed a ban on consexual sex between men in a 96-3 vote. The law was removed from the books on 27 December 2022, after President Halimah Yacob gave assent to the bill repealing the law.
  - The United States Senate passed an amended version of the Respect for Marriage Act in a 61-36 vote.

=== December ===
- In Russia, a bill making it a crime to spread "gay propaganda" to anyone, regardless of age, was signed into law by President Vladimir Putin.
- 8 - The United States House of Representatives approved the United States Senate's amendment to the Respect for Marriage Act with 258 votes in favor, 169 against and 1 abstention.
- 12 - Barbados legalized same-sex acts by a high court decision.
- 13 - United States President Joe Biden signed the Respect for Marriage Act, officially codifying into federal law the right to marriage for same-sex couples.
- 22
  - The Scottish Parliament passed with 86 votes in favor and 39 against the Gender Recognition Reform (Scotland) Bill, which allows all transgender people 16 or older to legally change their gender by simply signing a declaration, without the need for prior psychological counseling with a therapist.
  - Spain's Congress of Deputies, with 180 votes in favor and 150 against, passed the so-called ley trans, a bill which allows all transgender people 16 or older to legally change their gender by simply signing a declaration, without the need for prior psychological counseling with a therapist, and transgender people aged 12 to 16 to legally change their gender under certain conditions.
