= New Haven Pride Center =

Nonprofit organization

- Founded: 1996; 30 years ago
- Type: Nonprofit organization
- Legal status: 501(c)(3)
- Location: 50 Orange Street, New Haven, Connecticut, United States
- Region served: Greater New Haven
- Website: www.newhavenpridecenter.org

The New Haven Pride Center is an LGBTQ community center serving the population of Greater New Haven.

== History ==
The New Haven Pride Center opened in 1996 following an unsuccessful push for domestic partnership recognition in New Haven and a LGBT needs assessment by master's student John Allen. At its inception, Allen served as the founding director for the organization and its only staff member.

In 2017, the New Haven Pride Center announced its first paid staff member, executive director Patrick Dunn. Over the next several years, the Center continued expanding, reaching eight paid staff roles in 2020.

In 2022, the Center's 501(c)(3) status was revoked after failing to file its required tax forms for three consecutive years. This led to the board's removal of executive director Patrick Dunn and appointment of Juancarlos Soto as acting executive director. The organization stated that it would work to reinstate its nonprofit status. Amidst financial struggles, the Center furloughed eight of its nine staff members and placed the majority of its programs on pause.

In February 2023, the New Haven Pride Center restored its 501(c)(3) status and received $200,000 in relief funding from the state of Connecticut. By the end of the year, the Center announced plans to move to a new, larger, and more visible space.

In January 2024, the Center's new location opened with support from New Haven Mayor Justin Elicker, who proposed $30,000 to support the new space.

== Services ==
The New Haven Pride Center offers services including case management, a food pantry and community closet, affinity groups, art events, and other community programming.

== See also ==
- List of LGBT community centers
