= Academy of the Distrustful =

Spanish baroque literary and musical academy (est. 1700)

- Acadèmia dels Desconfiats or Acadèmia Desconfiada
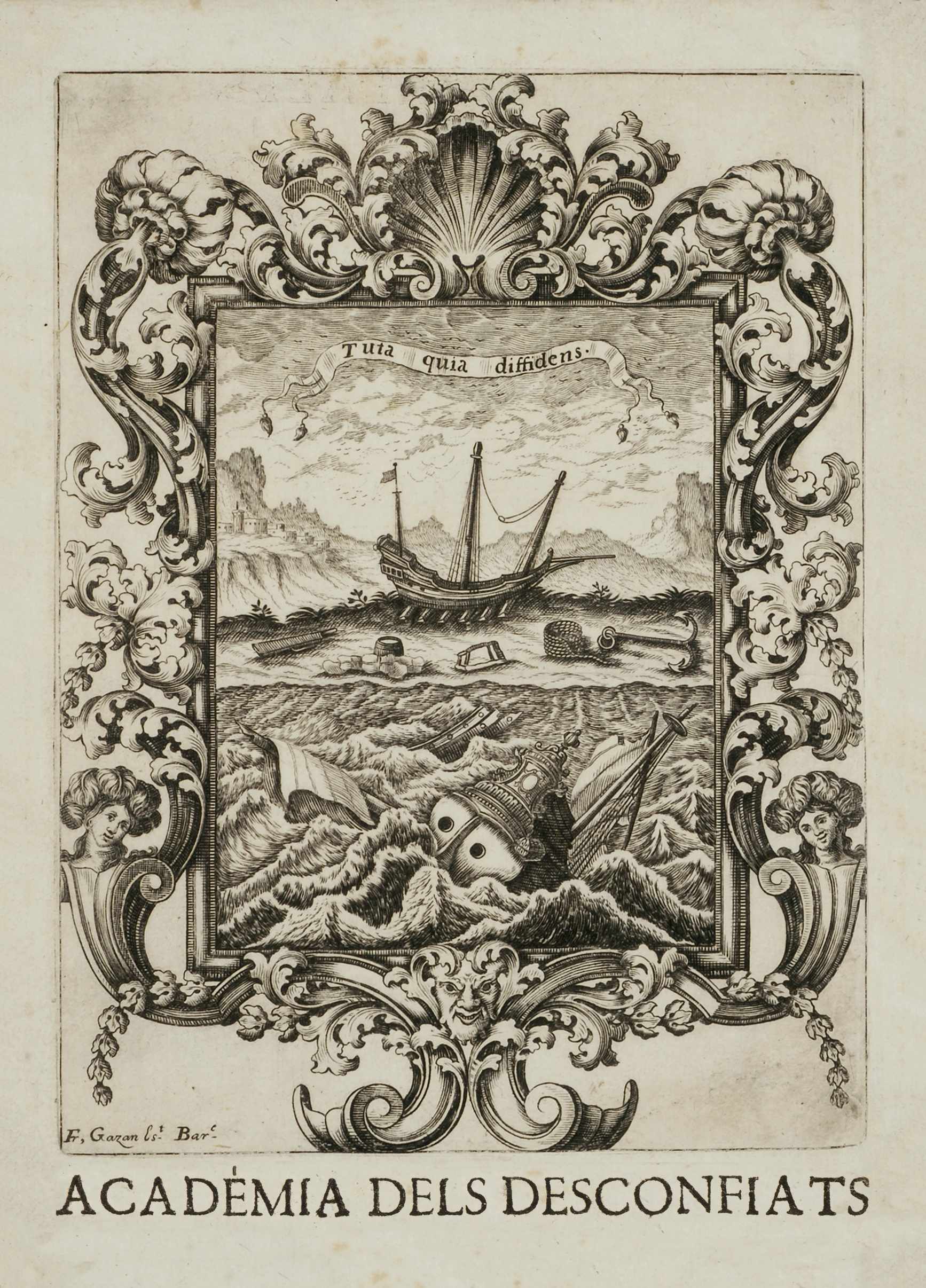
- Emblem of the Academy of the Distrustful
- Formation: 3 June 1700; 326 years ago
- Founder: Pau Ignasi de Dalmases i Ros and thirteen other erudites
- Type: Academy
- Legal status: Association
- Purpose: Humanistic disciplines
- Headquarters: Palau Dalmases (1700-1703), Barcelona, Catalonia, Spain
- Region served: Principality of Catalonia (1700-1703); Autonomous community of Catalonia (2025-)
- Official language: Catalan
- Main organ: General Council
- Website: www.academiadelsdesconfiats.cat
- Remarks: Motto: Tuta quia diffidens ("Secure because distrustful")

The Academy of the Distrustful (Catalan: Acadèmia dels Desconfiats, pronounced [əkəðˈɛmiə ðəlz ðəskuɱfiˈats]), or Distrustful Academy (Catalan: Acadèmia Desconfiada, pronounced [əkəðˈɛmiə ðəskuɱfiˈaðə]), is an academy of letters founded on 3 June 1700 in Barcelona as a Baroque literary and musical association with the aim of promoting the study of classical and Catalan history and poetry, mostly in Spanish, by fourteen scholars headed by the noble Pau Ignasi de Dalmases i Ros. It published the work Nenias reales on the death of Charles II of Spain, and two of its members made the first edition of the works of Francesc Vicent Garcia (Barcelona, 1703), which contains a prologue praising the role of the academy. The poet, soldier and statesman Joan Bonaventura de Gualbes i Copons, although he was not a member, was the author of the same.

It was able to hold its sessions until 1703, leaving to meet in the context of the War of the Spanish Succession. Most of its members ended up supporting Charles III of Austria. It has been claimed that in 1714 it was closed by Philip V of Spain, although there is no document that corroborates it. A few years later the torch was taken by the Academy of Barcelona or Literary Academy of Barcelona, founded in 1729 and refounded in 1752 as the Royal Academy of the Good Letters of Barcelona, currently still active.

On 3 June 2025, on the 325th anniversary of its foundation, it has been reconstituted as a humanities association (in the broadest sense of the term) in the Sala Dalmases of the Historical Archive of the City of Barcelona.

== Distrustful academicians ==
The list of distrustful academicians of the first historical stage of the Academy of the Distrustful (1700–1703) has been made from: its acts (conserved in the Historical Archive of the City of Barcelona); of the "Razón de la obra" of the Nenias reales, its only book (dedicated to the memory of Charles II); and from the final list of its second statutes (dated 1702 or 1703). The relationship of the academicians follows a chronological criterion and respecting the order of appearance in the aforementioned primary documentation. The structure of the list of academicians as well as the reconstitutors have been documented in the Book of the Soul of the Academy of the Distrustful.

=== Founder academicians (on 3 June 1700) ===
1. Joan Antoni de Boixadors i de Pinós (Badalona, 1672 – San Pier d'Arena, Genoa, 1745), count of Savallà.
2. Josep Antoni de Rubí i de Boixadors (Barcelona, 1669 – Brussels, 1740), marquis of Rubí, royal councilor and lieutenant in the office of rational master of the Royal House and Court of the realms of the crown of Aragon.
3. Josep d'Amat i de Planella (Barcelona, 1670 –1715), noble of the Principality of Catalonia, marquis of Castellbell from 27 March 1702.
4. Francesc de Josa i d'Agulló (Barcelona, 1671 – Rome, 1721), noble of the Principality of Catalonia, archdeacon of Santa Maria del Mar and dignity and canon of the Cathedral of Barcelona church.
5. Llorens de Barutell i d'Erill (1670 – 1704), noble of the Principality of Catalonia.
6. Felip de Ferran i de Sacirera (Barcelona, 1658 – Naples, 1715), noble of the Principality of Catalonia.
7. Francesc de Junyent i de Vergós (Barcelona, 1662 – 1735), noble of the Principality of Catalonia.
8. Josep de Taverner i d'Ardena (Barcelona, 1670 – Girona, 1726), noble of the Principality of Catalonia, doctor of both laws and canon of the Cathedral of Barcelona church.
9. Agustí de Copons i de Copons (Vilafranca del Penedès, 1675 – 1737), noble of the Principality of Catalonia.
10. Alexandre de Palau i d'Aguilar (Conques, Pallars Jussà, 1671 – 1736?), noble of the Principality of Catalonia.
11. Josep de Rius i Falguera (Barcelona, 1675 – 1739), noble of the Principality of Catalonia, doctor of both laws and canon of the Cathedral of Barcelona church.
12. Antoni de Peguera i d'Aimeric (Barcelona, 1682 – Valencia, 1707), noble of the Principality of Catalonia.
13. Josep Clua i Granyena (17th - 18th centuries), doctor of theology.
14. Pau Ignasi de Dalmases i Ros (Barcelona, 1670 – 1718), noble of the Principality of Catalonia and doctor of arts and philosophy; archivist.

=== Academicians admitted to being chosen superintendents on 3 June 1700 ===
15. Joan de Pinós i de Rocabertí (Barcelona, 1670 - 18th century), noble of the Principality of Catalonia and knight of the Order of Saint John; superintendent.
16. Martín Díaz de Mayorga (León, c. 1646 - Barcelona, 18 th century), noble of the la crown of Castile (native of the kingdom of León) and captain of the Spanish infantry; superintendent.

=== Academicians admitted on 10 June 1700, in the First Academy ===
17. Joan Baptista de Vilana i de Millàs (Barcelona, 1666 - 1744), noble of the Principality of Catalonia; academicians introducer and treasurer.
18. Francesc Valls (Barcelona, 1665 - 1747), licentiated and chapel master of the Chatedral of Barcelona.
19. Diego Martínez y Folcrás (Sant Cugat del Vallès, 1660 - Seville, 18th century), noble and captain of infantry.

=== Academicians admitted on 18 June 1700 ===
20. Diego Pellicer y de Tovar (17th - 18th centuries), noble, knight of the order of Saint James, former auditor for the king in the province of Teramo of the kingdom of Naples, general auditor of the Royal Army of Catalonia, etc.
21. José Carrillo de Albornoz (Seville, 1671 - Madrid, 1747), noble of the crown of Castile (native of the kingdom of Seville) and captain of cuirassiers horses.
22. Felip Armengol de Folch (Valencia, 17th century - Barcelona, 11 September 1714), noble of the kingdom of Valencia and captain of infantry.
23. Josep de Llupià i d'Agulló (Barcelona, 17th century - La Seu d'Urgell, 1713), noble of the Principality of Catalonia, doctor of both laws and prelate canon of the Chatedral of Urgell church.

=== Academicians admitted on 21 July 1700, eve of the Fourth Academy ===
24. Antoni Serra (17th century - Barcelona, 1725), doctor of theology, former professor of philosophy at the General Study of Barcelona, professor of theology in the same, synodal examiner of several bishoprics and qualifier of the Holy Office of the Inquisition.
25. Diego de Cárdenas (Elx, 17th century - ?, 18th century), noble of the kingdom of Valencia and general comissar of the cavalry; superintendent.
26. Francesc Sans de Monrodon i Miquel (Barcelona, 1667 - Vienna?, 18th century), noble of the Principality of Catalunya; superintendent.

=== Academicians admitted on 5 August 1700, ¿in the Fifth Academy? ===
27. Josep Baltasar de Dalmases i Ros (Barcelona? 1667 - Barcelona, 1725), noble of the Principality of Catalonia, doctor of both laws, and head sacristan, dignity and canon of the Cathedral of Barcelona church; superintendent of the music.
28. Joan Galvany i Nonell (17th - 18th centuries), music.

=== Academician admitted on 30 August 1700, in the Ninth Academy ===
Note:

29. Iñigo de Villarroel (Toledo, 1666 - Barcelona, 1755), noble of the crown of Castile (native of the kingdom of Toledo) and captain of cuirassers horses.

=== Academician admitted on 21 October 1700, in the Tenth Academy ===
30. Manuel de Vega i Rovira (17th century - Barcelona, b. 1712), noble of the Principality of Catalonia, precentor, prior and vicar general in the Royal Monastery of Ripoll, definitor and general visitor of the congregation of Cloistered Benedictines in the province of Tarragona, etc.

=== Academicians admitted on 14 January 1701, eve of the Eleventh Academy ===
31. Alessandro Dini (Sinigaglia?, 17th century - ?, 18th century), noble of the peninsula of Italy.
32. Isidre Serradell (17th - 18th centuries), doctor of theology and professor of Humanity at the General Study of Barcelona.
33. Francisco Botelho de Morais e Vasconcelos (Torre de Moncorvo, 1670 - Salamanca, 1747), noble of the kingdom of Portugal.
34. Josep Aparici (Caldes de Montbui, 1653 - Barcelona, 1735), geographer.

=== Academicians admitted between 15 January 1701, date of the Eleventh Academy, and 18 November 1701, date of the Twelfth Academy ===
35. José de Solís y Gante (Salamanca, 1676 - Madrid?, 1765), noble of the crown of Castile (native of the kingdom of León).
36. Gabriel Álvarez de Toledo y Pellicer (Seville, 1662 - Madrid, 1714), noble of the crown of Castile (native of the kingdom of Seville).

=== Academicians admitted between 15 January 1701, date of the Eleventh Academy, and 25 March 1703, possible date of the Thirteenth Academy ===
37. Manuel de Pellicer y Velasco (17th - 18th centuries), noble of the crown of Castile.
38. Josep de Cortada i de Bru (Barcelona, 1683 - a. 1747), noble of the Principality of Catalonia.
39. Marc Antoni Vinyas (17th - 18th centuries), noble of the Principality of Catalonia and professor of Humanity at the General Study of Barcelona.
40. Benet de Sala (Girona, 1684 - 1749), noble of the Principality of Catalonia.
41. Marc d'Alva (17th - 18th centuries), noble, overseer of the presidios of Girona, etc.
42. Diego Pellicer y Bustamante (17th - 18th centuries), noble of the crown of Castile; former menino.
43. Josep Miró (17th - 18th centuries), doctor of theology.
44. Josep Faust de Patau i de Ferran (Barcelona, 17th century - Vienna, 1732), noble of the Principality of Catalonia.

=== Academician admitted between the publication of the Nueva disposición, y firmes leyes (between 27 March 1702 and 20 December 1703) and the one of the first edition of La Armonia del Parnàs (between 12 May and 31 December 1703) ===
45. Joaquim Vives i Ximenes (Barcelona, 1671 - ?, 18th century), honored citizen of Barcelona (de matrícula) and doctor of laws.

=== Academician admitted probably at the same time as the previous one ===
46. Miquel Francesc de Salvador (Barcelona, 1663 - ?, 18th century), honored citizen of Barcelona (de matrícula).

=== Reconstituter academicians (on 3 June 2025) ===
47. Miquel Pérez Latre (Barcelona, 1969), doctor of philosophy in History. Left on 19 February 2026.
48. Joan Pons Alzina (Ciutadella de Menorca, 1967), licentiated in History, speciality Modern History; superintendent. Left on 19 February 2026.
49. Eduard Puig Bordera (Bellpuig, 1982), squire of the Principality of Catalonia and doctor of philosophy in History; superintendent. Left on 19 February 2026.
50. Joaquim Verde i Llorente (Blanes, 1987), doctor of philosophy in History; archivist.

== Meninos and menines ==
The meninos are the apprentices of the Academy of the Distrustful. The list has been made from the "Razón de la obra" of the Nenias reales, and from the final list of the Nueva disposición, y firmes leyes.

=== Meninos admitted between the foundation of the Academy on 3 June 1700 and the publication of the Nenias reales (between 15 January and 31 December 1701) ===
Note:

1. Josep de Paguera i d'Aymerich (Barcelona, 1684 - ?, 18th century), noble of the Principality of Catalonia; he is not listed at the end of the Nueva disposición, y firmes leyes.
2. Antoni de Copons i de Copons (17th - 18th centuries), noble of the Principality of Catalonia.
3. Diego Pellicer y Bustamante (17th - 18th centuries), noble of the crown of Castile.
4. Josep Ferran i de Fivaller (Barcelona, 1688 - a. 1756), noble of the Principality of Catalonia.
5. Manuel Pellicer y Bustamante (17th - 18th centuries), noble of the crown of Castile.
6. Lluís de Paguera i d'Aymerich (Barcelona, 1686 - Gurp 1707), noble of the Principality of Catalonia.

=== Meninos admitted between the publication of the Nenias reales (between 15 January and 31 December 1701) and the one of the Nueva disposición, y firmes leyes (between 1702 and 20 December 1703) ===
7. Esteve de Pinós i d'Urries (Barcelona, 1687 - 1709), noble of the Principality of Catalonia.
8. Pere Patau i de Ferran (Barcelona, 17th - 18th centuries), noble of the Principality of Catalonia.

== Distrustful of honor ==
The distrustful of honor, figure created by Chapter IV of the new Statutes or Ordinances of the Academy of the Distrustful, are those natural and legal persons of recognized prestige and critical spirit that, in its opinion, deserve to be honorary members.

=== Distrustful of honor admitted in the reconstitutive session of 3 June 2025 ===
1. Montserrat Torrent i Serra (Barcelona, 1926), doctor honoris causa by the Autonomous University of Barcelona and organist master.

== Superintendents, archivists and others officers ==
It should be borne in mind: that the body of the Board of Officers has been created by Chapter VI of the new Statutes or Ordinances; that the name "First Board of Officers" (in quotation marks) has been granted to officers from 1700 to 1703 by Article 38.3.c) of the same; and that the superintendents and the archivist, then perpetual, were preceded by the temporary president, secretary and prosecutor (monthly according to the "Leyes y Ordenanzas” not conserved of 10 June 1700, and annual according to the Laws or Constitutions of 1702 or 1703), who then were from the academy and not just from each of their particular meetings.

From the same second board of officers: according to Article 27 of the new Ordinances, the mandate of its members lasts five years (the maximum allowed by the Civil Code of Catalonia for the directive boards of the associations), without prejudice to being re-elected; according to Article 33 the old superintendents and archivist (the people who have exercised these offices during the previous term) are members with voice but without vote as well as the president, the secretary and the prosecutor of the last particular academy; and according to Article 34.3 during the first half of the five-year term the older superintendent exercises as first superintendent while the younger one does so as second superintendent, exchanging themselves in the offices in the middle of the term.

=== "First Board of Officers" (1700-1703) ===
Superintendents (of academy)

1. The knight of Saint John and noble Joan de Pinós i de Rocabertí.
2. The noble Martín Díaz de Mayorga.
3. The noble Diego de Cárdenas.
4. The noble Francisco Sans de Monrodon i Miquel.

Superintendent of the music

The canon and noble Josep Baltasar de Dalmases i Ros.

Archivist

1. The noble Pau Ignasi de Dalmases i Ros.

Academicians introducer and treasurer

The noble Joan Baptista de Vilana i de Millàs.

=== Second Board of Officers (2025 - ) ===
Note:

Superintendents

5. The licentiated Joan Pons Alzina. (3 June 2025 - 19 February 2026)
6. The squire Eduard Puig Bordera. (3 June 2025 - 19 February 2026)

Archivist

2. The doctor Joaquim Verde i Llorente.

== Presidents, secretaries and prosecutors of the particular academies ==
The particular academies, as stated in articles 40 and 41 of the new Statutes or Ordinances, are each of the erudite meetings of the Academy of the Distrustful, numbered correlatively since 1700.

During the first stage of the Distrustful Academy (1700–1703), the president, the secretary and the prosecutor were not only of its particular erudite meetings but of the academy itself, preceding the perpetual superintendents and archivist. As has been said, they were temporary offices: monthly according to the "Leyes y Ordenanzas” not conserved of 10 June 1700, and annual according to the Laws or Constitutions of 1702 or 1703. According to these, if the Academy of the Distrustful had continued its activity during its first stage, these offices should have been renewed by a method of indirect cooptation through the presentation of a short list of three candidates by the outgoing officer to the academy, whose members should have chosen his successor by superiority of votes.

According to Article 40.3 of the new Statutes or Ordinances, the president, the secretary and the prosecutor are only of each of the ordinary particular academies (under the supervision of the two superintendents), while the extraordinary ones (dedicated to the reception of the speech of a distrustful of honor) are presided over by the two superintendents with the assistance of the archivist. According to Article 50, the mandate of the president, the secretary and the prosecutor is reduced to each ordinary particular academy renewing them through the system of sortition among the distrustful academicians who have presented themselves as candidates at the end of the previous one (according to the Second Transitional Provision, in a meeting of the General Assembly or General Council of the academy convened for this purpose for the election of the president, the secretary and the prosecutor of the Fourteenth Academy, the first of the new stage).

=== First Academy (10 June 1700) ===
President

The count of Savallà.

Secretary

The marquis of Rubí.

Prosecutor

The noble Josep Amat i de Planella.

=== Second Academy (23 June 1700) ===
President

The count of Savallà (incumbent, absent).
The noble Francesc de Josa i d'Agulló (acting).

Secretary

The marquis of Rubí.

Prosecutor

The noble Josep Amat i de Planella.

=== Third Academy (8 July 1700) ===
President

The count of Savallà (incumbent, absent).
The noble Francesc de Josa i d'Agulló (acting).

Secretary

The noble Felip Ferran i Sacirera.

Prosecutor

The noble Josep de Taverner i d'Ardena?

=== Fourth Academy (22 July 1700) ===
President

The prince of Darmstadt, lieutenant and captain general (honorary president).
The noble Francesc Josa i Agulló (effective).

Secretary

The noble Josep de Llupià i d'Agulló.

Prosecutor

The noble Diego Pellicer y de Tovar.

=== Ninth Academy (30 August 1700) ===
President

The noble Pau Ignasi de Dalmases i Ros.

Secretary

The doctor Antoni Serra.

Prosecutor

The noble Alexandre de Palau i d'Aguilar.

=== Tenth Academy (21 October 1700) ===
President

The noble Pau Ignasi de Dalmases i Ros.

Secretary

The doctor Antoni Serra.

Prosecutor

The noble Alexandre de Palau i d'Aguilar.

=== Eleventh Academy (15 January 1701) ===
Note:

President

The marquis of Rubí.

Secretary

The noble Josep Amat de Planella i Despalau.

Prosecutor

The noble Josep de Rius i de Falguera.

=== Twelfth Academy (18 November 1701) ===
Note:

President

The noble José Ignacio de Solís y Gante.

Secretary

The noble Gabriel Álvarez de Toledo y Pellicer.

Prosecutor

The noble Antoni de Copons i Copons.

=== Thirteenth Academy (25 March 1703?) ===
Note:

President

The count of Savallà.

Secretary

The noble Antoni de Peguera i d'Aimeric?

Prosecutor

The marquis of Rubí?

== In popular culture ==
In 2003 the Catalan music group Acadèmia dels Desconfiats was formed, with the edition of the demo Voltes 2003. After collaborating with different musics and a season in acoustic format, the band was again electrified when, from 2005, the drummer Dani Payà and the bassist David Sarda joined the Acadèmia with Guillem Rigol and projected the EP Monstruori consultos. The last work published by Acadèmia dels Desconfiats was El petit vailet on 8 December 2011.

In 2014 Gabino Serrano Martínez published the novel Intrigas en la academia de los desconfiados: El origen del 11 de septiembre de 1714, later translated into Catalan.

In 2023 the writer Àfrica Ragel i Moreno published the novel Els savis de l'Acadèmia dels Desconfiats.

== Bibliography ==
- Historical Archive of the City of Barcelona: "Obras varias en verso y prosa. De los académicos de la Academia Desconfiada de la ciudad de Barcelona. Recogidas de orden de la muy ilustre Academia por don Pablo Ignacio de Dalmases y Ros, su archivero y académico".
- Library of the University of Barcelona: Academia de los Desconfiados (1702–1703). Nueva disposición, y firmes leyes, que ha de observar en adelante, para su govierno, la Academia de los Desconfiados de la ciudad de Barcelona. Barcelona.
- Academia de los Desconfiados (1701). Amat i de Planella, Josep (ed.). Nenias reales y lágrimas obsequiosas que, a la immortal memoria del gran Carlos segundo, rey de las Españas y emperador de la América, en crédito de su más imponderable dolor y desempeño de su mayor fineza, dedica y consagra la Academia de los Desconfiados de Barcelona. Las saca en su nombre a la luz pública don Joseph Amat de Planella y Despalau, su secretario. Barcelona: Rafael Figueró.
- Campabadal i Bertran, Mireia (2006). La Reial Acadèmia de Bones Lletres en el segle XVIII. L'interès per la història, la llengua i la literatura catalanes PDF-1 (PDF). Montserrat: Reial Acadèmia de Bones Lletres / Publicacions de l'Abadia de Montserrat. pp. 27–58. ISBN 8484158772.
- Carreras y Bulbena, Joseph Rafael (1922). La Academia Desconfiada y sos acadèmichs (PDF). Barcelona: Tallers Gràfics "Atlas".
- Moliné y Brasés, Ernest (1917). "La Acadèmia dels Desconfiats". Boletín de la Real Academia de Buenas Letras. IX (65 (January to March)). Barcelona: Real Academia de Buenas Letras: 1–10.
- Muntada i Artiles, Marta (2002). "Els integrants de l'Acadèmia dels Desconfiats". Butlletí de la Reial Acadèmia de Bones Lletres de Barcelona. 48: 11–84.
- Rossich, Albert (1988). Francesc Vicent Garcia: Història i mite del Rector de Vallfogona. Barcelona: Edicions 62.
- Vega i Rovira, Manuel de; Vives i Ximenis, Joaquim, eds. (1703). La Armonia del Parnàs més numerosa en las poesias vàrias del atlant del cel poètic lo doctor Vicent Garcia, rector de la parroquial de Santa Maria de Vallfogona, recopiladas y emendadas per dos ingenis de la molt il·lustre Acadèmia dels Desconfiats erigida en la excel·lentíssima ciutat de Barcelona. Se dedica a la mateixa Acadèmia per medi dels rasgos de la ploma del Rector de Bellesguart. Barcelona: Rafael Figueró.
- "Estatuts o Ordinacions de l'Acadèmia dels Desconfiats" (PDF).
- "Llibre de l'Ànima de l'Acadèmia dels Desconfiats" (PDF).
- "Reconstitució de l'Acadèmia dels Desconfiats en el 325è aniversari de la seva fundació". Arxiu Històric de la Ciutat de Barcelona. Archived from the original on 17 November 2025.
- "Web 11setembre1714.org, L'Acadèmia dels Desconfiats (1700-1703)". Archived from the original on 3 March 2016.
