= Jilin Baoyuanfeng poultry plant fire =

2013 poultry plant fire in Dehui, Jilin Province, China

Jilin Baoyuanfeng Poultry Plant Fire
- Date: 3 June 2013
- Time: 6:06 am CST (UTC+08:00)
- Location: Mishazi (米沙子镇), Dehui, Jilin; 44.136°N 125.488°E
- Also known as: 宝源丰禽业有限公司" 6 － 3 "重大火灾爆炸事故
- Cause: electrical fire spreading to ammonia coolant.
- Deaths: 121
- Injuries: 76

On 3 June 2013, a fire at the Jilin Baoyuanfeng (吉林宝源丰) poultry processing plant in Mishazi (米沙子镇), a town about 35 km (22 mi) from Changchun, in Jilin province, People's Republic of China, killed at least 120 people. More than 60 others were hospitalised with injuries.

== Plant ==
Jilin Baoyuanfeng poultry plant fire (Jilin)

The poultry slaughterhouse was established by Jilin Baoyuanfeng Poultry Co. in 2009. It employed 1,200 people, but only 350 workers were believed to be on site at the time of the fire. Such plants typically have a coolant system that uses ammonia, a chemical believed to have caused the fire. The factory was divided into four workplaces, workplace 1, workplace 2, packaging and freezers. Throughout 2010, multiple smaller fires had occurred at the factory, without any serious action being taken to prevent further incidents.

In October 2010, the head of the local anticorruption body of the Communist Party, Zhao Wenbo, said the company's "progress into becoming a nationally known enterprise and the growth of its production inspiring". It was "top 100 agricultural processing companies", while the provincial capital of Changchun labeled it a "leading enterprise" in agricultural industrialization, a title that it also held in 2011.

== Fire ==
Around 6:10 am, workers noticed signs of fire and smoke in the female change rooms; around the same time, black smoke was noticed coming out of the upper level windows of the southern side of the main plant. At this time, some workers attempted to unsuccessfully put the fire out. Afterwards, the fire spread north and downwards, towards the freezer rooms.

At 6:30:57, the fire brigade of Dehui received reports of the fire and mobilised a provincial level response, ultimately involving over 800 firefighters, 300 police, 800 armed police and 150 medical personnel with 113 fire trucks and 54 ambulances.

The high temperatures caused an ammonia explosion in the pipes of the cooling unit for freezer room 1, destroying the roof and releasing ammonia into the surrounding environment. The leaking ammonia combusted and further fueled the fire, eventually spreading the fire to the whole factory.

Roughly 100 workers escaped, around 60 of whom sustained minor injuries from the blaze, while 25 trapped workers were rescued.

The fire was extinguished by 11 am. A suspected ammonia leak caused 3,000 residents living within a kilometre of the site to be evacuated. Some early reports attributed the cause of the fire to this leak, but others suggested an electrical fault was to blame. The fire is believed to be the worst nationwide since the 2000 Luoyang Christmas fire in Luoyang, Henan.

== Investigation ==
The investigation found that the initial fire broke out due to a short circuit in the overhead space somewhere between the female change rooms of workplace 1 and the adjoining workplace 2. Contributing factors to the rapid spread of the fire were polyurethane insulation and extensive use of expanded polystyrene boards, and the ceiling space being largely undivided between workplaces.

The large number of fatalities was due to the rapid spread of the fire with noxious gases, the convoluted and blocked escape paths, a lack of an internal fire alarm and that the workers were never trained on workplace safety, nor did they ever undertake evacuation drills. The safe work plans that were created were largely to satisfy the authorities.

Baoyuanfeng was found to place profits over worker safety; the factory design maximised profits for a minimal cost, resulting in deviations from the original building plan. Inflammable mineral wool was replaced by polyurethane, which contributed to the rapid spread of the fire and created heavy poisonous smoke when aflame. None of the employees, including the managers, were properly trained in fighting fires and lacked basic fire safety knowledge, illegally locking two emergency exits. Electrical equipment in the factory was largely not to standard, with wires throughout the building being routed haphazardly, cables being directly installed onto walls without cable trays.

Dehui city, in an attempt to grow their local GDP, overlooked safety issues and created multiple exceptions to regulations. In the aftermath of other industrial accidents in the same province, the local government only allocated for safety inspections, but did not enforce any safety regulations. The police and fire branches at Mishazi failed to adequately screen and classify the factory as a high risk facility (as a location with a concentrated workforce), issued a fire safety certificate without actually inspecting the premise, unclear definitions of fire safety at the local government level and lack of supervision from city level authourities.

== Reactions ==
CPC General Secretary, President Xi Jinping and Premier Li Keqiang "ordered every effort to go into the rescue operation" and stated that the "investigation into the cause of the accident would be vigorous".

== See also ==
- 2010 Shanghai fire
- Hamlet chicken processing plant fire
