= Clinton Jones (priest) =

American priest and gay rights activist

Canon Clinton Robert Jones Jr. (November 8, 1916 – June 3, 2006) was an Episcopal priest and gay rights activist based in Hartford, Connecticut.

== Early life and education ==
Jones was born in Brookfield, Connecticut, to Clinton Robert Jones and Henriette Elizabeth Jones, née Morehouse; he was the couple's only child to survive infancy. He was raised attending St. Paul's Episcopal Church in Brookfield, where his mother was an organist. His mother's family had been among the founders of the church in the 18th century. His father had been a Congregationalist, but was Episcopalian by the time Jones was born.

Jones first attended Brookfield's one-room schoolhouse, and went on to attend Danbury High School. His mother died in his junior year. Although he had initially planned to go to law school, as per his mother's aspirations for him to attend Yale, her death made Jones reconsider his future plans.

Jones went on to attend Bard College, drawn by its "very modern, very liberal" education program, graduating in 1938. While at Bard, he decided to pursue ministry, and after graduating he attended the General Theological Seminary, from which he graduated with a Master of Divinity degree in 1941, at age 24.

Jones later pursued a Master's in Sacred Theology from New York Theological Seminary. His thesis was titled "Counseling and the Male Homosexual".

== Career ==
Jones was ordained in the Episcopal Diocese of Connecticut on June 15, 1941. For the next few years, until 1945, he was a pastor at St. James Church in New London. In 1945, He served for a year as a chaplain in the U.S. Maritime Service at New London. Jones became the assistant minister of Hartford's Christ Church Cathedral in 1946. Jones was appointed canon (senior administrative priest) of Hartford's Christ Church Cathedral in 1948.

From 1946 until 1953, Jones served as the diocese's director of youth. At the same time, from 1947 until 1951, he also served as a member of the Episcopal National Youth Commission.

As canon, Jones had immense flexibility in what projects he pursued. His first work in the position was to revitalize local Episcopal summer camps. This would remain an interest of his, and he later became a summer camp administrator for camps across southern New England.

Jones retired in 1986. However, he remained active in local ministry. He joined the Greater Hartford Regional Ministry in 1990, later serving as the group's president. He continue to work with the group for years, only stopping shortly before his death.

== Activism ==
In the 1960s, Jones was appointed to the Rehabilitation Committee for the Greater Hartford Council of Churches. The committee addressed a variety of issues, including alcoholism, drug addiction, and the care of mental health patients, but Jones became particularly interested in researching homosexuality and the issues surrounding it. He ultimately decided that the issues would be best served by having a specific group dedicated to addressing homosexuality.

In 1963, Jones founded Project H alongside George Higgins, a professor from Trinity College, and attorney Donald Cantor. The group's name was chosen as a way to discreetly refer to homosexuality. The group focused on providing counseling services for gay Christians in the region. Meetings were held at the YMCA in Hartford, with social workers, psychologists, and clergy in attendance. Members of the group would go on to found the Kalos Society in 1968, considered the state's first LGBTQ political advocacy organization.

In 1965, Jones met with Alfred Gross, founder of the New York-based George H. Henry Foundation, a group similar to Project H. Jones subsequently opened a Hartford chapter of the foundation, with Gross's help.

In 1966, the Hartford Council of Churches agreed to pay for a private phone line in Jones' office, to protect the privacy of the individuals he was working with. Jones also ensured that his office was reachable by a private entrance, so visitors could enter and talk to him discreetly.

In 1966, Jones and his colleagues at Project H were told that the Connecticut Department of Corrections had established a separate block, "Block G", for inmates who were gay or transgender. The following year, Jones negotiated meetings with the warden, and after finding out that the Block G inmates were being treated more poorly than other inmates, attempted to convince the warden to dissolve the block. Although he was unsuccessful, Jones was able to provide counseling to individual inmates in Block G. He would continue providing counseling to gay and transgender inmates until his retirement in 1986.

In the late 1960s, Jones founded the Married Gay Men's Group of Hartford.

In 1971, Jones and Project H colleague George Higgins founded the Twenty-One Club, which primarily served transgender individuals, providing them with counseling and psychiatric services. The group continued to meet at the church for 30 years.

Later in the 1970s, Jones founded the Gender Identity Clinic of New England, which connected transgender people to social and healthcare workers who helped patients access affirming mental health treatments, hormone therapy, and gender-affirming surgery.

In late 1973, Jones gave a seminar on "transsexualism" to Hartford's Police Community Relations Department.

In 1976, Jones was a witness representing Integrity for the Joint Commission on the Church and Human Affairs, an Episcopal commission which was "study[ing] the gay issue".

In 1986, with Jones' retirement, Project H (which had been renamed the Committee on Sexual Minorities in 1980) disbanded, as the presence of other LGBTQ organizations in the area meant the services provided by Project H had become increasingly less vital.

== Publications ==
=== Books ===
- What About Homosexuality (1972)
- Homosexuality and Counseling (1974)
- Understanding Gay Relatives and Friends (1978)

== Personal life and death ==
Jones was known for his manners and his formality. One story goes that when he was temporarily housing a transexual teenager who had been kicked out of her home, the teenager found herself "completely at sea when confronted with the formalized gentility of Jones’s home" and his "formal dinner[s]".

Jones was gay, and was in a domestic partnership with church musician Kenneth Woods for 40 years; however, he was not open about his sexuality during his lifetime. After Jones retired in 1986, the two moved to Manchester, Connecticut.

Jones died of pancreatic cancer in 2006. After his death, Woods inherited his property.

== Legacy ==
In 2005, The Friends of Christ Church Cathedral created the Canon Clinton R. Jones Award in honor of Jones' decades of ministry. The award was to be given annually to "a person of faith who works quietly in the community on issues at the cutting edge of change".

Jones' personal papers, which include his correspondence, are held at the GLBTQ Archives at Central Connecticut State’s Elihu Burritt Library.
